= Elections in North Carolina =

This is a list of elections in the U.S. state of North Carolina.

In a 2020 study, North Carolina was ranked as the 23rd easiest state for citizens to vote in. In the 2024 update, the state ranked 30th.

== US Congress ==
=== House of Representatives elections ===
- 1996
- 1998
- 2000
- 2002
- 2004
  - sp:1
- 2006
- 2008
- 2010
- 2012
- 2014
  - sp:12
- 2016
- 2018
  - 9
- 2019
  - sp:3
  - sp:9
- 2020
- 2022
- 2024
- 2026

=== Senate elections ===
- 1936
- 1938
- 1942
- 1944
- 1948
- 1948 (sp)
- 1950
- 1950 (sp)
- 1954
- 1954 (sp)
- 1956
- 1958 (sp)
- 1960
- 1966
- 1968
- 1972
- 1974
- 1978
- 1980
- 1984
- 1986
- 1986 (sp)
- 1990
- 1992
- 1996
- 1998
- 2002
- 2004
- 2008
- 2010
- 2014
- 2016
- 2020
- 2022
- 2026
- 2028

== State executive ==
=== Gubernatorial elections ===
- 1960
- 1964
- 1968
- 1972
- 1976
- 1980
- 1984
- 1988
- 1992
- 1996
- 2000
- 2004
- 2008
- 2012
- 2016
- 2020
- 2024

=== Lieutenant Governor elections ===
- 1960
- 1964
- 1968
- 1972
- 1976
- 1980
- 1984
- 1988
- 1992
- 1996
- 2000
- 2004
- 2008
- 2012
- 2016
- 2020
- 2024

=== Council of State elections ===
- 1996
- 2000
- 2004
- 2008
- 2012
- 2016
- 2020
- 2024

== State legislature ==
=== State Senate elections ===
- 1998
- 2000
- 2002
- 2004
- 2006
- 2008
- 2010
- 2012
- 2014
- 2016
- 2018
- 2020
- 2022
- 2024
- 2026

=== State House elections ===
- 1998
- 2000
- 2002
- 2004
- 2006
- 2008
- 2010
- 2012
- 2014
- 2016
- 2018
- 2020
- 2022
- 2024
- 2026

== State judiciary ==
- 1996
- 1998
- 2000
- 2002
- 2004
- 2006
- 2008
- 2010
- 2012
- 2014
- 2016
- 2018
- 2020
- 2022
- 2024
- 2026

== Ballot Measures ==
- North Carolina Amendment 1

== See also ==
- 2026 North Carolina elections
- Electoral reform in North Carolina
- North Carolina State Board of Elections and Ethics Enforcement
- Elected officials:
  - List of United States senators from North Carolina
  - List of United States representatives from North Carolina
- Politics of North Carolina
  - Political party strength in North Carolina
