= List of United States senators from North Carolina =

Current delegation

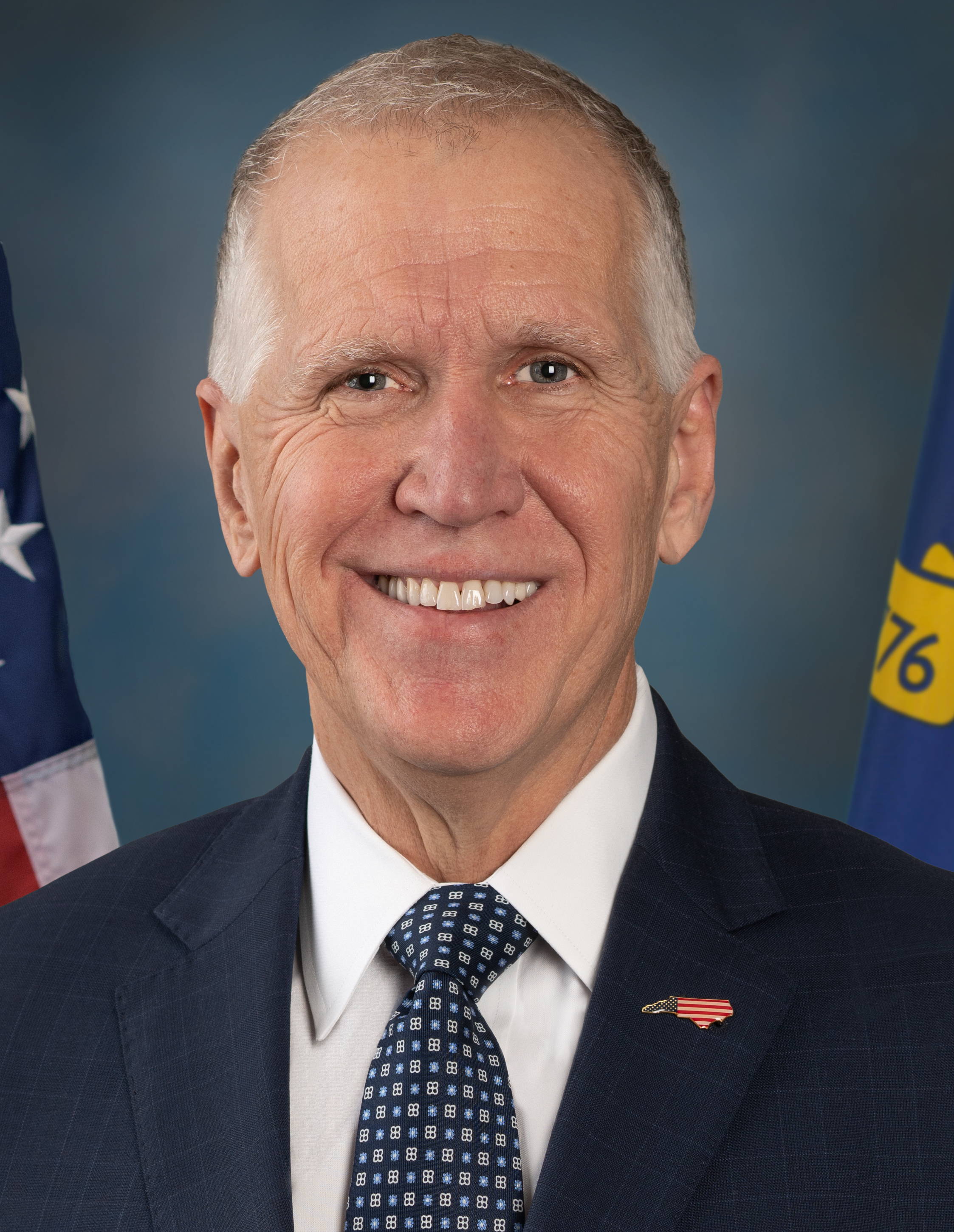
Thom Tillis (R)

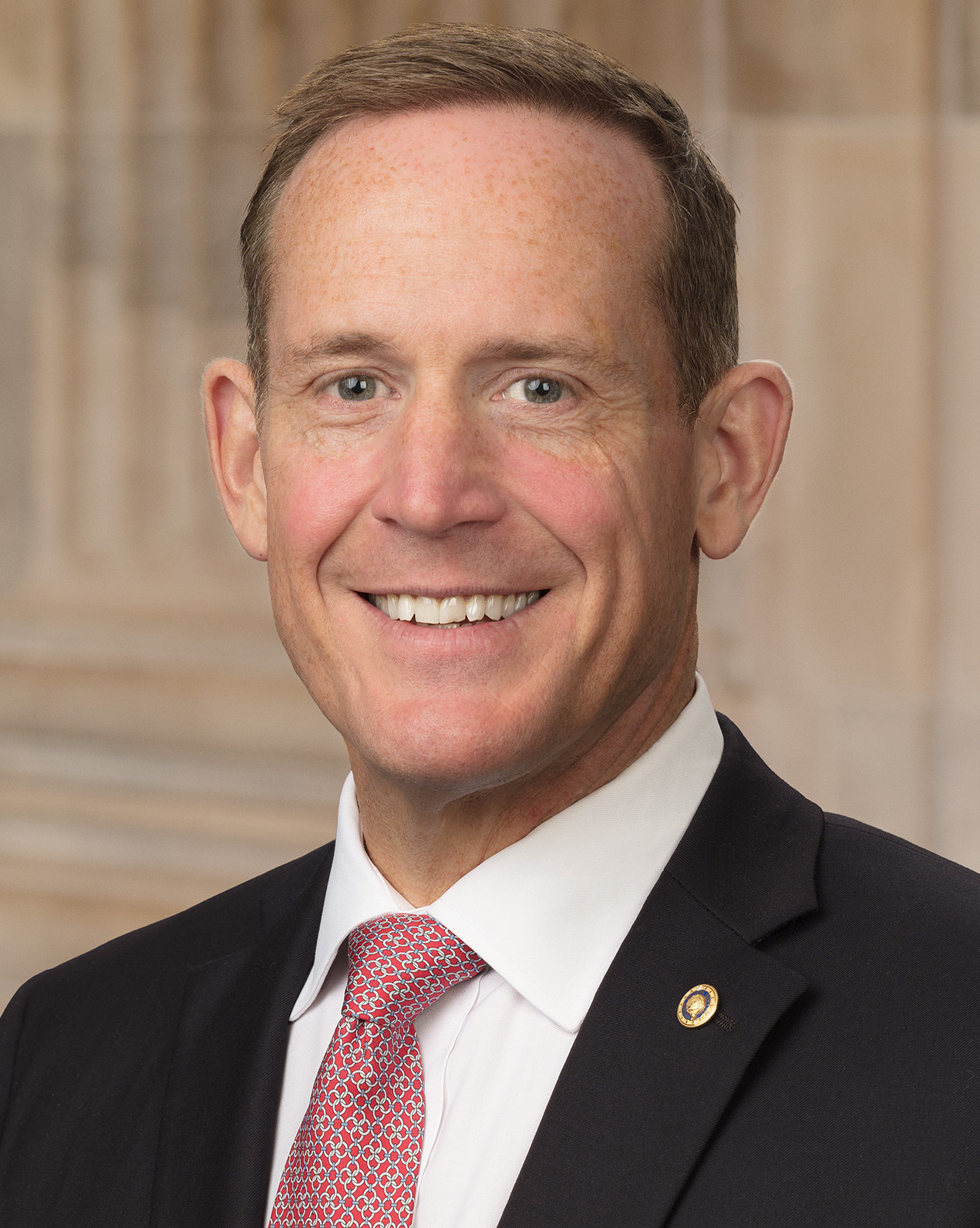
Ted Budd (R)

(ordered by seniority)

North Carolina ratified the Constitution on November 21, 1789, after the beginning of the 1st Congress. Its current senators are Republicans Thom Tillis and Ted Budd. Jesse Helms was North Carolina's longest-serving senator (1973–2003).

== List of senators ==
Class 2 Class 2 senators belong to the electoral cycle that most recently had regular elections in 2008, 2014, 2020, and 2026. The next election will be in 2032.						C	Class 3 Class 3 senators belong to the electoral cycle that most recently had regular elections in 2004, 2010, 2016, and 2022. The next election will be in 2028.					
#	Senator	Party	Dates in office	Electoral history	T	C	T	Electoral history	Dates in office	Party	Senator	#
Vacant			Nov 21, 1789 – Nov 27, 1789	North Carolina ratified the Constitution Nov 21, 1789 but didn't elect its senators until Nov 27, 1789.	1	1st	1	North Carolina ratified the Constitution Nov 21, 1789 but didn't elect its senators until Nov 27, 1789.	Nov 21, 1789 – Nov 27, 1789	Vacant		
1	Samuel Johnston (Edenton)	Pro- Admin.	Nov 27, 1789 – Mar 3, 1793	Elected in 1789. Lost re-election.	1	1st	1	Elected in 1789. [data missing]	Nov 27, 1789 – Mar 3, 1795	Pro- Admin.	Benjamin Hawkins (Warren County)	1
1	Samuel Johnston (Edenton)	Pro- Admin.	Nov 27, 1789 – Mar 3, 1793	Elected in 1789. Lost re-election.	1	2nd	1	Elected in 1789. [data missing]	Nov 27, 1789 – Mar 3, 1795	Pro- Admin.	Benjamin Hawkins (Warren County)	1
2	Alexander Martin (Guilford County)	Anti- Admin.	Mar 4, 1793 – Mar 3, 1799	Elected in 1792. Lost re-election.	2	3rd	1	Elected in 1789. [data missing]	Nov 27, 1789 – Mar 3, 1795	Anti- Admin.	Benjamin Hawkins (Warren County)	1
2	Alexander Martin (Guilford County)	Democratic- Republican	Mar 4, 1793 – Mar 3, 1799	Elected in 1792. Lost re-election.	2	4th	2	Elected in 1795. Retired.	Mar 4, 1795 – Mar 3, 1801	Democratic- Republican	Timothy Bloodworth (Wilmington)	2
2	Alexander Martin (Guilford County)	Democratic- Republican	Mar 4, 1793 – Mar 3, 1799	Elected in 1792. Lost re-election.	2	5th	2	Elected in 1795. Retired.	Mar 4, 1795 – Mar 3, 1801	Democratic- Republican	Timothy Bloodworth (Wilmington)	2
3	Jesse Franklin (Surry County)	Democratic- Republican	Mar 4, 1799 – Mar 3, 1805	Elected in 1799. Lost re-election.	3	6th	2	Elected in 1795. Retired.	Mar 4, 1795 – Mar 3, 1801	Democratic- Republican	Timothy Bloodworth (Wilmington)	2
3	Jesse Franklin (Surry County)	Democratic- Republican	Mar 4, 1799 – Mar 3, 1805	Elected in 1799. Lost re-election.	3	7th	3	Elected in 1800. Resigned to return to the State Superior Court.	Mar 4, 1801 – Feb 17, 1807	Democratic- Republican	David Stone (Bertie County)	3
3	Jesse Franklin (Surry County)	Democratic- Republican	Mar 4, 1799 – Mar 3, 1805	Elected in 1799. Lost re-election.	3	8th	3	Elected in 1800. Resigned to return to the State Superior Court.	Mar 4, 1801 – Feb 17, 1807	Democratic- Republican	David Stone (Bertie County)	3
Vacant			Mar 4, 1805 – Dec 22, 1805	Montfort Stokes was elected in 1804 but refused the position.	4	9th	3	Elected in 1800. Resigned to return to the State Superior Court.	Mar 4, 1801 – Feb 17, 1807	Democratic- Republican	David Stone (Bertie County)	3
4	James Turner (Warrenton)	Democratic- Republican	Dec 22, 1805 – Nov 21, 1816	Elected to finish the vacant term.	4	9th	3	Elected in 1800. Resigned to return to the State Superior Court.	Mar 4, 1801 – Feb 17, 1807	Democratic- Republican	David Stone (Bertie County)	3
4	James Turner (Warrenton)	Democratic- Republican	Dec 22, 1805 – Nov 21, 1816	Elected to finish the vacant term.	4	9th	3		Feb 17, 1807 – Mar 3, 1807	Vacant		
4	James Turner (Warrenton)	Democratic- Republican	Dec 22, 1805 – Nov 21, 1816	Elected to finish the vacant term.	4	10th	4	Elected in 1806. Retired.	Mar 4, 1807 – Mar 3, 1813	Democratic- Republican	Jesse Franklin (Surry County)	4
4	James Turner (Warrenton)	Democratic- Republican	Dec 22, 1805 – Nov 21, 1816	Elected to finish the vacant term.	4	11th	4	Elected in 1806. Retired.	Mar 4, 1807 – Mar 3, 1813	Democratic- Republican	Jesse Franklin (Surry County)	4
4	James Turner (Warrenton)	Democratic- Republican	Dec 22, 1805 – Nov 21, 1816	Re-elected in 1810. Resigned due to ill health.	5	12th	4	Elected in 1806. Retired.	Mar 4, 1807 – Mar 3, 1813	Democratic- Republican	Jesse Franklin (Surry County)	4
4	James Turner (Warrenton)	Democratic- Republican	Dec 22, 1805 – Nov 21, 1816	Re-elected in 1810. Resigned due to ill health.	5	13th	5	Elected in 1812. Resigned.	Mar 4, 1813 – Dec 24, 1814	Democratic- Republican	David Stone (Raleigh)	5
4	James Turner (Warrenton)	Democratic- Republican	Dec 22, 1805 – Nov 21, 1816	Re-elected in 1810. Resigned due to ill health.	5	13th	5		Dec 24, 1814 – Dec 1814	Vacant		
4	James Turner (Warrenton)	Democratic- Republican	Dec 22, 1805 – Nov 21, 1816	Re-elected in 1810. Resigned due to ill health.	5	13th	5	Elected to finish Stone's term. Resigned without having qualified.	Dec 1814 – Dec 5, 1815	Democratic- Republican	Francis Locke Jr. (Salisbury)	6
4	James Turner (Warrenton)	Democratic- Republican	Dec 22, 1805 – Nov 21, 1816	Re-elected in 1810. Resigned due to ill health.	5	14th	5	Elected to finish Stone's term. Resigned without having qualified.	Dec 1814 – Dec 5, 1815	Democratic- Republican	Francis Locke Jr. (Salisbury)	6
4	James Turner (Warrenton)	Democratic- Republican	Dec 22, 1805 – Nov 21, 1816	Re-elected in 1810. Resigned due to ill health.	5	14th	5		Dec 5, 1815 – Dec 13, 1815	Vacant		
4	James Turner (Warrenton)	Democratic- Republican	Dec 22, 1805 – Nov 21, 1816	Re-elected in 1810. Resigned due to ill health.	5	14th	5	Elected to finish Stone's term.	Dec 13, 1815 – Nov 14, 1828	Democratic- Republican	Nathaniel Macon (Warrenton)	7
Vacant			Nov 21, 1816 – Dec 4, 1816		5	14th	5	Elected to finish Stone's term.	Dec 13, 1815 – Nov 14, 1828	Democratic- Republican	Nathaniel Macon (Warrenton)	7
5	Montfort Stokes (Wilkesboro)	Democratic- Republican	Dec 4, 1816 – Mar 3, 1823	Elected to finish Turner's term.	5	14th	5	Elected to finish Stone's term.	Dec 13, 1815 – Nov 14, 1828	Democratic- Republican	Nathaniel Macon (Warrenton)	7
5	Montfort Stokes (Wilkesboro)	Democratic- Republican	Dec 4, 1816 – Mar 3, 1823	Elected in 1816. Lost re-election.	6	15th	5	Elected to finish Stone's term.	Dec 13, 1815 – Nov 14, 1828	Democratic- Republican	Nathaniel Macon (Warrenton)	7
5	Montfort Stokes (Wilkesboro)	Democratic- Republican	Dec 4, 1816 – Mar 3, 1823	Elected in 1816. Lost re-election.	6	16th	6	Re-elected in 1818.	Dec 13, 1815 – Nov 14, 1828	Democratic- Republican	Nathaniel Macon (Warrenton)	7
5	Montfort Stokes (Wilkesboro)	Democratic- Republican	Dec 4, 1816 – Mar 3, 1823	Elected in 1816. Lost re-election.	6	17th	6	Re-elected in 1818.	Dec 13, 1815 – Nov 14, 1828	Democratic- Republican	Nathaniel Macon (Warrenton)	7
6	John Branch (Enfield)	Democratic-Republican	Mar 4, 1823 – Mar 9, 1829	Elected in 1822.	7	18th	6	Re-elected in 1818.	Dec 13, 1815 – Nov 14, 1828	Democratic- Republican	Nathaniel Macon (Warrenton)	7
6	John Branch (Enfield)	Jacksonian	Mar 4, 1823 – Mar 9, 1829	Elected in 1822.	7	19th	7	Re-elected in 1825. Resigned.	Dec 13, 1815 – Nov 14, 1828	Jacksonian	Nathaniel Macon (Warrenton)	7
6	John Branch (Enfield)	Jacksonian	Mar 4, 1823 – Mar 9, 1829	Elected in 1822.	7	20th	7	Re-elected in 1825. Resigned.	Dec 13, 1815 – Nov 14, 1828	Jacksonian	Nathaniel Macon (Warrenton)	7
6	John Branch (Enfield)	Jacksonian	Mar 4, 1823 – Mar 9, 1829	Elected in 1822.	7	20th	7		Nov 14, 1828 – Dec 15, 1828	Vacant		
6	John Branch (Enfield)	Jacksonian	Mar 4, 1823 – Mar 9, 1829	Elected in 1822.	7	20th	7	Elected to finish Macon's term. Retired.	Dec 15, 1828 – Mar 3, 1831	Jacksonian	James Iredell Jr. (Edenton)	8
6	John Branch (Enfield)	Jacksonian	Mar 4, 1823 – Mar 9, 1829	Re-elected in 1828. Resigned to become U.S. Secretary of the Navy.	8	21st	7	Elected to finish Macon's term. Retired.	Dec 15, 1828 – Mar 3, 1831	Jacksonian	James Iredell Jr. (Edenton)	8
Vacant			Mar 9, 1829 – Dec 9, 1829		8	21st	7	Elected to finish Macon's term. Retired.	Dec 15, 1828 – Mar 3, 1831	Jacksonian	James Iredell Jr. (Edenton)	8
7	Bedford Brown (Caswell County)	Jacksonian	Dec 9, 1829 – Nov 16, 1840	Elected to finish Branch's term.	8	21st	7	Elected to finish Macon's term. Retired.	Dec 15, 1828 – Mar 3, 1831	Jacksonian	James Iredell Jr. (Edenton)	8
7	Bedford Brown (Caswell County)	Jacksonian	Dec 9, 1829 – Nov 16, 1840	Elected to finish Branch's term.	8	22nd	8	Elected in 1830. Resigned.	Mar 4, 1831 – Nov 26, 1836	Jacksonian	Willie P. Mangum (Red Mountain)	9
7	Bedford Brown (Caswell County)	Jacksonian	Dec 9, 1829 – Nov 16, 1840	Elected to finish Branch's term.	8	23rd	8	Elected in 1830. Resigned.	Mar 4, 1831 – Nov 26, 1836	National; Republican	Willie P. Mangum (Red Mountain)	9
7	Bedford Brown (Caswell County)	Jacksonian	Dec 9, 1829 – Nov 16, 1840	Re-elected in 1835. Resigned.	9	24th	8	Elected in 1830. Resigned.	Mar 4, 1831 – Nov 26, 1836	National; Republican	Willie P. Mangum (Red Mountain)	9
7	Bedford Brown (Caswell County)	Jacksonian	Dec 9, 1829 – Nov 16, 1840	Re-elected in 1835. Resigned.	9	24th	8		Nov 26, 1836 – Dec 5, 1836	Vacant		
7	Bedford Brown (Caswell County)	Jacksonian	Dec 9, 1829 – Nov 16, 1840	Re-elected in 1835. Resigned.	9	24th	8	Elected to finish Mangum's term.	Dec 5, 1836 – Nov 16, 1840	Jacksonian	Robert Strange (Fayetteville)	10
7	Bedford Brown (Caswell County)	Democratic	Dec 9, 1829 – Nov 16, 1840	Re-elected in 1835. Resigned.	9	25th	9	Elected to full term in 1836. Resigned.	Dec 5, 1836 – Nov 16, 1840	Democratic	Robert Strange (Fayetteville)	10
7	Bedford Brown (Caswell County)	Democratic	Dec 9, 1829 – Nov 16, 1840	Re-elected in 1835. Resigned.	9	26th	9	Elected to full term in 1836. Resigned.	Dec 5, 1836 – Nov 16, 1840	Democratic	Robert Strange (Fayetteville)	10
Vacant			Nov 16, 1840 – Nov 25, 1840		9	26th	9		Nov 16, 1840 – Nov 25, 1840	Vacant		
8	Willie P. Mangum (Red Mountain)	Whig	Nov 25, 1840 – Mar 3, 1853	Elected to finish Brown's term.	9	26th	9	Elected to finish Strange's term. [data missing]	Nov 25, 1840 – Mar 3, 1843	Whig	William Graham (Hillsborough)	11
8	Willie P. Mangum (Red Mountain)	Whig	Nov 25, 1840 – Mar 3, 1853	Elected in 1841.	10	27th	9	Elected to finish Strange's term. [data missing]	Nov 25, 1840 – Mar 3, 1843	Whig	William Graham (Hillsborough)	11
8	Willie P. Mangum (Red Mountain)	Whig	Nov 25, 1840 – Mar 3, 1853	Elected in 1841.	10	28th	10	Elected in 1843. Resigned.	Mar 4, 1843 – Jul 25, 1846	Democratic	William Henry Haywood Jr. (Raleigh)	12
8	Willie P. Mangum (Red Mountain)	Whig	Nov 25, 1840 – Mar 3, 1853	Elected in 1841.	10	29th	10	Elected in 1843. Resigned.	Mar 4, 1843 – Jul 25, 1846	Democratic	William Henry Haywood Jr. (Raleigh)	12
8	Willie P. Mangum (Red Mountain)	Whig	Nov 25, 1840 – Mar 3, 1853	Elected in 1841.	10	29th	10		Jul 25, 1846 – Nov 25, 1846	Vacant		
8	Willie P. Mangum (Red Mountain)	Whig	Nov 25, 1840 – Mar 3, 1853	Elected in 1841.	10	29th	10	Elected to finish Haywood's term.	Nov 25, 1846 – Mar 3, 1855	Whig	George Badger (Raleigh)	13
8	Willie P. Mangum (Red Mountain)	Whig	Nov 25, 1840 – Mar 3, 1853	Re-elected in 1847. Lost re-election.	11	30th	10	Elected to finish Haywood's term.	Nov 25, 1846 – Mar 3, 1855	Whig	George Badger (Raleigh)	13
8	Willie P. Mangum (Red Mountain)	Whig	Nov 25, 1840 – Mar 3, 1853	Re-elected in 1847. Lost re-election.	11	31st	11	Re-elected in 1849. Retired.	Nov 25, 1846 – Mar 3, 1855	Whig	George Badger (Raleigh)	13
8	Willie P. Mangum (Red Mountain)	Whig	Nov 25, 1840 – Mar 3, 1853	Re-elected in 1847. Lost re-election.	11	32nd	11	Re-elected in 1849. Retired.	Nov 25, 1846 – Mar 3, 1855	Whig	George Badger (Raleigh)	13
Vacant			Mar 4, 1853 – Dec 6, 1854	Legislature failed to elect	12	33rd	11	Re-elected in 1849. Retired.	Nov 25, 1846 – Mar 3, 1855	Whig	George Badger (Raleigh)	13
9	David S. Reid (Reidsville)	Democratic	Dec 6, 1854 – Mar 3, 1859	Elected to finish vacant term. Lost re-election.	12	33rd	11	Re-elected in 1849. Retired.	Nov 25, 1846 – Mar 3, 1855	Whig	George Badger (Raleigh)	13
9	David S. Reid (Reidsville)	Democratic	Dec 6, 1854 – Mar 3, 1859	Elected to finish vacant term. Lost re-election.	12	34th	12	Elected in 1855. Resigned to become U.S. District Court Judge.	Mar 4, 1855 – May 5, 1858	Democratic	Asa Biggs (Williamston)	14
9	David S. Reid (Reidsville)	Democratic	Dec 6, 1854 – Mar 3, 1859	Elected to finish vacant term. Lost re-election.	12	35th	12	Elected in 1855. Resigned to become U.S. District Court Judge.	Mar 4, 1855 – May 5, 1858	Democratic	Asa Biggs (Williamston)	14
9	David S. Reid (Reidsville)	Democratic	Dec 6, 1854 – Mar 3, 1859	Elected to finish vacant term. Lost re-election.	12	35th	12		May 5, 1858 – May 7, 1858	Vacant		
9	David S. Reid (Reidsville)	Democratic	Dec 6, 1854 – Mar 3, 1859	Elected to finish vacant term. Lost re-election.	12	35th	12	Appointed to continue Biggs's term.	May 7, 1858 – Mar 11, 1861	Democratic	Thomas L. Clingman (Asheville)	15
9	David S. Reid (Reidsville)	Democratic	Dec 6, 1854 – Mar 3, 1859	Elected to finish vacant term. Lost re-election.	12	35th	12	Elected Nov 23, 1858 to finish Biggs's term.	May 7, 1858 – Mar 11, 1861	Democratic	Thomas L. Clingman (Asheville)	15
10	Thomas Bragg (Raleigh)	Democratic	Mar 4, 1859 – Mar 8, 1861	Elected in 1858 or 1859. Resigned and subsequently expelled for support of the Confederacy.	13	36th	12	Elected Nov 23, 1858 to finish Biggs's term.	May 7, 1858 – Mar 11, 1861	Democratic	Thomas L. Clingman (Asheville)	15
10	Thomas Bragg (Raleigh)	Democratic	Mar 4, 1859 – Mar 8, 1861	Elected in 1858 or 1859. Resigned and subsequently expelled for support of the Confederacy.	13	37th	13	Re-elected in 1861. Resigned and subsequently expelled for support of the Confederacy.	May 7, 1858 – Mar 11, 1861	Democratic	Thomas L. Clingman (Asheville)	15
10	Thomas Bragg (Raleigh)	Democratic	Mar 4, 1859 – Mar 8, 1861	Elected in 1858 or 1859. Resigned and subsequently expelled for support of the Confederacy.	13	37th	13	Civil War and Reconstruction	Mar 11, 1861 – Jul 14, 1868	Vacant		
Vacant			Jul 11, 1861 – Jul 14, 1868	Civil War and Reconstruction	13	37th	13	Civil War and Reconstruction	Mar 11, 1861 – Jul 14, 1868	Vacant		
Vacant			Jul 11, 1861 – Jul 14, 1868	Civil War and Reconstruction	13	38th	13	Civil War and Reconstruction	Mar 11, 1861 – Jul 14, 1868	Vacant		
Vacant			Jul 11, 1861 – Jul 14, 1868	Civil War and Reconstruction	14	39th	13	Civil War and Reconstruction	Mar 11, 1861 – Jul 14, 1868	Vacant		
Vacant			Jul 11, 1861 – Jul 14, 1868	Civil War and Reconstruction	14	40th	14	Civil War and Reconstruction	Mar 11, 1861 – Jul 14, 1868	Vacant		
11	Joseph C. Abbott (Wilmington)	Republican	Jul 14, 1868 – Mar 3, 1871	Elected in 1868 to finish vacant term. Lost renomination.	14	40th	14	Elected in 1868 to finish vacant term. Retired.	Jul 14, 1868 – Mar 3, 1873	Republican	John Pool (Elizabeth City)	16
11	Joseph C. Abbott (Wilmington)	Republican	Jul 14, 1868 – Mar 3, 1871	Elected in 1868 to finish vacant term. Lost renomination.	14	41st	14	Elected in 1868 to finish vacant term. Retired.	Jul 14, 1868 – Mar 3, 1873	Republican	John Pool (Elizabeth City)	16
Vacant			Mar 4, 1871 – Jan 30, 1872	Legislature failed to elect	15	42nd	14	Elected in 1868 to finish vacant term. Retired.	Jul 14, 1868 – Mar 3, 1873	Republican	John Pool (Elizabeth City)	16
12	Matt W. Ransom (Weldon)	Democratic	Jan 30, 1872 – Mar 3, 1895	Elected to finish vacant term.	15	42nd	14	Elected in 1868 to finish vacant term. Retired.	Jul 14, 1868 – Mar 3, 1873	Republican	John Pool (Elizabeth City)	16
12	Matt W. Ransom (Weldon)	Democratic	Jan 30, 1872 – Mar 3, 1895	Elected to finish vacant term.	15	43rd	15	Elected in 1872. Lost re-election.	Mar 4, 1873 – Mar 3, 1879	Democratic	Augustus S. Merrimon (Raleigh)	17
12	Matt W. Ransom (Weldon)	Democratic	Jan 30, 1872 – Mar 3, 1895	Elected to finish vacant term.	15	44th	15	Elected in 1872. Lost re-election.	Mar 4, 1873 – Mar 3, 1879	Democratic	Augustus S. Merrimon (Raleigh)	17
12	Matt W. Ransom (Weldon)	Democratic	Jan 30, 1872 – Mar 3, 1895	Re-elected in 1876.	16	45th	15	Elected in 1872. Lost re-election.	Mar 4, 1873 – Mar 3, 1879	Democratic	Augustus S. Merrimon (Raleigh)	17
12	Matt W. Ransom (Weldon)	Democratic	Jan 30, 1872 – Mar 3, 1895	Re-elected in 1876.	16	46th	16	Elected in 1879.	Mar 4, 1879 – Apr 14, 1894	Democratic	Zebulon Vance (Charlotte)	18
12	Matt W. Ransom (Weldon)	Democratic	Jan 30, 1872 – Mar 3, 1895	Re-elected in 1876.	16	47th	16	Elected in 1879.	Mar 4, 1879 – Apr 14, 1894	Democratic	Zebulon Vance (Charlotte)	18
12	Matt W. Ransom (Weldon)	Democratic	Jan 30, 1872 – Mar 3, 1895	Re-elected in 1883.	17	48th	16	Elected in 1879.	Mar 4, 1879 – Apr 14, 1894	Democratic	Zebulon Vance (Charlotte)	18
12	Matt W. Ransom (Weldon)	Democratic	Jan 30, 1872 – Mar 3, 1895	Re-elected in 1883.	17	49th	17	Re-elected in 1884.	Mar 4, 1879 – Apr 14, 1894	Democratic	Zebulon Vance (Charlotte)	18
12	Matt W. Ransom (Weldon)	Democratic	Jan 30, 1872 – Mar 3, 1895	Re-elected in 1883.	17	50th	17	Re-elected in 1884.	Mar 4, 1879 – Apr 14, 1894	Democratic	Zebulon Vance (Charlotte)	18
12	Matt W. Ransom (Weldon)	Democratic	Jan 30, 1872 – Mar 3, 1895	Re-elected in 1889. Lost re-election.	18	51st	17	Re-elected in 1884.	Mar 4, 1879 – Apr 14, 1894	Democratic	Zebulon Vance (Charlotte)	18
12	Matt W. Ransom (Weldon)	Democratic	Jan 30, 1872 – Mar 3, 1895	Re-elected in 1889. Lost re-election.	18	52nd	18	Re-elected in 1890. Died.	Mar 4, 1879 – Apr 14, 1894	Democratic	Zebulon Vance (Charlotte)	18
12	Matt W. Ransom (Weldon)	Democratic	Jan 30, 1872 – Mar 3, 1895	Re-elected in 1889. Lost re-election.	18	53rd	18	Re-elected in 1890. Died.	Mar 4, 1879 – Apr 14, 1894	Democratic	Zebulon Vance (Charlotte)	18
12	Matt W. Ransom (Weldon)	Democratic	Jan 30, 1872 – Mar 3, 1895	Re-elected in 1889. Lost re-election.	18	53rd	18		Apr 14, 1894 – Apr 19, 1894	Vacant		
12	Matt W. Ransom (Weldon)	Democratic	Jan 30, 1872 – Mar 3, 1895	Re-elected in 1889. Lost re-election.	18	53rd	18	Appointed to continue Vance's term. Successor qualified.	Apr 19, 1894 – Jan 23, 1895	Democratic	Thomas J. Jarvis (Greenville)	19
12	Matt W. Ransom (Weldon)	Democratic	Jan 30, 1872 – Mar 3, 1895	Re-elected in 1889. Lost re-election.	18	53rd	18	Elected in 1894 to finish Vance's term.	Jan 23, 1895 – Mar 3, 1903	Republican	Jeter C. Pritchard (Marshall)	20
13	Marion Butler (Raleigh)	Populist	Mar 4, 1895 – Mar 3, 1901	Elected in 1894. Lost re-election.	19	54th	18	Elected in 1894 to finish Vance's term.	Jan 23, 1895 – Mar 3, 1903	Republican	Jeter C. Pritchard (Marshall)	20
13	Marion Butler (Raleigh)	Populist	Mar 4, 1895 – Mar 3, 1901	Elected in 1894. Lost re-election.	19	55th	19	Re-elected in 1897. Lost re-election.	Jan 23, 1895 – Mar 3, 1903	Republican	Jeter C. Pritchard (Marshall)	20
13	Marion Butler (Raleigh)	Populist	Mar 4, 1895 – Mar 3, 1901	Elected in 1894. Lost re-election.	19	56th	19	Re-elected in 1897. Lost re-election.	Jan 23, 1895 – Mar 3, 1903	Republican	Jeter C. Pritchard (Marshall)	20
14	F. M. Simmons (New Bern)	Democratic	Mar 4, 1901 – Mar 3, 1931	Elected in 1901.	20	57th	19	Re-elected in 1897. Lost re-election.	Jan 23, 1895 – Mar 3, 1903	Republican	Jeter C. Pritchard (Marshall)	20
14	F. M. Simmons (New Bern)	Democratic	Mar 4, 1901 – Mar 3, 1931	Elected in 1901.	20	58th	20	Elected in 1903.	Mar 4, 1903 – Dec 12, 1930	Democratic	Lee S. Overman (Salisbury)	21
14	F. M. Simmons (New Bern)	Democratic	Mar 4, 1901 – Mar 3, 1931	Elected in 1901.	20	59th	20	Elected in 1903.	Mar 4, 1903 – Dec 12, 1930	Democratic	Lee S. Overman (Salisbury)	21
14	F. M. Simmons (New Bern)	Democratic	Mar 4, 1901 – Mar 3, 1931	Re-elected in 1907.	21	60th	20	Elected in 1903.	Mar 4, 1903 – Dec 12, 1930	Democratic	Lee S. Overman (Salisbury)	21
14	F. M. Simmons (New Bern)	Democratic	Mar 4, 1901 – Mar 3, 1931	Re-elected in 1907.	21	61st	21	Re-elected in 1909	Mar 4, 1903 – Dec 12, 1930	Democratic	Lee S. Overman (Salisbury)	21
14	F. M. Simmons (New Bern)	Democratic	Mar 4, 1901 – Mar 3, 1931	Re-elected in 1907.	21	62nd	21	Re-elected in 1909	Mar 4, 1903 – Dec 12, 1930	Democratic	Lee S. Overman (Salisbury)	21
14	F. M. Simmons (New Bern)	Democratic	Mar 4, 1901 – Mar 3, 1931	Re-elected in 1913	22	63rd	21	Re-elected in 1909	Mar 4, 1903 – Dec 12, 1930	Democratic	Lee S. Overman (Salisbury)	21
14	F. M. Simmons (New Bern)	Democratic	Mar 4, 1901 – Mar 3, 1931	Re-elected in 1913	22	64th	22	Re-elected in 1914.	Mar 4, 1903 – Dec 12, 1930	Democratic	Lee S. Overman (Salisbury)	21
14	F. M. Simmons (New Bern)	Democratic	Mar 4, 1901 – Mar 3, 1931	Re-elected in 1913	22	65th	22	Re-elected in 1914.	Mar 4, 1903 – Dec 12, 1930	Democratic	Lee S. Overman (Salisbury)	21
14	F. M. Simmons (New Bern)	Democratic	Mar 4, 1901 – Mar 3, 1931	Re-elected in 1918.	23	66th	22	Re-elected in 1914.	Mar 4, 1903 – Dec 12, 1930	Democratic	Lee S. Overman (Salisbury)	21
14	F. M. Simmons (New Bern)	Democratic	Mar 4, 1901 – Mar 3, 1931	Re-elected in 1918.	23	67th	23	Re-elected in 1920.	Mar 4, 1903 – Dec 12, 1930	Democratic	Lee S. Overman (Salisbury)	21
14	F. M. Simmons (New Bern)	Democratic	Mar 4, 1901 – Mar 3, 1931	Re-elected in 1918.	23	68th	23	Re-elected in 1920.	Mar 4, 1903 – Dec 12, 1930	Democratic	Lee S. Overman (Salisbury)	21
14	F. M. Simmons (New Bern)	Democratic	Mar 4, 1901 – Mar 3, 1931	Re-elected in 1924. Lost renomination.	24	69th	23	Re-elected in 1920.	Mar 4, 1903 – Dec 12, 1930	Democratic	Lee S. Overman (Salisbury)	21
14	F. M. Simmons (New Bern)	Democratic	Mar 4, 1901 – Mar 3, 1931	Re-elected in 1924. Lost renomination.	24	70th	24	Re-elected in 1926. Died.	Mar 4, 1903 – Dec 12, 1930	Democratic	Lee S. Overman (Salisbury)	21
14	F. M. Simmons (New Bern)	Democratic	Mar 4, 1901 – Mar 3, 1931	Re-elected in 1924. Lost renomination.	24	71st	24	Re-elected in 1926. Died.	Mar 4, 1903 – Dec 12, 1930	Democratic	Lee S. Overman (Salisbury)	21
14	F. M. Simmons (New Bern)	Democratic	Mar 4, 1901 – Mar 3, 1931	Re-elected in 1924. Lost renomination.	24	71st	24	Appointed to continue Overman's term. Lost election to finish Overman's term.	Dec 13, 1930 – Dec 4, 1932	Democratic	Cameron A. Morrison (Charlotte)	22
15	Josiah Bailey (Raleigh)	Democratic	Mar 4, 1931 – Dec 15, 1946	Elected in 1930.	25	72nd	24	Appointed to continue Overman's term. Lost election to finish Overman's term.	Dec 13, 1930 – Dec 4, 1932	Democratic	Cameron A. Morrison (Charlotte)	22
15	Josiah Bailey (Raleigh)	Democratic	Mar 4, 1931 – Dec 15, 1946	Elected in 1930.	25	72nd	24	Elected to finish Overman's term.	Dec 5, 1932 – Jan 3, 1945	Democratic	Robert Reynolds (Asheville)	23
15	Josiah Bailey (Raleigh)	Democratic	Mar 4, 1931 – Dec 15, 1946	Elected in 1930.	25	73rd	25	Elected to full term in 1932.	Dec 5, 1932 – Jan 3, 1945	Democratic	Robert Reynolds (Asheville)	23
15	Josiah Bailey (Raleigh)	Democratic	Mar 4, 1931 – Dec 15, 1946	Elected in 1930.	25	74th	25	Elected to full term in 1932.	Dec 5, 1932 – Jan 3, 1945	Democratic	Robert Reynolds (Asheville)	23
15	Josiah Bailey (Raleigh)	Democratic	Mar 4, 1931 – Dec 15, 1946	Re-elected in 1936.	26	75th	25	Elected to full term in 1932.	Dec 5, 1932 – Jan 3, 1945	Democratic	Robert Reynolds (Asheville)	23
15	Josiah Bailey (Raleigh)	Democratic	Mar 4, 1931 – Dec 15, 1946	Re-elected in 1936.	26	76th	26	Re-elected in 1938. Retired.	Dec 5, 1932 – Jan 3, 1945	Democratic	Robert Reynolds (Asheville)	23
15	Josiah Bailey (Raleigh)	Democratic	Mar 4, 1931 – Dec 15, 1946	Re-elected in 1936.	26	77th	26	Re-elected in 1938. Retired.	Dec 5, 1932 – Jan 3, 1945	Democratic	Robert Reynolds (Asheville)	23
15	Josiah Bailey (Raleigh)	Democratic	Mar 4, 1931 – Dec 15, 1946	Re-elected in 1942. Died.	27	78th	26	Re-elected in 1938. Retired.	Dec 5, 1932 – Jan 3, 1945	Democratic	Robert Reynolds (Asheville)	23
15	Josiah Bailey (Raleigh)	Democratic	Mar 4, 1931 – Dec 15, 1946	Re-elected in 1942. Died.	27	79th	27	Elected in 1944.	Jan 3, 1945 – May 12, 1954	Democratic	Clyde R. Hoey (Shelby)	24
Vacant			Dec 15, 1946 – Dec 18, 1946		27	79th	27	Elected in 1944.	Jan 3, 1945 – May 12, 1954	Democratic	Clyde R. Hoey (Shelby)	24
16	William B. Umstead (Durham)	Democratic	Dec 18, 1946 – Dec 30, 1948	Appointed to continue Bailey's term. Lost election to finish Bailey's term.	27	79th	27	Elected in 1944.	Jan 3, 1945 – May 12, 1954	Democratic	Clyde R. Hoey (Shelby)	24
16	William B. Umstead (Durham)	Democratic	Dec 18, 1946 – Dec 30, 1948	Appointed to continue Bailey's term. Lost election to finish Bailey's term.	27	80th	27	Elected in 1944.	Jan 3, 1945 – May 12, 1954	Democratic	Clyde R. Hoey (Shelby)	24
17	J. Melville Broughton (Raleigh)	Democratic	Dec 31, 1948 – Mar 6, 1949	Elected to finish Bailey's term.	27	80th	27	Elected in 1944.	Jan 3, 1945 – May 12, 1954	Democratic	Clyde R. Hoey (Shelby)	24
17	J. Melville Broughton (Raleigh)	Democratic	Dec 31, 1948 – Mar 6, 1949	Elected to full term in 1948. Died.	28	81st	27	Elected in 1944.	Jan 3, 1945 – May 12, 1954	Democratic	Clyde R. Hoey (Shelby)	24
Vacant			Mar 6, 1949 – Mar 29, 1949		28	81st	27	Elected in 1944.	Jan 3, 1945 – May 12, 1954	Democratic	Clyde R. Hoey (Shelby)	24
18	Frank Graham (Chapel Hill)	Democratic	Mar 29, 1949 – Nov 26, 1950	Appointed to continue Broughton's term. Lost nomination to finish Broughton's term.	28	81st	27	Elected in 1944.	Jan 3, 1945 – May 12, 1954	Democratic	Clyde R. Hoey (Shelby)	24
19	Willis Smith (Raleigh)	Democratic	Nov 27, 1950 – Jun 26, 1953	Elected to finish Broughton's term. Died.	28	81st	27	Elected in 1944.	Jan 3, 1945 – May 12, 1954	Democratic	Clyde R. Hoey (Shelby)	24
19	Willis Smith (Raleigh)	Democratic	Nov 27, 1950 – Jun 26, 1953	Elected to finish Broughton's term. Died.	28	82nd	28	Re-elected in 1950. Died.	Jan 3, 1945 – May 12, 1954	Democratic	Clyde R. Hoey (Shelby)	24
19	Willis Smith (Raleigh)	Democratic	Nov 27, 1950 – Jun 26, 1953	Elected to finish Broughton's term. Died.	28	83rd	28	Re-elected in 1950. Died.	Jan 3, 1945 – May 12, 1954	Democratic	Clyde R. Hoey (Shelby)	24
Vacant			Jun 26, 1953 – Jul 10, 1953		28	83rd	28	Re-elected in 1950. Died.	Jan 3, 1945 – May 12, 1954	Democratic	Clyde R. Hoey (Shelby)	24
20	Alton Lennon (Wilmington)	Democratic	Jul 10, 1953 – Nov 28, 1954	Appointed to continue Broughton's term. Lost nomination to finish Broughton's term.	28	83rd	28	Re-elected in 1950. Died.	Jan 3, 1945 – May 12, 1954	Democratic	Clyde R. Hoey (Shelby)	24
20	Alton Lennon (Wilmington)	Democratic	Jul 10, 1953 – Nov 28, 1954	Appointed to continue Broughton's term. Lost nomination to finish Broughton's term.	28	83rd	28		May 12, 1954 – Jun 5, 1954	Vacant		
20	Alton Lennon (Wilmington)	Democratic	Jul 10, 1953 – Nov 28, 1954	Appointed to continue Broughton's term. Lost nomination to finish Broughton's term.	28	83rd	28	Appointed to continue Hoey's term. Elected in 1954 to finish Hoey's term.	Jun 5, 1954 – Dec 31, 1974	Democratic	Sam Ervin (Morganton)	25
21	W. Kerr Scott (Haw River)	Democratic	Nov 29, 1954 – Apr 16, 1958	Elected in 1954 to finish Broughton's term.	28	83rd	28	Appointed to continue Hoey's term. Elected in 1954 to finish Hoey's term.	Jun 5, 1954 – Dec 31, 1974	Democratic	Sam Ervin (Morganton)	25
21	W. Kerr Scott (Haw River)	Democratic	Nov 29, 1954 – Apr 16, 1958	Elected to full term in 1954. Died.	29	84th	28	Appointed to continue Hoey's term. Elected in 1954 to finish Hoey's term.	Jun 5, 1954 – Dec 31, 1974	Democratic	Sam Ervin (Morganton)	25
21	W. Kerr Scott (Haw River)	Democratic	Nov 29, 1954 – Apr 16, 1958	Elected to full term in 1954. Died.	29	85th	29	Re-elected in 1956.	Jun 5, 1954 – Dec 31, 1974	Democratic	Sam Ervin (Morganton)	25
Vacant			Apr 16, 1958 – Apr 19, 1958		29	85th	29	Re-elected in 1956.	Jun 5, 1954 – Dec 31, 1974	Democratic	Sam Ervin (Morganton)	25
22	B. Everett Jordan (Saxapahaw)	Democratic	Apr 19, 1958 – Jan 3, 1973	Appointed to continue Scott's term. Elected in 1958 to finish Scott's term.	29	85th	29	Re-elected in 1956.	Jun 5, 1954 – Dec 31, 1974	Democratic	Sam Ervin (Morganton)	25
22	B. Everett Jordan (Saxapahaw)	Democratic	Apr 19, 1958 – Jan 3, 1973	Appointed to continue Scott's term. Elected in 1958 to finish Scott's term.	29	86th	29	Re-elected in 1956.	Jun 5, 1954 – Dec 31, 1974	Democratic	Sam Ervin (Morganton)	25
22	B. Everett Jordan (Saxapahaw)	Democratic	Apr 19, 1958 – Jan 3, 1973	Re-elected in 1960.	30	87th	29	Re-elected in 1956.	Jun 5, 1954 – Dec 31, 1974	Democratic	Sam Ervin (Morganton)	25
22	B. Everett Jordan (Saxapahaw)	Democratic	Apr 19, 1958 – Jan 3, 1973	Re-elected in 1960.	30	88th	30	Re-elected in 1962.	Jun 5, 1954 – Dec 31, 1974	Democratic	Sam Ervin (Morganton)	25
22	B. Everett Jordan (Saxapahaw)	Democratic	Apr 19, 1958 – Jan 3, 1973	Re-elected in 1960.	30	89th	30	Re-elected in 1962.	Jun 5, 1954 – Dec 31, 1974	Democratic	Sam Ervin (Morganton)	25
22	B. Everett Jordan (Saxapahaw)	Democratic	Apr 19, 1958 – Jan 3, 1973	Re-elected in 1966. Lost renomination.	31	90th	30	Re-elected in 1962.	Jun 5, 1954 – Dec 31, 1974	Democratic	Sam Ervin (Morganton)	25
22	B. Everett Jordan (Saxapahaw)	Democratic	Apr 19, 1958 – Jan 3, 1973	Re-elected in 1966. Lost renomination.	31	91st	31	Re-elected in 1968. Retired and resigned early.	Jun 5, 1954 – Dec 31, 1974	Democratic	Sam Ervin (Morganton)	25
22	B. Everett Jordan (Saxapahaw)	Democratic	Apr 19, 1958 – Jan 3, 1973	Re-elected in 1966. Lost renomination.	31	92nd	31	Re-elected in 1968. Retired and resigned early.	Jun 5, 1954 – Dec 31, 1974	Democratic	Sam Ervin (Morganton)	25
23	Jesse Helms (Raleigh)	Republican	Jan 3, 1973 – Jan 3, 2003	Elected in 1972.	32	93rd	31	Re-elected in 1968. Retired and resigned early.	Jun 5, 1954 – Dec 31, 1974	Democratic	Sam Ervin (Morganton)	25
23	Jesse Helms (Raleigh)	Republican	Jan 3, 1973 – Jan 3, 2003	Elected in 1972.	32	93rd	31		Dec 31, 1974 – Jan 3, 1975	Vacant		
23	Jesse Helms (Raleigh)	Republican	Jan 3, 1973 – Jan 3, 2003	Elected in 1972.	32	94th	32	Elected in 1974. Lost re-election.	Jan 3, 1975 – Jan 3, 1981	Democratic	Robert Morgan (Lillington)	26
23	Jesse Helms (Raleigh)	Republican	Jan 3, 1973 – Jan 3, 2003	Elected in 1972.	32	95th	32	Elected in 1974. Lost re-election.	Jan 3, 1975 – Jan 3, 1981	Democratic	Robert Morgan (Lillington)	26
23	Jesse Helms (Raleigh)	Republican	Jan 3, 1973 – Jan 3, 2003	Re-elected in 1978.	33	96th	32	Elected in 1974. Lost re-election.	Jan 3, 1975 – Jan 3, 1981	Democratic	Robert Morgan (Lillington)	26
23	Jesse Helms (Raleigh)	Republican	Jan 3, 1973 – Jan 3, 2003	Re-elected in 1978.	33	97th	33	Elected in 1980. Died.	Jan 3, 1981 – Jun 29, 1986	Republican	John P. East (Greenville)	27
23	Jesse Helms (Raleigh)	Republican	Jan 3, 1973 – Jan 3, 2003	Re-elected in 1978.	33	98th	33	Elected in 1980. Died.	Jan 3, 1981 – Jun 29, 1986	Republican	John P. East (Greenville)	27
23	Jesse Helms (Raleigh)	Republican	Jan 3, 1973 – Jan 3, 2003	Re-elected in 1984.	34	99th	33	Elected in 1980. Died.	Jan 3, 1981 – Jun 29, 1986	Republican	John P. East (Greenville)	27
23	Jesse Helms (Raleigh)	Republican	Jan 3, 1973 – Jan 3, 2003	Re-elected in 1984.	34	99th	33		Jun 29, 1986 – Jul 14, 1986	Vacant		
23	Jesse Helms (Raleigh)	Republican	Jan 3, 1973 – Jan 3, 2003	Re-elected in 1984.	34	99th	33	Appointed to continue East's term. Lost election to finish East's term.	Jul 14, 1986 – Nov 4, 1986	Republican	Jim Broyhill (Lenoir)	28
23	Jesse Helms (Raleigh)	Republican	Jan 3, 1973 – Jan 3, 2003	Re-elected in 1984.	34	99th	33	Elected to finish East's term.	Nov 5, 1986 – Jan 3, 1993	Democratic	Terry Sanford (Durham)	29
23	Jesse Helms (Raleigh)	Republican	Jan 3, 1973 – Jan 3, 2003	Re-elected in 1984.	34	100th	34	Elected to full term in 1986. Lost re-election.	Nov 5, 1986 – Jan 3, 1993	Democratic	Terry Sanford (Durham)	29
23	Jesse Helms (Raleigh)	Republican	Jan 3, 1973 – Jan 3, 2003	Re-elected in 1984.	34	101st	34	Elected to full term in 1986. Lost re-election.	Nov 5, 1986 – Jan 3, 1993	Democratic	Terry Sanford (Durham)	29
23	Jesse Helms (Raleigh)	Republican	Jan 3, 1973 – Jan 3, 2003	Re-elected in 1990.	35	102nd	34	Elected to full term in 1986. Lost re-election.	Nov 5, 1986 – Jan 3, 1993	Democratic	Terry Sanford (Durham)	29
23	Jesse Helms (Raleigh)	Republican	Jan 3, 1973 – Jan 3, 2003	Re-elected in 1990.	35	103rd	35	Elected in 1992. Lost re-election.	Jan 3, 1993 – Jan 3, 1999	Republican	Lauch Faircloth (Clinton)	30
23	Jesse Helms (Raleigh)	Republican	Jan 3, 1973 – Jan 3, 2003	Re-elected in 1990.	35	104th	35	Elected in 1992. Lost re-election.	Jan 3, 1993 – Jan 3, 1999	Republican	Lauch Faircloth (Clinton)	30
23	Jesse Helms (Raleigh)	Republican	Jan 3, 1973 – Jan 3, 2003	Re-elected in 1996. Retired.	36	105th	35	Elected in 1992. Lost re-election.	Jan 3, 1993 – Jan 3, 1999	Republican	Lauch Faircloth (Clinton)	30
23	Jesse Helms (Raleigh)	Republican	Jan 3, 1973 – Jan 3, 2003	Re-elected in 1996. Retired.	36	106th	36	Elected in 1998. Retired to run for U.S. President.	Jan 3, 1999 – Jan 3, 2005	Democratic	John Edwards (Raleigh)	31
23	Jesse Helms (Raleigh)	Republican	Jan 3, 1973 – Jan 3, 2003	Re-elected in 1996. Retired.	36	107th	36	Elected in 1998. Retired to run for U.S. President.	Jan 3, 1999 – Jan 3, 2005	Democratic	John Edwards (Raleigh)	31
24	Elizabeth Dole (Salisbury)	Republican	Jan 3, 2003 – Jan 3, 2009	Elected in 2002. Lost re-election.	37	108th	36	Elected in 1998. Retired to run for U.S. President.	Jan 3, 1999 – Jan 3, 2005	Democratic	John Edwards (Raleigh)	31
24	Elizabeth Dole (Salisbury)	Republican	Jan 3, 2003 – Jan 3, 2009	Elected in 2002. Lost re-election.	37	109th	37	Elected in 2004.	Jan 3, 2005 – Jan 3, 2023	Republican	Richard Burr (Winston-Salem)	32
24	Elizabeth Dole (Salisbury)	Republican	Jan 3, 2003 – Jan 3, 2009	Elected in 2002. Lost re-election.	37	110th	37	Elected in 2004.	Jan 3, 2005 – Jan 3, 2023	Republican	Richard Burr (Winston-Salem)	32
25	Kay Hagan (Greensboro)	Democratic	Jan 3, 2009 – Jan 3, 2015	Elected in 2008. Lost re-election.	38	111th	37	Elected in 2004.	Jan 3, 2005 – Jan 3, 2023	Republican	Richard Burr (Winston-Salem)	32
25	Kay Hagan (Greensboro)	Democratic	Jan 3, 2009 – Jan 3, 2015	Elected in 2008. Lost re-election.	38	112th	38	Re-elected in 2010.	Jan 3, 2005 – Jan 3, 2023	Republican	Richard Burr (Winston-Salem)	32
25	Kay Hagan (Greensboro)	Democratic	Jan 3, 2009 – Jan 3, 2015	Elected in 2008. Lost re-election.	38	113th	38	Re-elected in 2010.	Jan 3, 2005 – Jan 3, 2023	Republican	Richard Burr (Winston-Salem)	32
26	Thom Tillis (Huntersville)	Republican	Jan 3, 2015 – present	Elected in 2014.	39	114th	38	Re-elected in 2010.	Jan 3, 2005 – Jan 3, 2023	Republican	Richard Burr (Winston-Salem)	32
26	Thom Tillis (Huntersville)	Republican	Jan 3, 2015 – present	Elected in 2014.	39	115th	39	Re-elected in 2016. Retired.	Jan 3, 2005 – Jan 3, 2023	Republican	Richard Burr (Winston-Salem)	32
26	Thom Tillis (Huntersville)	Republican	Jan 3, 2015 – present	Elected in 2014.	39	116th	39	Re-elected in 2016. Retired.	Jan 3, 2005 – Jan 3, 2023	Republican	Richard Burr (Winston-Salem)	32
26	Thom Tillis (Huntersville)	Republican	Jan 3, 2015 – present	Re-elected in 2020. Retiring at the end of term.	40	117th	39	Re-elected in 2016. Retired.	Jan 3, 2005 – Jan 3, 2023	Republican	Richard Burr (Winston-Salem)	32
26	Thom Tillis (Huntersville)	Republican	Jan 3, 2015 – present	Re-elected in 2020. Retiring at the end of term.	40	118th	40	Elected in 2022.	Jan 3, 2023 – present	Republican	Ted Budd (Advance)	33
26	Thom Tillis (Huntersville)	Republican	Jan 3, 2015 – present	Re-elected in 2020. Retiring at the end of term.	40	119th	40	Elected in 2022.	Jan 3, 2023 – present	Republican	Ted Budd (Advance)	33
27	Roy Cooper (elect) (Rocky Mount)	Democratic	Taking office Jan 3, 2027	Elected in 2026.	41	120th	40	Elected in 2022.	Jan 3, 2023 – present	Republican	Ted Budd (Advance)	33
27	Roy Cooper (elect) (Rocky Mount)	Democratic	Taking office Jan 3, 2027	Elected in 2026.	41	121st	41	To be determined in the 2028 election.				
27	Roy Cooper (elect) (Rocky Mount)	Democratic	Taking office Jan 3, 2027	Elected in 2026.	41	122nd	41	To be determined in the 2028 election.				
To be determined in the 2032 election.					42	123rd	41	To be determined in the 2028 election.				

== See also ==
- Elections in North Carolina
- List of United States representatives from North Carolina
- North Carolina's congressional delegations
