= 2028 United States Senate election in North Carolina =

Party	Republican	Democratic
Incumbent U.S. senator
Ted Budd
Republican

The 2028 United States Senate election in North Carolina will be held on November 7, 2028, to elect a member to the United States Senate to represent the state of North Carolina. Primary elections will take place on March 7, 2028, and runoffs will take place on May 16, 2028, if no candidate receives over 30% in the first round. Republican incumbent Ted Budd is seeking a second term.

He was elected in 2022 defeating Democratic former chief justice of the North Carolina Supreme Court Cheri Beasley with 50.5% of the vote.

== Background ==
North Carolina is expected to be a top Senate battleground in 2028, and a key target for Democrats to expand their majority, while a critical hold for Republicans if they want to regain lost ground after 2026. North Carolina is a battleground state where both parties have seen success in recent years. In 2026, Democrat Roy Cooper won the the Class II Senate race by nearly 20%, becoming the first Democrat to win a Senate race in North Carolina since 2008. Additionally, Democrats won the 2026 North Carolina House of Representatives election, winning the chamber for the first time since 2008. Additionally, the North Carolina Council of State is evenly split after Democrats picked up a net of one race in 2024 North Carolina Council of State elections, including a landslide win in the 2024 North Carolina gubernatorial election. However, Republicans maintain a majority in the North Carolina Senate, and Republicans have won the last four presidential elections in the state.

== Republican primary ==
==== Declared ====
- Ted Budd, incumbent U.S senator (2023–present)

==== Filed paperwork ====
- Zachary Brown, business consultant
- Gavin Solomon, businessman
- Mark Walker, former U.S. representative for NC-06 (2015–2021)

== Democratic primary ==
==== Filed paperwork ====
- Sharese Beasley

==== Publicly expressed interest ====
- Don Davis, U.S. representative for NC-01 (2023–present)
- Wiley Nickel, Wake County District Attorney-elect and former U.S. representative for NC-13 (2023–2025) (if Jackson doesn't run)

==== Potential ====
- Jeff Jackson, North Carolina attorney general (2025–present) and former U.S. representative for NC-14 (2023–2025)

== Independents ==
==== Filed paperwork ====
- Shaunesi DeBerry, social media personality
