= Addison Hewlett =

American politician and attorney

George Addison Hewlett Jr. (1912–1989) was a North Carolina politician and attorney.

He was educated at Wake Forest College and graduated from Wake Forest's law school in 1934. The same year he was admitted to the bar and entered legal practice in Wilmington, North Carolina. Hewlett joined the U.S. Army as a private in 1942 and served in the Army Air Force, ending World War II as a captain. Returning to Wilmington after the war, he resumed the practice of law and in 1948 was elected president of the New Hanover County Bar Association. A Democrat like his father (a New Hanover County commissioner), Hewlett represented New Hanover County in the North Carolina House of Representatives from 1951 to 1961. In 1959, he was elected speaker of the state House.

In 1960, Hewlett ran for the U.S. Senate, losing in the Democratic primary to incumbent B. Everett Jordan. Hewlett garnered about 36 percent of the vote in a four-way race.

Hewlett served on the North Carolina State Board of Education and in 1968 became first chairman of the state's Marine Science Council. He was instrumental in the creation of the University of North Carolina Wilmington. He served as a UNCW trustee from 1973 to 1985 and was chairman of the trustees from 1975 to 1977. A dormitory, Hewlett Hall, is named for him at UNCW. Hewlett also served as chairman two other institutions of higher learning, Wake Forest College and Campbell University.
