= 1960 United States Senate election in North Carolina =

- November 8, 1960
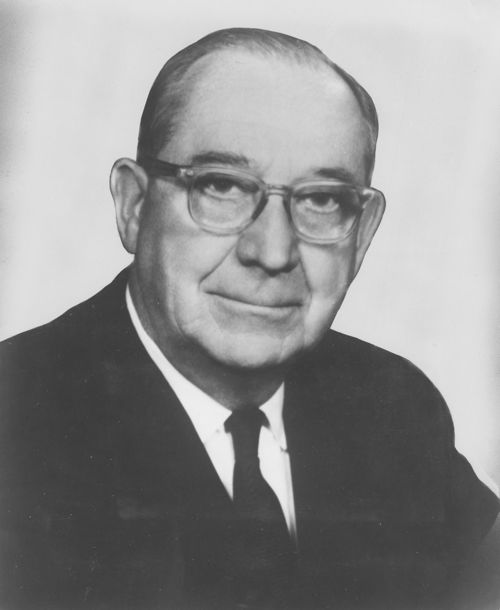

Nominee	B. Everett Jordan	R. Kyle Hayes
Party	Democratic	Republican
Popular vote	793,521	497,964
Percentage	61.44%	38.56%
- County results Jordan: 50–60% 60–70% 70–80% 80–90% >90% Hayes: 50–60% 60–70% 70–80%
Senator before election
B. Everett Jordan
Democratic
Elected Senator
B. Everett Jordan
Democratic

The 1960 United States Senate election in North Carolina was held on November 8, 1960. Incumbent Democratic Senator B. Everett Jordan was re-elected to a full term in office, defeating Republican Wilkes County attorney R. Kyle Hayes.

The simultaneous victories of Jordan, gubernatorial nominee Terry Sanford and presidential nominee John F. Kennedy marked the last time Democrats won all three top contests in North Carolina on the same day until 2008.

== Democratic primary ==
=== Candidates ===
- Robert Gregory
- Addison Hewlett, Speaker of the North Carolina House of Representatives
- B. Everett Jordan, incumbent U.S. Senator since 1958
- Robert M. McIntosh

23.6% of the voting age population participated in the Democratic primary.

=== Results ===
1960 Democratic Senate primary
Party	Candidate	Votes	%
Democratic	B. Everett Jordan (incumbent)	324,188	54.25%
Democratic	Addison Hewlett	217,899	36.47%
Democratic	Robert Gregory	31,463	5.27%
Democratic	Robert M. McIntosh	23,988	4.01%
Total votes		597,538	100.00%

== General election ==
=== Results ===
1960 U.S. Senate election in North Carolina
Party	Candidate	Votes	%	±%
Democratic	B. Everett Jordan (incumbent)	793,521	61.44	▼8.55
Republican	R. Kyle Hayes	497,964	38.56	▲8.55
Total votes		1,291,485	100.00%	

== Works cited ==
- Steed, Robert; Moreland, Laurence; Baker, Tod, eds. (1980). Party Politics in the South. Praeger Publishers. ISBN 0030565863.
