= 1966 United States Senate election in North Carolina =

- November 8, 1966
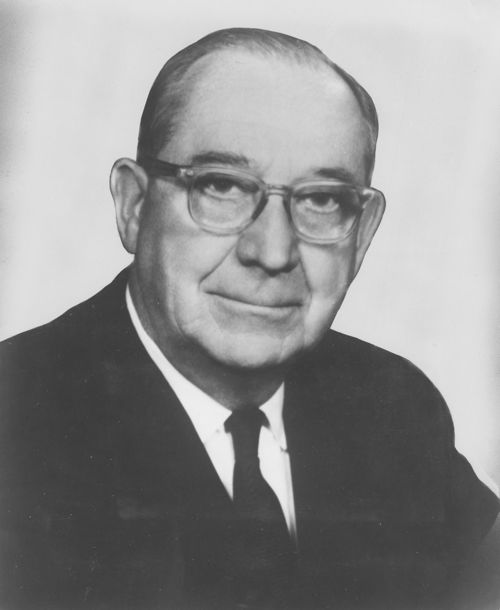

Nominee	B. Everett Jordan	John Shallcross
Party	Democratic	Republican
Popular vote	501,440	400,502
Percentage	55.59%	44.40%
- County results Everett: 50–60% 60–70% 70–80% 80–90% Shallcross: 50–60% 60–70%
U.S. senator before election
B. Everett Jordan
Democratic
Elected U.S. Senator
B. Everett Jordan
Democratic

The 1966 United States Senate election in North Carolina was held on November 8, 1966. Incumbent Democratic Senator B. Everett Jordan was re-elected to a second term in office over Republican businessman John Shallcross. Democrats would not win this seat again until 2008.

== Democratic primary ==
=== Candidates ===
- B. Everett Jordan, incumbent Senator since 1958
- Hubert E. Seymour Jr., Greensboro attorney

20.8% of the voting age population participated in the Democratic primary.

=== Results ===
1966 Democratic Senate primary
Party	Candidate	Votes	%
Democratic	B. Everett Jordan (incumbent)	445,454	79.26%
Democratic	Hubert E. Seymour Jr.	116,548	20.74%
Total votes		562,002	100.00%

== General election ==
=== Results ===
1966 U.S. Senate election in North Carolina
Party	Candidate	Votes	%	±%
Democratic	B. Everett Jordan (incumbent)	501,440	55.59%	▼5.85
Republican	John Shallcross	400,502	44.40%	▲5.84
Independent Republican	Donald Badgley (write-in)	36	0.00%	N/A
Independent	Wade H. Shugart Jr. (write-in)	2	0.00%	N/A
Total votes		1,472,540	100.00%	

== Works cited ==
- Steed, Robert; Moreland, Laurence; Baker, Tod, eds. (1980). Party Politics in the South. Praeger Publishers. ISBN 0030565863.
