= B. Everett Jordan =

American politician (1896–1974)

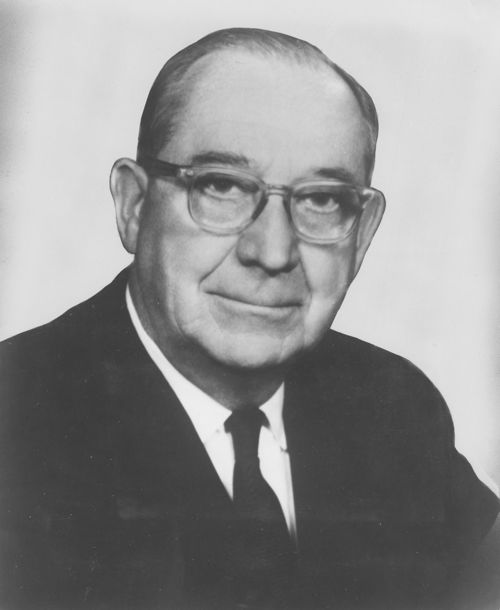
- Official U.S. Senate portrait

United States Senator from North Carolina
- In office April 19, 1958 – January 3, 1973
- Preceded by: William Kerr Scott
- Succeeded by: Jesse Helms

Personal details
- Born: Benjamin Everett Jordan; September 8, 1896 Ramseur, North Carolina, U.S.
- Died: March 15, 1974 (aged 77) Saxapahaw, North Carolina, U.S.
- Party: Democratic
- Spouse: Katherine McLean
- Children: 3

Benjamin Everett Jordan (September 8, 1896 – March 15, 1974) was an American businessman and politician. A member of the Democratic Party, he served as a United States Senator from North Carolina from 1958 to 1973.

== Early life and education ==
The eldest of six children, B. Everett Jordan was born in Ramseur, North Carolina, to Rev. Henry Harrison and Annie Elizabeth (née Sellars) Jordan. His father was a Methodist minister who also worked as a circuit rider. After receiving his early education at public schools, he attended Rutherford College Preparatory School from 1912 to 1913.

In 1914, Jordan enrolled at Trinity College (now Duke University) in Durham. He dropped out the following year and moved to Wellington, Kansas, where he went to work at his uncle's jewelry store. Towards the end of World War I, he served overseas with the Tank Corps from 1918 until 1919. He was later assigned to the occupation forces in Germany.

== Business career ==
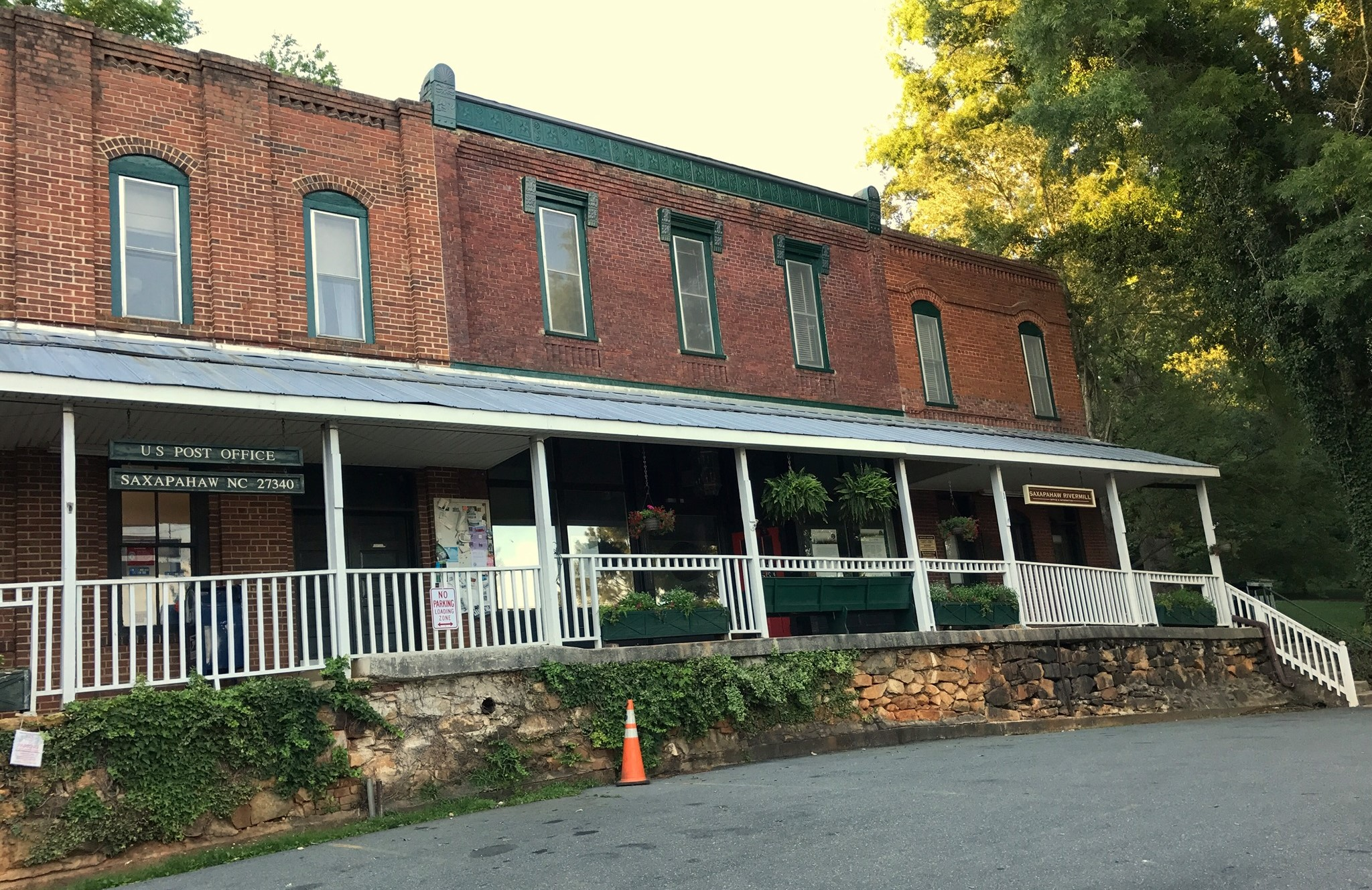
Jordan Drive in Saxapahaw

Following his military service, Jordan returned to North Carolina and became a floor sweeper at Myrtle Textile Mill in Gastonia. He became the plant superintendent of the Gastonia Textile Company in 1923. Four years later, in 1927, he and his family purchased an abandoned textile mill in Saxapahaw, renaming it Sellars Manufacturing Company. He served as the company's secretary-treasurer and general manager, later turning over management to his sons in order to focus on his political career. He also helped revive the Saxapahaw community, employing local residents and building a community center.

In addition to working with his family's business, Jordan served as general manager, treasurer, and director of the Jordan Spinning Company near Franklinville, and held the same positions with the Royal Cotton Mill Company in Wake Forest. He was also secretary-treasurer of the National Processing Company in Burlington, and director of the Cotton Textile Institute and of the North Carolina Cotton Manufacturers Association. A devout Methodist like his father, he was an adult Bible instructor (1927–1958), chairman of the Methodist Board of Stewards (1930–1950), and vice-president of the Board of Methodist Colleges (1952–1956).

== Political career ==
Jordan became active in Democratic politics in the 1930s, working as a fundraiser for the North Carolina Democratic Party. W. Kerr Scott, the husband of Jordan's first cousin, was elected Governor of North Carolina in 1948. From 1949 to 1954, Jordan served as chairman of the Democratic State Executive Committee. He was a Democratic National Committeeman from 1954 to 1958. He also served as a member of the North Carolina Peace Officers Benefit and Retirement Commission (1943–1958) and of the North Carolina Medical Care Commission (1945–1951), and chairman of the board of trustees of Alamance County General Hospital.

=== U.S. Senate ===
Governor Scott had been elected a United States Senator in 1954, but died four years later. On April 19, 1958, Jordan was appointed to the Senate by Governor Luther H. Hodges to fill the vacancy caused by Scott's death. On November 4 of that year, Jordan was elected to complete the final two years of Scott's term, defeating Republican Richard C. Clarke Jr. by a margin of 70%–30%.

As chairman of the Senate Committee on Rules and Administration (1963–1973), Jordan led the investigation of Senate aide Bobby Baker in 1964. Jordan supported research in medical science and agriculture, industrial uses of farm products, missile development, and space exploration. He sponsored the Cotton Allotment Transfer Act, which assisted farmers with small allotments. Like most Southern senators, Jordan was a supporter of segregation. Although he supported the Gulf of Tonkin Resolution in 1964, he later joined a majority of senators in calling for American forces to be brought home. At this, his senior colleague, Sam Ervin, asked him, "Everett, have you lost your mind?"

Jordan was re-elected to the Senate in 1960 and 1966. He was unseated in the 1972 Democratic primary by Representative Nick Galifianakis of Durham. Jordan polled only 44.5 percent in the primary, to 55.5 percent for Galifianakis, who in turn was defeated by Republican Jesse Helms in the general election. At the time, Jordan was 76 and his health was beginning to fail.

=== 1972 sniper incident ===
On May 29, 1972, Jordan escaped injury during a shooting while campaigning at Raleigh's North Hills Shopping Center, when 22-year-old Harvey Glenn McLeod opened fire from the parking lot with a Ruger 10/22 rifle, killing four people and injuring seven others before dying of suicide. Jordan press aide Wes Hayden sustained critical injuries in the shooting; he made a surprisingly swift recovery and returned to his office in just one month. McLeod's motives were unclear, although his mother described him as "nervous and depressed" prior to the incident. He was not believed to be targeting Jordan, whose campaign stop at the shopping center was unannounced.

== Death and legacy ==
Jordan died at his home in Saxapahaw, at age 77. He is buried at Pine Hill Cemetery in Burlington.

B. Everett Jordan Lake, in Chatham County, North Carolina, is named for Senator Jordan, as well as the elementary school in Saxapahaw, North Carolina, B. Everett Jordan Elementary School, part of the Alamance-Burlington School System.

== Personal life ==
In 1924, Jordan married Katherine McLean, to whom he remained married until his death. The couple had two sons, Benjamin Everett Jr. and John McLean, and one daughter, Rose Ann.

Party political offices
Preceded by W. Kerr Scott	Democratic nominee for U.S. Senator from North Carolina (Class 2); 1958, 1960, 1966	Succeeded by Nick Galifianakis
U.S. Senate
Preceded by William Kerr Scott	U.S. senator (Class 2) from North Carolina; April 19, 1958 – January 3, 1973; Served alongside: Sam Ervin	Succeeded by Jesse Helms
