= 1950 United States Senate election in North Carolina =

- November 7, 1950
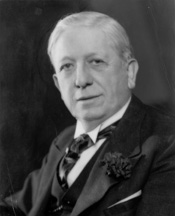

Nominee	Clyde R. Hoey	Halsey B. Leavitt
Party	Democratic	Republican
Popular vote	376,472	171,804
Percentage	68.67%	31.34%
- County results Hoey: 50–60% 60–70% 70–80% 80–90% 90–100% Leavitt: 50–60% 60–70% 70–80%
Senator before election
Clyde R. Hoey
Democratic
Elected Senator
Clyde R. Hoey
Democratic

The 1950 United States Senate election in North Carolina was held on November 7, 1950. Incumbent Democratic Senator Clyde R. Hoey was re-elected to a second term in office over Republican Halsey B. Leavitt.

== General election ==
=== Candidates ===
- Clyde R. Hoey, incumbent Senator since 1945 (Democratic)
- Halsey B. Leavitt, insurance executive (Republican)

=== Results ===
1950 U.S. Senate election in North Carolina
Party	Candidate	Votes	%	±%
Democratic	Clyde R. Hoey (incumbent)	376,472	68.67%	▼1.58
Republican	Halsey B. Leavitt	171,804	31.34%	▲1.58
Total votes		548,276	100.00%	
