= 2008 United States Senate election in North Carolina =

- November 4, 2008
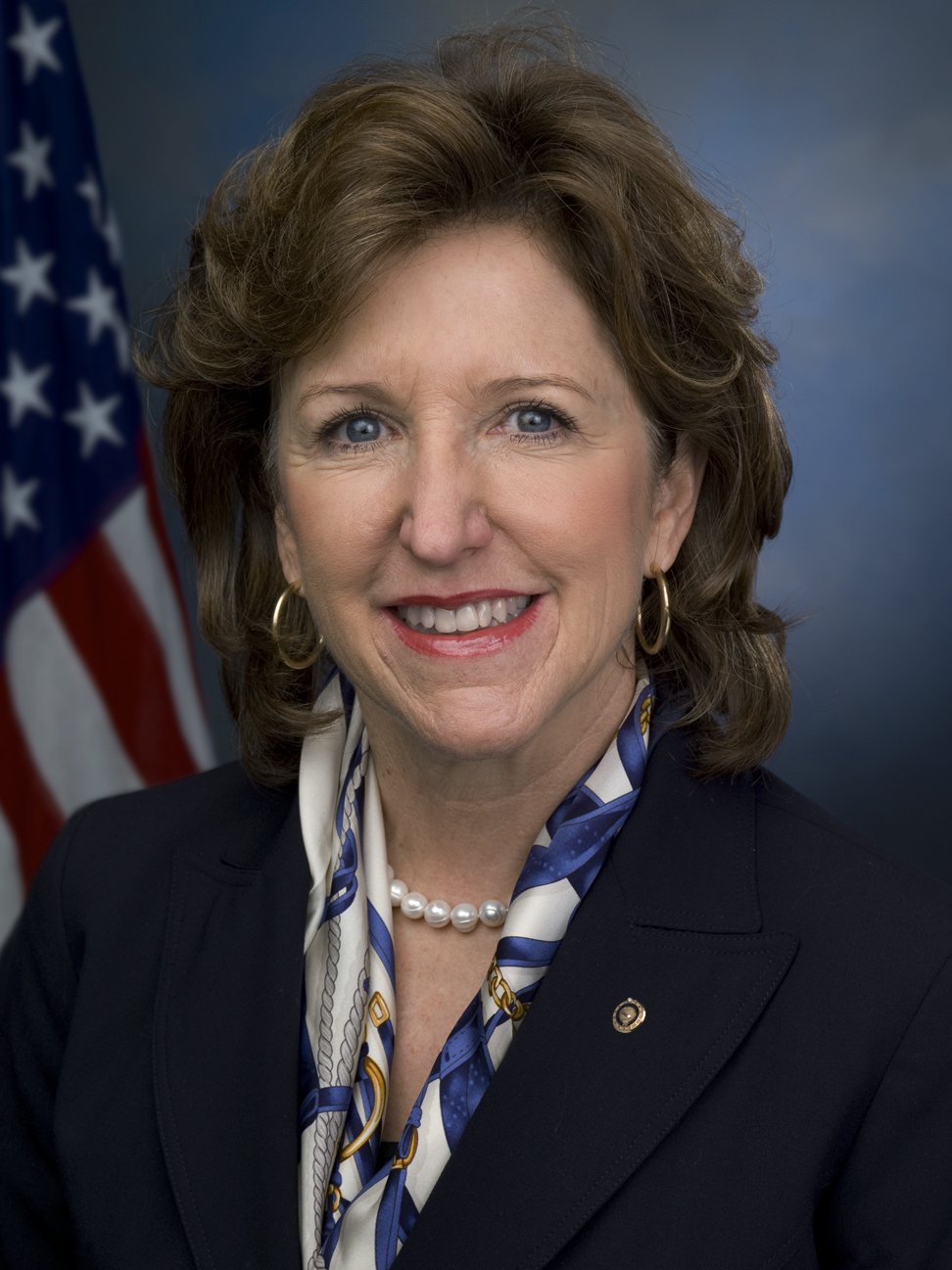

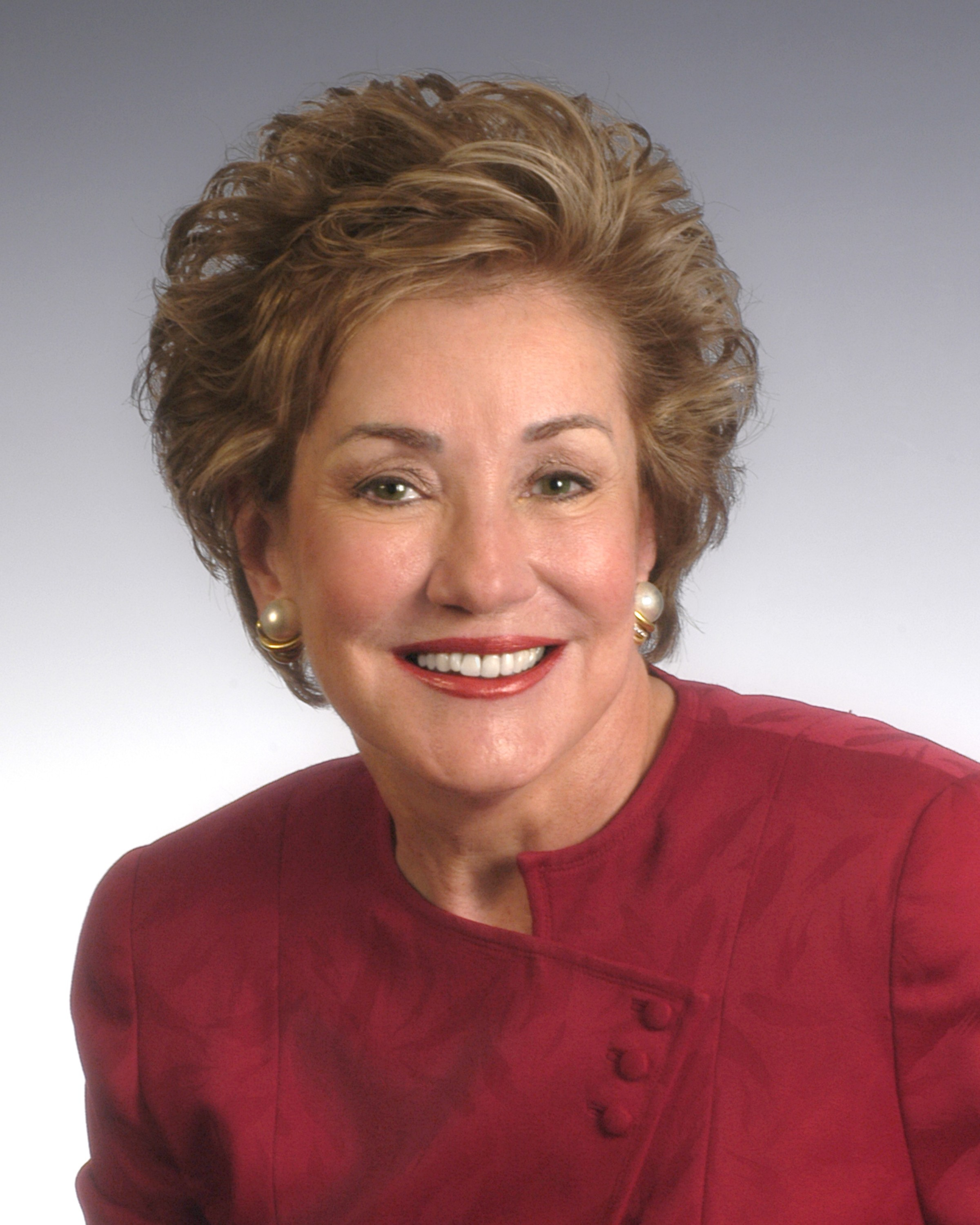
Nominee	Kay Hagan	Elizabeth Dole
Party	Democratic	Republican
Popular vote	2,249,311	1,887,510
Percentage	52.65%	44.18%
- Hagan: 40–50% 50–60% 60–70% 70–80% 80–90% >90% Dole: 40–50% 50–60% 60–70% 70–80% 80–90%
U.S. senator before election
Elizabeth Dole
Republican
Elected U.S. Senator
Kay Hagan
Democratic

The 2008 United States Senate election in North Carolina was held on November 4, 2008, to elect a member of the United States Senate to represent the state of North Carolina. Democratic state senator Kay Hagan defeated Republican incumbent Elizabeth Dole.

This was the first time in North Carolina history, and only the eighth time in U.S. history, that the two major-party candidates for a U.S. Senate seat were both women. Hagan became the first woman to defeat an incumbent woman in a U.S. Senate election. This was the last time that a Democrat won a U.S. Senate race in North Carolina until 2026.

== Republican primary ==
=== Candidates ===
==== Nominee ====
- Elizabeth Dole, incumbent U.S. senator (2003–2009)

==== Eliminated in primary ====
- Pete DiLauro

=== Results ===
Republican primary results
Party	Candidate	Votes	%
Republican	Elizabeth Dole (incumbent)	460,665	90.0%
Republican	Pete DiLauro	51,406	10.0%
Total votes		512,071	100.0%

== Democratic primary ==
=== Candidates ===
==== Nominee ====
- Kay Hagan, state senator from the 27th district (1999–2009)

==== Eliminated in primary ====
- Duskin Lassiter, trucker
- Jim Neal, businessman
- Howard Staley, doctor
- Marcus Williams, attorney

==== Declined ====
- Mike Easley, governor of North Carolina (2001–2009)
- Jim Hunt, former governor of North Carolina (1977–1985, 1993–2001)
- Brad Miller, U.S. representative from North Carolina's 13th congressional district (2003–2013)

=== Campaign ===
Hagan, initially an unknown politician, decided to challenge Elizabeth Dole.

National Democrats attempted to recruit incumbent Governor Mike Easley to make the race. Easley declined to run, as did Congressman Brad Miller, who expressed interest in early 2007. Former Governor Jim Hunt, who was defeated in 1984 by Dole's predecessor Jesse Helms, also declined to compete against Dole.

Neal earned the endorsement of the Black Political Caucus of Charlotte-Mecklenburg. He was also endorsed by Blue America PAC, eQualityGiving, the Independent Weekly and YES! Weekly.

=== Polling ===
Poll source	Date(s) administered	Sample size (Note: Key: A – all adults RV – registered voters LV – likely voters V – unclear)	Margin of error	Kay Hagan	Jim Neal	Marcus Williams	Other	Undecided
Mason-Dixon Polling & Strategy	April 28–29, 2008	400 (LV)	± 4.9%	42%	17%	5%	3% (Note: Lassiter with 2% and Staley with 1%)	33%

=== Results ===
Democratic primary results
Party	Candidate	Votes	%
Democratic	Kay Hagan	801,920	60.1%
Democratic	Jim Neal	239,623	18.0%
Democratic	Marcus W. Williams	170,970	12.8%
Democratic	Duskin Lassiter	62,136	4.6%
Democratic	Howard Staley	60,403	4.5%
Total votes		1,335,052	100.0%

== Libertarian primary ==
=== Candidates ===
==== Nominee ====
- Chris Cole, perennial candidate

== General election ==
=== Campaign ===
Dole's attack ad, "Godless"

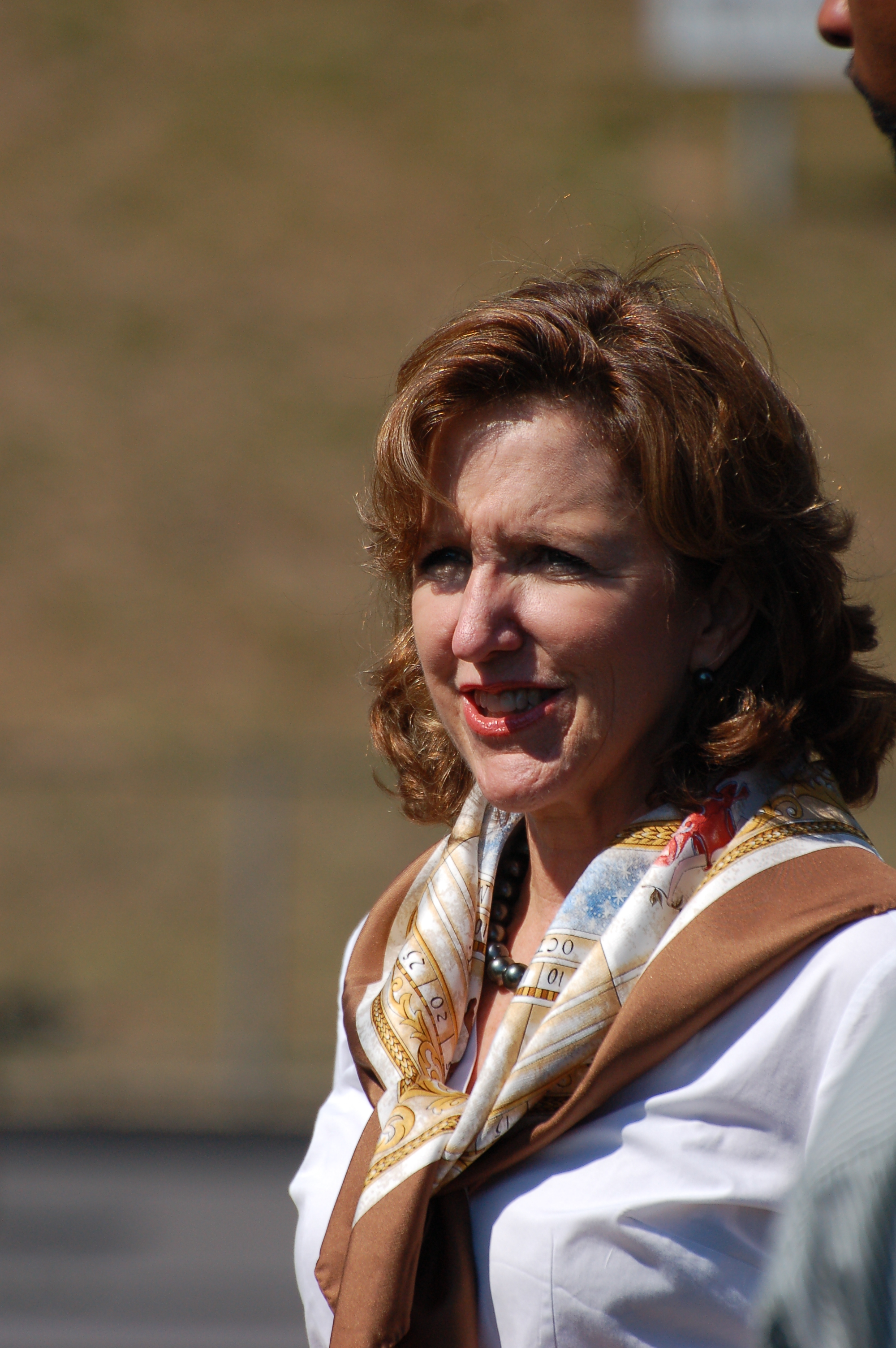
Hagan on the campaign trail

Dole was initially a heavy favorite for reelection, especially after several potential top-tier challengers such as Congressman Brad Miller, Governor Mike Easley and former Governor Jim Hunt all declined to compete against Dole. Ultimately, Kay Hagan, a state senator from Greensboro, won the Democratic primary election and became Dole's general election opponent. Reports late in the campaign suggested that Dole, once considered a safe bet for reelection, suffered from Barack Obama's decision to aggressively contest North Carolina in the presidential election.

Hagan was initially given little chance against Dole, but Hagan was helped by independent 527 groups lobbying/advertising against incumbent Dole. The Democratic Senate Campaign Committee expended more money in North Carolina than in any other state during the 2008 election season. However, Dole benefited from more out-of-state funding overall than Hagan. The efforts appeared to be effective, as Hagan began to take the lead in several polls beginning in September.

==== Godless Americans ads ====
In late October, Dole released a controversial television ad attacking Hagan for reportedly taking donations from individuals involved in the Godless Americans PAC, a group which advocates for the rights of people who do not believe in God. The ad also included a female voice saying, "There is no God." The Dole campaign said the ad correctly shows who Hagan will associate with in order to raise campaign funds, and on November 1, Bob Dole also defended it, asserting that "it never questions her faith," and that "the issue is why she was there. There's no question about her faith. I think it's [the ad's] fair game." Hagan, who is a member of the Presbyterian Church and a former Sunday school teacher, condemned the ad as "fabricated and pathetic," and, according to Hagan's campaign website, a cease and desist was "hand-delivered to Dole's Raleigh office, faxed to her Salisbury office and sent to her home at the Watergate in Washington, DC." Hagan also filed a lawsuit in Wake County Superior Court accusing Dole of defamation and libel.

The ad has met exceptionally strong criticism from the public as well as many local and several national media outlets. CNN's Campbell Brown said about the ad: "[A]mid all the attack ads on the airwaves competing to out-ugly one another, we think we've found a winner." The ad was harshly criticized in editorials in The Chicago Tribune, The Charlotte Observer, the Asheville Citizen-Times, and the Greensboro News & Record. Another ad issued by the Dole campaign in mid-October 2008 was described in The Fayetteville Observer as "[setting] the low mark in negative political campaigning." The Miami Herald reported that within 48 hours of the first ad airing, Hagan received over 3,600 contributions from major donors and atheists, agnostics and followers of other religious beliefs who felt they were being attacked by Dole. Following the second ad, Hagan's lead doubled according to some polls.

=== Predictions ===
Source	Ranking	As of
The Cook Political Report	Tossup	October 23, 2008
CQ Politics	Lean D (flip)	October 31, 2008
Rothenberg Political Report	Lean D (flip)	November 2, 2008
Real Clear Politics	Tossup	November 2, 2008

=== Polling ===
Aggregate polls

Source of poll aggregation	Dates administered	Dates updated	Elizabeth Dole (R)	Kay Hagan (D)	Other/Undecided (Note: Calculated by taking the difference of 100% and all other candidates combined.)	Margin
RealClearPolitics	October 28–November 2, 2008	November 2, 2008	45.0%	49.3%	6.7%	Hagan +4.3%

Poll source	Date(s) administered	Sample size	Margin of error	Elizabeth Dole (R)	Kay Hagan (D)	Other	Undecided
Public Policy Polling (D)	October 31 – November 2, 2008	2,100 (LV)	± 2.1%	44%	51%	3% (Note: Chris Cole (L) with 3%)	1%
SurveyUSA (Note: Poll sponsored by WTVD-TV)	October 30 – November 2, 2008	682 (LV)	± 3.8%	43%	50%	5% (Note: Chris Cole (L) with 5%)	2%
Mason-Dixon Polling & Strategy	October 29–30, 2008	625 (LV)	–	46%	45%	–	9%
Research 2000 (Note: Poll sponsored by Daily Kos)	October 28–30, 2008	600 (LV)	± 4.0%	45%	50%	3%	2%
Rasmussen Reports	October 29, 2008	700 (LV)	± 4.0%	46%	52%	–	2%
Tel Opinion Research (R) (Note: Poll sponsored by the Civitas Institute)	October 27–29, 2008	600 (LV)	± 4.2%	43%	45%	4% (Note: Chris Cole (L) with 4%)	7%
CNN/TIME/Opinion Research Corporation	October 23–28, 2008	667 (LV)	± 4.0%	44%	53%	–	3%
Financial Dynamics (Note: Poll commissioned by Allstate and National Journal)	October 23–27, 2008	402 (RV)	± 4.9%	37%	43%	–	20%
Public Policy Polling (D)	October 25–26, 2008	1,038 (LV)	± 2.8%	45%	48%	4% (Note: Chris Cole (L) with 4%)	3%
GfK Roper Public Affairs & Media (Note: Poll commissioned by the Associated Press)	October 22–26, 2008	601 (LV)	± 4.0%	43%	47%	7% (Note: Chris Cole (L) with 2%, Neither/Other candidate with 5%, Refused with 1%)	1%
Mason-Dixon Polling & Strategy (Note: Poll commissioned by NBC News)	October 22–24, 2008	800 (LV)	± 3.5%	46%	42%	3% (Note: Chris Cole (L) with 3%)	9%
Marshall Marketing & Communications (Note: Poll commissioned by WSOC)	October 20–21, 2008	500 (LV)	± 4.5%	43%	44%	5%	8%
Tel Opinion Research (R)	October 18–20, 2008	600 (RV)	± 4.2%	41%	44%	4% (Note: Chris Cole (L) with 4%)	11%
SurveyUSA	October 18–20, 2008	627 (LV)	± 4.0%	45%	46%	5% (Note: Chris Cole (L) with 5%)	3%
Public Policy Polling (D)	October 18–19, 2008	1,200 (LV)	± 2.8%	42%	49%	4% (Note: Chris Cole (L) with 4%)	5%
Research 2000	October 14–15, 2008	600 (LV)	± 4.0%	45%	49%	3%	3%
Public Policy Polling (D)	October 11–12, 2008	1,196 (LV)	± 2.8%	44%	46%	5% (Note: Chris Cole (L) with 5%)	5%
Rasmussen Reports	October 8, 2008	700 (LV)	–	44%	49%	–	7%
Tel Opinion Research (R)	October 6–8, 2008	600 (LV)	± 4.0%	42%	45%	2% (Note: Chris Cole (L) with 2%)	11%
WSOC-TV	October 6–7, 2008	500 (LV)	± 4.5%	43%	44%	4%	9%
SurveyUSA	October 5–6, 2008	617 (LV)	± 4.0%	44%	43%	7% (Note: Chris Cole (L) with 7%)	6%
Public Policy Polling (D)	September 28–29, 2008	1,041 (LV)	± 3.0%	38%	46%	6% (Note: Chris Cole (L) with 6%)	10%
Rasmussen Reports	September 23, 2008	500 (LV)	–	45%	48%	–	7%
Tel Opinion Research (R)	September 17–20, 2008	600 (RV)	± 4.2%	43%	41%	5% (Note: Chris Cole (L) with 5%)	11%
Public Policy Polling (D)	September 17–19, 2008	1,060 (LV)	± 3.0%	41%	46%	6% (Note: Chris Cole (L) with 6%)	7%
Rasmussen Reports	September 18, 2008	500 (LV)	–	45%	51%	–	4%
Research 2000	September 8–10, 2008	600 (LV)	± 4.0%	48%	42%	4%	6%
Public Policy Polling (D)	September 9, 2008	626 (LV)	± 3.9%	42%	43%	6% (Note: Chris Cole (L) with 6%)	9%
SurveyUSA	September 6–8, 2008	671 (LV)	± 3.9%	48%	40%	7% (Note: Chris Cole (L) with 7%)	5%
Garin-Hart-Yang Research Group (D) (Note: Poll sponsored by Perdue's gubernatorial campaign)	September 5–7, 2008	605 (LV)	–	48%	46%	–	6%
Greenberg Quinlan Rosner Research (D) (Note: Poll sponsored by Democracy Corp)	August 20–26, 2008	852 (LV)	± 3.4%	45%	50%	–	6%
InsiderAdvantage/Majority Opinion Research	August 19, 2008	614 (LV)	± 3.8%	40%	40%	7%	14%
Tel Opinion Research (R)	August 14–17, 2008	600 (LV)	± 4.2%	44%	41%	4% (Note: Chris Cole (L) with 4%)	11%
SurveyUSA	August 9–11, 2008	655 (LV)	± 3.9%	46%	41%	7% (Note: Chris Cole (L) with 7%)	5%
Research 2000	July 28–30, 2008	600 (LV)	± 4.0%	50%	42%	–	8%
Public Policy Polling (D)	July 23–27, 2008	823 (LV)	± 3.4%	49%	40%	4% (Note: Chris Cole (L) with 4%)	7%
Tel Opinion Research (R)	July 14–16, 2008	600 (RV)	± 4.0%	47%	38%	2% (Note: Chris Cole (L) with 2%)	13%
Rasmussen Reports	July 15, 2008	500 (LV)	± 4.5%	53%	41%	1%	4%
SurveyUSA	July 12–14, 2008	676 (LV)	± 3.8%	54%	42%	–	4%
Tarrance Group (R) (Note: Poll sponsored by Dole's campaign)	July 7–9, 2008	550 (LV)	± 4.2%	51%	36%	6% (Note: Chris Cole (L) with 6%)	7%
Public Policy Polling (D)	June 26–29, 2008	1,048 (LV)	± 3.0%	51%	37%	–	12%
Tel Opinion Research (R)	June 11–13, 2008	600 (RV)	± 4.0%	48%	38%	1% (Note: Chris Cole (L) with 1%)	13%
Rasmussen Reports	June 10, 2008	500 (LV)	± 4.5%	53%	39%	2%	3%
Public Policy Polling (D)	May 28–29, 2008	543 (LV)	± 4.2%	47%	39%	–	14%
Anzalone Liszt Research (D) (Note: Poll sponsored by Hagan's campaign)	May 14–21, 2008	800 (LV)	± 3.5%	48%	44%	–	8%
SurveyUSA	May 17–19, 2008	713 (LV)	± 3.7%	50%	46%	–	4%
Tel Opinion Research (R)	May 14–17, 2008	800 (RV)	± 3.7%	45%	43%	–	12%
Public Policy Polling (D)	May 8–9, 2008	616 (LV)	± 4.0%	48%	43%	–	10%
Rasmussen Reports	May 8, 2008	500 (LV)	± 4.5%	47%	48%	2%	3%
Research 2000	April 28–30, 2008	600 (LV)	± 4.0%	48%	41%	–	11%
Rasmussen Reports	April 10, 2008	500 (LV)	± 4.5%	52%	39%	3%	6%
Public Policy Polling (D)	February 18, 2008	686 (LV)	± 3.7%	50%	33%	–	18%
Rasmussen Reports	December 19, 2007	500 (LV)	± 4.5%	55%	35%	4%	6%
Research 2000	December 16–18, 2007	600 (LV)	± 4.0%	46%	39%	–	15%

Hypothetical polling

Elizabeth Dole vs. Mike Easley

Poll source	Date(s) administered	Sample size	Margin of error	Elizabeth Dole (R)	Mike Easley (D)	Other	Undecided
Rasmussen Report	October 17, 2007	500 (LV)	± 4.5%	42%	50%	3% (Note: "Some other candidate" with 3%)	4%
Public Policy Polling (D)	January 22, 2007	501 (LV)	± 4.3%	41%	44%	–	15%

Elizabeth Dole vs. Brad Miller

Poll source	Date(s) administered	Sample size	Margin of error	Elizabeth Dole (R)	Brad Miller (D)	Undecided
Public Policy Polling (D)	April 11, 2007	556 (LV)	± 4.1%	44%	33%	22%

Elizabeth Dole vs. Jim Neal

Poll source	Date(s) administered	Sample size	Margin of error	Elizabeth Dole (R)	Jim Neal (D)	Other	Undecided
Research 2000	April 28–30, 2008	600 (LV)	± 4.0%	49%	39%	–	12%
Rasmussen Reports	April 10, 2008	500 (LV)	± 4.5%	51%	37%	3%	8%
Public Policy Polling (D)	February 18, 2008	686 (LV)	± 3.7%	50%	29%	–	20%
Research 2000	December 16–18, 2007	600 (LV)	± 4.0%	47%	37%	–	16%

== Results ==
2008 United States Senate election in North Carolina
Party	Candidate	Votes	%	±%
Democratic	Kay Hagan	2,249,311	52.65%	+7.7%
Republican	Elizabeth Dole (incumbent)	1,887,510	44.18%	−9.4%
Libertarian	Chris Cole	133,430	3.17%	+2.1%
Write-in		1,719	0.0%	0.0%
Total votes		4,271,970	100.00%	N/A
Democratic gain from Republican				

=== Counties that flipped from Democratic to Republican ===
- Perquimans (largest city: Hertford)
- Camden (largest city: Camden)

=== Counties that flipped from Republican to Democratic ===
- Franklin (largest city: Wake Forest)
- Montgomery (largest city: Troy)
- Nash (largest municipality: Rocky Mount)
- New Hanover (largest municipality: Wilmington)
- Watauga (largest municipality: Boone)
- Alamance (largest municipality: Burlington)
- Brunswick (largest municipality: Leland)
- Greene (largest municipality: Snow Hill)
- Lee (largest municipality: Sanford)
- Person (largest municipality: Roxboro)
- Rockingham (largest municipality: Eden)
- Pender (largest municipality: Hampstead)
- Sampson (largest municipality: Clinton)
- Washington (largest municipality: Plymouth)
- Guilford (largest city: Greensboro)
- Mecklenburg (largest city: Charlotte)
- Tyrrell (largest municipality: Columbia)
- Buncombe (largest town: Asheville)
- Forsyth (largest town: Winston-Salem)
- Pitt (largest town: Greenville)
- Wake (largest town: Raleigh)
- Wilson (largest town: Wilson)
- Lenoir (largest town: Kinston)

== Analysis ==
In the 2008 election, Dole lost by a wider-than-expected margin, taking only 44 percent of the vote to Hagan's 53 percent – the widest margin for a Senate race in North Carolina in 30 years, and the largest margin of defeat for an incumbent Senator in the 2008 cycle. This was the first time since 1966 that Democrats won this seat. It has been speculated that the outcry over the "Godless" ads contributed to Dole's loss. Hagan trounced Dole in the state's five largest counties – Mecklenburg, Wake, Guilford, Forsyth and Durham. Hagan also dominated most of the eastern portion of the state, which had been the backbone of Helms' past Senate victories. While Dole dominated the Charlotte suburbs and most of the heavily Republican Foothills region, it was not enough to save her seat.

== See also ==
- 2008 United States Senate elections

== Notes ==
Partisan clients
