= 1958 United States Senate special election in North Carolina =

1958 United States Senate election in North Carolina
- November 4, 1958
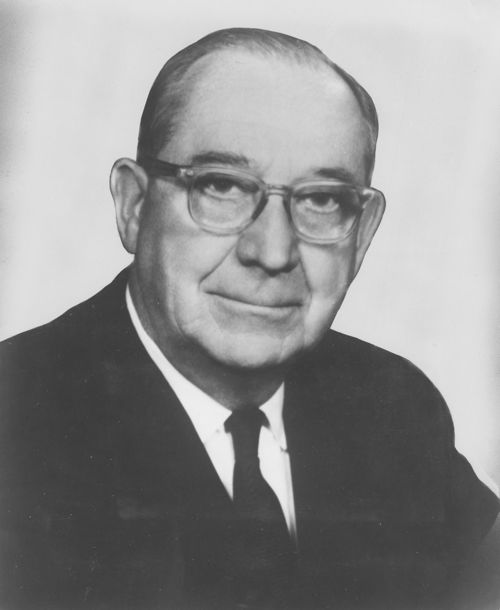

Nominee	B. Everett Jordan	Richard C. Clarke Jr.
Party	Democratic	Republican
Popular vote	431,492	184,977
Percentage	69.99%	30.01%
- County results Jordan: 50–60% 60–70% 70–80% 80–90% >90% Clarke: 50–60% 60–70% 70–80%
Senator before election
B. Everett Jordan
Democratic
Elected Senator
B. Everett Jordan
Democratic

The 1958 United States Senate special election in North Carolina was held on November 4, 1958. Interim Democratic Senator B. Everett Jordan was elected to complete the unexpired term of Senator W. Kerr Scott, who had died in April.

== Background ==
On April 16, 1958, Senator W. Kerr Scott died in office. On April 19, Governor of North Carolina Luther H. Hodges appointed B. Everett Jordan to fill the vacant seat until a successor could be duly elected. Although Scott and Jordan had been allies in Democratic Party politics, and Scott's wife was first cousins with Jordan, Jordan's selection to fill the seat was unexpected. A special election to finish Scott's term was scheduled for November 4, 1958, concurrent with the general election.

Jordan's appointment capped a twelve-year period during which eight different men (Note: J. William Bailey (1946), William B. Ulmstead (1946–1948), J. Melville Broughton (1948–1949), Frank Porter Graham (1949–1950), Willis Smith (1950–1953), Alton A. Lennon (1953–1954), W. Kerr Scott (1954–1958), and Jordan.) held this Senate seat. He was reelected in 1960 and 1966, but lost renomination in 1972.

== General election ==
=== Results ===
1958 U.S. Senate election in North Carolina
Party	Candidate	Votes	%	±%
Democratic	B. Everett Jordan (incumbent)	431,492	69.99%	▲4.09
Republican	Richard C. Clarke Jr.	184,977	30.01%	▼4.09
Total votes		616,469	100.00%	
