= 2026 United States Senate election in North Carolina =

- November 3, 2026

Nominee	Roy Cooper	Michael Whatley
Party	Democratic	Republican
Popular vote	2,480,638	1,648,864
Percentage	58.75%	39.05%
- Cooper: 40–50% 50–60% 60–70% 70–80% 80–90% Whatley: 40–50% 50–60% 60–70% 70–80%
U.S. senator before election
Thom Tillis
Republican
Elected U.S. senator
Roy Cooper
Democratic

The 2026 United States Senate election in North Carolina was held on November 3, 2026, to elect a member of the United States Senate to represent the state of North Carolina. Former Democratic governor Roy Cooper defeated former Republican party chair Michael Whatley in a landslide. Republican incumbent Thom Tillis did not seek a third term.

Considered vulnerable to a primary challenge due to his moderate positions, Tillis announced he would run for re-election, but withdrew after voting against the One Big Beautiful Bill Act. Whatley, who emerged as the Republican frontrunner after being endorsed by President Donald Trump, won the nomination with 64.6% of the vote over author Don Brown. Cooper won the Democratic nomination with 92% of the vote against minimal opposition.

Though initially anticipated to be a closely competitive race, Cooper's comfortable and consistent lead in the polls following his entrance and Tillis' withdrawal led this seat to be considered a likely pickup for Democrats. Subsequently, Republican donor groups pulled resources from Whatley for other races they considered more competitive. Cooper's victory marked the first time a Democrat had won a Senate election in North Carolina since 2008.

This was one of eight seats Democrats flipped in a state carried by Donald Trump in the 2024 presidential election and nine total Senate seats flipped by Democrats in 2026.

== Background ==
A swing state, North Carolina is considered to be a purple to slightly red Southern state at the federal level. It was also a top battleground state in the 2020 and 2024 presidential elections. The state backed Donald Trump in both elections by 1.3% and 3.2%, respectively.

Both parties have seen success in the state in recent years. Republicans control both chambers of the North Carolina General Assembly and hold a majority in North Carolina's U.S. House delegation, as well as both of the state's U.S. Senate seats. In 2024, Democrats won half of the state's executive offices, flipping a net of one seat from Republicans.

== Republican primary ==
Senator Thom Tillis was considered vulnerable to a primary challenger from his right. On June 10, 2023, the North Carolina Republican Party voted to censure Tillis for his support for the Respect for Marriage Act and immigration reform attempts. On June 28, 2025, President Donald Trump stated he was considering backing a primary challenger after Tillis voted against a motion to consider the One Big Beautiful Bill Act. The following day, Tillis announced that he would not seek re-election.

=== Candidates ===
==== Nominee ====
- Michael Whatley, former chair of the Republican National Committee (2024–2025)

==== Eliminated in primary ====
- Don Brown, attorney, author, and candidate for North Carolina's 8th congressional district in 2024
- Richard Dansie, IT security engineer
- Thomas Johnson, businessman
- Michele Morrow, former nurse and nominee for North Carolina superintendent of public instruction in 2024
- Elizabeth Temple, teacher and candidate for North Carolina's 28th House district in 2024

==== Withdrawn ====
- Brooks Agnew, author
- Andy Nilsson, retired business owner and high school football coach
- Thom Tillis, incumbent U.S. senator (2015–present)

==== Disqualified ====
- Margot Dupre, real estate broker (Note: Dupre still appeared on the primary ballot.)
- Lichia Sibhatu, daycare owner and candidate for U.S. Senate in 2022

==== Declined ====
- Pat Harrigan, U.S. representative from North Carolina's 10th congressional district (2025–present) (running for re-election)
- Richard Hudson, U.S. representative from North Carolina's 9th congressional district (2013–present) (running for re-election)
- Greg Murphy, U.S. representative from North Carolina's 3rd congressional district (2019–present) (running for re-election)
- Mark Robinson, former lieutenant governor of North Carolina (2021–2025) and nominee for governor in 2024 (endorsed Brown)
- Lara Trump, former co-chair of the Republican National Committee (2024–2025) and daughter-in-law of President Donald Trump (endorsed Whatley)
- Mark Walker, principal advisor on global religious freedom to the State Department, former U.S. representative from North Carolina's 6th congressional district (2015–2021), and candidate for U.S. Senate in 2022

=== Endorsements ===
Don Brown

Executive branch officials

- William Boykin, former deputy undersecretary of defense for intelligence and security (2002–2007)
- Michael Flynn, former national security advisor (2017)

U.S. representatives

- Allen West, former FL-22 (2011–2013)

Statewide officials

- Mark Robinson, former lieutenant governor of North Carolina (2021–2025)

Individuals

- Sidney Powell, attorney and former federal prosecutor
Michael Whatley

Executive branch officials

- Donald Trump, president of the United States (2017–2021, 2025–present)

U.S senators

- Tim Scott, South Carolina (2013–present)
- John Thune, Senate majority leader (2025–present) from South Dakota (2005–present)

Party officials

- Lara Trump, former co-chair of the Republican National Committee (2024–2025)

Organizations

- Americans for Prosperity
- National Republican Senatorial Committee
- Republican National Committee
- Turning Point Action

Newspapers

- The Charlotte Observer
- The News & Observer
Thom Tillis (withdrawn)

U.S. senators

- Jim Banks, Indiana (2025–present)
- John Barrasso, Wyoming (2007–present)
- John Boozman, Arkansas (2011–present)
- Shelley Moore Capito, West Virginia (2015–present)
- Bill Cassidy, Louisiana (2015–present)
- Tom Cotton, Arkansas (2015–present)
- Mike Crapo, Idaho (1999–present)
- Steve Daines, Montana (2015–present)
- Joni Ernst, Iowa (2015–present)
- Deb Fischer, Nebraska (2013–present)
- Chuck Grassley, Iowa (1981–present)
- James Lankford, Oklahoma (2015–present)
- Cynthia Lummis, Wyoming (2021–present)
- Markwayne Mullin, Oklahoma (2023–2026)
- Lisa Murkowski, Alaska (2002–present)
- Pete Ricketts, Nebraska (2023–present)
- Mike Rounds, South Dakota (2015–present)

Organizations

- AIPAC

=== Fundraising ===
Campaign finance reports as of March 31, 2026
Candidate	Raised	Spent	Cash on hand
Don Brown (R)	$224,689	$225,530	$0
Richard Dansie (R)	$2,410	$1,780	$630
Thomas Johnson (R)	$6,720	$4,627	$0
Michele Morrow (R)	$12,714	$12,036	$678
Michael Whatley (R)	$8,410,252	$5,881,909	$2,528,343
Source: Federal Election Commission

=== Polling ===
Poll source	Date(s) administered	Sample size (Note: Key: A – all adults RV – registered voters LV – likely voters V – unclear)	Margin of error	Don Brown	Michele Morrow	Michael Whatley	Other	Undecided
Harper Polling (R) (Note: Poll sponsored by The Carolina Journal)	February 22–23, 2026	600 (LV)	± 4.0%	8%	2%	38%	3% (Note: Dupre, Johnson, and Temple with 1%; Dansie with <1%)	50%
High Point University	February 6–20, 2026	— (LV)	± 6.0%	12%	2%	38%	13% (Note: Dansie with 5%; Dupre and Temple with 3%; Johnson with 2%)	35%
Change Research (D) (Note: Poll sponsored by Carolina Forward)	January 5–7, 2026	530 (LV)	—	6%	4%	36%	3% (Note: "Would not vote" with 3%)	51%

Hypothetical polling

Thom Tillis vs. Mark Robinson

Poll source	Date(s) administered	Sample size	Margin of error	Thom Tillis	Mark Robinson	Undecided
Campaign Viability Research (R)	November 13–15, 2024	800 (LV)	—	42%	35%	23%

Thom Tillis vs. "Someone Else"

Poll source	Date(s) administered	Sample size	Margin of error	Thom Tillis	Someone Else	Undecided
Campaign Viability Research (R)	November 13–15, 2024	800 (LV)	—	31%	36%	33%

Thom Tillis vs. Lara Trump

Poll source	Date(s) administered	Sample size	Margin of error	Thom Tillis	Lara Trump	Undecided
Victory Insights (R)	November 26–29, 2024	800 (LV)	—	11%	65%	25%

=== Results ===
Results by county Whatley: 40–50%; 50–60%; 60–70%; 70–80%

Results by precinct Whatley: 30–40%; 40–50%; 50–60%; 60–70%; 70–80%; 80–90%; >90%; Brown: 20–30%; 30–40%; 40–50%; 50–60%; 60–70%; >90%; Johnson: 30–40%; 40–50%; 50–60%; 60–70%; >90%; Morrow: 40–50%; 50–60%; 60–70%; 70–80%; Temple: 40–50%; >90%

Republican primary results
Party	Candidate	Votes	%
Republican	Michael Whatley	405,140	64.6
Republican	Don Brown	97,891	15.6
Republican	Thomas Johnson	35,534	5.7
Republican	Michele Morrow	35,065	5.6
Republican	Elizabeth Temple	23,892	3.8
Republican	Richard Dansie	14,996	2.4
Republican	Margot Dupre (disqualified)	14,886	2.4
Total votes		627,404	100.0

== Democratic primary ==
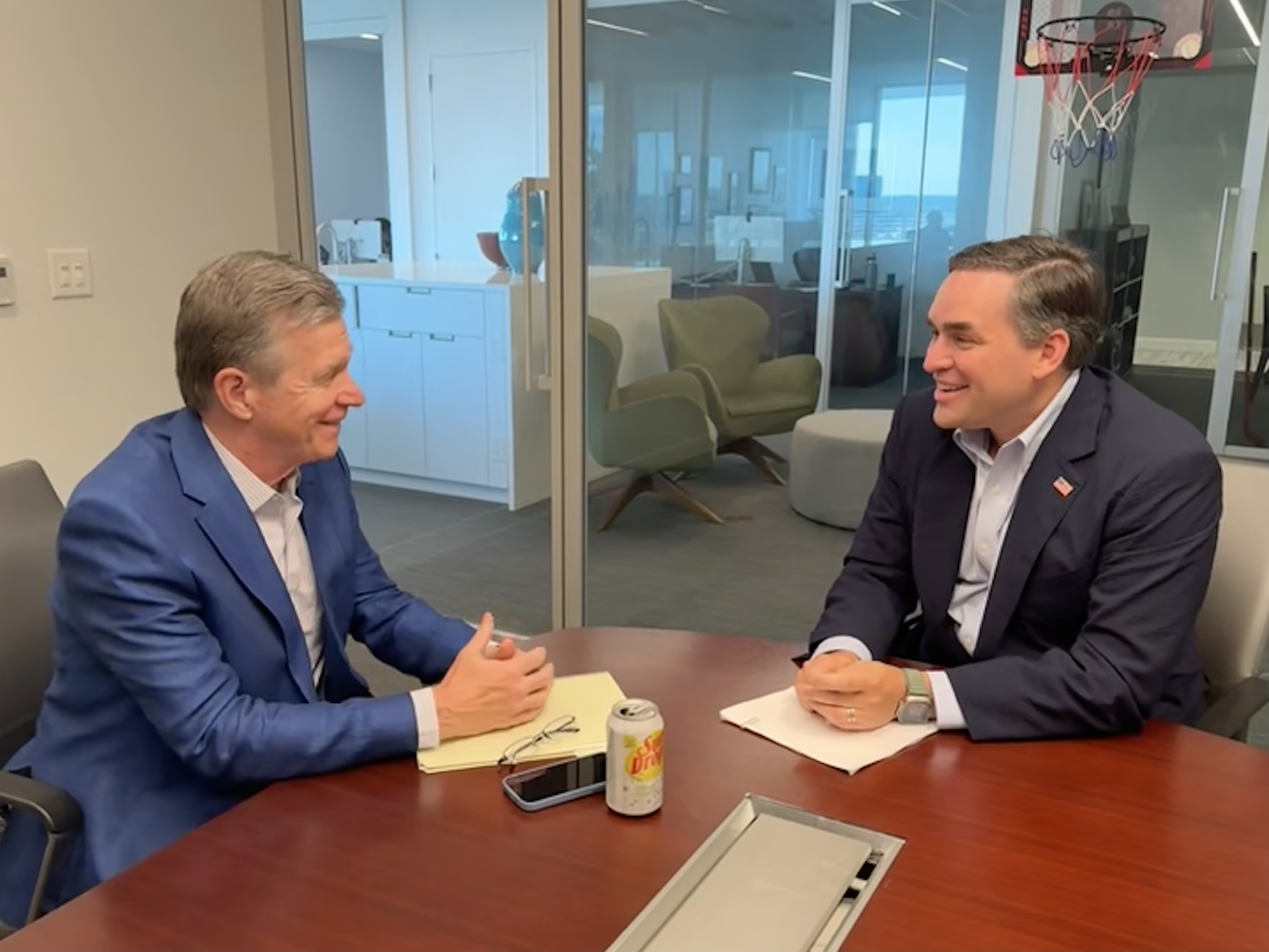
Wiley Nickel endorsing Roy Cooper for Senate

In 2025, Roy Cooper announced his candidacy for the United States Senate seat in the 2026 election. Shortly after his announcement, former U.S. Representative Wiley Nickel, who had previously entered the race, withdrew his candidacy and endorsed Cooper for the Democratic nomination. Nickel cited Cooper's executive experience and electoral strength as reasons for his endorsement.

=== Candidates ===
==== Nominee ====
- Roy Cooper, former governor of North Carolina (2017–2025)

==== Eliminated in primary ====
- Robert Colon, family caregiver and perennial candidate
- Justin Dues, tech consultant and nominee for North Carolina's 8th congressional district in 2024
- Daryl Farrow, businessman and nominee for North Carolina's 3rd congressional district in 2020
- Orrick Quick, pastor
- Marcus Williams, attorney and perennial candidate

==== Withdrawn ====
- Wiley Nickel, former U.S. representative from North Carolina's 13th congressional district (2023–2025) (endorsed Cooper, running for Wake County district attorney)

==== Disqualified ====
- Alyssia Hammond, hospitality worker and candidate for U.S. Senate in 2022

==== Declined ====
- Don Davis, U.S. representative from North Carolina's 1st congressional district (2023–present) (running for re-election)
- Jeff Jackson, attorney general of North Carolina (2025–present) (endorsed Cooper)
- Deborah Ross, U.S. representative from North Carolina's 2nd congressional district (2021–present) and nominee for U.S. Senate in 2016 (endorsed Cooper, running for re-election)

=== Endorsements ===
Roy Cooper

Executive branch officials

- Kamala Harris, former vice president of the United States (2021–2025)

U.S. senators

- Kirsten Gillibrand, New York (2009–present)
- Chuck Schumer, Senate minority leader (2017–2021, 2025–present) from New York (1999–present)

U.S. representatives

- Wiley Nickel, former NC-13 (2023–2025)
- Deborah Ross, NC-02 (2021–present) and nominee for U.S. Senate in 2016

Statewide officials

- Jeff Jackson, attorney general of North Carolina (2025–present)
- Josh Stein, governor of North Carolina (2025–present)

Local officials

- Zeb Smathers, mayor of Canton (2017–present)

Party officials

- Anderson Clayton, chair of the North Carolina Democratic Party (2023–present)

Labor unions

- American Federation of Government Employees
- National Education Association
- North Carolina Association of Educators

Organizations

- Democratic Majority for Israel
- End Citizens United
- Giffords
- Jewish Democratic Council of America
- League of Conservation Voters
- Planned Parenthood Action Fund
- Red Wine & Blue
- Reproductive Freedom for All
- Sierra Club

=== Fundraising ===
Campaign finance reports as of March 31, 2026
Candidate	Raised	Spent	Cash on hand
Roy Cooper (D)	$26,822,373	$8,366,910	$18,455,463
Marcus Williams (D)	$5,656	$5,656	$0
Source: Federal Election Commission

=== Polling ===
Poll source	Date(s) administered	Sample size	Margin of error	Robert Colon	Roy Cooper	Justin Dues	Daryl Farrow	Marcus Williams	Other	Undecided
High Point University	February 6–20, 2026	— (LV)	± 6.0%	3%	78%	3%	2%	2%	0% (Note: Orrick Quick with 0%)	14%

=== Results ===
Results by county Cooper: 80–90%; >90%

Results by precinct Cooper: 30–40%; 50–60%; 60–70%; 70–80%; 80–90%; >90%; Farrow: 50–60%

Democratic primary results
Party	Candidate	Votes	%
Democratic	Roy Cooper	761,345	92.0
Democratic	Justin Dues	22,295	2.7
Democratic	Marcus Williams	20,336	2.5
Democratic	Daryl Farrow	9,727	1.2
Democratic	Orrick Quick	7,275	0.9
Democratic	Robert Colon	6,777	0.8
Total votes		827,755	100.0

== Libertarian primary ==
=== Candidates ===
==== Nominee ====
- Shannon Bray, cybersecurity professional and perennial candidate

== Green primary ==
=== Candidates ===
==== Nominee ====
- Michael Dublin, teacher and nominee for North Carolina's 2nd congressional district in 2024

==== Withdrew ====
- Brian McGinnis, anti-war activist, Marine veteran, and firefighter (running for congress in North Carolina's 2nd congressional district as a write-in candidate)

=== Fundraising ===
Campaign finance reports as of March 31, 2026
Candidate	Raised	Spent	Cash on hand
Michael Dublin (G)	$23,377	$4,245	$20,873
Source: Federal Election Commission

== Independents ==
=== Candidates ===
==== Disqualified ====
- Lee Brian
- Shaunesi DeBerry, social media personality
- Yuhong Dong
- Travis Herlocker
- Connie Johnson, pastor and perennial candidate (Democratic Party of Federalists)
- Michele Palmer Parks (write-in)
- Geoffrey Shull

== General election ==
=== Campaign ===
The Senate Leadership Fund—first reported by Semafor in October 2026—canceled a pledged $30 million in expenditures from Whatley's campaign to redirect support for Senator Roger Marshall's 2026 re-election campaign in Kansas. Since 2025, the political action committee has spent $71 million on advertisements, largely focusing on crime and public safety.

=== Predictions ===
Source	Ranking	As of
CBS News	Lean D (flip)	October 30, 2026
The Cook Political Report	Likely D (flip)	November 2, 2026
Decision Desk HQ	Likely D (flip)	November 3, 2026
The Economist (Note: The Economist's prediction model uses unconventional terminology. For the purpose of equivalency, their "Very Likely" ratings are formatted as a "Likely" rating while "Likely" ratings are formatted as a "Lean" rating.)	Likely D (flip)	November 3, 2026
FiftyPlusOne	Safe D (flip)	November 3, 2026
Fox News	Likely D (flip)	November 1, 2026
Inside Elections	Lean D (flip)	October 29, 2026
MS NOW	Lean D (flip)	October 29, 2026
NBC News	Likely D (flip)	November 3, 2026
RealClearPolitics	Likely D (flip)	November 2, 2026
Sabato's Crystal Ball	Likely D (flip)	November 2, 2026
Silver Bulletin	Solid D (flip)	November 3, 2026
Split Ticket	Safe D (flip)	November 2, 2026

=== Post-primary endorsements ===
Michael Whatley (R)

Executive branch officials

- JD Vance, vice president of the United States (2025–present)

U.S. senators

- Ted Budd, North Carolina (2023–present)
- Norm Coleman, former Senator for Minnesota (2003–2009)
- Thom Tillis, North Carolina (2015–present)

Statewide officials

- Steve Troxler, agriculture commissioner of North Carolina (2005–present)

State legislators

- Buck Newton, SD-04 (2023–present)
- Brad Overcash, SD-43 (2023–present)
- Benton Sawrey, SD-10 (2023–present)
- Paul Scott, HD-111 (2025–present)

Local officials

- Samuel Page, sheriff of Rockingham County (1998–present)

Labor unions

- National Border Patrol Council
- North Carolina Police Benevolent Association

Organizations

- Conservative Political Action Conference
- National Right to Life Committee
- NRA Political Victory Fund
- Republican Jewish Coalition
- Republican National Hispanic Assembly
- Susan B. Anthony Pro-Life America
- Tea Party Patriots Citizens Fund
- U.S. Chamber of Commerce
Roy Cooper (D)

Executive branch officials

- Barack Obama, former president of the United States (2009–2017)

U.S. senators

- Angela Alsobrooks, Maryland (2025–present)

Statewide officials

- Wes Moore, governor of Maryland (2023–present)
- Gavin Newsom, governor of California (2019–present)

Labor unions

- North Carolina AFL-CIO
- United Auto Workers

Organizations

- Human Rights Campaign PAC
- J Street
- MoveOn
- National Committee to Preserve Social Security and Medicare

=== Fundraising ===
Campaign finance reports as of October 14, 2026
Candidate	Raised	Spent	Cash on hand
Roy Cooper (D)	$49,585,341	$40,496,482	$9,088,860
Michael Whatley (R)	$13,668,468	$12,766,229	$902,238
Michael Dublin (G)	$28,231	$26,976	$2,996
Shannon Bray (L)	$0	$0	$0
Source: Federal Election Commission

=== Polling ===
Aggregate polls

Source of poll aggregation	Dates administered	Dates updated	Michael Whatley (R)	Roy Cooper (D)	Other/Undecided (Note: Calculated by taking the difference of 100% and all other candidates combined.)	Margin
270toWin	October 1 – November 1, 2026	November 3, 2026	42.8%	54.2%	3.0%	Cooper +11.4%
Decision Desk HQ	through November 1, 2026	November 3, 2026	43.1%	54.1%	2.8%	Cooper +11.0%
FiftyPlusOne	through November 1, 2026	November 3, 2026	42.5%	54.1%	3.4%	Cooper +11.6%
RealClearPolitics	October 1 – November 1, 2026	November 2, 2026	41.8%	52.8%	5.4%	Cooper +11.0%
Silver Bulletin	through November 1, 2026	November 3, 2026	42.6%	53.7%	3.6%	Cooper +11.0%
Average			42.6%	53.8%	3.6%	Cooper +11.2%

Poll source	Date(s) administered	Sample size	Margin of error	Michael Whatley (R)	Roy Cooper (D)	Other	Undecided
AtlasIntel	October 28 – November 1, 2026	1,459 (LV)	± 3.0%	42%	56%	1% (Note: "Other" with 1%; "Would not vote" with <1%)	0%
East Carolina University	October 26–29, 2026	1,041 (LV)	± 3.5%	45%	54%	1% (Note: Shannon Bray (L) with 1%; Michael Dublin (G) with <1%)	—
YouGov	October 26–29, 2026	2,130 (LV)	± 2.9%	44%	55%	1%	1%
Quantus Insights (R)	October 24–25, 2026	722 (LV)	± 4.0%	43%	51%	2% (Note: Shannon Bray (L) & Michael Dublin (G) with 1%; "Someone else" with 0%)	3%
Quantus Insights (R)	October 24–25, 2026	722 (LV)	± 4.0%	43%	52% (Note: With voters who lean towards a given candidate)	2%	2%
Quantus Insights (R)	October 24–25, 2026	702 (LV)	± 4.0%	44%	53%	—	3%
Quantus Insights (R)	October 24–25, 2026	702 (LV)	± 4.0%	45%	54%	—	2%
RedBox Research (D)	October 20–23, 2026	3,292 (LV)	± 3.7%	43%	50%	4% (Note: "Prefer not to answer" with 2%; Shannon Bray (L) with 1%; "Someone else" with 1%; Michael Dublin (G) with 0%; "Did not vote in this race" with 0%)	3%
Harper Polling (R)	October 18–20, 2026	600 (LV)	± 4.0%	39%	49%	5% (Note: Shannon Bray (L) with 3%; Michael Dublin (G) with 2%)	7%
Harper Polling (R)	October 18–20, 2026	600 (LV)	± 4.0%	42%	52%	—	7%
ActiVote	October 8–20, 2026	400 (LV)	± 4.9%	43%	57%	—	—
High Point University/YouGov	October 1–20, 2026	620 (LV)	± 4.7%	40%	54%	3% (Note: Shannon Bray (L) with 2%; Michael Dublin (G) with 1%)	6%
SurveyUSA (Note: Poll sponsored by WRAL-TV and WSOC-TV)	October 7–11, 2026	643 (LV)	± 5.0%	40%	54%	1% (Note: "Another candidate" with 1%)	5%
Trafalgar Group (R)	October 8–10, 2026	1,091 (LV)	± 2.9%	41%	49%	3% (Note: Michael Dublin (G) with 2%; Shannon Bray (L) with 1%)	7%
Change Research (D)	October 1–7, 2026	829 (LV)	± 3.7%	40%	50%	—	10%
Elon University/YouGov	September 29 – October 8, 2026	561 (LV)	± 4.9%	39%	52%	3%	6%
East Carolina University	September 30 – October 3, 2026	810 (LV)	± 4.0%	43%	50%	2%	6%
East Carolina University	September 30 – October 3, 2026	810 (LV)	± 4.0%	46%	53%	2% (Note: Shannon Bray (L) with 2%; Michael Dublin (G) & "A write-in candidate" with 0%)	–
Big Data Poll	September 27–29, 2026	642 (LV)	± 4.0%	35%	47%	5% (Note: Shannon Bray (L) with 3%; Michael Dublin (G) with 2%)	12%
Big Data Poll	September 27–29, 2026	642 (LV)	± 4.0%	39%	51%	11% (Note: Shannon Bray (L) with 7%; Michael Dublin (G) with 4%)	–
Big Data Poll	September 27–29, 2026	698 (RV)	± 4.0%	34%	45%	5%	15%
Big Data Poll	September 27–29, 2026	698 (RV)	± 4.0%	38%	49%	13% (Note: Shannon Bray (L) with 7%; Michael Dublin (G) with 6%)	–
Quantus Insights (R)	September 21–22, 2026	686 (LV)	± 4.2%	43%	48%	5% (Note: "Would not vote" with 3%; "A minor candidate or someone else" with 2%)	4%
Fabrizio Ward (R)/ Impact Research (D) (Note: Poll commissioned by AARP)	September 17–20, 2026	1,806 (LV)	± 2.9%	42%	53%	—	5%
Opinion Diagnostics (Note: Poll sponsored by Common Cause North Carolina)	September 17–20, 2026	857 (LV)	± 3.3%	41%	51%	2% (Note: "Another candidate" with 2%)	5%
Opinion Diagnostics	September 17–20, 2026	857 (LV)	± 3.3%	44%	52%	–	3%
YouGov	September 15–18, 2026	3,864 (RV)	± 2.5%	41%	52%	2% (Note: "Someone else" & "I will not vote in this race" with 1%)	5%
YouGov	September 15–18, 2026	3,742 (LV) (Note: Loose likely voters.)	± 2.6%	41%	53%	1% (Note: "Someone else" with 1%)	4%
YouGov	September 15–18, 2026	3,511 (LV) (Note: Strict likely voters.)	± 2.6%	41%	54%	1% (Note: "Someone else" with 1%)	4%
InsiderAdvantage (R)	September 16–17, 2026	1,200 (LV)	± 4.0%	43%	48%	3%	6%
High Point University	September 9–16, 2026	813 (RV)	± 3.8%	39%	49%	4% (Note: "Another candidate" with 4%)	8%
High Point University	September 9–16, 2026	706 (LV)	± 3.9%	42%	50%	3% (Note: "Another candidate" with 1%)	5%
Harper Polling (R)	September 13–15, 2026	608 (LV)	± 4.0%	34%	49%	5% (Note: Shannon Bray (L) with 3%; Michael Dublin (G) with 2%)	12%
Catawba College/YouGov	September 4–15, 2026	885 (LV)	–	35%	47%	5% (Note: Shannon Bray (L) with 5%; "Another candidate" with 1%)	13%
Catawba College/YouGov	September 4–15, 2026	885 (LV)	–	37%	48%	5% (Note: "3rd party candidate" with 5%)	10%
The Trafalgar Group (R)	September 8–10, 2026	1,084 (LV)	± 2.9%	42%	48%	3% (Note: Shannon Bray (L) with 1%; Michael Dublin (G) with 1%)	7%
East Carolina University	August 31 – September 3, 2026	675 (LV)	± 4.4%	39%	46%	3% (Note: Shannon Bray (L), Michael Dublin (G), and write-in with 1%)	14%
East Carolina University	August 31 – September 3, 2026	675 (LV)	± 4.4%	44% (Note: On a forced-choice measure without an undecided option)	52%	5% (Note: Shannon Bray (L) with 3%; Michael Dublin (G) and write-in with 1%)	–
Elon University/YouGov	August 21–31, 2026	565 (LV)	± 5.6%	38%	49%	4% (Note: Shannon Bray (L) with 2%; Michael Dublin (G) with 2%)	8%
Elon University/YouGov	August 21–31, 2026	677 (RV)	± 5.1%	36%	49%	5% (Note: "Do not plan to vote" and Michael Dublin (G) with 2%; Shannon Bray (L) with 1%)	11%
Elon University/YouGov	August 21–31, 2026	800 (A)	± 5.1%	29%	39%	20% (Note: "Do not plan to vote" with 17%; Shannon Bray (L) with 2%; Michael Dublin (G) with 1%)	12%
High Point University/YouGov	August 3–12, 2026	800 (RV)	± 4.2%	41%	48%	4% (Note: "Someone else" with 4%)	8%
High Point University/YouGov	August 3–12, 2026	660 (LV)	± 3.8%	45%	50%	3% (Note: "Someone else" with 3%)	3%
Harper Polling (R)	August 9–10, 2026	600 (LV)	± 4.0%	39%	52%	5% (Note: "Someone else" with 5%)	5%
Change Research (D)	August 3–6, 2026	915 (LV)	± 3.5%	43%	50%	—	7%
Change Research (D)	July 29 – August 1, 2026	967 (V)	± 3.4%	41%	50%	—	9%
Elon University/YouGov	July 23–31, 2026	466 (LV)	± 5.6%	42%	53%	3%	2%
Elon University/YouGov	July 23–31, 2026	717 (RV)	± 4.4%	35%	51%	7% (Note: "Do not plan to vote" with 3%; Michael Dublin (G) with 2%; Shannon Bray (L) and "Someone else" with 1%)	7%
Elon University/YouGov	July 23–31, 2026	800 (A)	± 4.2%	33%	47%	11% (Note: "Do not plan to vote" with 8%; Shannon Bray (L) with 2%; Michael Dublin (G) and "Someone else" with 1%)	9%
Beacon Research (D)/ Shaw & Co. Research (R) (Note: Poll conducted for Fox News)	July 23–27, 2026	1,005 (RV)	± 3.0%	44%	53%	—	3%
Public Policy Polling (D)	July 10–11, 2026	759 (LV)	± 3.6%	44%	48%	—	8%
New York Times/Siena University	June 15–27, 2026	601 (LV)	± 4.7%	43%	50%	—	6%
Catawba College/YouGov	June 1–10, 2026	905 (LV)	± 3.8%	34%	48%	—	18%
Harper Polling (R)	May 10–11, 2026	600 (LV)	± 4.0%	39%	50%	—	11%
Change Research (D)	May 4–8, 2026	957 (LV)	± 3.3%	42%	49%	—	9%
Opinion Diagnostics (R)	April 21–24, 2026	830 (V)	± 3.5%	41%	50%	—	9%
High Point University/YouGov	March 26 – April 6, 2026	703 (LV)	± 4.3%	42%	50%	2% (Note: "Someone else/another party" with 2%)	6%
High Point University/YouGov	March 26 – April 6, 2026	800 (RV)	± 4.1%	39%	49%	3% (Note: "Someone else/another party" with 3%)	9%
Quantus Insights (R)	March 31 – April 1, 2026	987 (LV)	± 3.5%	44%	49%	2%	6%
Harper Polling (R)	March 22–23, 2026	600 (LV)	± 4.0%	41%	49%	4%	6%
Catawba College/YouGov	March 9–18, 2026	1,000 (LV)	± 3.6%	34%	48%	4% (Note: Shannon Bray (L) with 4%; "Other candidate" with 0%)	14%
Public Policy Polling (D)	March 13–14, 2026	556 (V)	± 4.2%	44%	47%	—	9%
Nexus Strategies/ Strategic Partners Solutions (Note: Poll sponsored by Healthier United)	March 8–9, 2026	800 (RV)	± 3.5%	32%	50%	4% (Note: Shannon Bray (L) with 4%.)	14%
	March 3, 2026	Primary elections					
Change Research (D)	January 31–February 4, 2026	1,069 (RV)	± 3.1%	40%	50%	4% (Note: "Would not vote" with 4%)	7%
TIPP Insights (R) (Note: Poll sponsored by the League of American Workers)	January 12–15, 2026	1,512 (RV)	± 2.7%	24%	48%	—	27%
Change Research (D)	January 5–7, 2026	1,105 (LV)	± 3.5%	42%	47%	1% (Note: "Would not vote" with 1%)	9%
Harper Polling (R)	November 9–10, 2025	600 (LV)	± 4.0%	39%	47%	4%	10%
Harper Polling (R)	September 14–15, 2025	600 (RV)	± 4.0%	42%	46%	4%	8%
Change Research (D)	September 2–8, 2025	855 (LV)	± 3.6%	41%	48%	—	11%
Harper Polling (R)	August 11–12, 2025	600 (RV)	± 4.0%	39%	47%	4%	10%
Emerson College	July 28–30, 2025	1,000 (RV)	± 3.0%	41%	47%	—	12%
Victory Insights (R)	July 28–30, 2025	600 (LV)	—	40%	43%	—	16%
Victory Insights (R)	July 28–30, 2025	600 (LV)	—	44%	44%	—	12%

Hypothetical polling

Don Brown vs. Roy Cooper

Poll source	Date(s) administered	Sample size	Margin of error	Don Brown (R)	Roy Cooper (D)	Other	Undecided
Harper Polling (R)	November 9–10, 2025	600 (LV)	± 4.0%	38%	48%	4%	10%

Thom Tillis vs. Roy Cooper

Poll source	Date(s) administered	Sample size	Margin of error	Thom Tillis (R)	Roy Cooper (D)	Other	Undecided
Change Research (D)	March 31–April 4, 2025	867 (LV)	± 3.6%	44%	46%	—	10%
Change Research (D)	March 31–April 4, 2025	867 (LV)	± 3.6%	45%	48%	2% (Note: "Would not vote" with 2%)	5%
Public Policy Polling (D)	March 4–5, 2025	662 (V)	± 3.8%	43%	47%	—	9%
Victory Insights (R)	November 26–29, 2024	800 (LV)	—	44%	45%	—	11%

Lara Trump vs. Roy Cooper

Poll source	Date(s) administered	Sample size	Margin of error	Lara Trump (R)	Roy Cooper (D)	Other	Undecided
Victory Insights (R)	November 26–29, 2024	800 (LV)	—	44%	46%	—	10%

=== Results ===
2026 United States Senate election in North Carolina
Party	Candidate	Votes	%	±%
Democratic	Roy Cooper	2,480,638	58.75	+11.81%
Republican	Michael Whatley	1,648,864	39.05	−9.64%
Libertarian	Shannon W. Bray	56,084	1.33	−1.8%
Green	Michael Dublin	36,710	0.87	N/A
Total votes		4,222,296	100.0	
Democratic gain from Republican				

Counties that flipped from Republican to Democratic

- Alamance (largest municipality: Burlington)
- Anson (largest municipality: Wadesboro)
- Cabarrus (largest municipality: Concord)
- Franklin (largest municipality: Louisburg)
- Gaston (largest municipality: Gastonia)
- Granville (largest municipality: Oxford)
- Greene (largest municipality: Snow Hill)
- Harnett (largest municipality: Anderson Creek)
- Haywood (largest municipality: Waynesville)
- Henderson (largest municipality: Hendersonville)
- Jackson (largest municipality: Cullowhee)
- Johnston (largest municipality: Clayton)
- Lee (largest municipality: Sanford)
- Lenoir (largest municipality: Kinston)
- Madison (largest municipality: Mars Hill)
- Martin (largest municipality: Williamston)
- Pasquotank (largest municipality: Elizabeth City)
- Richmond (largest municipality: Rockingham)
- Scotland (largest municipality: Laurinburg)
- Transylvania (largest municipality: Brevard)

==== By congressional district ====
Cooper won all 14 congressional districts, including 3 won by Republicans.

District	Cooper	Whatley	Representative
1st	51%	47%	Don Davis
2nd	76%	22%	Deborah K. Ross
3rd	52%	45%	Greg Murphy
3rd	52%	45%	Raymond Smith Jr.
4th	81%	17%	Valerie Foushee
5th	52%	46%	Virginia Foxx
5th	52%	46%	Chuck Hubbard
6th	54%	44%	Addison McDowell
6th	54%	44%	Cyril Jefferson
7th	52%	45%	David Rouzer
8th	50%	48%	Mark Harris
9th	52%	46%	Richard Hudson
9th	52%	46%	Richard Ojeda
10th	51%	46%	Pat Harrigan
11th	56%	42%	Chuck Edwards
11th	56%	42%	Jamie Ager
12th	82%	16%	Alma Adams
13th	52%	45%	Brad Knott
13th	52%	45%	Paul Barringer
14th	54%	44%	Tim Moore
14th	54%	44%	Lakesha Womack

== Analysis ==
The election was not close, with Cooper defeating Whatley by a decisive 19.7% margin. Cooper won every congressional district, as well as all income levels, age groups, and educational attainment levels except for White voters who never attended college. He flipped 20 counties won by Thom Tillis in 2020.

Cooper won overwhelmingly in the state's major metropolitan regions. In the Research Triangle, he significantly outperformed Kamala Harris in 2024 in the counties of Orange, Durham, Chatham, and Wake, the state's most populous county. Cooper managed to win every bordering county, including traditionally Republican strongholds such as Harnett and Johnston counties. He won the state's second-largest county Mecklenburg, home to Charlotte, by a greater than 3-to-1 margin and cut deep into its surrounding suburbs, where Republicans typically dominate. Cooper flipped Cabarrus County, Gaston County, and lost Union County by under three points, with the latter two having voted for Donald Trump by over 20 points in 2024. Republican turnout saw a significant decline from 2024 in this race. Whatley earned 1.25 million fewer votes than Trump, representing a roughly 43% drop in support. Wake and Mecklenburg saw the largest drops, with about 100,000 and 90,000 fewer GOP voters, respectively.

=== Exit poll ===
2026 United States Senate election in North Carolina (CNN)
Demographic subgroup	Cooper	Whatley	% of total vote
Ideology
Liberals	99	1	25
Moderates	76	21	38
Conservatives	14	84	37
Party
Democrats	98	1	34
Republicans	10	89	31
Independents	63	32	35
Donald Trump job approval
Approve	6	92	37
Disapprove	91	7	62
2024 presidential vote
Kamala Harris	99	1	49
Donald Trump	10	87	43
Another candidate	79	11	2
Did not vote	81	14	4
Gender
Men	52	45	45
Women	64	34	54
Income
$100,000 or more	59	39	38
$50,000-$99,999	56	42	31
Less than $50,000	61	36	30
Race/ethnicity
White	50	48	73
Latino	70	26	4
Black	92	6	17
White born-again or evangelical Christian?
Yes	21	78	27
No	72	25	73
Race by gender
White men	44	54	34
White women	55	43	39
Black men	89	10	7
Black women	95	3	10
Latino men	70	26	2
Latino women	71	25	2
All other voters	64	32	7
Age
18–29 years old	79	18	11
30–44 years old	70	28	19
45–64 years old	52	46	35
65 and older	53	46	35
Area type
Urban	75	22	14
Suburban	65	33	38
Rural	48	49	48
Education
College graduate	68	31	46
No college degree	51	46	54
Education by race
White college graduates	63	36	35
Non-white college graduates	83	16	11
Whites without college	39	58	39
Non-whites without college	81	15	16
Education by gender and race
White women with college degrees	68	31	19
White women without college degrees	43	54	20
White men with college degrees	56	42	16
White men without college degrees	34	63	18
Voters of color	82	15	27
Educational attainment
Advanced degree	74	25	20
Bachelor's degree	63	36	25
Associate's degree	55	42	14
Some college	52	44	19
Never attended college	47	50	22

== Notes ==
Partisan clients
