= Judge Bryan =

Judge Bryan may refer to:

- Albert Vickers Bryan (1899–1984), judge of the United States Court of Appeals for the Fourth Circuit
- Albert Vickers Bryan Jr. (1926–2019), judge of the United States District Court for the Eastern District of Virginia
- Frederick van Pelt Bryan (1904–1978), judge of the United States District Court for the Southern District of New York
- George Seabrook Bryan (1809–1905), judge of the United States District Court for the District of South Carolina
- Jeffrey Bryan (born 1976), judge of the United States District Court for the District of Minnesota
- Nathan P. Bryan (1872–1935), judge of the United States Court of Appeals for the Fifth Circuit
- Robert Jensen Bryan (born 1934), judge of the United States District Court for the Western District of Washington

== See also ==
- Justice Bryan (disambiguation)
- Judge Bryant (disambiguation)
