= Jeter C. Pritchard =

American judge (1857–1921)

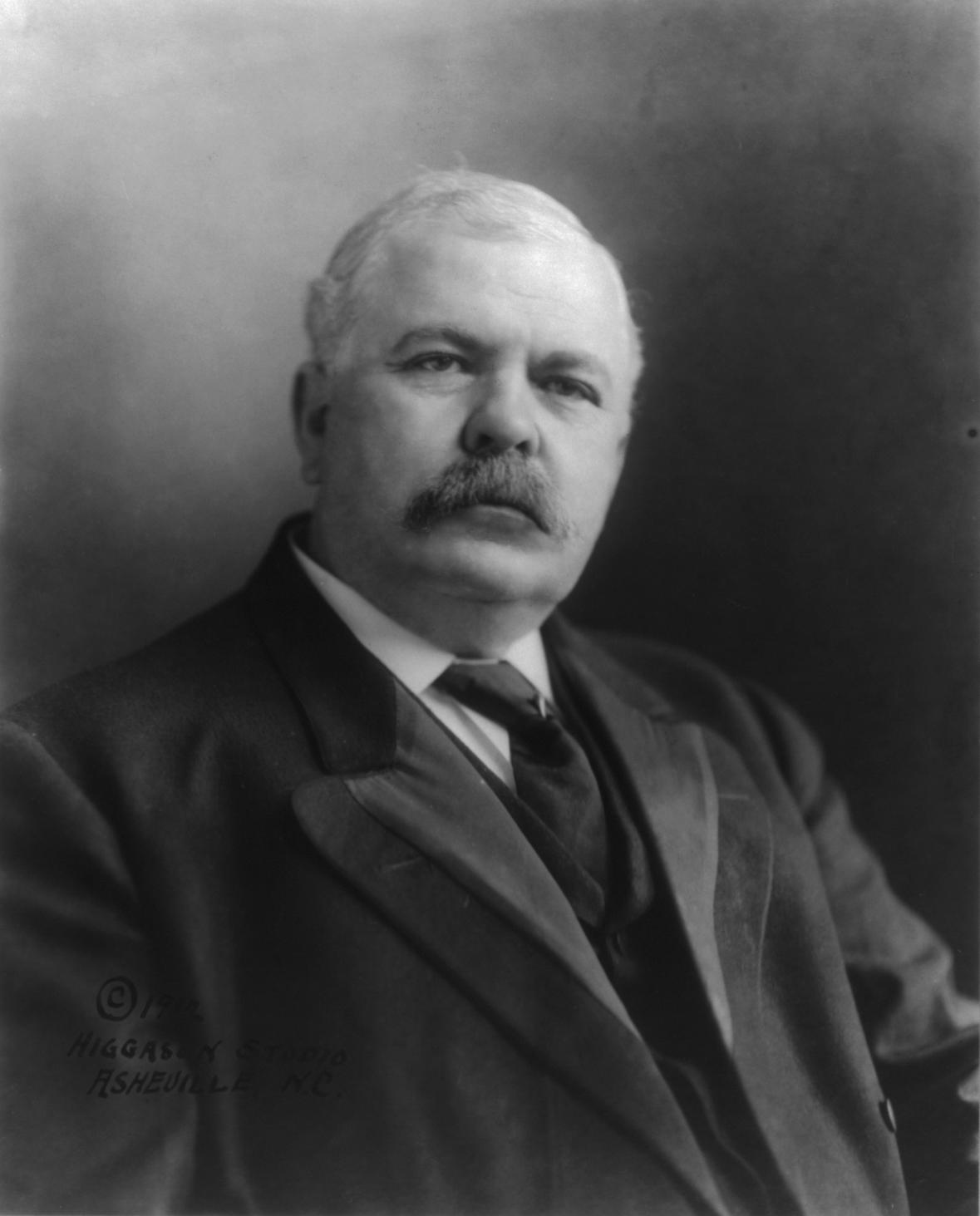

Judge of the United States Court of Appeals for the Fourth Circuit
- In office April 27, 1904 – April 10, 1921
- Appointed by: Theodore Roosevelt
- Preceded by: Charles Henry Simonton
- Succeeded by: Edmund Waddill Jr.

Judge of the United States Circuit Courts for the Fourth Circuit
- In office April 27, 1904 – December 31, 1911
- Appointed by: Theodore Roosevelt
- Preceded by: Charles Henry Simonton
- Succeeded by: Seat abolished

Associate Justice of the Supreme Court of the District of Columbia
- In office November 16, 1903 – June 1, 1904
- Appointed by: Theodore Roosevelt
- Preceded by: Harry M. Clabaugh
- Succeeded by: Wendell Phillips Stafford

United States Senator from North Carolina
- In office January 23, 1895 – March 3, 1903
- Preceded by: Thomas Jordan Jarvis
- Succeeded by: Lee Slater Overman

Member of the North Carolina House of Representatives from Madison County
- In office 1891–1893
- Preceded by: D. F. Lawson
- Succeeded by: Charles B. Mashburn
- In office 1885–1889
- Preceded by: D. S. Ball
- Succeeded by: D. F. Lawson

Personal details
- Born: Jeter Connelly Pritchard; July 12, 1857 Jonesboro, Tennessee
- Died: April 10, 1921 (aged 63) Asheville, North Carolina
- Resting place: Riverside Cemetery; Asheville, North Carolina
- Party: Republican
- Children: George M. Pritchard
- Occupation: Attorney
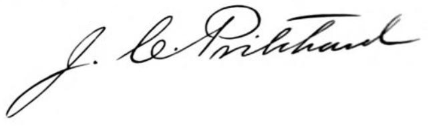
- Signature

Jeter Connelly Pritchard (July 12, 1857 – April 10, 1921) was a lawyer, newspaperman, United States Senator and a United States circuit judge of the United States Court of Appeals for the Fourth Circuit and of the United States Circuit Courts for the Fourth Circuit and previously was an associate justice of the Supreme Court of the District of Columbia. Earlier in his political career he served in the North Carolina House of Representatives. He was a Republican who was part of the populist fusion political wave before later opposing civil rights for African Americans.

== Early life and education ==
Born on July 12, 1857, in Jonesboro, Washington County, Tennessee, He attended the Martins Creek Academy in Tennessee.

== Career ==
Pritchard was apprenticed to the printer's trade, then moved to Bakersville, Mitchell County, North Carolina, in 1873. He became joint editor and owner of the Roan Mountain Republican. He was a Presidential Elector on the Republican Party ticket in North Carolina in 1880.

He read law and was admitted to the bar in 1889. He entered private practice in Marshall, North Carolina, starting in 1889.

== Political career ==
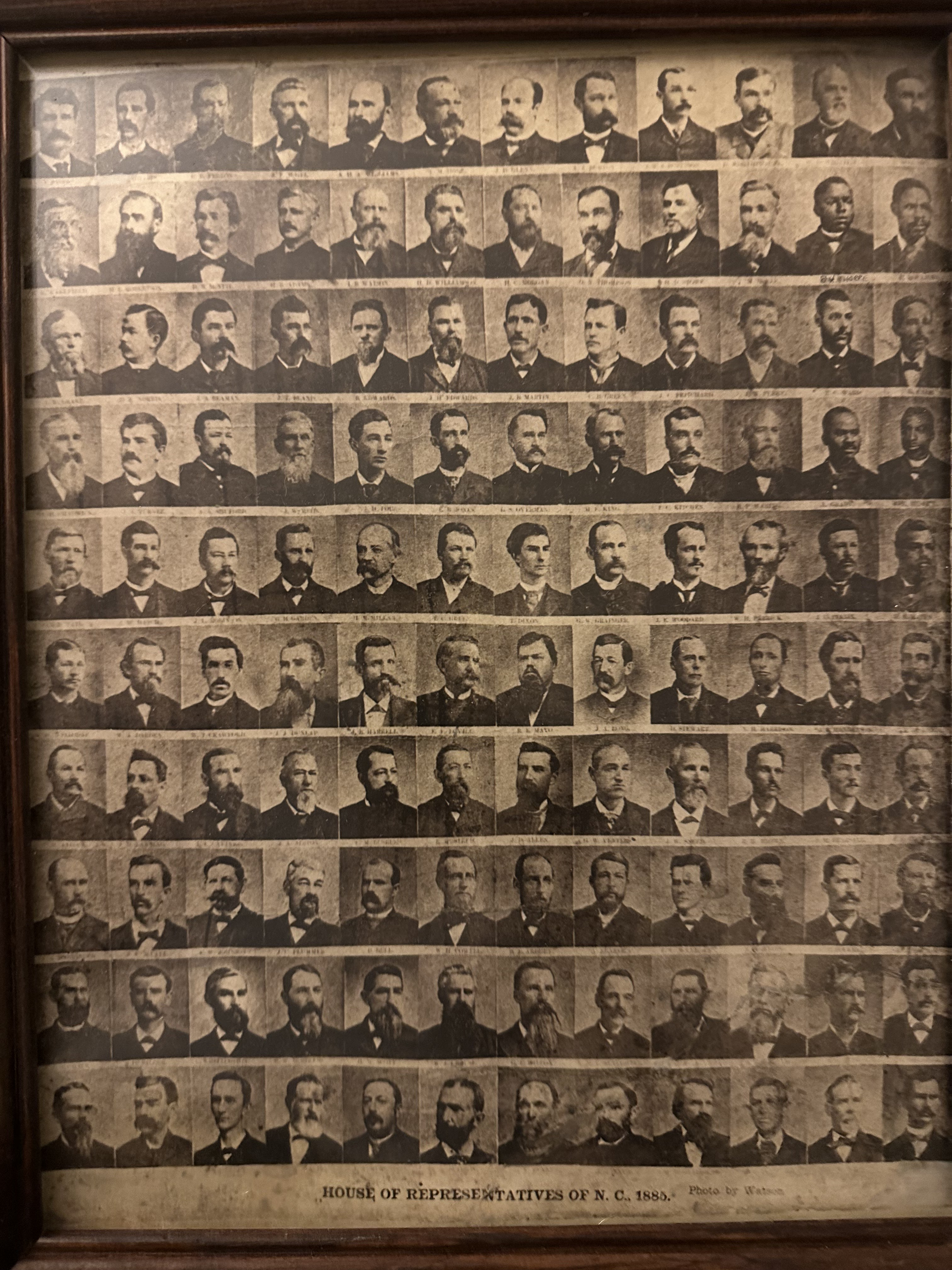
Members of the North Carolina House of Representatives in 1885

He was a member of the North Carolina House of Representatives from 1885 to 1889, and from 1891 to 1893. He was an unsuccessful candidate for Lieutenant Governor in 1888 and an unsuccessful candidate for United States Senator in 1891. He was President of the North Carolina Protective Tariff League in 1891. He was an unsuccessful candidate for election to the United States House of Representatives of the 53rd United States Congress in 1892.

== Congressional service ==
Pritchard was elected as a Republican to the United States Senate in 1894 to fill the vacancy caused by the death of United States Senator Zebulon Baird Vance. He was reelected in 1897 and served from January 23, 1895, to March 3, 1903. The victory of the Republican-Populist alliance (or "fusion") in the 1894 legislative elections, and their subsequent domination of the North Carolina General Assembly was the key factor in Pritchard's initial election and subsequent reelection. He was Chairman of the Committee on Civil Service and Retrenchment for the 54th and 55th United States Congresses and Chairman of the Committee on Patents for the 56th and 57th United States Congresses.

On October 21, 1898, Pritchard sent a letter to President William McKinley, requesting federal marshals to protect black voters in the upcoming election. He warned that Democrats were stockpiling weapons and threatening black voters, and said that Democrats' claims of "Negro domination" were without basis. The letter was discussed by McKinley and his cabinet on October 24, but federal marshals were not sent as Governor Daniel Lindsay Russell had not made the request. As a result, intimidation by Red Shirts kept black voters away from the polls, resulting in a sweeping Democratic victory. On the day following the election, the Wilmington massacre broke out.

Pritchard began reversing his views on civil rights in 1900, becoming a lily-white and opposing black officeholders.

== Federal judicial service ==
Pritchard was nominated by President Theodore Roosevelt on November 10, 1903, to an Associate Justice seat on the Supreme Court of the District of Columbia (now the United States District Court for the District of Columbia) vacated by Associate Justice Harry M. Clabaugh. He was confirmed by the United States Senate on November 16, 1903, and received his commission the same day. His service terminated on June 1, 1904, due to his elevation to the Fourth Circuit. While in office Pritchard twice offered resolutions demanding that the Senate declare the grandfather clause a violation of the Fourteenth and Fifteenth Amendments, but both attempts failed.

Pritchard was nominated by President Roosevelt on April 27, 1904, to a joint seat on the United States Court of Appeals for the Fourth Circuit and the United States Circuit Courts for the Fourth Circuit vacated by Judge Charles Henry Simonton. He was confirmed by the Senate on April 27, 1904, and received his commission the same day. On December 31, 1911, the Circuit Courts were abolished and he thereafter served only on the Court of Appeals. His service terminated on April 10, 1921, due to his death in Asheville, North Carolina. He was interred in the Riverside Cemetery in Asheville, near fellow North Carolina Senators Thomas Lanier Clingman and Zebulon Baird Vance.

== Family ==
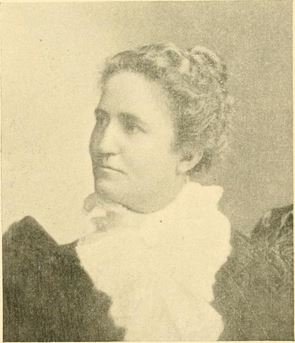
Mrs. Jeter Connelly Pritchard

Senator Pritchard married Augusta L. Ray in 1877 and they became the parents of three sons and a daughter—William D. (an army officer killed in the Philippines in 1904), George M. Pritchard (a politician in the Republican Party), Thomas A., and Ida (Mrs. Thomas S. Rollins). Following the death in 1886 of his wife, Pritchard married Melissa Bowman by whom he had another son, J. McKinley. After the death of his second wife in 1902, Judge Pritchard married Lillian E. Saum in 1903.

== Honor ==
Pritchard Park in downtown Asheville is named in Pritchard's memory.

== Sources ==
- "Jeter Connelly Pritchard". Biographical Directory of the United States Congress.
- Zucchino, David (2020). Wilmington's Lie: The Murderous Coup of 1898 and the Rise of White Supremacy. Atlantic Monthly Press. ISBN 9780802128386.

Party political offices
Preceded by William T. Faircloth	Republican nominee for Lieutenant Governor of North Carolina; 1888	Succeeded by James M. Moody
North Carolina House of Representatives
Preceded by D.S Ball	Member of the North Carolina House of Representatives from Madison County; 1885–1889	Succeeded by D.F. Lawson
Preceded by D.F. Lawson	Member of the North Carolina House of Representatives from Madison County; 1891–1893	Succeeded by Charles B. Mashburn
U.S. Senate
Preceded by Thomas Jordan Jarvis	U.S. senator (Class 3) from North Carolina; 1895–1903; Served alongside: Matt Whitaker Ransom, Marion Butler, Furnifold McLendel Simmons	Succeeded by Lee Slater Overman
Legal offices
Preceded by Harry M. Clabaugh	Associate Justice of the Supreme Court of the District of Columbia; 1903–1904	Succeeded by Wendell Phillips Stafford
Preceded by Charles Henry Simonton	Judge of the United States Circuit Courts for the Fourth Circuit; 1904–1911	Succeeded by Seat abolished
Preceded by Charles Henry Simonton	Judge of the United States Court of Appeals for the Fourth Circuit; 1904–1921	Succeeded by Edmund Waddill Jr.
