= 1950 United States Senate special election in North Carolina =

- November 7, 1950
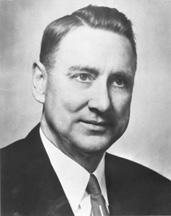

Nominee	Willis Smith	E. L. Galvin
Party	Democratic	Republican
Popular vote	364,912	177,753
Percentage	66.97%	32.62%
- County results Smith: 50–60% 60–70% 70–80% 80–90% >90% Galvin: 50–60% 60–70% 70–80%
Senator before election
Frank P. Graham
Democratic
Elected Senator
Willis Smith
Democratic

The 1950 United States Senate special election in North Carolina took place on November 7, 1950 in North Carolina as part of the 1950 Senate elections. The incumbent Democratic Senator J. Melville Broughton died two months into his term on March 6, 1949. Frank Porter Graham, the president of the University of North Carolina, was appointed to the vacant seat. Graham was defeated in the Democratic primary by former Speaker of the North Carolina House of Representatives Willis Smith, who would go on to win election by a margin of 34.4%. Smith would die on June 26, 1953, with Alton Lennon appointed to the vacancy.

== Democratic primary ==
=== Candidates ===
- Olla Ray Boyd, pig farmer and perennial candidate
- Frank Porter Graham, the incumbent Senator
- Robert R. Reynolds, former U.S. Senator
- Willis Smith, former Speaker of the North Carolina House of Representatives

=== Campaign ===
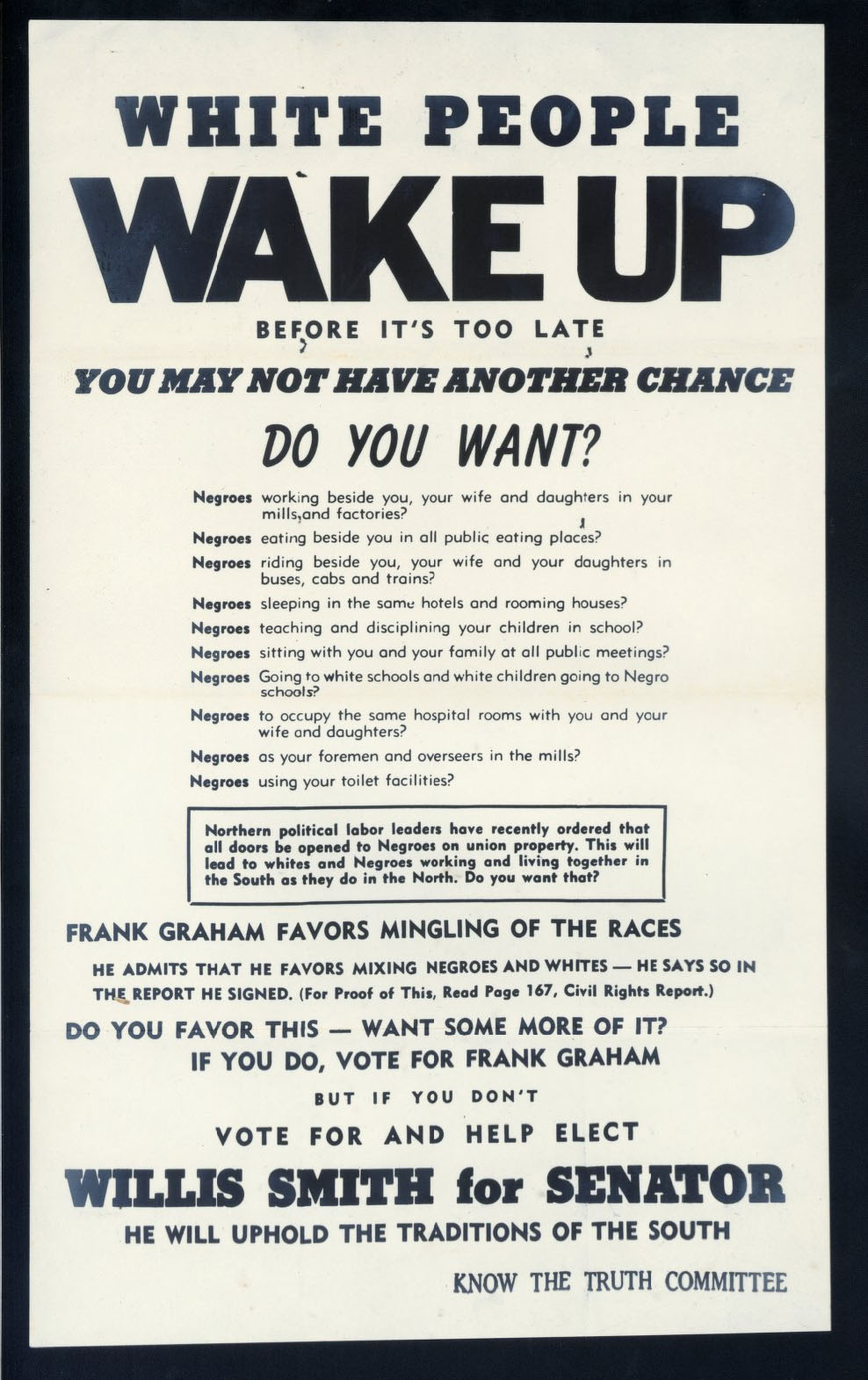
Willis Smith campaign flyer

Electoral law at the time did not mandate a runoff election, with the losing candidate able to request one. Following Sweatt v. Painter, which challenged segregation in Texas, Jesse Helms led an advertising campaign through WRAL to successfully encourage Smith to call for a runoff.

The primary runoff pitched a progressive New Deal Democrat (Graham) against a traditional pro-segregation Democrat (Smith). Graham sought to emphasise his commitments to education and other social programmes, however Smith's relentless campaigning on issues of race ultimately prevailed.

=== Results ===
Democratic primary
Party	Candidate	Votes	%
Democratic	Frank Porter Graham (incumbent)	303,605	49.09
Democratic	Willis Smith	250,222	40.46
Democratic	Robert R. Reynolds	58,752	9.50
Democratic	Olla Ray Boyd	5,900	0.95
Turnout		618,479	

Democratic runoff
Party	Candidate	Votes	%	±%
Democratic	Willis Smith	281,114	51.78	+11.32
Democratic	Frank Porter Graham (incumbent)	261,789	48.22	−0.87
Majority		19,325	3.56	
Turnout		542,903		

==== Results maps ====
Primary election Smith: 40–49% 50–59% 60–69% 70–79% Graham: 40–49% 50–59% 60–69% 70–79%

Runoff election Smith: 50–59% 60–69% 70–79% Graham: 50–59% 60–69% 70–79% 80–89%

== General election ==
1950 United States Senate Special election in North Carolina
Party	Candidate	Votes	%	±%
Democratic	Willis Smith	364,912	66.97	−3.73
Republican	E. L. Galvin	177,753	32.62	+3.82
Write-In	Frank P. Graham (incumbent)	2,259	0.41	+0.41
Majority		187,159	34.35	
Turnout		544,924		
Democratic hold		Swing		
