= 1954 United States Senate election in North Carolina =

- November 2, 1954
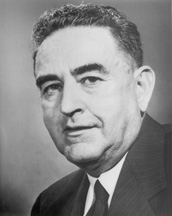

Nominee	W. Kerr Scott	Paul C. West
Party	Democratic	Republican
Popular vote	408,312	211,322
Percentage	65.90%	34.10%
- County results Scott: 50–60% 60–70% 70–80% 80–90% >90% West: 50–60% 60–70% 70–80%
Senator before election
Alton A. Lennon
Democratic
Elected Senator
W. Kerr Scott
Democratic

The 1954 United States Senate election in North Carolina was held on November 2, 1954. Interim Democratic Senator Alton A. Lennon, who had been appointed to fill the vacant seat left by the death of Willis Smith, ran for re-election. Lennon lost the Democratic primary to former Governor W. Kerr Scott, who easily won the general election over Republican Paul C. West.

Scott also won the simultaneous special election to complete the remainder of Willis Smith's term unopposed.

On the same day, Sam Ervin won a special election to North Carolina's other Senate seat, to complete the unexpired term of Clyde Hoey, making this one of the extremely rare occasions when one state held three U.S. Senate elections simultaneously.

== Background ==
Incumbent Senator Willis Smith died on July 10, 1953. Governor of North Carolina William B. Umstead appointed former State Senator Alton A. Lennon to fill the vacant seat until a successor could be duly elected. The special election for the remainder of Smith's term was scheduled for November 2, 1954, simultaneous with the general election for the next term.

== Democratic primary ==
=== Candidates ===
- W.M. Bostick (Note: Not a candidate in the simultaneous special election primary.)
- Olla Ray Boyd
- Alton A. Lennon, interim Senator
- W. Kerr Scott, former Governor of North Carolina (1949–1953)
- Henry L. Sprinkle
- A.E. Turner
- Alvin Wingfield Jr.

=== Results (general) ===
1954 Democratic Senate special primary
Party	Candidate	Votes	%
Democratic	W. Kerr Scott	312,053	50.77%
Democratic	Alton A. Lennon (incumbent)	286,730	46.65%
Democratic	Alvin Wingfield, Jr.	7,999	1.30%
Democratic	Henry L. Sprinkle	2,548	0.42%
Democratic	A.E. Turner	2,361	0.38%
Democratic	Olla Ray Boyd	1,674	0.27%
Democratic	W.M. Bostick	1,293	0.21%
Total votes		614,658	100.00%

Scott secured the Democratic nomination for the term beginning in 1955.

=== Results (special) ===
1954 Democratic Senate special primary
Party	Candidate	Votes	%
Democratic	W. Kerr Scott	274,264	49.34%
Democratic	Alton A. Lennon (incumbent)	264,265	47.54%
Democratic	Alvin Wingfield, Jr.	12,372	2.23%
Democratic	Henry L. Sprinkle	5,013	0.90%
Total votes		555,914	100.00%

Although Lennon qualified for a run-off in the special primary election, he declined to seek one as he had already been eliminated from the race for the full term.

== General election ==
=== Results (general) ===
1954 U.S. Senate election in North Carolina
Party	Candidate	Votes	%	±%
Democratic	W. Kerr Scott	408,312	65.90%	▼1.07
Republican	Paul C. West	211,322	34.10%	▲1.48
Write-in		4	0.00%	▼0.42
Total votes		619,638	100.00%	

=== Results (special) ===
West did not qualify for the ballot in the special election, leaving Kerr unopposed.

1954 U.S. Senate election in North Carolina
Party	Candidate	Votes	%
Democratic	W. Kerr Scott	402,268	100.00%
Republican	Paul C. West (write-in)	8	0.00%
Write-in		7	0.00%
Total votes		402,283	100.00%
