= Governor Perry =

Governor Perry may refer to:

- Benjamin Franklin Perry (1805–1886), 72nd Governor of South Carolina
- Edward A. Perry (1831–1889), 14th Governor of Florida
- Madison S. Perry (1814–1865), 4th Governor of Florida
- Rick Perry (born 1950), 47th Governor of Texas
