= Ralph Scott =

Ralph Scott may refer to:

- Ralph James Scott (1905–1983), American Congressman from North Carolina
- Ralph H. Scott (1903–1989), American politician from North Carolina
- Ralph Scott (American football) (1894–1936), American football player
- Ralph J. Scott (fireboat) (1925–2003), American fireboat
- Mickey Scott (Ralph Robert Scott, 1947–2011), American baseball player
