= Hugh Lennox Bond =

American judge (1828–1893)

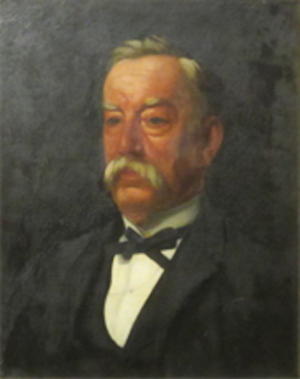

Judge of the United States Court of Appeals for the Fourth Circuit
- In office June 16, 1891 – October 24, 1893
- Appointed by: operation of law
- Preceded by: Seat established by 26 Stat. 826
- Succeeded by: Charles Henry Simonton

Judge of the United States Circuit Courts for the Fourth Circuit
- In office July 13, 1870 – October 24, 1893
- Appointed by: Ulysses S. Grant
- Preceded by: Seat established by 16 Stat. 44
- Succeeded by: Charles Henry Simonton

Personal details
- Born: Hugh Lennox Bond; December 16, 1828 Baltimore, Maryland, U.S.
- Died: October 24, 1893 (aged 64) Baltimore, Maryland, U.S.
- Resting place: Green Mount Cemetery
- Education: New York University read law

Hugh Lennox Bond (December 16, 1828 – October 24, 1893) was a United States circuit judge of the United States Circuit Courts for the Fourth Circuit.

== Education and career ==
Born in Baltimore, Maryland, Bond graduated from the University of the City of New York (now New York University) in 1848 and read law to enter the bar in 1851. He was in private practice in Baltimore from 1851 to 1860, and was a leader of the local Know-Nothing party in the 1850s. He was a Judge of the Baltimore City Criminal Court from 1860 to 1867, thereafter returning to private practice in Baltimore until 1870. In 1867, Bond lost the Maryland gubernatorial election against Oden Bowie.

=== Letter advocating recruitment of slaves ===
During the Civil War, Bond’s letter of August 15, 1863, to Secretary of War Edwin M. Stanton was published in newspapers. Bond had been an abolitionist since before the Civil War; in his letter, he advocated the enlistment of slaves in the state of Maryland, even though they were not freed by the Emancipation Proclamation, which limited freedom to areas of rebellion. His advocacy soon became a reality.

== Federal judicial service ==
Bond was nominated by President Ulysses S. Grant on April 6, 1870, to the United States Circuit Courts for the Fourth Circuit, to a new seat authorized by 16 Stat. 44. He was confirmed by the United States Senate on July 13, 1870, and received his commission the same day. Bond was assigned by operation of law to additional and concurrent service on the United States Court of Appeals for the Fourth Circuit on June 16, 1891, to a new seat authorized by 26 Stat. 826 (Evarts Act). His service terminated on October 24, 1893, due to his death in Baltimore.

=== Notable cases ===
Bond and George S. Bryan presided over the trial of Ku Klux Klan members in Columbia, South Carolina during December 1871. The defendants were sentenced to five to three months incarceration with fines.

In 1876, Bond decided the South Carolina Presidential Electoral case.

== Personal life ==
Bond died on October 24, 1893, at his home in Baltimore. He was buried in Green Mount Cemetery in Baltimore.

== Sources ==
Party political offices
First	Republican nominee for Governor of Maryland; 1867	Succeeded by Jacob Tome
Legal offices
Preceded by Seat established by 16 Stat. 44	Judge of the United States Circuit Courts for the Fourth Circuit; 1870–1893	Succeeded by Charles Henry Simonton
Preceded by Seat established by 26 Stat. 826	Judge of the United States Court of Appeals for the Fourth Circuit; 1891–1893	Succeeded by Charles Henry Simonton
