= Andrew Gordon Magrath =

American politician

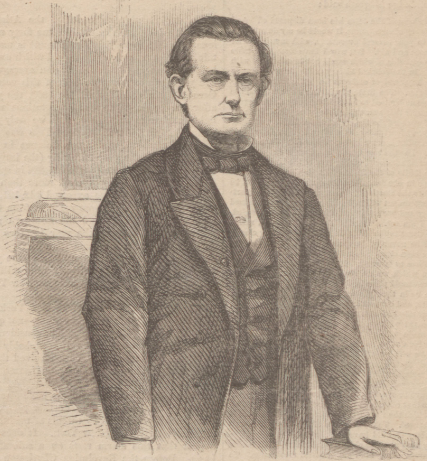
- McGrath c. 1861

71st Governor of South Carolina
- In office December 20, 1864 – May 25, 1865 (Note: Overthrown by Union Army)
- Lieutenant: Robert McCaw
- Preceded by: Milledge Luke Bonham
- Succeeded by: Second Military District (as military government); Benjamin Franklin Perry (as governor)

Judge of the Confederate States District Court for the District of South Carolina
- In office May 6, 1861 – December 20, 1864
- Appointed by: Jefferson Davis
- Preceded by: Office established
- Succeeded by: Benjamin F. Perry

Secretary of State of South Carolina
- In office November 13, 1860 – April 3, 1861
- Governor: Francis Wilkinson Pickens

Judge of the United States District Court for the District of South Carolina
- In office May 12, 1856 – November 7, 1860
- Appointed by: Franklin Pierce
- Preceded by: Robert Budd Gilchrist
- Succeeded by: George Seabrook Bryan

Member of the South Carolina House of Representatives from St. Philip's and St. Michael's Parish
- In office November 26, 1838 – November 28, 1842

Personal details
- Born: Andrew Gordon Magrath; February 8, 1813 Charleston, South Carolina, U.S.
- Died: April 9, 1893 (aged 80) Charleston, South Carolina, U.S.
- Resting place: Magnolia Cemetery; Charleston, South Carolina, U.S.
- Party: Democratic
- Education: University of South Carolina (A.B.); Harvard Law School read law

Andrew Gordon Magrath (February 8, 1813 – April 9, 1893) was an American politician and jurist. He was a United States district judge of the United States District Court for the District of South Carolina and a Confederate District Judge for the District of South Carolina. He was elected as the last governor of South Carolina under the Confederacy in December 1864 and was arrested for treason at the close of the American Civil War in May 1865.

== Education and career ==
Born on February 8, 1813, in Charleston, South Carolina, Magrath received an Artium Baccalaureus degree in 1831 from South Carolina College (now the University of South Carolina), attended Harvard Law School and read law with James L. Petigru in 1835. He entered private practice in Charleston from 1835 to 1839, in 1841, and from 1843 to 1856. He was a member of the South Carolina House of Representatives in 1840, and 1842. Magrath was a member of the Democratic Party.

== Federal judicial service ==
Magrath was nominated by President Franklin Pierce on May 9, 1856, to a seat on the United States District Court for the District of South Carolina vacated by Judge Robert Budd Gilchrist. He was confirmed by the United States Senate on May 12, 1856, and received his commission the same day.

Magrath's service was notable for his strongly proslavery decisions. In the trial of William C. Corrie for his ownership of the slave vessel Wanderer in 1858, Magrath rewrote the law from the bench by announcing that bringing enslaved people from Africa was not a crime if they had been enslaved prior to their purchase.

His judicial service terminated on November 7, 1860, when he resigned following the election of Abraham Lincoln as US President. Magrath dramatically tore off his judicial robe in the courtroom when he announced his resignation, denouncing the United States in a speech that made him very popular with South Carolina's pro-secession politicians.

=== Resignation address ===
In the political history of the United States, an event has happened of ominous import to fifteen slaveholding States. The State of which we are citizens has been always understood to have to have deliberately fixed its purpose whenever that event should happen. Feeling an assurance of what will be the action of the State, I consider it my duty, without delay, to prepare to obey its wishes. That preparation is made by the resignation of the office I have held. For the last time, I have, as a Judge of the United States, administered the laws of the United States, within the limits of the State of South Carolina. While thus acting in obedience to a sense of duty, I cannot be indifferent to the emotions it must produce. That department of Government which. I believe, has best maintained its integrity and preserved its purity, has been suspended. So far as I am concerned, the Temple of Justice, raised under the Constitution of the United States, is now closed. If it shall be never again opened, I thank God that its doors have been closed before its altar has been desecrated with sacrifices to tyranny.

== Confederate service ==
Magrath was a member of South Carolina's secession convention in 1860, and was the first speaker at the signing ceremony. He was the Secretary of State of South Carolina from 1860 to 1861, and later was a Judge of the Confederate District Court for the District of South Carolina from 1861 to 1864. Magrath was then elected as Governor of South Carolina by the state legislature on December 18, 1864, making him the last of the state's governors under the Confederate States of America. He was also the last of South Carolina's governors to be chosen by the legislature rather than by a popular vote.

At this stage of the war, public sentiment had turned against the central Confederate government based in Richmond, as states sought to defend themselves against Union forces by raising local militia troops. Magrath called on the state to prioritize itself rather than send more South Carolina troops into Confederate army service, and the legislature passed a law allowing the governor to exempt essentially anyone he wanted from Confederate conscription.

In January 1865, Union General William T. Sherman began his Carolinas Campaign, marching US troops into the state from neighboring Georgia. Magrath appealed to the Confederate government to send more troops, and also asked the governors of Georgia and North Carolina to coordinate their efforts to resist invasion. Magrath begged Confederate President Jefferson Davis to defend “the city which first proclaimed secession [Columbia, SC] and the state which first adopted it,” but at this stage the Confederate government was on the verge of losing its own capital in Virginia.

As Union troops invaded the state, Magrath abandoned the state capital at Columbia on February 16, fleeing to Union, South Carolina, then to Spartanburg. Magrath attempted to reconvene the state legislature at Greenville on April 25, but was unable to assemble a quorum and that city had to be abandoned as well when it was threatened by Union attacks.

Despite the collapse of the Confederacy, Magrath attempted to maintain control over the state government even following the surrender of Confederate troops in Virginia and the Carolinas. On May 15, Union General Quincy Adams Gillmore announced that Magrath was charged with treason and that the state's population should ignore the governor's decrees. Magrath was arrested by US forces on May 25, and imprisoned at Fort Pulaski.

== Later career and death ==
After his release from prison in December 1865, Magrath resumed his private law practice in Charleston from 1865 to 1893. He died on April 9, 1893, in Charleston. He was interred at Magnolia Cemetery in Charleston.

== Sources ==
Legal offices
| Preceded by Robert Budd Gilchrist | Judge of the United States District Court for the District of South Carolina; 1856–1860 | Succeeded by George Seabrook Bryan |
Political offices
| Preceded by Milledge Luke Bonham | Governor of South Carolina; 1864–1865 | Succeeded by Benjamin Franklin Perry |
