= Robert W. Scott (1861–1929) =

American politician

Member of the North Carolina Senate
- In office January 1929 – May 16, 1929
- Preceded by: William Banks Horton
- Succeeded by: Thomas Henry Hatchett
- Constituency: 16th district
- In office January 1901 – January 1903
- Preceded by: J. M. Satterfield
- Succeeded by: R. L. Walker
- Constituency: 18th district

Member of the North Carolina House of Representatives from Alamance County
- In office January 1903 – January 1905
- Preceded by: E. Long
- Succeeded by: W. J. Graham
- In office January 1889 – January 1893
- Preceded by: Thomas M. Holt
- Succeeded by: J. A. Long

Personal details
- Born: Robert Walter Scott; July 24, 1861 Hawfields, North Carolina
- Died: May 16, 1929 (aged 67) Hawfields, North Carolina
- Party: Democratic
- Spouse(s): Lizzie Hughes (m. 1883) Ella Anderson (m. 1915)
- Children: 14, incl. W. Kerr and Ralph

Robert Walter Scott (July 24, 1861 – May 16, 1929) was an American farmer and politician. He was the father of W. Kerr and Ralph H. Scott and the grandfather and namesake of Robert W. Scott.
