= 1948 North Carolina gubernatorial election =

- November 2, 1948
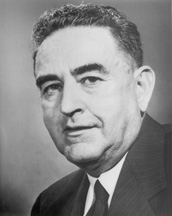

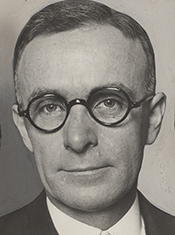
Nominee	W. Kerr Scott	George M. Pritchard
Party	Democratic	Republican
Popular vote	570,995	206,166
Percentage	73.16%	26.41%
- County results Scott: 50–60% 60–70% 70–80% 80–90% >90% Pritchard: 50–60% 60–70% 70–80%
Governor before election
R. Gregg Cherry
Democratic
Elected Governor
W. Kerr Scott
Democratic

The 1948 North Carolina gubernatorial election was held on November 2, 1948. Democratic nominee W. Kerr Scott defeated Republican nominee George M. Pritchard with 73.16% of the vote. This was the first gubernatorial election in North Carolina where a woman appeared on the ballot.

== Primary elections ==
Primary elections were held on May 29, 1948.

=== Democratic primary ===
==== Candidates ====
- W. Kerr Scott, former North Carolina Commissioner of Agriculture
- Charles M. Johnson, North Carolina State Treasurer
- R. Mayne Albright
- Oscar G. Barker
- W.F. Stanley
- Olla Ray Boyd

==== Results ====
Democratic primary results
Party	Candidate	Votes	%
Democratic	Charles M. Johnson	170,141	40.21
Democratic	W. Kerr Scott	161,293	38.12
Democratic	R. Mayne Albright	76,281	18.03
Democratic	Oscar G. Barker	10,871	2.57
Democratic	W.F. Stanley	2,428	0.57
Democratic	Olla Ray Boyd	2,111	0.50
Total votes		423,125	100.00

Democratic primary runoff results
Party	Candidate	Votes	%
Democratic	W. Kerr Scott	217,620	54.36
Democratic	Charles M. Johnson	182,684	45.64
Total votes		400,304	100.00

== General election ==
=== Candidates ===
Major party candidates

- W. Kerr Scott, Democratic
- George M. Pritchard, Republican

Other candidates

- Mary Price, Progressive

=== Results ===
1948 North Carolina gubernatorial election
Party	Candidate	Votes	%	±%
Democratic	W. Kerr Scott	570,995	73.16%	
Republican	George M. Pritchard	206,166	26.41%	
Progressive	Mary Price	3,363	0.43%	
Majority		364,829		
Turnout		780,525		
Democratic hold		Swing		
