= Plowden Weston =

American plantation owner and politician (1821–1864)

50th Lieutenant Governor of South Carolina
- In office December 17, 1862 – January 25, 1864
- Governor: Milledge Luke Bonham
- Preceded by: William Harllee
- Succeeded by: Robert McCaw

Personal details
- Born: August 21, 1821 London, England
- Died: January 25, 1864 (aged 42) Conway, South Carolina
- Party: Democratic
- Education: University of Cambridge

Plowden CJ Weston (1821-1864) was an American plantation owner and politician who served as the 50th lieutenant governor of South Carolina.

== Biography ==
Plowden Weston was born in London, England in 1821 and migrated to the United States at a young age. Weston's father purchased the Laurel Hill Plantation in Beaufort, South Carolina, where Weston spent most of his childhood years. At age twelve, he returned to England to attend Harrow School, a private school for boys. Weston later attended the University of Cambridge. In 1847, Weston married an English woman and returned to the United States.

Weston received the Hagley plantation as a wedding gift and became one of the wealthiest men in South Carolina and one of the largest slaveholders.

Weston was elected Lieutenant Governor of South Carolina in 1862. He died in office at age 42 in 1864. He died of tuberculosis. At the time of his death, he owned 185 slaves and his estate was valued at approximately $500,000 (10 million dollars adjusted for inflation in 2023).
