= Justice Bryan =

Justice Bryan may refer to:

- Charles Henry Bryan (1822–1877), associate justice of the Supreme Court of California
- George Bryan (1731–1791), judge of the Colonial Pennsylvania Supreme Court
- Tommy Bryan (born 1956), associate justice of the Supreme Court of Alabama
- William Shepard Bryan (1827–1906), associate justice of the Maryland Court of Appeals

== See also ==
- Judge Bryan (disambiguation)
