= Edward Kidder Graham =

American educational administrator

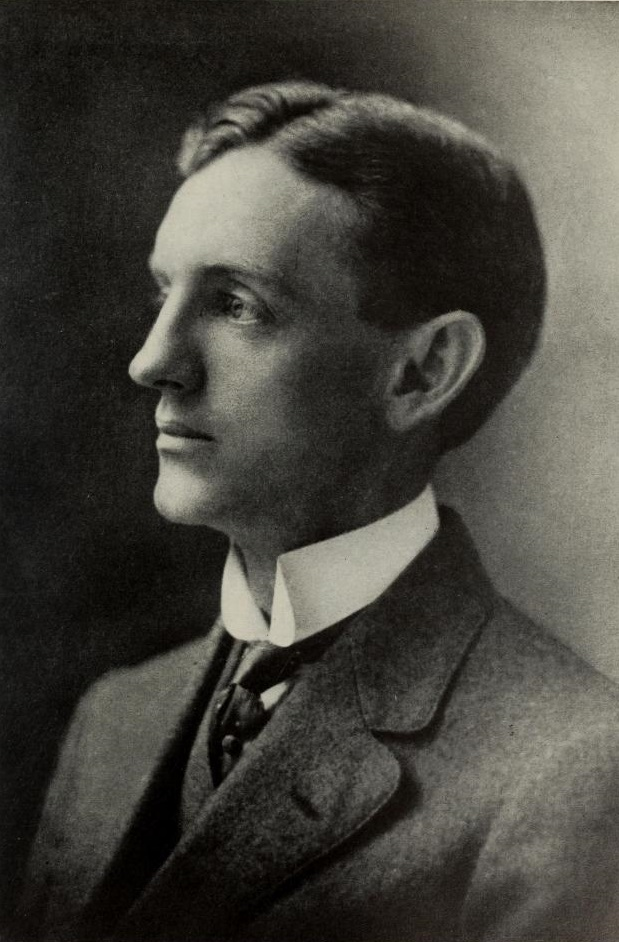
Mr. Edward Kidder Graham

Edward Kidder Graham (October 11, 1876 – October 26, 1918) was an American educational administrator, the tenth president of the University of North Carolina (UNC).

== Biography ==
A native of Charlotte, North Carolina, Graham received his undergraduate degree in philosophy from UNC in 1894, where he was a member of Sigma Alpha Epsilon fraternity before attending Columbia University for a master's degree in English. He took a position teaching English at UNC in 1907, notably becoming the first professor at the university to teach a course in journalism. After a rapid rise within the department and the College of Liberal Arts, Graham became president of the university in 1913, when previous president Francis Preston Venable stepped down for health reasons. He served in that capacity until his death in Chapel Hill during the 1918 flu pandemic. In 1930, his first cousin Frank Porter Graham rose to serve as president of UNC. In 1931, the University honored E. K. Graham by erecting the Graham Memorial Building, which initially served as the university's student union, then the home of the Department of Dramatic Art, and now serves as the Johnston Center for Undergraduate Excellence.
