= George M. Pritchard =

American politician (1886–1955)

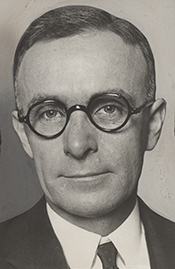

Member of the U.S. House of Representatives from North Carolina's 10th district
- In office March 4, 1929 – March 3, 1931
- Preceded by: Zebulon Weaver
- Succeeded by: Zebulon Weaver

Personal details
- Born: January 4, 1886 Mars Hill, North Carolina
- Died: April 24, 1955 (aged 69) Asheville, North Carolina
- Party: Republican

George Moore Pritchard (January 4, 1886 – April 24, 1955) was a lawyer, Republican politician, and one-term U.S. representative from North Carolina. He was the son of Senator Jeter C. Pritchard and Augusta Ray.

Pritchard served in the North Carolina House of Representatives in 1916 and 1917. In 1928, Pritchard was elected to the 71st United States Congress from North Carolina's 10th congressional district. In 1930, he did not run for re-election, but instead ran unsuccessfully for the U.S. Senate against Democrat Josiah W. Bailey. All his later attempts at political comebacks—running for Governor of North Carolina in 1940 and 1948, and for the U.S. House in 1952—were unsuccessful.

Served as an honorary pallbearer for author Thomas Wolfe's funeral in 1938 in Asheville, NC.

Party political offices
Preceded by A. A. Whitener	Republican nominee for U.S. Senator from North Carolina (Class 2); 1930	Succeeded by Frank C. Patton
Preceded by Frank C. Patton	Republican nominee for Governor of North Carolina; 1948	Succeeded by Herbert F. "Chub" Seawell Jr.
U.S. House of Representatives
Preceded by Zebulon Weaver	Member of the U.S. House of Representatives from North Carolina's 10th congressional district 1929–1931	Succeeded by Zebulon Weaver
