= Frank Porter Graham =

American educator and activist (1886–1972)

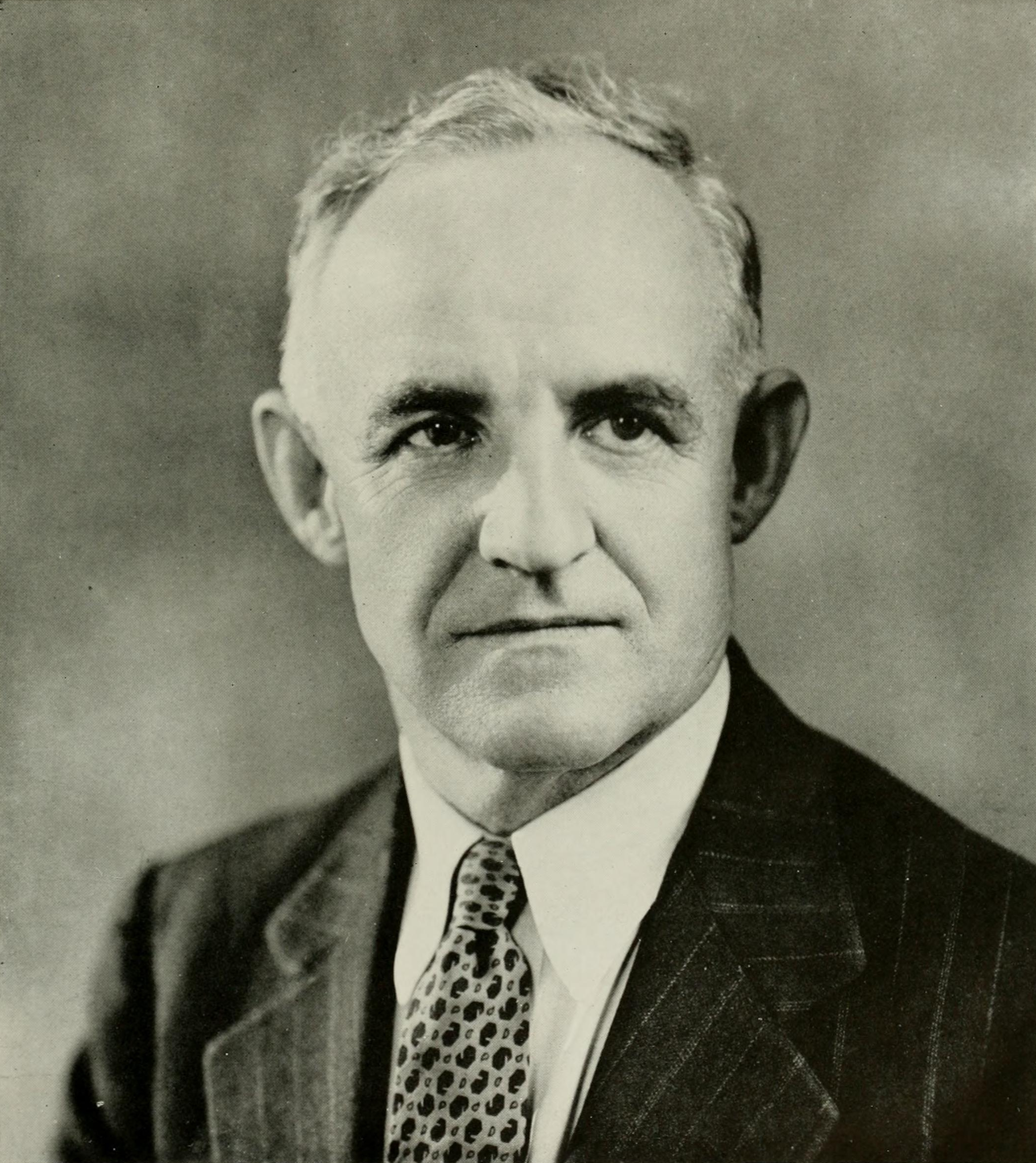
- Graham c. 1945

United States Senator from North Carolina
- In office March 29, 1949 – November 26, 1950
- Appointed by: W. Kerr Scott
- Preceded by: Melville Broughton
- Succeeded by: Willis Smith

President of the University of North Carolina System
- In office 1930–1949
- Preceded by: Harry Woodburn Chase
- Succeeded by: Gordon Gray

Personal details
- Born: October 14, 1886 Fayetteville, North Carolina, U.S.
- Died: February 16, 1972 (aged 85) Chapel Hill, North Carolina, U.S.
- Party: Democratic
- Spouse: Marian Drane
- Relatives: Moonlight Graham; Edward Kidder Graham
- Education: University of North Carolina, Chapel Hill (BA, LLB); Columbia University (MA)

Frank Porter Graham (October 14, 1886 – February 16, 1972) was an American educator and political activist. A professor of history, he was elected President of the University of North Carolina at Chapel Hill in 1930, and he later became the first President of the consolidated University of North Carolina system.

Graham was an active champion of many liberal causes including academic freedom, economic justice, civil rights, disarmament and world peace. He served on numerous advisory boards for Presidents Franklin D. Roosevelt and Harry S. Truman, and in 1949 he was appointed by the North Carolina governor to fill a vacant seat in the United States Senate. His effort to win election in the following year turned into a bitter and ultimately unsuccessful struggle with conservative Democrat Willis Smith.

In 1951 he was appointed as a United Nations mediator for the Kashmir dispute between India and Pakistan. He pursued that elusive goal for 16 years, and he continued his advocacy work on many other issues, until failing health forced him to retire from public life in 1967.

== Early life ==
Frank Porter Graham was born in Fayetteville, North Carolina in 1886, the sixth of nine children born to Alexander and Katherine Bryan Sloan Graham. His father was superintendent of the Charlotte school system for 25 years, and many of his siblings and other family relations were teachers. His older brother, Archibald Wright "Moonlight" Graham (December 28, 1879 – August 25, 1965), was a professional baseball player with the New York Giants and later a physician (and the inspiration for a character in the 1989 film Field of Dreams). Alexander Graham Middle School in Charlotte is named for his father. It opened in 1920 on Morehead Street near the Grahams' home and is now in a newer building on Runnymede Lane.

Graham attended the original University of North Carolina (UNC, now called University of North Carolina at Chapel Hill), from which he was graduated with Phi Beta Kappa honors in 1909. He was an active and popular student, serving as the editor of the college newspaper and the yearbook, president of the debating society, president of the campus YMCA, Senior class president, and the university's head cheerleader. He thereafter studied law and received his license in 1913. He received a graduate degree in 1916 from Columbia University. While he was studying law, Graham worked as a high school teacher in Raleigh, North Carolina. He went on to serve as a history instructor at UNC beginning in 1915. He interrupted his teaching career to enlist in 1917 in the United States Marine Corps for service in World War I. Enlisted as a private, he was discharged as a first lieutenant in 1919.

Graham returned to the History department at UNC and was promoted to a professorship in 1927, despite not having earned a Ph.D. He also served briefly as dean of students.

== President of the University of North Carolina ==
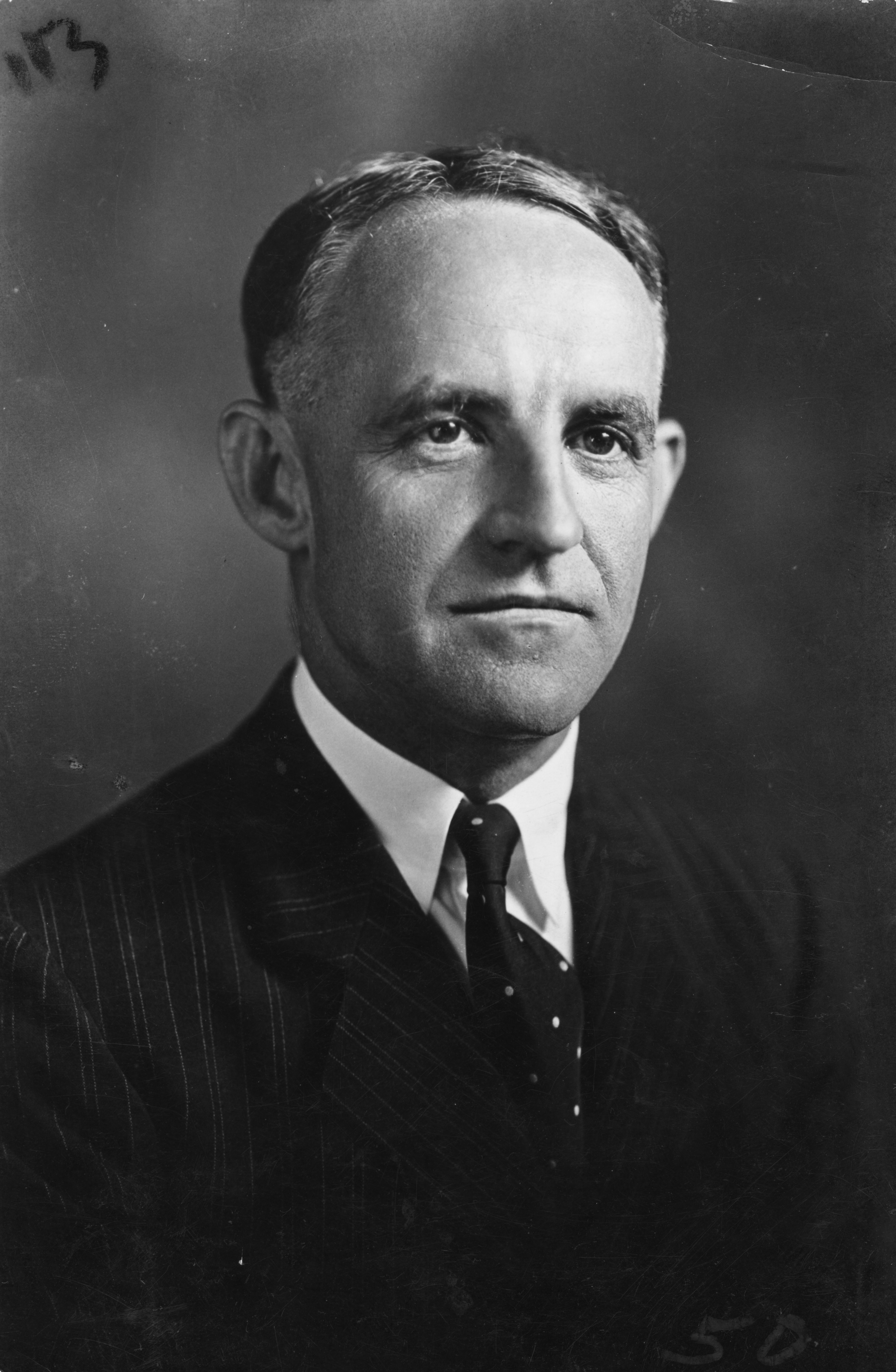
Graham c. 1935

In June 1930, Graham was elected President of UNC, succeeding Harry Woodburn Chase. As The New York Times put it: "He was literally 'drafted' for the presidency, for he desired to teach, and yielded only to the unanimous vote of the trustees." His formal induction ceremony on November 11, 1931, drew such a large crowd that it had to be held in Kenan Stadium. Graham used the date of Armistice Day to underscore his message that schools and universities have the responsibility of guiding young people away from war. His first cousin Edward Kidder Graham had been President of UNC from 1913 to 1918.

In July of the following year, he married Marian Drane of Baltimore, Maryland. Their wedding ceremony was performed by the bride's father, who was the rector of Baltimore's historic St. Paul's Episcopal Church for more than 50 years.

Just months after his marriage, in November 1932, Graham was chosen to lead the consolidation of the University of North Carolina system, which brought together the three public colleges for whites in the state: Graham's UNC at Chapel Hill, the North Carolina College for Women (now the University of North Carolina at Greensboro), and State College (now North Carolina State University). He served as President of the university system for the next 17 years. He was an approachable, friendly, and popular president, known to all as "Dr. Frank".

Graham was a member of the executive committee of the National Association of State Universities, and served as vice president of the Association of American Universities. He was also the first president of the Southern Council on International Relations, an organization founded in 1938 to promote international studies throughout public schools in the South.

Graham was an early advocate of reform in college athletics. In 1929, the Carnegie Foundation — a private organization that researches and recommends education policy — published "American College Athletics", a report that accused many schools of using cash payments to recruit athletes, with no regard for academic performance. Partially in response to that report, in 1935 Graham worked with his colleagues at the National Association of State Universities to develop a plan—eventually known as the "Graham Plan"—that called for the elimination of preferential treatment for college athletes, and a general de-emphasis of football specifically. While not implemented nationally, the Graham Plan was passed by the Southern Conference (of which the University of North Carolina and North Carolina State were members) in February 1936. The plan was in direct contradiction to rules implemented by the Southeastern Conference at the same time that embraced athletic scholarships, making them transparent. The financial aid provisions of the Graham Plan were repealed by the Southern Conference in December 1937, after colleges complained that they were put at a disadvantage to other schools and were forcing students to lie about financial aid they received. The University of Virginia left the Southern Conference due to the Graham Plan, indicating that its students could not comply with the regulations without violating its honor code.

== Early government work ==
In 1934, President Franklin D. Roosevelt appointed Graham as chairman of his Advisory Council on Economic Security, which made proposals that led to the Social Security Act the following year. At the same time, Graham served as vice chairman of the consumers board of the National Recovery Administration.

He headed the Advisory Committee on Economic Conditions in the South which in 1938 drafted a report detailing the dire position of the region. Roosevelt issued the 15-chapter report, drawing public attention to what it deemed "the nation's number one economic problem". Immediately afterward, Graham helped establish the Southern Conference for Human Welfare (SCHW), an advocacy group that organized poverty relief efforts and promoted New Deal policies. Its first meeting was held in Birmingham, Alabama in November 1938, drawing together progressives from all across the South in "the most significant attempt by Southerners, up to that time, to introduce a far-reaching agenda of change".

During World War II, Graham served as a member of the National War Labor Board from 1942 to 1945. More than any other member, he pressed the Board to address the concerns of African Americans seeking fair wages and equal treatment in the workplace.

After Roosevelt's death, new President Harry S. Truman continued to use Graham, and appointed him to the President's Committee on Civil Rights in 1946. But in the following year, Graham was mentioned in hearings held by the House Committee Investigating Un-American Activities for his involvement with the SCHW, which was alleged to be a Communist front organization. Graham denied any Communist affiliation, but was tarnished by accusations of "pinkish" sympathies for years.

During this time, Graham became involved with United Nations diplomatic work. In October 1947, President Truman appointed him to the UN commission arbitrating peace in the Indonesian National Revolution, a thorny affair that seemed to hold little chance for mediation. Still, the appointment of Graham, together with foreign counterparts of equal gravitas, displayed a clear determination for the peace talks to succeed, a situation recognized in The New York Times which praised "the high character of the Committee". Graham helped open direct negotiations between Indonesian and Dutch representatives at Batavia aboard USS Renville in December 1947. After his return, he was named adviser to the Secretary of State on Indonesian affairs.

== United States Senator ==
North Carolina's state agriculture commissioner W. Kerr Scott was elected Governor in November 1948. Like Graham, Scott was a pro-Truman Democrat who had supported the New Deal. Two months after Scott's inauguration in January 1949, incumbent U.S. Senator J. Melville Broughton died in office. Broughton's death left Scott with the responsibility of choosing a replacement. After three weeks of intense speculation throughout March as to whom the governor might choose, attention focused on individuals ranging from the senator's widow, who expressed no interest; Scott's former campaign manager, Capus Miller Waynick; another Scott supporter, Major Lennox Polk McLendon, a lawyer from Greensboro, North Carolina; former Senator Umstead; and the governor himself. Scott appointed Graham, which surprised many political observers.

At the time of his appointment, Graham had never sought nor served in any political office, an unusual phenomenon at the time for North Carolina senators. Also atypical was that the particular Senate seat Graham occupied was in a period of considerable turnover. Beginning with the death of Senator Josiah W. Bailey in 1946, and concluding with the election of B. Everett Jordan in 1958, no fewer than eight men served in the seat in a dozen years.

== 1950 Democratic primary ==
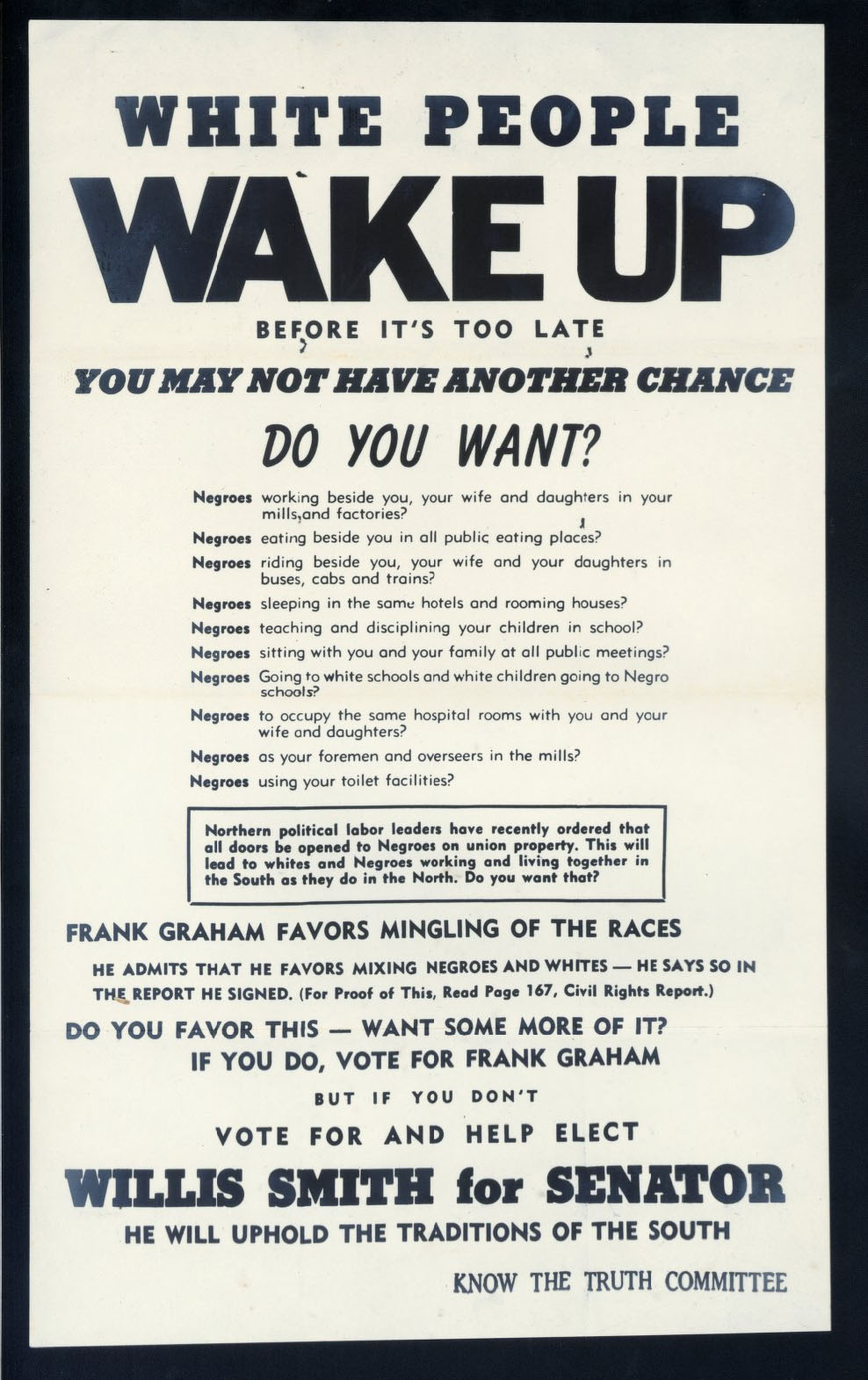
A flyer by the "Know the Truth Committee" supporting Willis Smith against Graham

Graham faced two opponents in the 1950 Democratic primary, including former Senator Robert R. Reynolds and former Speaker of the North Carolina House of Representatives Willis Smith. Reynolds was eliminated with only 10% of the vote, while Smith and Graham received 41% and 49% respectively. Graham was one percentage point below the threshold of receiving the nomination outright, and Smith could have chosen to engage Graham in a runoff. Smith initially declined, but when activists rallied outside his house in a show of support, Smith changed his mind.

In the runoff, Smith ran as an anti-Truman Democrat. According to his staffers, Smith never said anything outright racist, but some of his supporters released unofficial pamphlets stirring up fears of an integrated society. Fueled by their intense dislike for the progressive Graham, conservatives turned the Smith campaign into an openly racist crusade.

At the time of the election, few African-Americans were voting in North Carolina because of Jim Crow laws designed to disenfranchise them. Those blacks who were registered were mostly Republicans who cast ballots only in routine general elections. Graham was hence unable to appeal to many black voters, and he did not call for immediate integration, either. Graham was not a natural campaigner and hesitated even to ask voters for their vote. His political views were different from most North Carolinians'.

In the virtually all-white Democratic primaries, the tactics of Smith's campaign supporters (among whom was future Republican Senator Jesse Helms) worked along with these other factors, and Smith prevailed by a narrow 52%-48%.

== Post-Senate ==
After his short Senate stint, Graham re-entered the field of global diplomacy. He returned to the United Nations as a mediator for India and Pakistan in the Kashmir dispute, serving in this capacity from 1951 through 1967. He retired from U.N. service in 1967 at the age of 81 and returned to Chapel Hill, after his wife died.

== Death and legacy ==
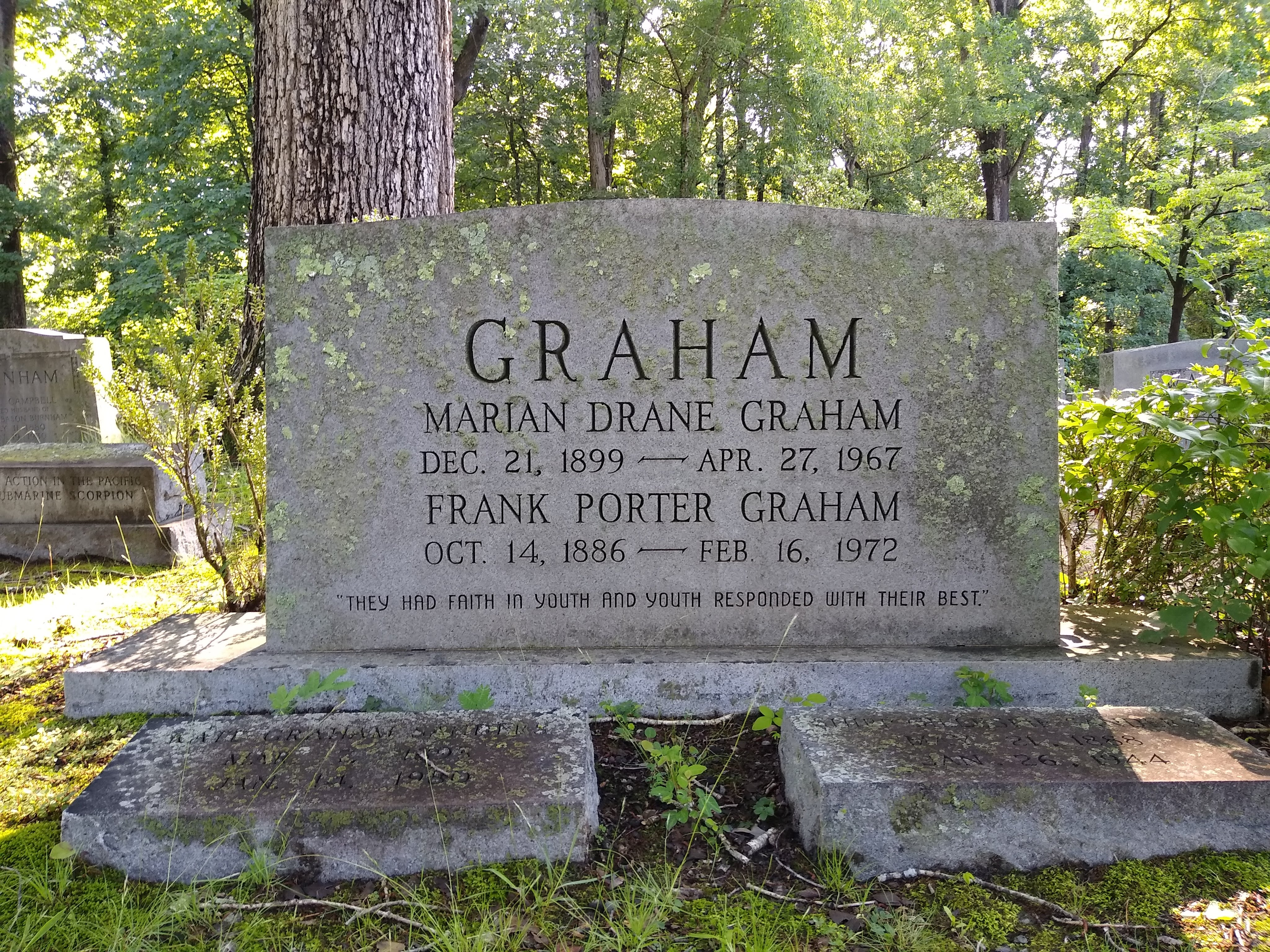
Grave of Frank Porter Graham and Marian Drane Graham at the Old Chapel Hill Cemetery

Graham died in Chapel Hill at the age of 85. He is interred at the Old Chapel Hill Cemetery.

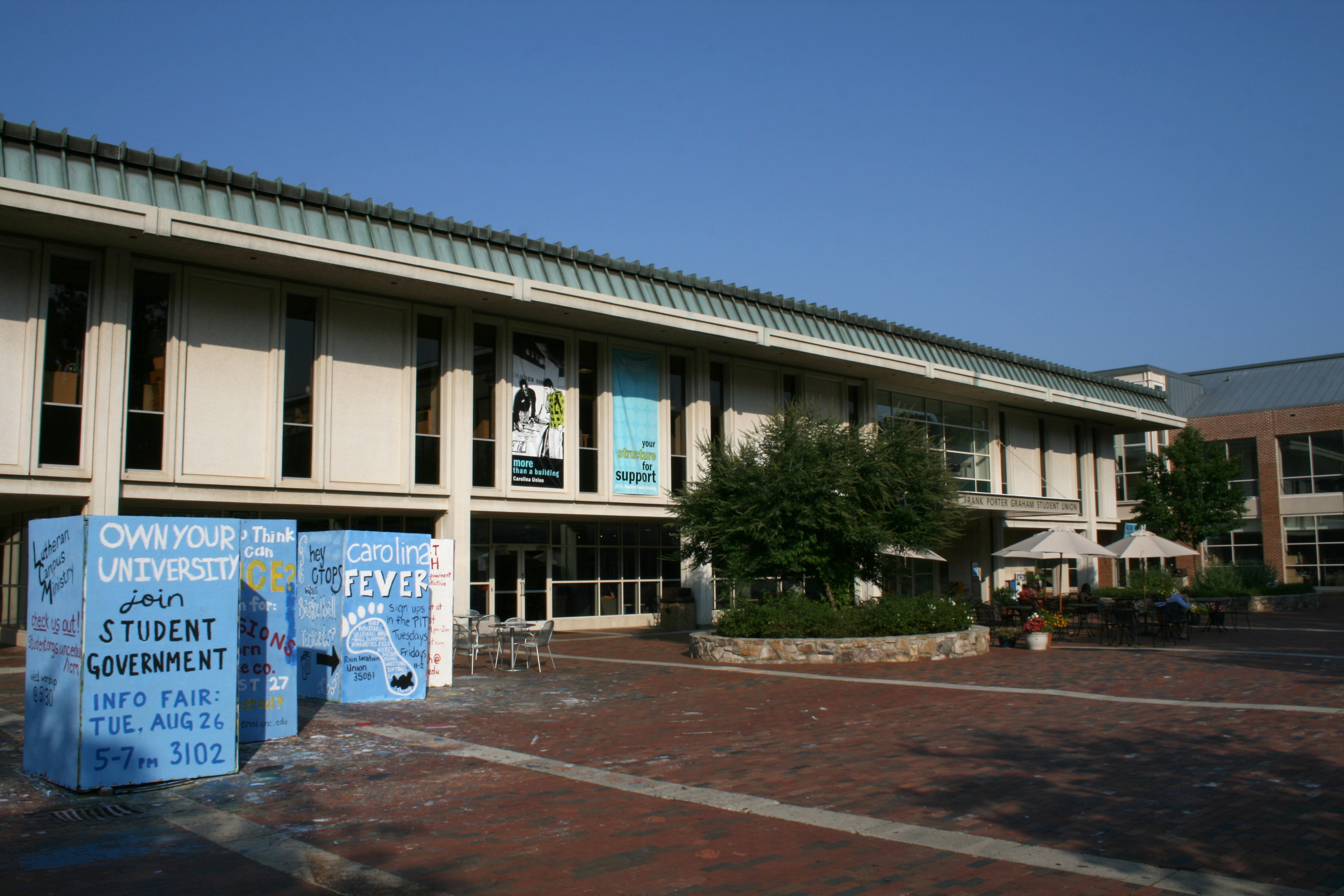
Frank Porter Graham Student Union at UNC

UNC-Chapel Hill's student union is named in Graham's honor. The spacious, multilevel building houses various student services as well as an art gallery, eatery, film auditorium, radio station WXYC, and recreational facilities including twelve bowling lanes in the basement. The UNC-Chapel Hill Graduate School established a Frank Porter Graham Honor Society in 1993 to honor students and faculty who provide "outstanding service" to the university.

The Frank Porter Graham Child Development Institute, founded in 1966, is among the nation's oldest and largest centers of public policy research regarding children and families. The Frank Porter Graham Elementary School in Chapel Hill and the Frank Porter Graham Building on the campus of the University of North Carolina at Greensboro also honor the former senator.

Since 1968, the North Carolina chapter of the ACLU has acknowledged people who work towards the promotion of civil liberties in the state with the Frank Porter Graham Award. Graham's life story was the subject of a 1994 documentary, Dr. Frank: The Life and Times of Frank Porter Graham, narrated by Charles Kuralt.

U.S. Senate
| Preceded by J. Melville Broughton | U.S. senator (Class 2) from North Carolina; 1949–1950; Served alongside: Clyde Roark Hoey | Succeeded by Willis Smith |
