= Robert McCaw =

Robert Gadsden McCaw

51st Lieutenant Governor of South Carolina
- In office December 18, 1864 – May 25, 1865 (Note: Overthrown by Union Army.)
- Governor: Andrew Gordon Magrath
- Preceded by: Plowden Weston
- Succeeded by: William Porter

Personal details
- Born: December 28, 1821
- Died: November 24, 1870 (aged 48)
- Party: Democratic
- Education: University of Virginia
- Profession: planter, soldier, politician

Military service
- Allegiance: Confederate States of America
- Branch/service: Confederate States Army
- Years of service: 1861–1865
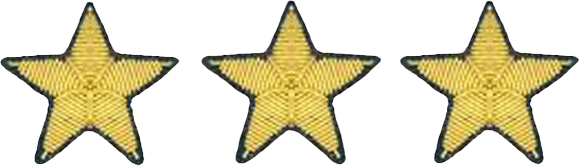
- Rank: Colonel
- Battles/wars: American Civil War

Robert Gadsden McCaw (December 28, 1821 – November 24, 1870) was an American politician and slaveholder. A member of the Democratic Party, he served as the 51st lieutenant governor of South Carolina.

== Biography ==
McCaw studied at the University of Virginia in Charlottesville before later holding approximately 135 slaves in York County, South Carolina.

McCaw served in the South Carolina House of Representatives and two terms in the South Carolina Senate. In 1864, McCaw was elected lieutenant governor, and he held the office until May 1865. After the Confederacy's defeat in the Civil War, South Carolina's governor, Andrew Gordon Magrath, was arrested and removed from office. McCaw did not succeed Magrath as governor because the United States government dissolved the state government of South Carolina, placing the state under the administration of the Second Military District.
