= Ralph H. Scott =

American politician and businessman

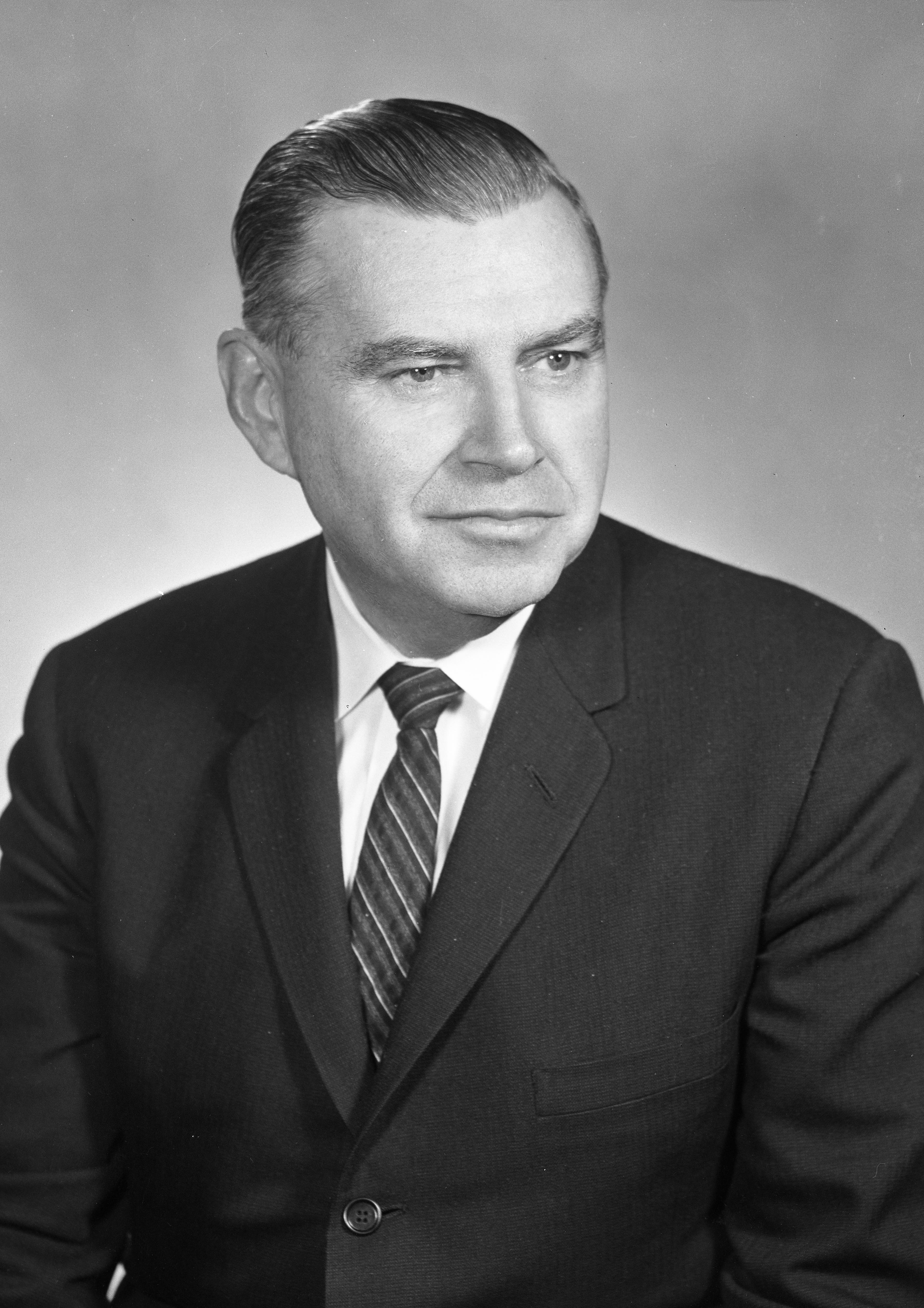
Scott c. 1961

Ralph Henderson Scott (December 12, 1903 – April 2, 1989) was an American politician and businessman.

== Early life ==
Ralph Scott was born on December 12, 1903, near Haw River, North Carolina, United States to Robert Walter Scott and Elizabeth Jessie Hughes Scott. He was the 11th of 14 children, and a younger brother of NC Governor Kerr Scott. In his youth Scott worked on his father's farm and participated in The Corn Club, a predecessor to 4-H.

Scott attended North Carolina State College (now NC State University). In 1923 he acted as captain of the college's cross country team, which won the state championship. When later asked by a journalist why he participated in the sport, he said, "I heard you got better food if you got to the training table. That was the only reason I went out." He graduated in 1924. He married Hazeleene Tate the following year and had three children with her.

== Business career ==
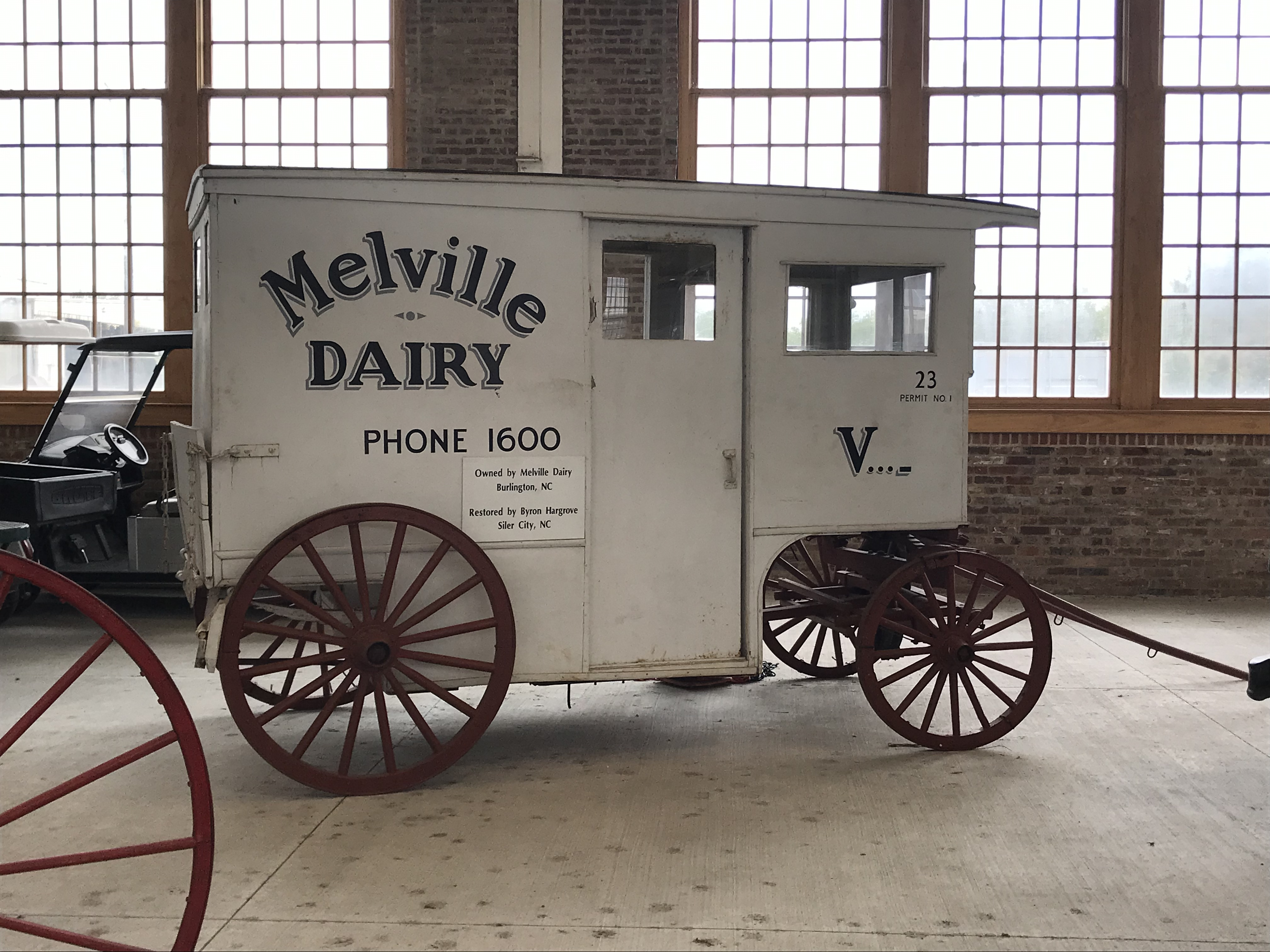
Melville Dairy wagon

In 1927 Scott created Melville Dairy, a milk delivery business based out of a small building on his brother Henry's farm. For the first few years he acted as his company's sole deliveryman while his wife managed its finances. He worked seven days a week, using a Ford Model A to pick up milk from farmers in the mornings before parking in downtown Burlington to make his deliveries on foot. He moved his business to a modern building in Burlington in 1935. In 1967 he sold Melville Dairy to Guilford Dairy, a company cofounded by his brother W. Kerr Scott. He also created a company that manufactured plastic containers and processed aerosol cream, and he served on the boards of directors of an insurance firm, a savings and loan association, and a textile mill. In his later life he turned over management of the plastic and aerosol cream company to two of his sons.

== Political career ==
A devout Christian, Scott's religious beliefs underpinned his political philosophies in support of poor and disabled people. He served on the Alamance County Board of Commissioners from 1944 to 1950. In 1948 while his brother, Kerr Scott, was mulling his chances of running for the office of Governor of North Carolina, Ralph investigated the potential of his candidacy. Kerr was later elected governor, and during his term he would travel back to Alamance County on weekends and discuss politics with Ralph.

Scott won election to a seat representing Alamance and Orange counties in the North Carolina Senate in 1950. Once sworn-in to the Senate in 1951, Scott moved into the Executive Mansion in Raleigh and would visit Alamance County on the weekends with Kerr. Lieutenant Governor Hoyt Patrick Taylor, the presiding officer of the Senate, sent Scott a letter asking for his desired committee assignments. Scott asked to be appointed to committees where he could best aide his brother's agenda, and in response Taylor made him chair of the Penal Institutions Committee. In 1953 Scott introduced a ultimately successfully bill which created the Milk Commission to fix prices of milk to support independent dairy farmers. When visiting his home district on weekends, he often met with constituents to hear their requests and worked to secure government favors upon them, including jobs, paroles, or the paving of roads. After hearing about the problems of a mentally disabled child in his district, he became a leading advocate for mentally disabled children and secured funding for special education. During his time in the Senate he befriended one-term Senator Terry Sanford, and recommended that his brother Kerr tap him as his campaign manager for his 1954 U.S. Senate bid. Kerr won election but died in office, and afterwards Kerr's annual social and political dove hunting gathering was hosted by Ralph on his own farm.

Scott did not seek reelection in 1956 per an agreement to allow the Senate seat he occupied to be filled by an Orange County denizen. After hearing rumors that U.S. Representative Carl T. Durham would retire from his seat in North Carolina's 6th congressional district, Scott declared his candidacy in the Democratic primary. Durham pursued reelection and defeated Scott.

In 1960 Scott was reelected to his Senate seat and supported Sanford's successful campaign to become governor. He supported Sanford's agenda in the legislature, and Sanford appointed him to the Advisory Budget Commission, a body which helped coordinate budget proposals between the executive and legislative branches. Scott frequently visited the governor in his office.

Scott was elected president pro tempore of the Senate at the opening of the 1963 legislative session on February 6. During the 1963 session the North Carolina General Assembly began sitting in the new North Carolina State Legislative Building. Scott, due to his seniority, was assigned an office with a view of the building grounds. When another legislator complain of his own small, windowless office, Scott traded places with him, and kept the smaller office through the rest of his Senate tenure. He became a leading critic of the Speaker Ban Law.

During the Democratic primaries of the 1964 North Carolina gubernatorial election, Scott supported progressive L. Richardson Preyer and frequently criticized conservative candidate Dan K. Moore. His criticism was so intense that his nephew Bob, who was running for the office of Lieutenant Governor and attempting remain neutral in the gubernatorial contest, had to issue a public statement distancing himself from Ralph.

In 1968 Bob Scott was elected Governor of North Carolina. Ralph used his position in the legislature to assist his nephew's agenda, and in returned asked for the governor to help grant favors to his constituents. Ralph's demands were so frequent that Bob once complained that "there is not a soul in jail from Alamance County" due to his interventions. During the 1969 legislative session, many legislators complained of the student unrest and introduced bills to increase penalties for student civil disobedience. Ralph Scott proposed the only bill that was supportive of the students, a measure which would establish their representation on the boards of trustees of state-supported schools. The bill failed to pass.

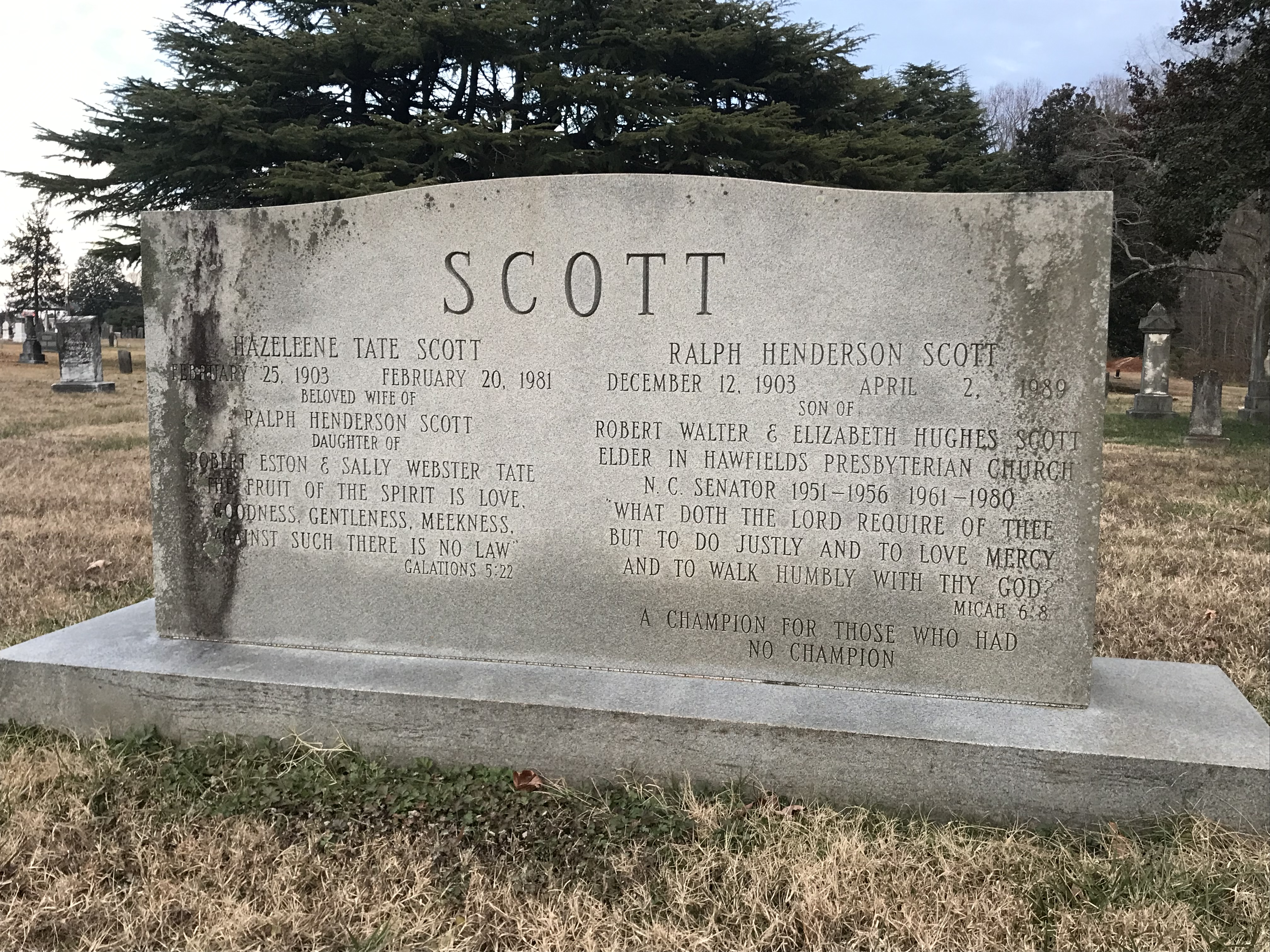
Ralph H. Scott gravestone

Scott was targeted by Republicans for his support of the governor's tobacco tax and narrowly won reelection by 13 votes in 1970. He shrugged aside the close contest, saying, "I got twelve more votes than I needed." In 1975 Scott chaired the Committee on Appropriations. In order to secure money for vocational rehabilitation projects for disabled persons, he appointed a subcommittee on the matter which met once and voted to recommend increased funding. He repeated this recommendation to the Senate and the appropriations were passed.

In 1977 Scott suffered a heart attack. Upon his return to the Senate floor, he said, "Hell is just as crowded as Central Prison. I can't get in." The following year he defeated Republican Cary D. Allred in his bid for reelection. However, Scott's political support in Alamance County continued to decline, as local farmers and mill workers increasingly supported the Republican Party. In 1979 he voted for ratification of the Equal Rights Amendment. Allred challenged Scott again in 1980, accusing him of impropriety for lobbying for the paving of an access road to a Holiday Inn hotel while he held stock in the company. Scott also fainted while attending a local school board meeting, prompting a bystander to call for medical assistance. Allred won the November election with 52% of the vote.

== Later life ==
In his later life Scott suffered from a series of minor strokes. He died on April 2, 1989, at the North Carolina Memorial Hospital in Chapel Hill. His funeral was held three days later and attended by hundreds of people, including many former state officials. Sanford dubbed him "the conscience of the legislature" while former Senator Robert Burren Morgan said that he had wielded as much influence "as any single individual ever in the state, including governors." Scott had prepared remarks to be read at his funeral, and they contained a story of an unnamed black tenant farmer who had voted in 1903 in Haw River to support a bond referendum, allowing it to succeed by one vote to establish funding for a local school. His gravestone's epitaph read, "A champion for those who had no champion."

== Works cited ==
- Christensen, Rob (2019). The Rise and Fall of the Branchhead Boys: North Carolina's Scott Family and the Era of Progressive Politics. Chapel Hill: The University of North Carolina Press. ISBN 9781469651057.
- Covington, Howard E. Jr; Ellis, Marion A. (1999). Terry Sanford: Politics, Progress, and Outrageous Ambitions. Durham: Duke University Press. ISBN 9780822323563.
- Speck, Jean (1990). The Gentleman from Haw River. Raleigh: Edwards & Broughton Co. OCLC 23152235.
