= 1867 Maryland gubernatorial election =

- November 5, 1867
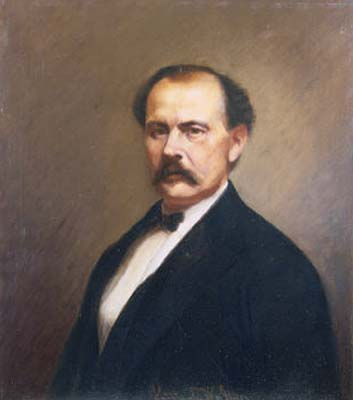

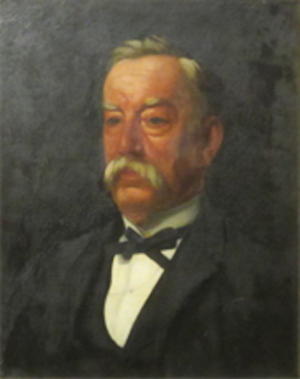
Nominee	Oden Bowie	Hugh Lennox Bond
Party	Democratic	Republican
Popular vote	63,694	22,050
Percentage	74.28%	25.72%
- County results Bowie: 50–60% 60–70% 70–80% 80–90% 90–100%
Governor before election
Thomas Swann
Union
Elected Governor
Oden Bowie
Democratic

The 1867 Maryland gubernatorial election took place on November 5, 1867. Incumbent Governor Thomas Swann did not run for re-election. (Note: During his term of office, Swann joined the Democratic Party.)

Democratic Party candidate Oden Bowie defeated Republican candidate Hugh Lennox Bond.

Bowie took his oath of office on January 8, 1868, but by a provision of the 1867 State Constitution, he did not actually become Governor until January 13, 1869.

== Results ==
1867 Maryland gubernatorial election (Note: Some sources record the result as Bowie 63,602, Bond 21,890.)
Party	Candidate	Votes	%	±%
Democratic	Oden Bowie	63,694	74.28%	
Republican	Hugh Lennox Bond	22,050	25.72%	
Majority		41,644	48.56%	
Turnout		85,744	100.00%	
Democratic gain from Union		Swing		
