= Milledge Luke Bonham =

American politician (1813–1890)

Milledge Bonham
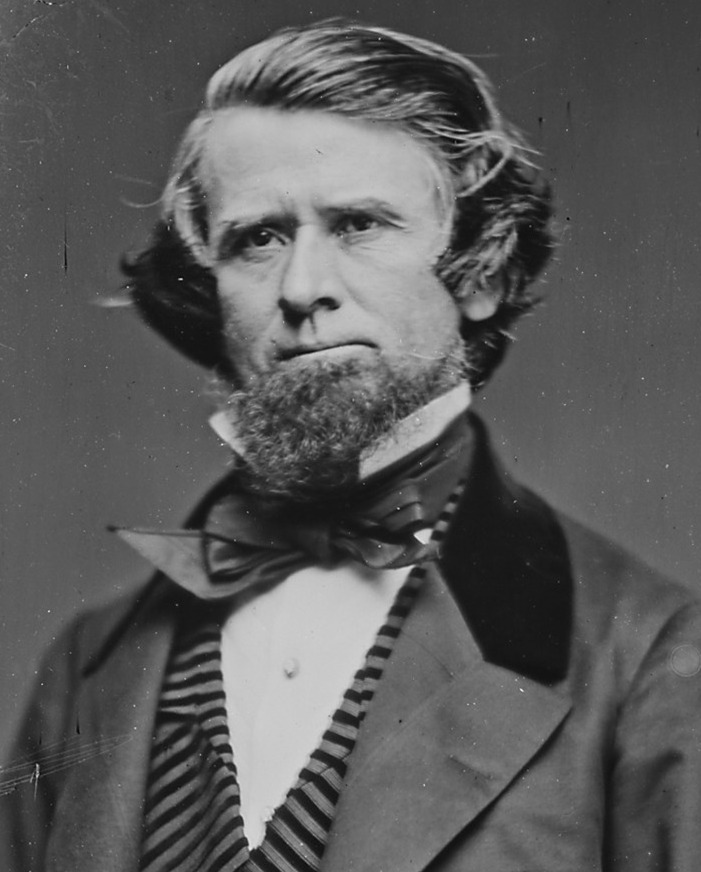
- 1860s portrait of Bonham, by Mathew Brady

Member of the South Carolina House of Representatives from Edgefield County
- In office November 27, 1865 – April 16, 1868

70th Governor of South Carolina
- In office December 18, 1862 – December 18, 1864
- Lieutenant: Plowden Weston
- Preceded by: Francis Wilkinson Pickens
- Succeeded by: Andrew Gordon Magrath

Member of the Confederate House of Representatives from South Carolina's 4th District
- In office February 18, 1862 – January 17, 1863
- Preceded by: Position established
- Succeeded by: William Dunlap Simpson

Member of the U.S. House of Representatives from South Carolina's 4th district
- In office March 4, 1857 – December 21, 1860
- Preceded by: Preston S. Brooks
- Succeeded by: James H. Goss (1868)

Member of the South Carolina House of Representatives from Edgefield district
- In office November 23, 1840 – November 25, 1844

Personal details
- Born: Milledge Luke Bonham; December 25, 1813 Redbank, South Carolina, US
- Died: August 27, 1890 (aged 76) White Sulphur Springs, North Carolina, US
- Resting place: Elmwood Cemetery, Columbia

Military service
- Allegiance: United States; Confederate States
- Branch/service: US Army; Confederate States Army
- Years of service: 1836, 1847–1848 (USA); 1861–1862, 1865 (CSA)
- Rank: Colonel (USA); Major General (Militia); Brigadier General (CSA)
- Commands: 12th U.S. Infantry; 1st Brigade, Confederate; Army of the Potomac; Bonham's Cavalry Brigade
- Battles/wars: Seminole War; Mexican–American War; American Civil War; First Battle of Manassas

Milledge Luke Bonham (December 25, 1813 – August 27, 1890) was an American politician and U.S. representative. He was later the 70th governor of South Carolina from 1862 until 1864, and a Confederate General during the American Civil War.

== Early life and career ==
Bonham was born near Redbank (now Saluda), South Carolina, the son of Maryland native Capt. James Bonham and Sophie Smith Bonham, the niece of Capt. James Butler, who was the head of an illustrious South Carolina family. Milledge was a first cousin once removed of Andrew Pickens Butler. He was a descendant of an Englishman named Thomas Butler, who arrived to the American colonies in the 1600s.

He attended private schools in the Edgefield District and at Abbeville. Bonham graduated with honors from South Carolina College at Columbia in 1834, and served as Captain and adjutant general of the South Carolina Brigade in the Seminole War in Florida in 1836. That same year, his older brother James Butler Bonham died at the Battle of the Alamo.

Bonham studied law and was admitted to the bar, in 1837, and commenced practice in Edgefield.

=== Mexican-American War ===
During the Mexican–American War, he was lieutenant colonel (from March 1847) and colonel (from August 1847) of the 12th US Infantry Regiment. Two other members of his regiment, Major Maxcy Gregg and Captain Abner Monroe Perrin, would also become generals in the Civil War. After he returned home, Bonham was the major general of the South Carolina Militia. Entering politics, he served in the state house of representatives from 1840 to 1844. He married Ann Patience Griffin on November 13, 1845.

=== Congress ===
Bonham was solicitor of the southern circuit of South Carolina from 1848 to 1857, and was then elected as a Democrat to the Thirty-fifth United States Congress (succeeding his cousin, Preston Smith Brooks) and the Thirty-sixth United States Congress, and served from March 4, 1857, until withdrawing on December 21, 1860 following South Carolina's secession from the Union.

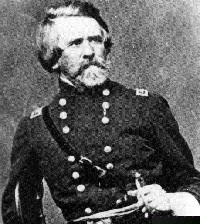
Gen. Milledge Luke Bonham

== Civil War ==
Like many of his fellow South Carolina slaveholders, Burt supported the secession of South Carolina from the United States following the election of Abraham Lincoln as US President in 1860. South Carolina was the first state to secede, and it joined with other slaveholding states to form the Confederate States of America in February 1861.

Bonham was appointed major general and commander of the Army of South Carolina by Gov. Francis W. Pickens in February 1861. He was then appointed brigadier general in the Confederate Army on April 19, 1861, and commanded the First Brigade of the Confederate "Army of the Potomac" under P.G.T. Beauregard. He fought in the First Battle of Manassas, leading his brigade as well as two artillery batteries and six companies of cavalry in the defense of Mitchell's Ford on Bull Run.

He resigned his army commission January 27, 1862, to enter the Confederate Congress, representing South Carolina from February 18 until he was elected governor later that year. In Congress, Bonham focused on military matters and tried to reserve the ability of states to maintain more control over their own manpower. This was a major issue for South Carolina and other Confederate states, as supplying most of their men to the army left their home front dangerously exposed.

== Governor of South Carolina ==
On December 17, 1862, the South Carolina General Assembly elected Bonham as governor (unlike most states, South Carolina's governor was not popularly elected at that time). He left Congress and took up his new office on December 18. At this time military manpower was a major issue. General P.G.T. Beauregard, tasked with the defense of the state, estimated that 30,000 troops would be needed to guard South Carolina against Union forces, but only 10,000 were available in the area. Most of South Carolina's volunteer forces were away fighting in other states, and the age range of younger and older men who would normally be part of the state's militia force were now subject to conscription into the Confederate Army. Union forces began capturing South Carolina's sea islands, and made an attempt to retake Fort Sumter in September, 1863. When the attack on the fort in Charleston harbor failed, Union gunboats shelled the city, continuing the bombardment into the following year.

During his term, the General Assembly enacted a prohibition against distilling to save grains for food, and Bonham urged that more land be used to grow crops instead of cotton to increase the supply of food in the state. Governor Bonham also faced problems from slaveholders who resented the state government and the Confederate military impressing slaves to provide forced labor for building fortifications.

By late 1864, it was becoming obvious that South Carolina would be vulnerable to invasion by land following Union General William T. Sherman's successes in neighboring Georgia. In his final message to the state legislature, Bonham warned of the impending threat and urged every citizen in the state to contribute to the war effort.

His term of office expired in December, 1864, and Bonham rejoined the Confederate Army as brigadier general of cavalry. He saw action during the Carolinas Campaign in early 1865 before Confederate forces in the Carolinas surrendered in April, 1865.

== Postbellum activities ==
Bonham resumed the practice of law in Edgefield and engaged in planting after the war. He owned an insurance business in Edgefield and in Atlanta, Georgia, from 1865 to 1878. Returning to politics, Bonham was again a member of the South Carolina House of Representatives from 1865 to 1867 and a delegate to the Democratic National Convention in 1868. In the 1870s, Bonham took part in Red Shirt activities which used terror and intimidation tactics to restore Democratic rule in South Carolina. As a reward, he was appointed state railroad commissioner in 1878 and served until his death in 1890 at White Sulphur Springs, North Carolina. He was buried in Elmwood Cemetery in Columbia.

== Dates of rank ==
- Major General (South Carolina Militia), February 10, 1861
- Brigadier General, April 23, 1861
- Brigadier General, February 20, 1865

== See also ==
- List of American Civil War Generals (Confederate)
- Bonham House
- Milledge Lipscomb Bonham, his son

Confederate States House of Representatives
Preceded by Position created	Member of the Confederate House of Representatives from South Carolina's 4th Congressional District; 1862–1862	Succeeded by William Dunlap Simpson
U.S. House of Representatives
Preceded by Preston Brooks	Member of the U.S. House of Representatives from South Carolina's 4th congressional district 1857–1860	Succeeded by James H. Goss
Political offices
Preceded by Francis Wilkinson Pickens	Governor of South Carolina; 1862–1864	Succeeded by Andrew Gordon Magrath
