= Judge Bryant =

Judge Bryant may refer to:

- David Ezekiel Bryant (1849–1910), judge of the United States District Court for the Eastern District of Texas
- Ed Bryant (born 1948), magistrate judge of the United States District Court for the Western District of Tennessee
- Frederick Howard Bryant (1877–1945), judge of the United States District Court for the Northern District of New York
- Randolph Bryant (1893–1951), judge of the United States District Court for the Eastern District of Texas
- Vanessa Lynne Bryant (born 1954), judge of the United States District Court for the District of Connecticut
- William B. Bryant (1911–2005), judge of the United States District Court for the District of Columbia

== See also ==
- Diana Bryant (born 1947), chief justice of the Family Court of Australia
- Judge Bryan (disambiguation)
