= Charles Henry Simonton =

American judge (1829–1904)

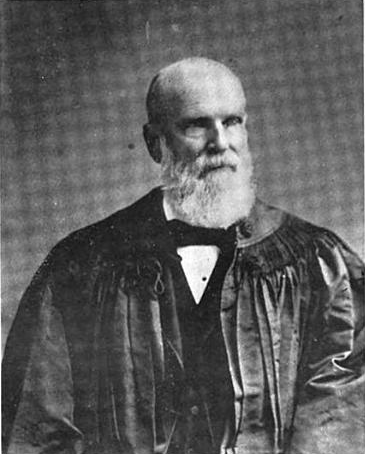

Judge of the United States Court of Appeals for the Fourth Circuit
- In office December 19, 1893 – April 25, 1904
- Appointed by: Grover Cleveland
- Preceded by: Hugh Lennox Bond
- Succeeded by: Jeter Connelly Pritchard

Judge of the United States Circuit Courts for the Fourth Circuit
- In office December 19, 1893 – April 25, 1904
- Appointed by: Grover Cleveland
- Preceded by: Hugh Lennox Bond
- Succeeded by: Jeter Connelly Pritchard

Judge of the United States District Court for the District of South Carolina
- In office September 3, 1886 – December 28, 1893
- Appointed by: Grover Cleveland
- Preceded by: George Seabrook Bryan
- Succeeded by: William H. Brawley

Member of the South Carolina House of Representatives
- In office 1858–1862; 1865–1866; 1877–1886

Personal details
- Born: Charles Henry Simonton; July 11, 1829 Charleston, South Carolina
- Died: April 25, 1904 (aged 74) Philadelphia, Pennsylvania
- Education: University of South Carolina read law

Charles Henry Simonton (July 11, 1829 – April 25, 1904) was a United States circuit judge of the United States Court of Appeals for the Fourth Circuit and of the United States Circuit Courts for the Fourth Circuit and previously was a United States district judge of the United States District Court for the District of South Carolina.

== Education and career ==
Born on July 11, 1829, in Charleston, South Carolina, Simonton graduated from South Carolina College (now the University of South Carolina) in 1849. He read law in 1851. He entered private practice in Charleston from 1851 to 1886. He was an assistant clerk for the South Carolina House of Representatives from 1851 to 1852. He was a member of the South Carolina House of Representatives from 1858 to 1862. He was a Colonel in the Confederate States Army from 1861 to 1865. He was a member of the South Carolina House of Representatives from 1865 to 1866, and from 1877 to 1886.

== Federal judicial service ==
Simonton received a recess appointment from President Grover Cleveland on September 3, 1886, to a seat on the United States District Court for the District of South Carolina vacated by Judge George Seabrook Bryan. He was nominated to the same position by President Cleveland on December 9, 1886. He was confirmed by the United States Senate on January 13, 1887, and received his commission the same day. His service terminated on December 28, 1893, due to his elevation to the Fourth Circuit.

Simonton was nominated by President Cleveland on December 11, 1893, to a joint seat on the United States Court of Appeals for the Fourth Circuit and the United States Circuit Courts for the Fourth Circuit vacated by Judge Hugh Lennox Bond. He was confirmed by the Senate on December 19, 1893, and received his commission the same day. He died on April 25, 1904, in Philadelphia, Pennsylvania.

== Sources ==
- Memorial proceedings on the Life and Character of Charles Henry Simonton, United States Circuit Court of Appeals, Richmond VA, May 10, 1904

Legal offices
| Preceded by George Seabrook Bryan | Judge of the United States District Court for the District of South Carolina; 1886–1893 | Succeeded by William H. Brawley |
| Preceded by Hugh Lennox Bond | Judge of the United States Circuit Courts for the Fourth Circuit; 1893–1904 | Succeeded by Jeter Connelly Pritchard |
| Preceded by Hugh Lennox Bond | Judge of the United States Court of Appeals for the Fourth Circuit; 1893–1904 | Succeeded by Jeter Connelly Pritchard |
