= W. Kerr Scott =

American politician (1896–1958)

William Kerr Scott
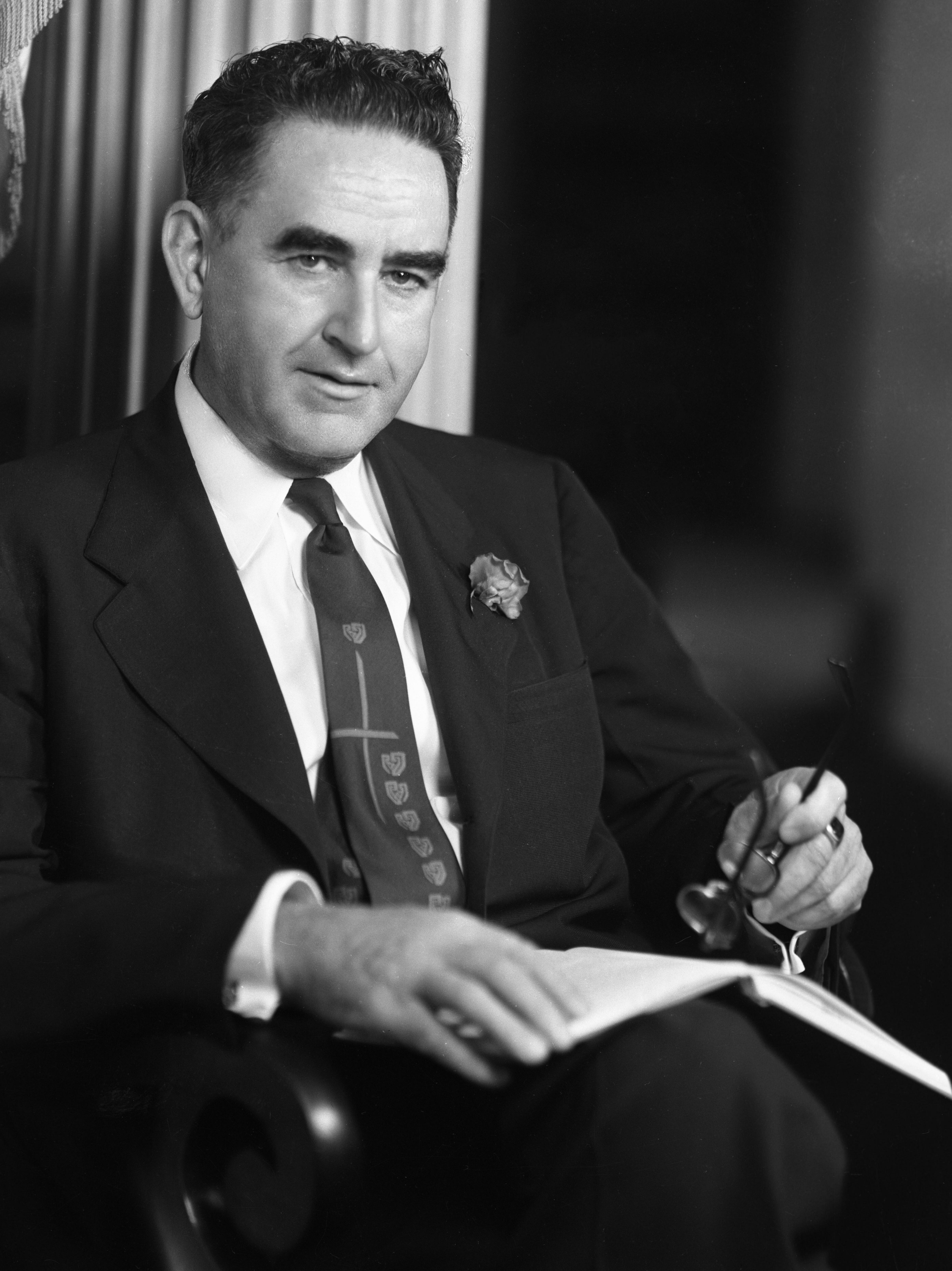
- Scott in 1951

United States Senator from North Carolina
- In office November 29, 1954 – April 16, 1958
- Preceded by: Alton Lennon
- Succeeded by: B. Everett Jordan

62nd Governor of North Carolina
- In office January 6, 1949 – January 8, 1953
- Lieutenant: Hoyt Patrick Taylor
- Preceded by: R. Gregg Cherry
- Succeeded by: William B. Umstead

10th North Carolina Commissioner of Agriculture
- In office 1937–1948
- Governor: Clyde R. Hoey; J. Melville Broughton; R. Gregg Cherry
- Preceded by: William A. Graham III
- Succeeded by: David S. Coltrane

Personal details
- Born: April 17, 1896 Haw River, North Carolina, U.S.
- Died: April 16, 1958 (aged 61) Burlington, North Carolina, U.S.
- Party: Democratic
- Spouse: Mary Elizabeth White
- Parent: Robert W. Scott (father)
- Education: North Carolina State University (BS)
- Profession: Agriculture

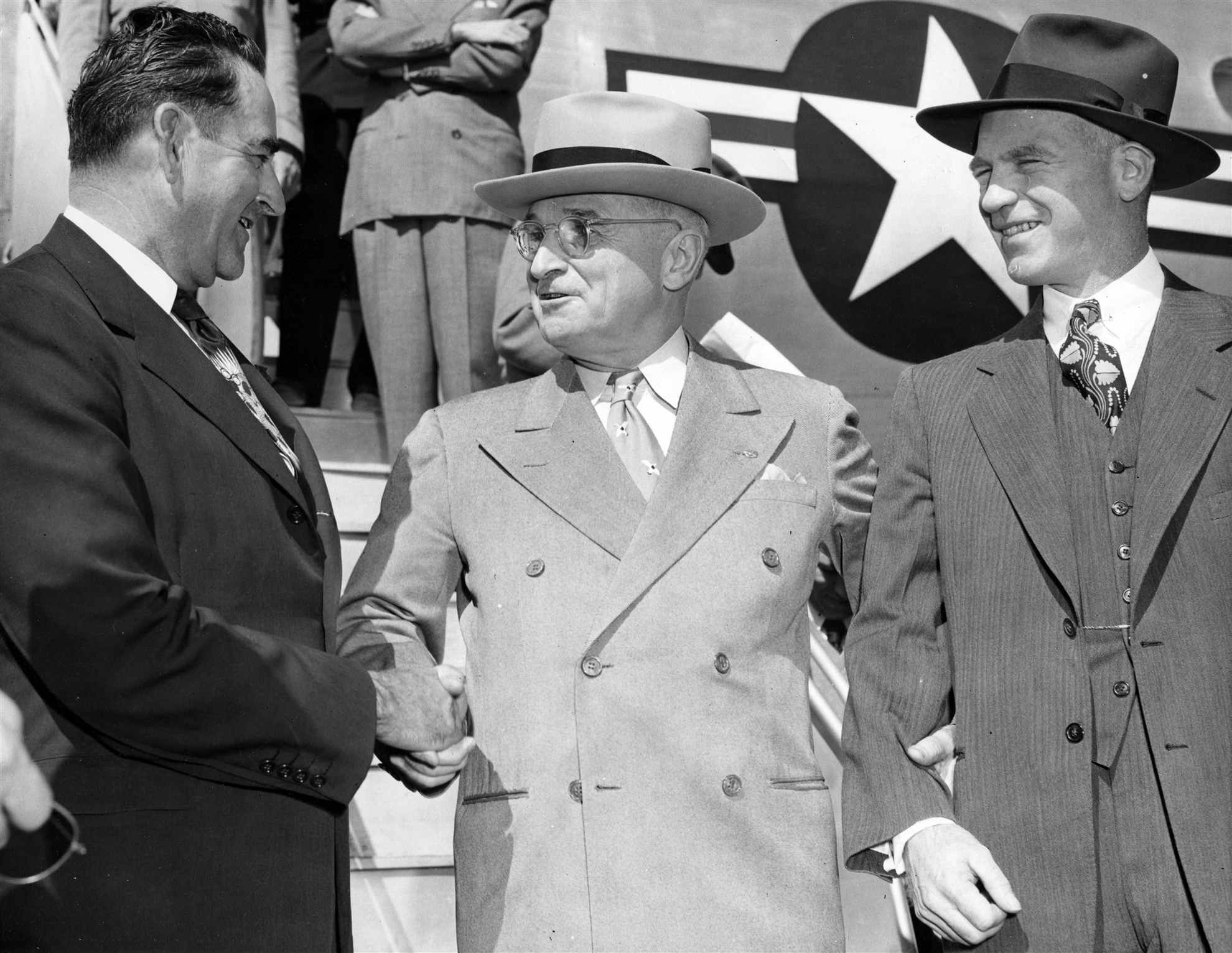
Scott (left) in 1951, with Harry S. Truman and Gordon Gray.

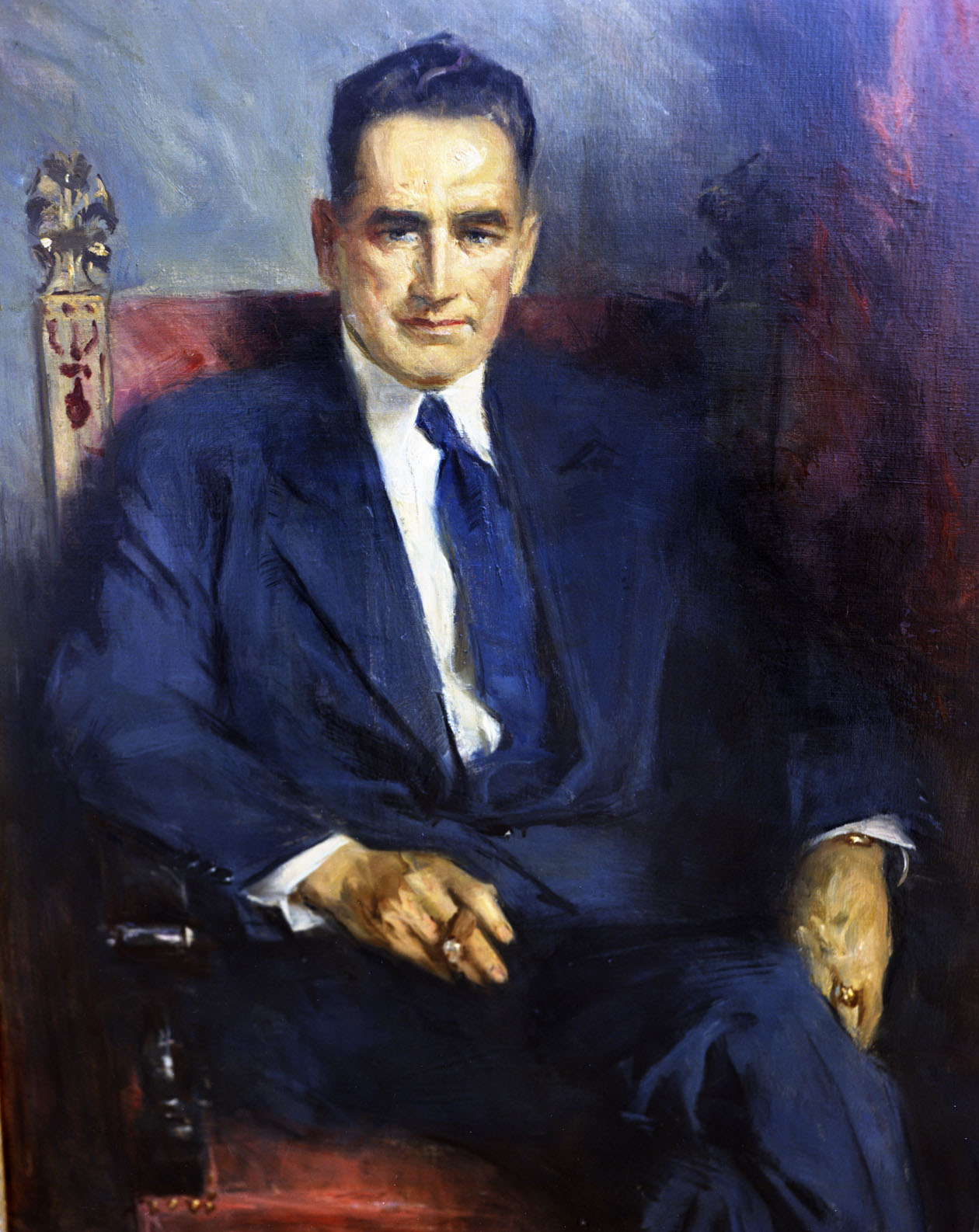
Portrait as governor painted by Howard Chandler Christy.

William Kerr Scott (April 17, 1896 – April 16, 1958) was an American politician. A member of the Democratic Party, he was the 62nd governor of North Carolina from 1949 until 1953, and a United States senator from North Carolina from 1954 until 1958.

A native of Alamance County, North Carolina, and a farmer by training, Scott was a lifelong advocate for agricultural issues and became known in his home state as "the Squire of Haw River." He was elected as the state's commissioner of agriculture, but resigned that post to run for governor in 1948. His followers, popularly known as "Branchhead Boys," fervently supported Scott in all his campaigns and remained a force in North Carolina politics for more than a decade following his death.

== Early life ==
Scott was born in 1896, the son of Robert W. Scott and Lizzie Scott. He graduated from Hawfields High School in 1913 and subsequently enrolled in the North Carolina College of Agriculture and Mechanic Arts (now NC State University), graduating in 1917 with a Bachelor of Science in agriculture. He performed well as a student there, while also running track and volunteering for the Young Men's Christian Association. After graduating he briefly worked as an emergency food production agent for the United States Department of Agriculture. After the United States entered World War I, he enlisted as a private in the United States Army. For four months he trained with field artillery at Camp Taylor in Kentucky. Shortly before he was due to enroll in officer training school, the war ended and he was discharged from service.

Kerr was the only child in his family who had political ambitions. His father advised him that he should acquire land and develop his agricultural enterprise to ensure that when he sought public office he could campaign without fear of losing his job due to political reprisal. Thus, after he was discharged from the army he borrowed $4,000 from his father and bought 224 acres of land. He cleared it and raised sheep and cattle.

== Career ==
Scott was inaugurated as Governor of North Carolina on January 6, 1949. As governor, Scott created the "Go Forward" program with approval from the state legislature in 1949. He also signed a $200 million rural road building program, leading to nearly 15,000 additional miles of paved road in the state. Immediately following his term as governor, he represented North Carolina in the United States Senate from 1954 to 1958. His son, Bob Scott served as governor from 1969 to 1973, and his granddaughter, Meg Scott Phipps served as North Carolina Commissioner of Agriculture from 2001 to 2003.

Relative to other Southern Democrats, Scott was a moderate regarding racial issues during his time as governor. While he supported segregation, he appointed the first black member of the North Carolina Board of Education, Dr. Harold Trigg, and nominated University of North Carolina President Frank Porter Graham to fill a vacant United States Senate seat in 1949. Graham was regarded as one of the most racially and generally progressive figures in the South, and became victimized by pernicious attacks concerning his views on race relations when he campaigned the following year to maintain his senate seat. In an effort to defend Graham, Scott lent the full weight of his political organization to him and assiduously campaigned across North Carolina. Despite intervention from Scott, President Harry Truman, U.S. House Speaker Sam Rayburn, and others, Graham was defeated by conservative lawyer Willis Smith for the Democratic Party's nomination. The tenor of Willis Smith's campaign was considered so offensive that Scott's wife, First Lady Mary White Scott, refused to shake the senator-elect's hand at an Executive Mansion reception. He was succeeded as governor by William B. Umstead on January 8, 1953.

Four years later, when Scott elected to run for the same U.S. Senate seat which had been contested by Graham, he was queried by a local reporter about how his campaign would respond to the race-baiting strategies that are imputed with the loss of his appointee. To this, he is said to have grinned and replied, "I'll handle it, son. I'm not as good a Christian as Frank Porter Graham."

Scott attained the Senate seat and served until he died of a heart attack in 1958. He was sworn in on November 29, 1954, instead of the following January, as he was filling a vacant seat. In December he voted to censure Senator Joseph McCarthy. As senator, Scott moved away from his previously moderate views on race. He was a signatory of the Southern Manifesto, objecting to the U.S. Supreme Court's decision in Brown v. Board of Education that state laws establishing separate public schools for black and white students are unconstitutional. Reacting directly to the Brown ruling, Kerr expressed his wish that the Supreme Court "would reaffirm its own historic decisions approving equal, but separate, school facilities." He added, "I have always...been opposed to Negro and white children going to school together." Scott also opposed the Civil Rights Act of 1957 and President Eisenhower's decision to send troops to escort black students to Little Rock Central High School.

Scott died in Burlington, North Carolina on April 16, 1958, and is buried in Hawfields Presbyterian Church Cemetery in Mebane, North Carolina. His son, Robert Scott, was also elected governor in the 1960s.

The W. Kerr Scott Dam and Reservoir in Wilkes County, North Carolina are named in honor of the governor. While Senator, he greatly assisted in obtaining approval for construction of the dam and reservoir. In addition, a residence hall is named in his memory on the campus of East Carolina University and a technology building on the campus of Appalachian State University is named for him.

His home and farm, the Kerr Scott Farm, was added to the National Register of Historic Places in 1987.

== See also ==
- List of members of the United States Congress who died in office (1950–1999)

== Citations ==
Party political offices
Preceded by William A. Graham III	Democratic nominee for North Carolina Commissioner of Agriculture; 1936, 1940, 1944	Succeeded by David S. Coltrane
Preceded by R. Gregg Cherry	Democratic nominee for Governor of North Carolina; 1948	Succeeded by William B. Umstead
Preceded by Willis Smith	Democratic nominee for U.S. Senator from North Carolina (Class 2); 1954	Succeeded by B. Everett Jordan
Political offices
Preceded by R. Gregg Cherry	Governor of North Carolina; 1949–1953	Succeeded by William B. Umstead
Preceded by William A. Graham III	10th North Carolina Commissioner of Agriculture; 1937–1948	Succeeded by David S. Coltrane
U.S. Senate
Preceded by Alton Asa Lennon	U.S. senator (Class 2) from North Carolina; 1954–1958; Served alongside: Sam Ervin	Succeeded by Benjamin Everett Jordan
