= Charles B. Mashburn =

American lawyer and politician

Charles B. Mashburn (? – December 14, 1932) was an American lawyer and state legislator in North Carolina. He was a Republican. Mashburn had been the mayor of Marshall, North Carolina, several times. Mashburn was elected to the North Carolina House of Representatives in 1912 representing the 35th district, with the session starting January 8, 1913, and being one of only three Republicans.

He died December 14, 1932, after getting influenza and then pneumonia.
