= George Seabrook Bryan =

American judge

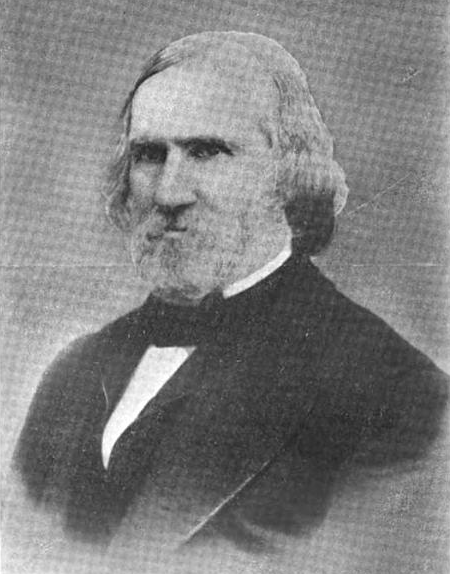

Judge of the United States District Court for the District of South Carolina
- In office March 12, 1866 – September 1, 1886
- Appointed by: Andrew Johnson
- Preceded by: Andrew Gordon Magrath
- Succeeded by: Charles Henry Simonton

Personal details
- Born: George Seabrook Bryan; May 22, 1809 Charleston, South Carolina
- Died: September 28, 1905 (aged 96) Flat Rock, North Carolina
- Education: read law

George Seabrook Bryan (May 22, 1809 – September 28, 1905) was a United States district judge of the United States District Court for the District of South Carolina.

== Education and career ==
Born in Charleston, South Carolina, Bryan read law to enter the bar.

== Federal judicial service ==
On February 9, 1866, Bryan was nominated by President Andrew Johnson to a seat on the United States District Court for the District of South Carolina vacated by Judge Andrew Gordon Magrath. Bryan was confirmed by the United States Senate on March 12, 1866, and received his commission the same day. Bryan's service was terminated on September 1, 1886, due to his retirement.

== Death ==
Bryan died on September 28, 1905, in Flat Rock, Henderson County, North Carolina.

== Sources ==
Legal offices
| Preceded by Andrew Gordon Magrath | Judge of the United States District Court for the District of South Carolina; 1866–1886 | Succeeded by Charles Henry Simonton |
