= Benjamin Franklin Perry =

American politician (1805–1886)

Benjamin Perry
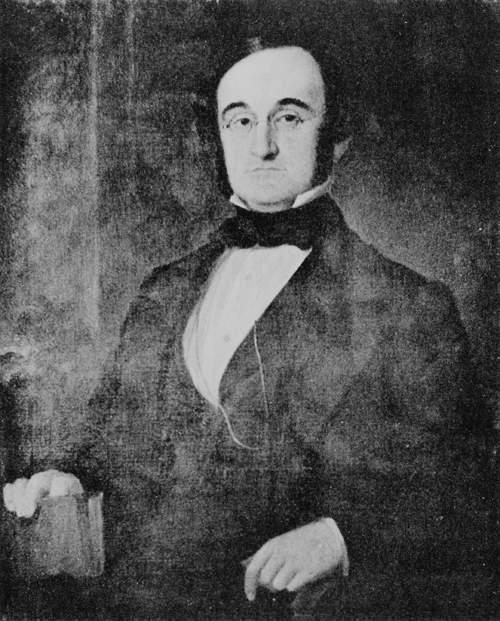

United States Senator-elect from South Carolina
- In office Not seated
- Preceded by: James Chesnut; James Hammond
- Succeeded by: Thomas Robertson; Frederick Sawyer

72nd Governor of South Carolina
- In office June 30, 1865 – November 29, 1865
- Appointed by: Andrew Johnson
- Preceded by: Second Military District (military government); Andrew Gordon Magrath
- Succeeded by: James Orr

Personal details
- Born: Benjamin Franklin Perry; November 20, 1805 Pickens District, South Carolina, U.S. (now South Carolina)
- Died: December 3, 1886 (aged 81) Greenville, South Carolina, U.S.
- Party: Democratic

Benjamin Franklin Perry (November 20, 1805 – December 3, 1886) was the 72nd governor of South Carolina, appointed by U.S. President Andrew Johnson in 1865 after the end of the American Civil War.

== Early life and career ==
Perry was born in Pickens District and educated at preparatory schools in Asheville, North Carolina. He was admitted to the South Carolina bar in 1827, but pursued journalism and became the editor of the Greenville Mountaineer in 1832. The paper was adamantly against nullification and Perry was able to parlay his influence by being elected as a delegate to both the Union Convention and the Nullification Convention. Turner Bynum, who was editor of the pro-Calhoun Greenville Sentinel newspaper, met Perry in a duel. The duel was staged on an island in the Tugaloo River near Hatton's Ford on August 17, 1832. Perry fatally wounded Bynum who died that night.

== Political career ==
In 1836, Perry was elected to the South Carolina House of Representatives and served for six years until 1842, he had lost to Warren R. Davis in 1834. He gained election to the South Carolina Senate in 1844, but returned to the House of Representatives in 1849 and remained a member until 1860. As the secession movement was sweeping the state in the years prior to the Civil War, Perry founded The Southern Patriot in 1851 to counter and spread a unionist message. Even though Perry was adamantly against secession, he embraced the state when it did secede and rallied the residents in the Upstate in favor of the Confederate cause. He was again elected to the House of Representatives in 1862 and served until being appointed as a Confederate States District Judge in 1864.

On June 30, 1865, U.S. President Andrew Johnson appointed Perry as the provisional Governor of South Carolina, because of the strong unionist views he had held prior to the war. Perry was directed by the president to enroll voters and to lead the state in the writing of a new state constitution. The delegates at the constitutional convention largely followed Perry's guidelines for the constitution, but they strayed by adopting the black codes to prevent black suffrage. President Johnson, as well as several leading statesmen of South Carolina, urged the granting of suffrage to blacks while also including a property qualification clause. A property qualification would essentially disenfranchise all blacks without giving the appearance of impropriety towards blacks and prevent the imposition of harsh terms by the Radical Republicans.

Benjamin Franklin Perry said in 1865, "The African ... has been in all ages, a savage or a slave. God created him inferior to the white man in form, color, and intellect, and no legislation or culture can make him his equal... His hair, his form and features will not compete with the caucasian race, and it is in vain to think of elevating him to the dignity of the white man. God created differences between the two races, and nothing can make him equal".

== Later life ==
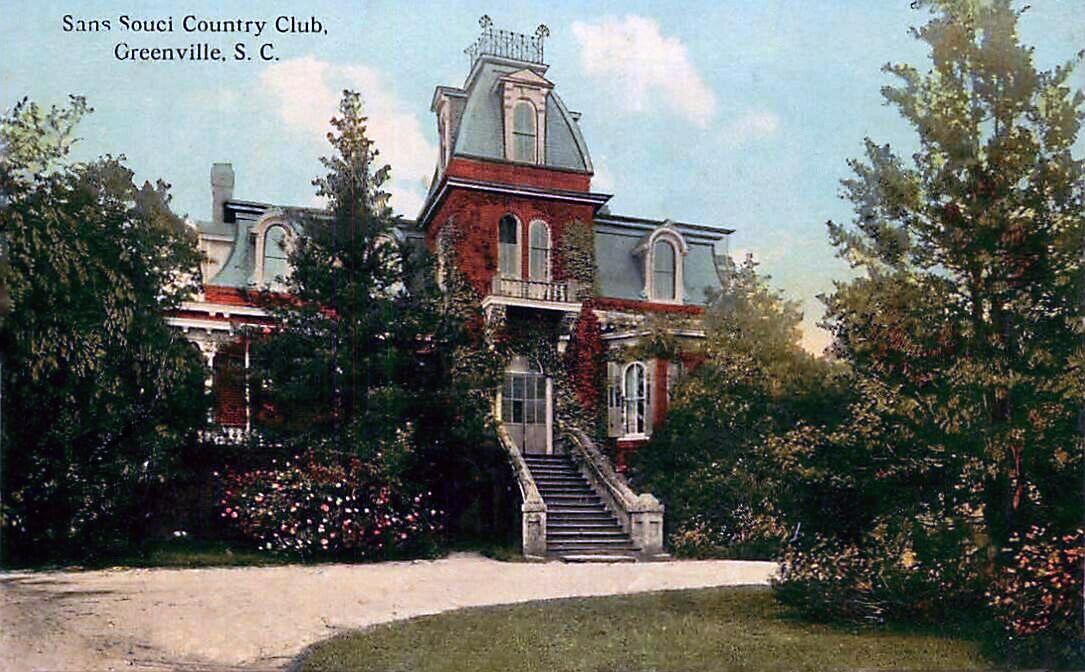
Sans Souci, former home of Gov. Perry.

Upon the completion of the constitution, elections were called and Perry sought election to the U.S. Senate. He was elected along with John Lawrence Manning, but the Radical Republicans in charge of Congress refused to seat them. In 1872, he unsuccessfully ran for the 4th congressional district House seat against Republican Alexander S. Wallace. His son, William Hayne Perry, did successfully gain election to the House and was a member from 1885 to 1891. Perry died in Greenville on December 3, 1886, and was interred at Christ Church Episcopal Cemetery.

Political offices
Preceded by Andrew Magrath	Governor of South Carolina; 1865	Succeeded by James Orr
U.S. Senate
Preceded by James Chesnut; James Hammond	U.S. Senator-elect from South Carolina; 1866; Served alongside: John Manning (elect)	Succeeded by Thomas Robertson; Frederick Sawyer
