= Willis Smith =

American politician (1887–1953)

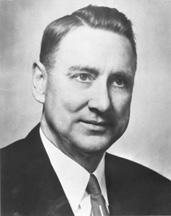

United States Senator from North Carolina
- In office November 27, 1950 – June 26, 1953
- Preceded by: Frank P. Graham
- Succeeded by: Alton Lennon

Member of the North Carolina House of Representatives
- In office 1927-1932

Personal details
- Born: December 19, 1887 Norfolk, Virginia, U.S.
- Died: June 26, 1953 (aged 65) Bethesda, Maryland, U.S.
- Resting place: Historic Oakwood Cemetery, Raleigh, North Carolina
- Party: Democratic
- Education: Trinity College
- Profession: Law

Willis Smith (December 19, 1887 – June 26, 1953) was an American attorney and Democratic U.S. senator from the state of North Carolina between 1950 and 1953.

== Early life and education ==
Born in Norfolk Virginia, he moved to North Carolina before age 2. After graduating from Trinity College (now the undergraduate liberal arts college of Duke University) in 1910 and Duke University Law School in 1912, he became a practicing attorney—but interrupted his work to serve in the United States Army during World War I. In 1912, he founded the law firm that eventually became known as Smith, Anderson, Blount, Dorsett, Mitchell & Jernigan (informally "Smith Anderson").

== Political career ==
Smith served in the North Carolina House of Representatives from 1927 to 1932, and was briefly the speaker of that body in 1931. He also served as a U.S. observer at the Nuremberg Trials in 1946, as chairman of the American delegation to the Inter-Parliamentary Union in Bern, Switzerland in 1952, as chairman of the Duke University board of trustees (1947 - 1953), and as president of the American Bar Association (1945-1946).

In the Democratic primary of 1950, Smith defeated incumbent Sen. Frank Porter Graham for the nomination. Graham had been appointed to fill the vacancy caused by the death of J. Melville Broughton and had served only a little over a year at the time of his defeat. In a campaign distinguished by race-baiting, Graham, who was well known for his civil rights sympathies, was supported by President Harry Truman and the state's liberal Democratic faction, while Smith was aided by strategist Jesse Helms.

== Death ==
He died due to coronary thrombosis in 1953 in Bethesda, Maryland and was interred at the Historic Oakwood Cemetery in Raleigh, North Carolina.

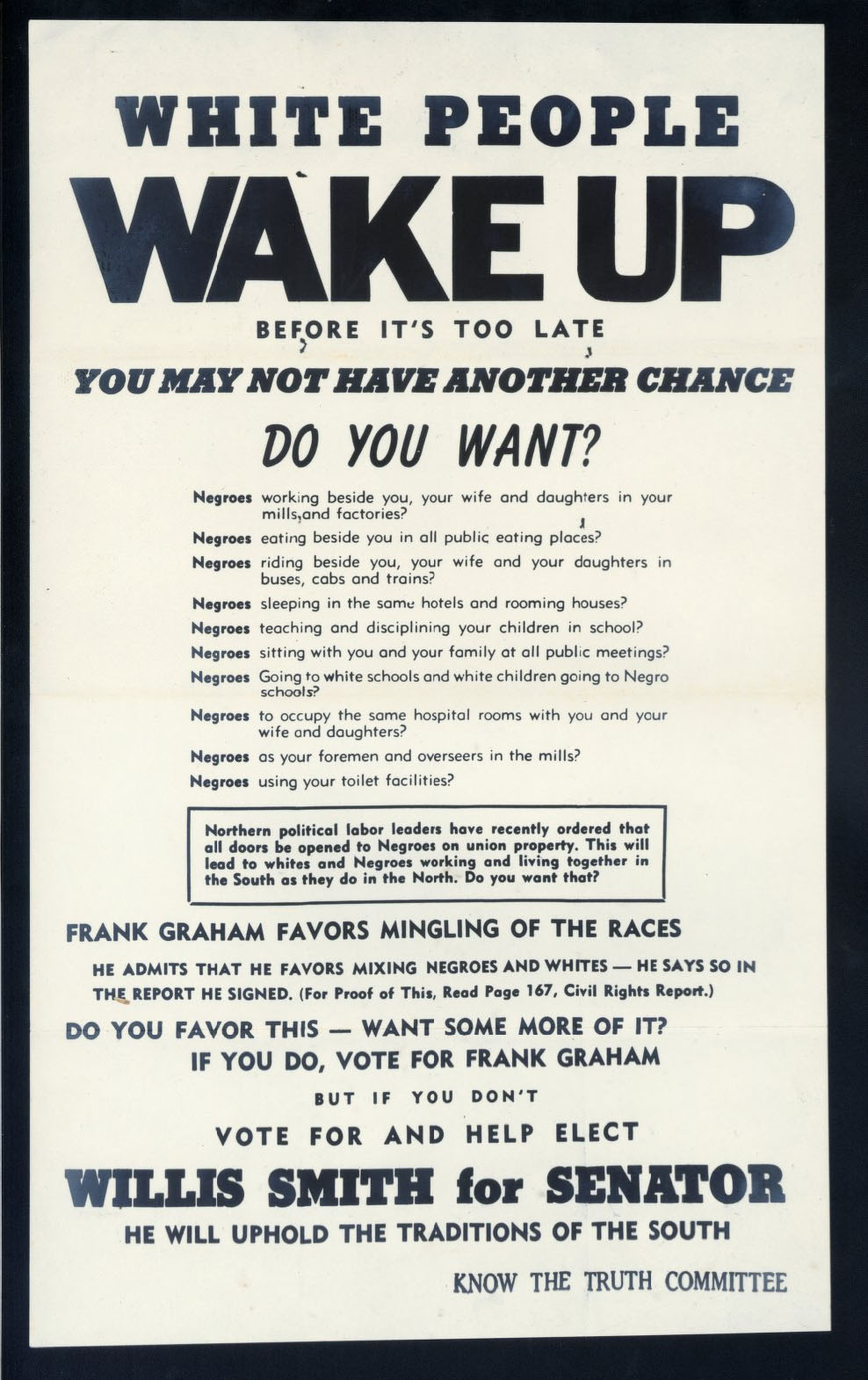
Campaign flyer for Willis Smith for Senate in the 1950 US Senate race in North Carolina.

== See also ==
- List of members of the United States Congress who died in office (1950–1999)

Party political offices
Preceded by J. Melville Broughton	Democratic nominee for U.S. Senator from North Carolina (Class 2); 1950	Succeeded by W. Kerr Scott
Preceded by Alexander H. Graham	Speaker of the North Carolina House of Representatives; 1931	Succeeded by Reginald L. Harris
U.S. Senate
Preceded by Frank Porter Graham	U.S. senator (Class 2) from North Carolina; 1950–1953; Served alongside: Clyde Roark Hoey	Succeeded by Alton Asa Lennon
