= Alton Lennon =

American politician

Alton A. Lennon
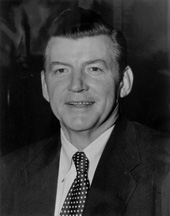

Member of the U.S. House of Representatives from North Carolina's 7th district
- In office January 3, 1957 – January 3, 1973
- Preceded by: Frank Ertel Carlyle
- Succeeded by: Charlie Rose

United States Senator from North Carolina
- In office July 10, 1953 – November 28, 1954
- Appointed by: William B. Umstead
- Preceded by: Willis Smith
- Succeeded by: William Kerr Scott

Member of the North Carolina Senate from the 9th district
- In office 1947–1951
- Preceded by: Roy Rowe

Personal details
- Born: Alton Asa Lennon; August 17, 1906 Wilmington, North Carolina, U.S.
- Died: December 28, 1986 (aged 80) Wilmington, North Carolina, U.S.
- Party: Democratic
- Spouse: Karine Welch
- Profession: Politician

Alton Asa Lennon (August 17, 1906 – December 28, 1986) was an American Democratic politician who represented North Carolina in the U.S. House of Representatives and Senate. He first served as an interim appointment to the Senate from 1953 to 1954, unsuccessfully sought re-election, and later represented the Cape Fear region in the House from 1957 to 1973. Lennon is one of very few former senators in modern times to serve in the House after leaving the Senate. (Note: The others are James Wolcott Wadsworth Jr. of New York, Claude Pepper of Florida, Hugh Mitchell of Washington, Garrett Withers of Kentucky, Magnus Johnson from Minnesota, Matthew M. Neely of West Virginia, and Charles A. Towne. Only Wadsworth, Pepper, Neely, and Johnson were ever elected to the Senate; the rest, like Lennon, were interim appointments.)

== Early life and education ==
Lennon was born in Wilmington, North Carolina August 17, 1906. He was the son of Rosser Yates Lennon and Minnie (High) Lennon. He attended the public schools, and graduated from Wake Forest College in 1929. He was admitted to the bar in 1929 and began practice in Wilmington. He married Karine Welch on October 12, 1933.

== Political career ==
Lennon served as the judge of New Hanover County Recorder's Court from 1934 to 1942. He was elected to the North Carolina State Senate in 1947, and served until 1951.

=== U.S. Senate ===
Lennon was appointed on July 10, 1953, as a Democrat to the United States Senate to fill the vacancy caused by the death of Willis Smith and served from July 10, 1953, to November 28, 1954. He was an unsuccessful candidate for the nomination in 1954 to fill the vacancy.

=== U.S. House of Representatives ===
He resumed law practice, then was elected as a Democrat to the 85th Congress, and was reelected to the seven succeeding Congresses (January 3, 1957 – January 3, 1973).

Lennon voted in Congress against civil rights and social legislation, although about half of the constituents in his district were African Americans or Native Americans. Lennon voted against the Civil Rights Acts of 1957, the Civil Rights Acts of 1960, the Civil Rights Acts of 1964, and the Civil Rights Acts of 1968 as well as the 24th Amendment to the U.S. Constitution and the Voting Rights Act of 1965. In 1966, he was the only Southerner to vote against citing seven Ku Klux Klan leaders for contempt of Congress. He said, "I never heard it said that Klansmen were subversive or affiliated with any foreign government to overthrow the United States." In 1966, Lennon urged that North Vietnamese ports be bombed, and in 1967 he called for the Justice Department to prosecute Stokely Carmichael, the black activist, for making statements against the military draft.

He declined to seek reelection in 1972. Although he was a Democrat, Lennon campaigned for the re-election of Senator Jesse Helms, the conservative Republican, in 1978.

== Death and legacy ==
He was a resident of Wilmington, N.C., until his death there December 28, 1986.

In 1976, the Federal Building and Courthouse at Wilmington was named in his honor.

== Notes ==
U.S. Senate
| Preceded by Willis Smith | U.S. senator (Class 2) from North Carolina; July 10, 1953 – November 28, 1954; Served alongside: Clyde Roark Hoey, Sam Ervin | Succeeded by William Kerr Scott |
U.S. House of Representatives
| Preceded by Frank Ertel Carlyle | Member of the U.S. House of Representatives from North Carolina's 7th congressional district 1957–1973 | Succeeded by Charlie Rose |
