= List of elections in 1956 =

The following elections occurred in the year 1956.

== Africa ==
- 1956 Egyptian referendum
- 1956 Gold Coast legislative election
- 1956 Italian Somaliland parliamentary election
- 1956–1957 Kenyan legislative election
- 1956 Libyan general election
- 1956 Nyasaland general election
- 1956 Tunisian Constituent Assembly election

== Asia ==
- 1956 Burmese general election
- 1956 Ceylonese parliamentary election
- 1956 Egyptian referendum
- 1956 Iranian legislative election
- 1956 Japanese House of Councillors election
- 1956 Jordanian general election
- 1956 Malayan local elections
- 1956 North Korean local elections
- 1956 Pakistani presidential election
- 1956 Saudi Arabian municipal elections
- 1956 South Korean local elections
- 1956 South Korean presidential election
- 1956 South Vietnamese Constitutional Assembly election

== Australia ==
- 1956 New South Wales state election
- 1956 Queensland state election
- 1956 South Australian state election
- 1956 Tasmanian state election
- 1956 Wentworth by-election
- 1956 Western Australian state election

== Europe ==
- 1956 Dutch general election
- 1956 Finnish presidential election
- 1956 Italian local elections
- 1956 Gibraltar general election
- 1956 Greek legislative election
- 1956 Icelandic parliamentary election
- 1956 Icelandic presidential election
- 1956 Maltese integration into the United Kingdom referendum
- 1956 Swedish general election
- 1956 Swiss referendums

=== Austria ===
- 1956 Austrian legislative election

=== France ===
- 1956 French legislative election

=== United Kingdom ===
- 1956 Chester-le-Street by-election
- 1956 Gainsborough by-election
- 1956 Hereford by-election
- 1956 Leeds North East by-election
- 1956 Mid Ulster by-election
- 1956 Newport by-election
- 1956 Walthamstow West by-election

==== United Kingdom local ====
===== English local =====
- 1956 Bermondsey Borough election
- 1956 Southwark Borough election

== North America ==
- 1956 Honduran Constituent Assembly election
- 1956 Panamanian general election
- 1956 Salvadoran legislative election
- 1956 Salvadoran presidential election

=== Canada ===
- 1956 British Columbia general election
- 1956 Edmonton municipal election
- 1956 New Brunswick general election
- 1956 Newfoundland general election
- 1956 Nova Scotia general election
- 1956 Ottawa municipal election
- 1956 Quebec general election
- 1956 Saskatchewan general election
- 1956 Toronto municipal election

=== Caribbean ===
- 1956 Antigua and Barbuda general election
- 1956 Cuban parliamentary election
- 1956 Puerto Rican general election
- 1956 Trinidad and Tobago general election

=== United States ===
- 1956 United States elections
- 1956 United States presidential election

==== United States lieutenant gubernatorial ====
- 1956 Delaware lieutenant gubernatorial election
- 1956 Illinois lieutenant gubernatorial election
- 1956 Louisiana lieutenant gubernatorial election
- 1956 Minnesota lieutenant gubernatorial election
- 1956 Missouri lieutenant gubernatorial election
- 1956 Nebraska lieutenant gubernatorial election
- 1956 North Carolina lieutenant gubernatorial election
- 1956 Wisconsin lieutenant gubernatorial election

==== United States gubernatorial ====
- 1956 Arizona gubernatorial election
- 1956 Arkansas gubernatorial election
- 1956 Colorado gubernatorial election
- 1956 Delaware gubernatorial election
- 1956 Florida gubernatorial election
- 1956 Illinois gubernatorial election
- 1956 Indiana gubernatorial election
- 1956 Iowa gubernatorial election
- 1956 Kansas gubernatorial election
- 1956 Louisiana gubernatorial election
- 1956 Maine gubernatorial election
- 1956 Massachusetts gubernatorial election
- 1956 Michigan gubernatorial election
- 1956 Minnesota gubernatorial election
- 1956 Missouri gubernatorial election
- 1956 Montana gubernatorial election
- 1956 Nebraska gubernatorial election
- 1956 New Hampshire gubernatorial election
- 1956 New Mexico gubernatorial election
- 1956 North Carolina gubernatorial election
- 1956 North Dakota gubernatorial election
- 1956 Ohio gubernatorial election
- 1956 Oregon gubernatorial special election
- 1956 Rhode Island gubernatorial election
- 1956 South Dakota gubernatorial election
- 1956 Texas gubernatorial election
- 1956 United States gubernatorial elections
- 1956 Utah gubernatorial election
- 1956 Vermont gubernatorial election
- 1956 Washington gubernatorial election
- 1956 West Virginia gubernatorial election
- 1956 Wisconsin gubernatorial election

==== United States House of Representatives ====
- 1956 United States House of Representatives elections
- United States House of Representatives elections in California, 1956
- United States House of Representatives elections in South Carolina, 1956

==== United States Senate ====
- 1956 United States Senate elections
- 1956 United States Senate election in Alabama
- 1956 United States Senate election in Arizona
- 1956 United States Senate election in Arkansas
- 1956 United States Senate election in California
- 1956 United States Senate election in Colorado
- 1956 United States Senate election in Connecticut
- 1956 United States Senate election in Florida
- 1956 United States Senate election in Georgia
- 1956 United States Senate election in Idaho
- 1956 United States Senate election in Illinois
- 1956 United States Senate election in Indiana
- 1956 United States Senate election in Iowa
- 1956 United States Senate election in Kansas
- 1956 United States Senate election in Kentucky
- 1956 United States Senate special election in Kentucky
- 1956 United States Senate election in Louisiana
- 1956 United States Senate election in Maryland
- 1956 United States Senate election in Missouri
- 1956 United States Senate election in Nevada
- 1956 United States Senate election in New Hampshire
- 1956 United States Senate election in New York
- 1956 United States Senate election in North Carolina
- 1956 United States Senate election in North Dakota
- 1956 United States Senate election in Ohio
- 1956 United States Senate election in Oklahoma
- 1956 United States Senate election in Oregon
- 1956 United States Senate election in Pennsylvania
- 1956 United States Senate election in South Carolina
- 1956 United States Senate special election in South Carolina
- 1956 United States Senate election in South Dakota
- 1956 United States Senate election in Utah
- 1956 United States Senate election in Vermont
- 1956 United States Senate election in Washington
- 1956 United States Senate special election in West Virginia
- 1956 United States Senate election in Wisconsin

==== United States mayoral ====
- 1956 Auburn, Alabama municipal elections
- 1956 Tampa mayoral special election

== Oceania ==
=== Australia ===
- 1956 Barker by-election
- 1956 Cunningham by-election
- 1956 New South Wales state election
- 1956 Queensland state election
- 1956 South Australian state election
- 1956 Tasmanian state election
- 1956 Wentworth by-election
- 1956 Western Australian state election

== South America ==
=== Falkland Islands ===
- 1956 Falkland Islands general election
