= Senator Joyner =

Senator Joyner may refer to:

- Arthenia Joyner (born 1943), Florida State Senate
- Herbert C. Joyner (1838–1927), Massachusetts State Senate
- Norman Joyner (1922–1992), North Carolina State Senate
- William C. Joyner (1880–1943), Arizona State Senate

== See also ==
- Senator Joiner (disambiguation)
