= 1960 North Carolina lieutenant gubernatorial election =

- November 8, 1960
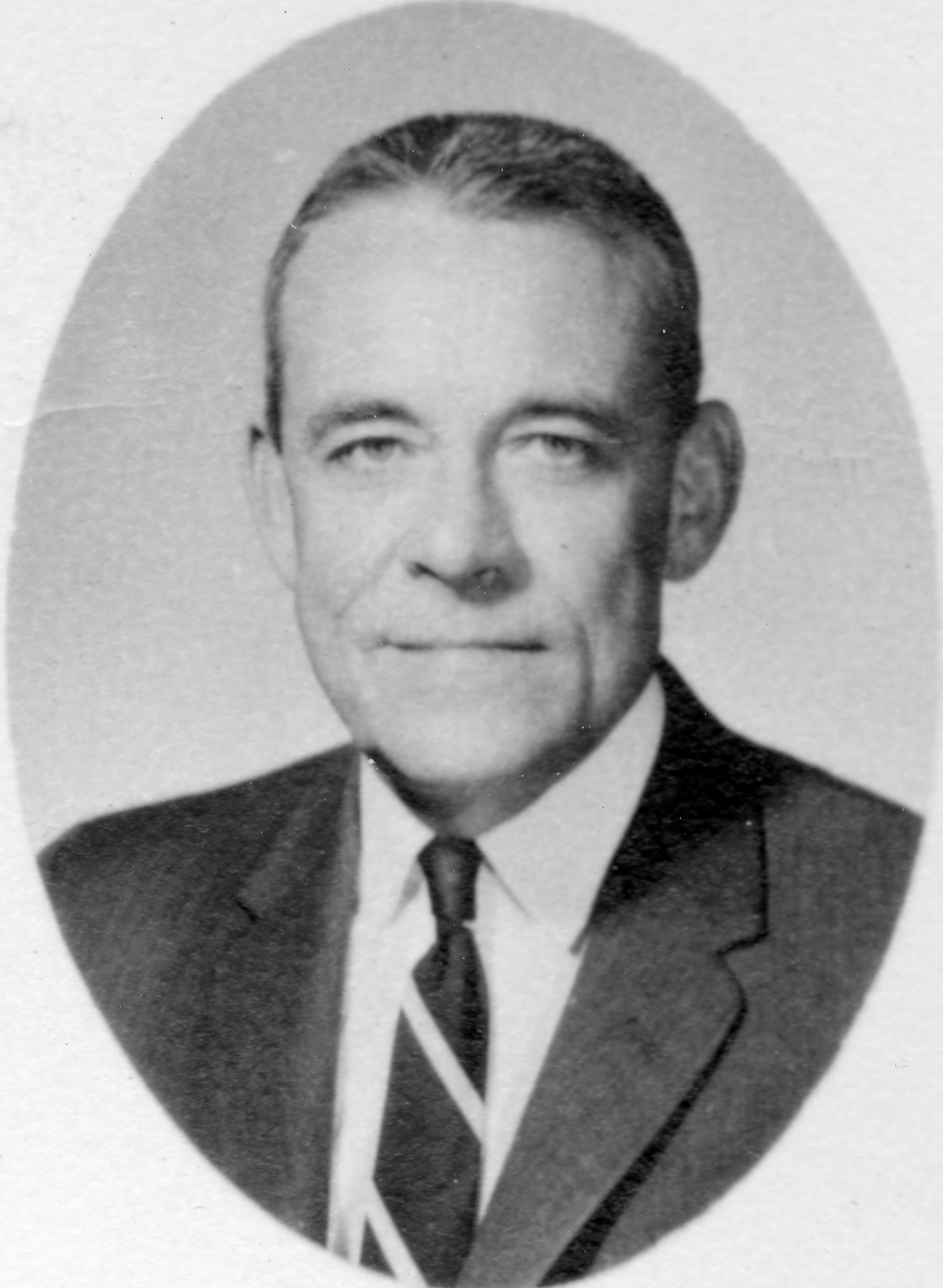

Nominee	Harvey Cloyd Philpott	S. Clyde Eggers
Party	Democratic	Republican
Popular vote	765,519	532,445
Percentage	58.98%	41.02%
Lieutenant Governor before election
Luther E. Barnhardt
Democratic
Elected Lieutenant Governor
Harvey Cloyd Philpott
Democratic

The 1960 North Carolina lieutenant gubernatorial election was held on November 8, 1960. Democratic nominee Harvey Cloyd Philpott defeated Republican nominee S. Clyde Eggers with 58.98% of the vote.

== Primary elections ==
Primary elections were held on May 28, 1960.

=== Democratic primary ===
==== Candidates ====
- Harvey Cloyd Philpott, former State Representative
- C. V. Henkel, State Senator
- David M. McConnell

==== Results ====
Democratic primary results
Party	Candidate	Votes	%
Democratic	Harvey Cloyd Philpott	238,353	40.04
Democratic	C.V. Henkel	181,850	30.55
Democratic	David M. McConnell	175,150	29.42
Total votes		595,353	100.00

=== Republican primary ===
==== Candidates ====
- David E. Bailey
- S. Clyde Eggers, former State Representative
- Otha B. Batten

==== Results ====
Republican primary results
Party	Candidate	Votes	%
Republican	David E. Bailey	10,704	51.59
Republican	S. Clyde Eggers	6,401	30.85
Republican	Otha B. Batten	3,645	17.57
Total votes		233,074	100.00

== General election ==
=== Candidates ===
- Harvey Cloyd Philpott, Democratic
- S. Clyde Eggers, Republican

=== Results ===
1960 North Carolina lieutenant gubernatorial election
Party	Candidate	Votes	%	±%
Democratic	Harvey Cloyd Philpott	765,519	58.98%	
Republican	S. Clyde Eggers	532,445	41.02%	
Majority		233,074		
Turnout				
Democratic hold		Swing		
