= 1956 Louisiana lieutenant gubernatorial election =

- April 17, 1956

Nominee	Lether Edward Frazar	Harry R. Hill
Party	Democratic	Republican
Popular vote	164,883	19,428
Percentage	89.46%	10.54%
- Parish results Frazar: 70–80% 80–90% 90–100%
Lieutenant Governor before election
C. E. Barham
Democratic
Elected Lieutenant Governor
Lether Edward Frazar
Democratic

The 1956 Louisiana lieutenant gubernatorial election was held on April 17, 1956, in order to elect the lieutenant governor of Louisiana. Democratic nominee and former member of the Louisiana House of Representatives Lether Edward Frazar defeated Republican nominee Harry R. Hill.

== Democratic primary ==
The Democratic primary election was held on February 1, 1956. Candidate Lether Edward Frazar received a majority of the votes (45.59%), and advanced without a runoff as a result of Earl Long winning the Governor's primary with a majority. Frazar was thus elected as the nominee for the general election.

=== Results ===
1956 Democratic lieutenant gubernatorial primary
Party	Candidate	Votes	%
Democratic	Lether Edward Frazar	337,679	45.59%
Democratic	C. E. Barham (incumbent)	196,616	26.54%
Democratic	A. Brown Moore	111,449	15.05%
Democratic	J. Bentley Alexander	53,533	7.22%
Democratic	Wesley H. Clanton	41,478	5.60%
Total votes		740,755	100.00%

== General election ==
On election day, April 17, 1956, Democratic nominee Lether Edward Frazar won the election by a margin of 145,455 votes against his opponent Republican nominee Harry R. Hill, thereby retaining Democratic control over the office of lieutenant governor. Frazar was sworn in as the 44th lieutenant governor of Louisiana on May 15, 1956.

=== Results ===
Louisiana lieutenant gubernatorial election, 1956
Party	Candidate	Votes	%
Democratic	Lether Edward Frazar	164,883	89.46
Republican	Harry R. Hill	19,428	10.54
Total votes		184,311	100.00
Democratic hold			
