= Southern Democrats =

American regional political faction

Southern Democrats are members of the U.S. Democratic Party who reside in the Southern United States.

Before the American Civil War, Southern Democrats mostly believed in anti-elitist Jacksonian democracy, to extend voting to non-land-owning white men. In the 19th century, they defended slavery in the United States and promoted its expansion into the Western United States against the Free Soil opposition in the Northern United States. The United States presidential election of 1860 formalized the split in the Democratic Party and brought about the American Civil War. After the Reconstruction Era ended in the late 1870s, so-called redeemers were Southern Democrats who controlled all the southern states and disenfranchised African Americans.

The monopoly that the Democratic Party held over most of the South showed signs of breaking apart in 1948, when many white Southern Democrats—upset by the policies of desegregation enacted during the administration of Democratic president Harry Truman—created the States' Rights Democratic Party. This new party, commonly referred to as the "Dixiecrats", nominated South Carolina governor Strom Thurmond for president. The new party collapsed after Truman unexpectedly won the 1948 United States presidential election.

Despite being a Southern Democrat himself, President Lyndon B. Johnson signed the Civil Rights Act of 1964 and the Voting Rights Act of 1965. These actions led to heavy opposition from Southern Democrats. 1964 Republican nominee Barry Goldwater voted against the Civil Rights Act, which caused Goldwater to sweep the Deep South even though he lost badly outside the South. Many scholars have stated that southern whites shifted to the Republican Party after a civil rights culture change and due to social conservatism.

Republicans first dominated presidential elections in the South, then won a majority of Southern gubernatorial and congressional elections after the 1994 Republican Revolution. By the 21st century, and especially after the 2010 midterm elections, the Republican Party had gained a solid advantage over the Democratic Party in most southern states.

Southern Democrats of the 21st century, such as Jon Ossoff, Raphael Warnock, Josh Stein, and Abigail Spanberger are considerably more liberal than their predecessors. No Democrat has been elected president without winning at least two of the 11 former Confederate states, including winning either Georgia or Florida.

Recent gains made by Democrats in the South in the 2026 Midterms, especially in North Carolina, and Texas suggest Democrats may be solidifying gains in these states.

== History ==
=== 1828–1861 ===
The title of "Democrat" has its beginnings in the South, going back to the founding of the Democratic-Republican Party in 1793 by Thomas Jefferson and James Madison. It held to small government principles and distrusted the national government. Foreign policy was a major issue. After being the dominant party in U.S. politics from 1801 to 1829, the Democratic-Republicans split into two factions by 1828: the federalist National Republicans (who became the Whigs), and the Democrats. The Democrats and Whigs were evenly balanced in the 1830s and 1840s. However, by the 1850s, the Whigs disintegrated. Other opposition parties emerged but the Democrats were dominant. Northern Democrats were in serious opposition to Southern Democrats on the issue of slavery; Northern Democrats, led by Stephen Douglas, believed in Popular Sovereignty—letting the people of the territories vote on slavery. The Southern Democrats, reflecting the views of the late John C. Calhoun, insisted slavery was national.

The Democrats controlled the national government from 1853 until 1861, and presidents Pierce and Buchanan were friendly to Southern interests. In the North, the newly formed anti-slavery Republican Party came to power and dominated the electoral college. In the 1860 presidential election, the Republicans nominated Abraham Lincoln, but the divide among Democrats led to the nomination of two candidates: John C. Breckinridge of Kentucky represented Southern Democrats, and Stephen A. Douglas of Illinois represented Northern Democrats. Nevertheless, the Republicans had a majority of the electoral vote regardless of how the opposition split or joined and Abraham Lincoln was elected.

=== 1861–1933 ===
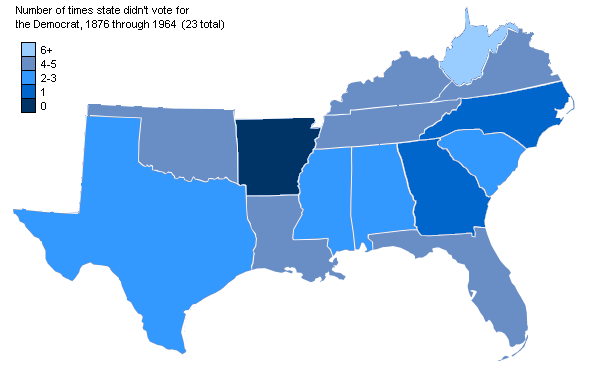
Arkansas voted Democratic in all 23 presidential elections from 1876 through 1964; other states were not quite as solid but generally supported Democrats for president.

After the election of Abraham Lincoln, Southern Democrats led the charge to secede from the Union and establish the Confederate States. The United States Congress was dominated by Republicans; a notable exception was Democrat Andrew Johnson of Tennessee, the only senator from a state in rebellion to reject secession. The Border States or Border South of Kentucky, Maryland, and Missouri of the Upper South were torn by political turmoil. Kentucky and Missouri were both governed by pro-secessionist Southern Democratic governors who vehemently rejected Lincoln's call for 75,000 troops. Kentucky and Missouri both held secession conventions, but neither officially declared secession, leading to split Unionist and Confederate state governments in both states. Southern Democrats in Maryland faced a Unionist governor Thomas Holliday Hicks and the Union army. Armed with the suspension of habeas corpus and Union troops, Governor Hicks was able to stop Maryland's secession movement. Maryland was the only state south of the Mason–Dixon line whose governor affirmed Lincoln's call for 75,000 troops.

After secession, the Democratic vote in the North split between the War Democrats and the Peace Democrats or Copperheads. The War Democrats voted for Lincoln in the 1864 election, and Lincoln had a War Democrat — Andrew Johnson — on his ticket. In the South, during Reconstruction the white Republican element, called Scalawags became smaller and smaller as more and more joined the Democrats. In the North, most War Democrats returned to the Democrats, and when the Panic of 1873 hit, the Republican Party was blamed and the Democrats gained control of the House of Representatives in 1875. The Democrats emphasized that since Jefferson and Jackson they had been the party of states' rights, which added to their appeal in the white South.

At the beginning of the 20th century, the Democrats, led by the dominant Southern wing, had a strong representation in Congress. In the 57th United States Congress, there were 22 Democratic senators and 59 Democratic representatives from southern states, compared with 9 Democratic senators and 56 Democratic representatives from other regions. Southern Democrats were also ideologically diverse; with conservatives on one side and progressives on the other. In regards to the latter, a Republican newspaper from the 1900s described the southern Democratic leadership as just as “wrong-headed and fanatical on economic questions and as strong in its socialistic tendencies as the Bryan and Hearst Democracy in the northern states.” Nevertheless, much of the southern wing of the Democratic wing was ideologically conservative, with one Texas progressive warning Woodrow Wilson shortly after his election as president in late 1912 that “the Democratic Party is now in a most perilous situation. The danger lies largely in the Southern States and arises out of the fact that a large element of the party in those states are not Democrats in reality, but stand-pat Republicans, sailing under the colors of Democracy, and others who, having no political convictions, are machine gangsters.”

Despite this, southern congressmen during Wilson’s presidency were (according to one study) “forceful advocates of national assistance, especially in the field of agriculture” and provided large majorities for various measures under Wilson such as better regulation of commodity exchanges, vocational education, an agricultural extension program, a federal warehouse statute, and long-term rural credits. Southern Democrats also held powerful positions in Congress during the Wilson administration, with one study noting: "Though comprising only about half of the Democratic senators and slightly over two-fifths of the Democratic representatives, the southerners made up a large majority of the party's senior members in the two houses. They exerted great weight in the two Democratic caucuses and headed almost all of the important congressional committees." During the 1920s, according to one observer, the majority of Southern Democrats were supportive of progressive initiatives such as those aimed at assisting farmers.

From 1896 to 1912 and 1921 to 1931, the Democrats were relegated to second place status in national politics and didn't control a single branch of the federal government despite universal dominance in most of the Solid South. In 1928 several Southern states dallied with voting Republican in supporting Herbert Hoover over the Roman Catholic Al Smith, but the behavior was short lived as the stock market crash of 1929 returned Republicans to disfavor throughout the South. Nationally, Republicans lost Congress in January 1931 and the White House in March 1933 by huge margins. By this time, too, the Democratic Party leadership began to change its tone somewhat on racial politics. With the Great Depression gripping the nation, and with the lives of most Americans disrupted, the assisting of African Americans in American society was seen as necessary by the new government.

In 1932, southern Democrats held 38% of the party’s Congressional seats in the House, and 44% in the Senate.

=== 1933–1981 ===
During the 1930s, as the New Deal began to move Democrats as a whole to the left in economic policy, Southern Democrats were mostly supportive, although by the late 1930s there was a growing conservative faction. Both factions supported Roosevelt's foreign policies. By 1948 the protection of segregation led Democrats in the Deep South to reject Truman and run a third party ticket of Dixiecrats in the 1948 United States presidential election. After 1964, Southern Democrats lost major battles during the Civil Rights Movement. Federal laws ended segregation and restrictions on black voters.

During the civil rights movement era, Democrats in the South initially still voted loyally with their party. After the signing of the Civil Rights Act of 1964, the old argument that all whites had to stick together to prevent civil rights legislation lost its force because the legislation had now been passed. More and more whites began to vote Republican, especially in the suburbs and growing cities. Newcomers from the North were mostly Republican; they were now joined by conservatives and wealthy Southern whites, while liberal whites and poor whites, especially in rural areas, remained with the Democratic Party.

The New Deal program of Franklin Delano Roosevelt (FDR) generally united the party factions for over three decades, since Southerners, like Northern urban populations, were hit particularly hard and generally benefited from the massive governmental relief program. FDR was adept at holding white Southerners in the coalition while simultaneously beginning the erosion of Black voters away from their then-characteristic Republican preferences. The Civil Rights Movement of the 1960s catalyzed the end of this Democratic Party coalition of interests by magnetizing Black voters to the Democratic label and simultaneously ending white supremacist control of the Democratic Party apparatus. A series of court decisions, rendering primary elections as public instead of private events administered by the parties, essentially freed the Southern region to change more toward the two-party behavior of most of the rest of the nation.

In the presidential elections of 1952 and 1956 Republican nominee Dwight D. Eisenhower, a popular World War II general, won several Southern states, thus breaking some white Southerners away from their Democratic Party pattern. The senior position of Southern congressmen and senators, and the discipline of many groups such as the Southern Caucus meant that Civil Rights initiatives tended to be blunted despite popular support.

The passage of the Civil Rights Act of 1964 was a significant event in converting the Deep South to the Republican Party; in that year most senatorial Republicans supported the act (most of the opposition came from Southern Democrats). After the passage of this act, however, their willingness to support Republicans on a national level increased demonstrably. In 1964, Republican presidential nominee Goldwater, who had voted against the Civil Rights Act, won many of the "Solid South" states over Democratic presidential nominee Lyndon B. Johnson, himself a Texan, and with many this Republican support continued and seeped down the ballot to congressional, state, and ultimately local levels. A further significant item of legislation was the Voting Rights Act of 1965, which targeted for preclearance by the U.S. Department of Justice any election-law change in areas where African-American voting participation was lower than the norm (most but not all of these areas were in the South); the effect of the Voting Rights Act on southern elections was profound, including the by-product that some white Southerners perceived it as meddling while Black voters universally appreciated it. Nixon aide Kevin Phillips told The New York Times in 1970 that "Negrophobe" whites would quit the Democrats if Republicans enforced the Voting Rights Act and blacks registered as Democrats. The trend toward acceptance of Republican identification among Southern white voters was bolstered in the next two elections by Richard Nixon.

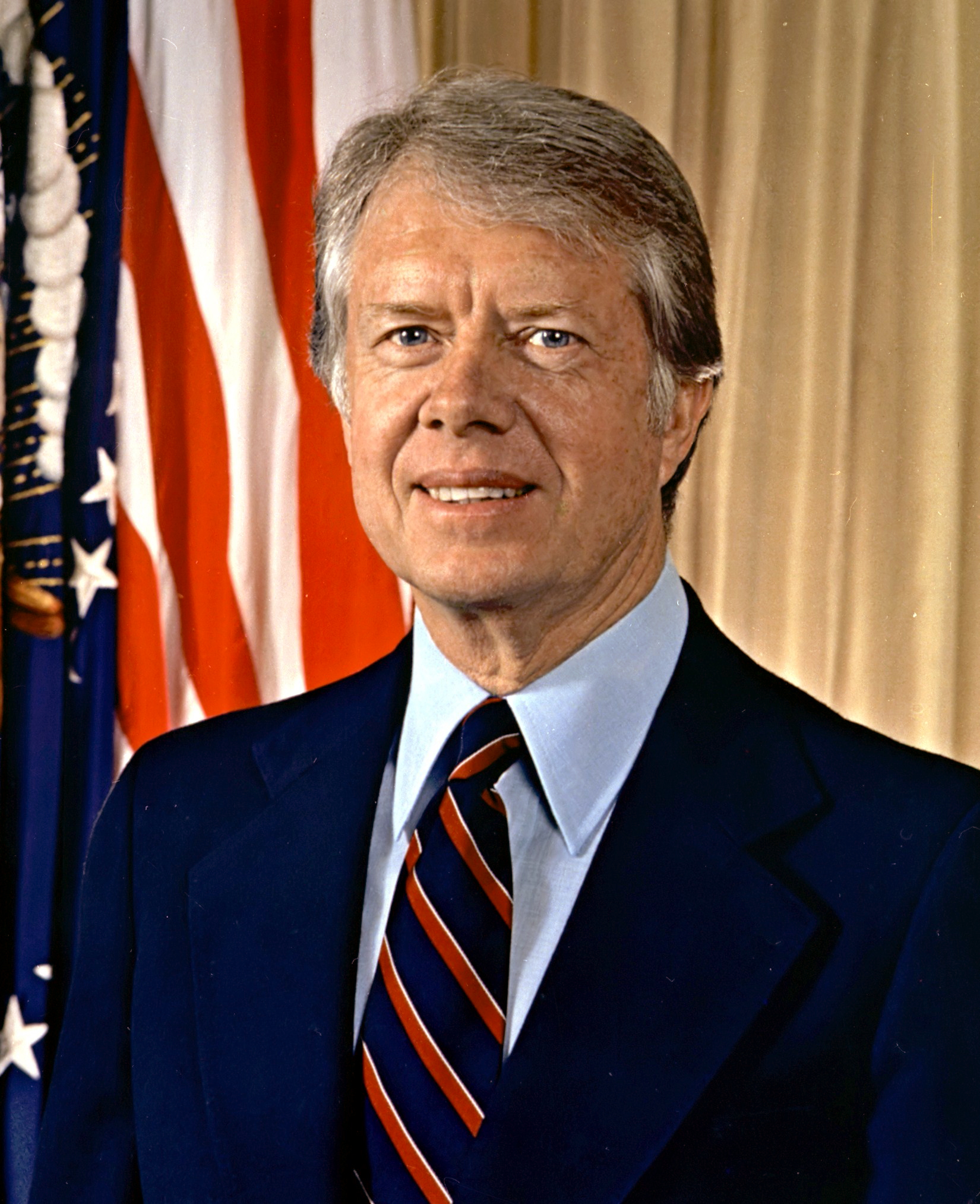
39th U.S. President Jimmy Carter, a Southern Democrat from the state of Georgia and the longest-lived president in U.S. history

Denouncing the forced busing policy that was used to enforce school desegregation, Richard Nixon courted populist conservative Southern whites with what is called the Southern Strategy, though his speechwriter Jeffrey Hart claimed that his campaign rhetoric was actually a "Border State Strategy" and accused the press of being "very lazy" when they called it a "Southern Strategy". In the 1971 Swann v. Charlotte-Mecklenburg Board of Education ruling, the power of the federal government to enforce forced busing was strengthened when the Supreme Court ruled that the federal courts had the discretion to include busing as a desegregation tool to achieve racial balance. Some southern Democrats became Republicans at the national level, while remaining with their old party in state and local politics throughout the 1970s and 1980s. Several prominent conservative Democrats switched parties to become Republicans, including Strom Thurmond, John Connally and Mills E. Godwin Jr. In the 1974 Milliken v. Bradley decision, however, the ability to use forced busing as a political tactic was greatly diminished when the U.S. Supreme Court placed an important limitation on Swann and ruled that students could only be bused across district lines if evidence of de jure segregation across multiple school districts existed.

In 1976, former Georgia governor Jimmy Carter won every Southern state except Oklahoma and Virginia in his successful presidential campaign as a Democrat, being the last Democratic presidential candidate to win a majority of the states in the South as of 2024. In 1980 Republican presidential nominee Ronald Reagan won every southern state except for Georgia, although Alabama, Mississippi, South Carolina, Arkansas, North Carolina and Tennessee were all decided by less than 3%.

=== 1981–2008 ===
In 1980, Republican presidential nominee Ronald Reagan announced that he supported states' rights. Lee Atwater, who served as Reagan's chief strategist in the Southern states, claimed that by 1968, a vast majority of southern whites had learned to accept that racial slurs like nigger were offensive and that mentioning states' rights and reasons for its justification, along with fiscal conservatism and opposition to social programs understood by many white southerners to disproportionally benefit Black Americans, had now become the best way to appeal to southern white voters. Following Reagan's success at the national level, the Republican Party moved sharply to the New Right, with the shrinkage of the Eastern Establishment Rockefeller Republican element that had emphasized their support for civil rights.

Economic and cultural conservatism (especially regarding abortion and LGBT rights) became more important in the South, with its large religious right element, such as Southern Baptists in the Bible Belt. The South gradually became fertile ground for the Republican Party. Following the Voting Rights Act of 1965, the large Black vote in the South held steady but overwhelmingly favored the Democratic Party. Even as the Democratic party came to increasingly depend on the support of African-American voters in the South, well-established white Democratic incumbents still held sway in most Southern states for decades. Starting in 1964, although the Southern states split their support between parties in most presidential elections, conservative Democrats controlled nearly every Southern state legislature until the mid-1990s. On the eve of the Republican Revolution in 1994, Democrats still held a 2:1 advantage over the Republicans in southern congressional seats. Only in 2011 did the Republicans capture a majority of Southern state legislatures, and have continued to hold power over Southern politics for the most part since.

Many of the representatives, senators, and voters who were referred to as Reagan Democrats in the 1980s were conservative Southern Democrats. They often had more conservative views than other Democrats. But there were notable remnants of the Solid South into the early 21st century.

- One example was Arkansas, whose state legislature continued to be majority Democratic (having, however, given its electoral votes to the Republicans in the past three presidential elections, except in 1992 and 1996 when "favorite son" Bill Clinton was the candidate and won each time) until 2012, when Arkansas voters selected a 21–14 Republican majority in the Arkansas Senate.
- Another example was North Carolina. Although the state has voted for Republicans in every presidential election since 1980 except for 2008, the State legislature was in Democratic control until 2010. The North Carolina congressional delegation was heavily Democratic until January 2013 when the Republicans could, after the 2010 United States census, adopt a redistricting plan of their choosing.

In 1992, Arkansas governor Bill Clinton was elected president. Unlike Carter, however, Clinton was only able to win the southern states of Arkansas, Louisiana, Kentucky, Tennessee and Georgia. While running for president, Clinton promised to "end welfare as we have come to know it" while in office. In 1996, Clinton would fulfill his campaign promise and the longtime Republican goal of major welfare reform came into fruition. After two welfare reform bills sponsored by the Republican-controlled Congress were successfully vetoed by the president, a compromise was eventually reached and the Personal Responsibility and Work Opportunity Act was signed into law on August 22, 1996.

During the Clinton administration, the southern strategy shifted towards the so-called "culture war", which saw major political battles between the Religious Right and the secular Left. Chapman notes a split vote among many conservative Southern Democrats in the 1970s and 1980s who supported local and statewide conservative Democrats while simultaneously voting for Republican presidential candidates. This tendency of many Southern whites to vote for the Republican presidential candidate but Democrats from other offices lasted until the 2010 midterm elections. In the November 2008 elections, Democrats won 3 out of 4 U.S. House seats from Mississippi, 3 out of 4 in Arkansas, 5 out of 9 in Tennessee, and achieved near parity in the Georgia and Alabama delegations.

Republicans first dominated presidential elections in the South, then won a majority of Southern gubernatorial and congressional elections after the 1994 Republican Revolution, and finally came to control a majority of Southern state legislatures by the 2010s.

=== 2009–present ===
In 2009, Southern Democrats controlled both branches of the Alabama General Assembly, the Arkansas General Assembly, the Delaware General Assembly, the Louisiana State Legislature, the Maryland General Assembly, the Mississippi Legislature, the North Carolina General Assembly, and the West Virginia Legislature, along with the Council of the District of Columbia, the Kentucky House of Representatives, and the Virginia Senate. Democrats lost control of the North Carolina and Alabama legislatures in 2010, the Louisiana and Mississippi legislatures in 2011 and the Arkansas legislature in 2012. Additionally, in 2014, Democrats lost four U.S. Senate seats in the South (in West Virginia, North Carolina, Arkansas, and Louisiana) that they had previously held. By 2017, Southern Democrats only controlled both branches of the Delaware General Assembly and the Maryland General Assembly, along with the Council of the District of Columbia; they had lost control of both houses of the state legislatures in Alabama, Arkansas, Kentucky, Louisiana, Mississippi, North Carolina, and West Virginia.

Nearly all white Democratic representatives in the South lost reelection in the 2010 midterm elections. That year, Democrats won only one U.S. House seat each in Alabama, Mississippi, Louisiana, South Carolina, and Arkansas, and two out of nine House seats in Tennessee, and they lost their one Arkansas seat in 2012. Following the November 2010 elections, John Barrow of Georgia was left as the only white Democratic U.S. House member in the Deep South, and he lost reelection in 2014. There would be no more white Democrats from the Deep South until Joe Cunningham was elected from a South Carolina U.S. House district in 2018, and he lost re-election in 2020.

However, even since January 2015, Democrats have not been completely shut out of power in the South. Democrat John Bel Edwards was elected governor of Louisiana in 2015 and won re-election in 2019, running as an anti-abortion, pro-gun conservative Democrat. In a 2017 special election, moderate Democrat Doug Jones was elected a U.S. Senator from Alabama, though he lost re-election in 2020. Democrat Roy Cooper was elected governor of North Carolina in 2016, won re-election in 2020, and Democrat Josh Stein won in 2024. Andy Beshear was elected governor of Kentucky in 2019 and won re-election in 2023. As of February 2025, Democrats control the governorships of Kentucky, North Carolina, Maryland, and Delaware and the state legislatures of Maryland, Delaware, and Virginia. Joe Manchin would be the last Democrat to win statewide in West Virginia in 2018, later switching to Independent status, before declining to run for re-election in 2024.

Since 2017, most U.S. House or state legislative seats held by Democrats in the South are majority-minority or urban districts. Due to growing urbanization and changing demographics in many Southern states, more liberal Democrats have found success in the South. In the 2018 elections, Democrats nearly succeeded in taking governor's seats in Georgia and Florida and gained 12 national House seats in the South; the trend continued in the 2019 elections, where Democrats took both houses of the Virginia General Assembly, and in 2020 where Joe Biden narrowly won Georgia with Republicans winning down ballot, along with Raphael Warnock and Jon Ossoff narrowly winning both U.S. Senate seats in that state just two months later. However, Democrats would lose the governor races in Florida and Georgia in 2022 by wider margins than in 2018, though Senator Warnock won re-election in Georgia.

Virginia is a notable exception to Republican dominance in the former 11 Confederate states, due to Northern Virginia being part of the Washington metropolitan area, with both major parties continuing to be competitive in the State in the 21st century. Both of Virginia's U.S. Senators are Democrats, as is Governor Abigail Spanberger.

As of the 2020s, Southern Democrats who consistently vote for the Democratic ticket are mostly urban liberals or African Americans, while most white Southerners of both genders tend to vote for the Republican ticket, although there are sizable numbers of swing voters who sometimes split their tickets or cross party lines. Also, some Southerners who are former Republican moderates or conservative Trumpism opponents flocked to the Democratic Party.

== Election results ==
Won by Harris/Walz

2024 United States presidential election results
States / Commonwealth / Federal district	United States presidential election	Electoral college	Democratic		
States / Commonwealth / Federal district	United States presidential election	Electoral college	#	%	Change
Alabama	United States presidential election in Alabama	9	772,412	34.10%	0
Arkansas	United States presidential election in Arkansas	6	396,905	33.56%	0
Delaware	United States presidential election in Delaware	3	289,758	56.49%	0
District of Columbia	United States presidential election in the District of Columbia	3	294,185	90.28%	0
Florida	United States presidential election in Florida	30	4,683,038	42.99%	0
Georgia	United States presidential election in Georgia	16	2,548,017	48.53%	▼1
Kentucky	United States presidential election in Kentucky	8	704,043	33.94%	0
Louisiana	United States presidential election in Louisiana	8	766,870	38.21%	0
Maryland	United States presidential election in Maryland	10	1,902,577	62.62%	0
Mississippi	United States presidential election in Mississippi	6	466,668	38.00%	0
North Carolina	United States presidential election in North Carolina	16	2,715,375	47.65%	0
Oklahoma	United States presidential election in Oklahoma	7	499,599	31.90%	0
South Carolina	United States presidential election in South Carolina	9	1,028,452	40.36%	0
Tennessee	United States presidential election in Tennessee	11	1,056,265	34.47%	0
Texas	United States presidential election in Texas	40	4,835,250	42.46%	0
Virginia	United States presidential election in Virginia	13	2,335,395	51.83%	0
West Virginia	United States presidential election in West Virginia	5	214,309	28.10%	0

2024 United States federal elections results
States / Commonwealth / Federal district	United States Congress	Total seats	Democratic	
States / Commonwealth / Federal district	United States Congress	Total seats	Seats	Change
Alabama	United States House of Representatives in Alabama	7	2	▲1
Arkansas	United States House of Representatives in Arkansas	4	0	0
Delaware	United States House of Representatives in Delaware	1	1	0
Delaware	United States Senate in Delaware	1	1	0
District of Columbia	United States House Delegate for the District of Columbia	1	1	0
Florida	United States House of Representatives in Florida	28	8	0
Florida	United States Senate in Florida	1	0	0
Georgia	United States House of Representatives in Georgia	14	5	0
Kentucky	United States House of Representatives in Kentucky	6	1	0
Louisiana	United States House of Representatives in Louisiana	6	2	▲1
Maryland	United States House of Representatives in Maryland	8	7	0
Maryland	United States Senate in Maryland	1	1	0
Mississippi	United States House of Representatives in Mississippi	4	1	0
Mississippi	United States Senate in Mississippi	1	0	0
North Carolina	United States House of Representatives in North Carolina	14	4	▼3
Oklahoma	United States House of Representatives in Oklahoma	5	0	0
South Carolina	United States House of Representatives in South Carolina	7	1	0
Tennessee	United States House of Representatives in Tennessee	9	1	0
Tennessee	United States Senate in Tennessee	1	0	0
Texas	United States House of Representatives in Texas	38	13	0
Texas	United States Senate in Texas	1	0	0
Virginia	United States House of Representatives in Virginia	11	6	0
Virginia	United States Senate in Virginia	1	1	0
West Virginia	United States House of Representatives in West Virginia	2	0	0
West Virginia	United States Senate in West Virginia	1	0	▼1

2024 United States gubernatorial elections results
States / Commonwealth / Federal district	Governors	Seat	Democratic
States / Commonwealth / Federal district	Governors	Seat	Change
Delaware	Governor of Delaware	1	0
North Carolina	Governor of North Carolina	1	0
West Virginia	Governor of West Virginia	0	0

2022 United States gubernatorial elections results
States / Commonwealth / Federal district	Governors	Seat	Democratic
States / Commonwealth / Federal district	Governors	Seat	Change
Alabama	Governor of Alabama	0	0
Arkansas	Governor of Arkansas	0	0
Florida	Governor of Florida	0	0
Georgia	Governor of Georgia	0	0
Maryland	Governor of Maryland	1	▲1
Oklahoma	Governor of Oklahoma	0	0
South Carolina	Governor of South Carolina	0	0
Tennessee	Governor of Tennessee	0	0
Texas	Governor of Texas	0	0

2018, (Note: Alabama and Maryland held midterms in every 4 years) 2019, (Note: Louisiana, Mississippi and Virginia only) 2020 and 2021 (Note: Virginia House of Delegates only held off-year every 2 years) United States state legislative election results
States / Commonwealth / Federal district	Legislatures	Total seats	Democratic	
States / Commonwealth / Federal district	Legislatures	Total seats	Seats	Change
Alabama	Alabama House of Representatives	105	28	▼4
Alabama	Alabama Senate	37	8	0
Arkansas	Arkansas House of Representatives	100	23	▼1
Arkansas	Arkansas Senate	18	7	▼2
Delaware	Delaware House of Representatives	41	26	Steady
Delaware	Delaware Senate	10	8	▲2
District of Columbia	Council of the District of Columbia	13	11	0
Florida	Florida House of Representatives	120	42	▼4
Florida	Florida Senate	20	9	▼1
Georgia	Georgia House of Representatives	180	77	▲2
Georgia	Georgia Senate	56	22	▲1
Kentucky	Kentucky House of Representatives	100	25	▼14
Kentucky	Kentucky Senate	19	5	▼2
Louisiana	Louisiana House of Representatives	105	35	▼4
Louisiana	Louisiana Senate	39	12	▼2
Maryland	Maryland House of Delegates	141	99	▲7
Maryland	Maryland Senate	47	32	▼1
Mississippi	Mississippi House of Representatives	122	46	▲2
Mississippi	Mississippi State Senate	52	16	▼3
North Carolina	North Carolina House of Representatives	120	51	▼4
North Carolina	North Carolina Senate	50	22	▲1
Oklahoma	Oklahoma House of Representatives	101	19	▼5
Oklahoma	Oklahoma Senate	24	2	0
South Carolina	South Carolina House of Representatives	123	42	▼1
South Carolina	South Carolina Senate	46	16	▼3
Tennessee	Tennessee House of Representatives	99	26	Steady
Tennessee	Tennessee Senate	16	2	▲1
Texas	Texas House of Representatives	150	67	0
Texas	Texas Senate	16	8	▲1
Virginia	Virginia House of Delegates	100	48	▼5
Virginia	Virginia Senate	40	21	▲2
West Virginia	West Virginia House of Delegates	100	24	▼17
West Virginia	West Virginia Senate	34	11	▼3

2018 United States mayoral election results
Cities	Mayors	Seat	Democratic
Cities	Mayors	Seat	Change
Austin, Texas	Mayor of Austin	1	0
Chesapeake, Virginia	Mayor of Chesapeake	0	0
Corpus Christi, Texas	Mayor of Corpus Christi	0	0
District of Columbia	Mayor of the District of Columbia	1	0
Lexington, Kentucky	Mayor of Lexington	0	▼1
Louisville, Kentucky	Mayor of Louisville	1	0
Lubbock, Texas	Mayor of Lubbock	0	0
Nashville, Tennessee	Mayor of Nashville	1	0
Oklahoma City, Oklahoma	Mayor of Oklahoma City	0	0
Virginia Beach, Virginia	Mayor of Virginia Beach	0	0

== Noted Southern Democrats ==
Individuals are organized in sections by alphabetical order (last name then first name).

=== Southern Democratic U.S. presidents and vice presidents ===
- Alben Barkley, representative, U.S. senator from Kentucky and U.S. vice president
- John C. Breckinridge, 14th vice president of the United States, 5th Confederate States secretary of war, U.S. senator from Kentucky
- John C. Calhoun, 7th vice president of the United States, U.S. senator from South Carolina
- Jimmy Carter, 39th president of the United States, 76th governor of Georgia
- Bill Clinton, 42nd president of the United States, 40th and 42nd governor of Arkansas
- John Nance Garner, 32nd vice president of the United States (1933–1941) and U.S. representative from Texas
- Al Gore, representative and U.S. senator from Tennessee, vice president of the United States (1993–2001) and 2000 Democratic nominee for president
- Andrew Jackson, 7th president of the United States, U.S. senator from Tennessee
- Andrew Johnson, 17th president of the United States, 16th vice president of the United States, U.S. senator from Tennessee
- Lyndon B. Johnson, 36th president of the United States (1963–1969), 37th vice president of the United States (1961–1963) and U.S. representative and senator from Texas
- James K. Polk, 11th president of the United States, 9th governor of Tennessee
- John Tyler, 10th president of the United States, 10th vice president of the United States, U.S. senator from Virginia

=== Incumbent Southern Democratic elected officeholders ===
- Angela Alsobrooks, current U.S. senator from Maryland
- Annie Andrews, U.S. senator-elect from South Carolina
- Andy Beshear, incumbent governor of Kentucky
- Jim Clyburn, current member of the U.S. House of Representatives from South Carolina's 6th district and former House majority whip
- Scott Colom, U.S. senator-elect from Mississippi
- Roy Cooper, Governor of North Carolina (2017–2025) and U.S. senator-elect
- Gina Hinojosa, governor-elect of Texas
- Steny Hoyer, outgoing member of the U.S. House of Representatives from Maryland's 5th district and former House majority leader
- Tim Kaine, Governor of Virginia, Chairman of the DNC, incumbent U.S. senator from Virginia, also the 2016 Democratic vice presidential nominee
- Keisha Lance Bottoms, Mayor of Atlanta and governor-elect of Georgia
- Wes Moore, Governor of Maryland (2023–present)
- Jon Ossoff, current U.S. senator from Georgia
- Jamie Raskin, current member of the U.S. House of Representatives from Maryland's 8th district
- Abigail Spanberger, 75th Governor of Virginia (2026–present)
- Josh Stein, Governor of North Carolina (2025–present)
- James Talarico, U.S. senator-elect from Texas
- Bennie Thompson, current member of the U.S. House of Representatives from Mississippi's 2nd district
- Chris Van Hollen, current U.S. senator from Maryland
- Raphael Warnock, current U.S. senator from Georgia

=== 19th-century Southern Democrats ===
- Judah P. Benjamin, 3rd Confederate States secretary of state, 2nd Confederate States secretary of war, 1st Confederate States attorney general, U.S. senator from Louisiana
- Jefferson Davis, President of the Confederate States, U.S. senator from Mississippi
- Alexander H. Stephens, Vice President of the Confederate States, 50th governor of Georgia

=== 20th-century Southern Democrats ===
- Carl Albert, Speaker of the U.S. House of Representatives from Oklahoma
- Ross Barnett, governor of Mississippi
- James F. Byrnes, U.S. secretary of state, Associate Justice of the U.S. Supreme Court, Representative, U.S. senator, Governor of South Carolina
- Happy Chandler, governor and senator from Kentucky
- Lawton Chiles, U.S. senator from Florida and Governor of Florida
- James O. Eastland, U.S. senator from Mississippi
- Sam Ervin, U.S. senator from North Carolina from 1954 to 1974
- J. William Fulbright, Representative from Arkansas, U.S. senator from Arkansas and longest-served chairman of the Senate Foreign Relations Committee
- Albert Gore Sr., Senator from Tennessee (1953-1971), U.S. Representative (1939-1953)
- Howell Heflin, senator from Alabama
- Spessard Holland, U.S. senator from Florida and Governor of Florida
- Olin D. Johnston, U.S. senator from South Carolina and Governor of South Carolina
- Estes Kefauver, Representative, U.S. senator from Tennessee and 1956 Democratic vice presidential nominee
- Robert S. Kerr, Senator from Oklahoma (1949-1963), Governor of Oklahoma (1943-1947)
- Earl Long, three-term Louisiana governor
- Huey P. Long, Louisiana governor and U.S. senator
- John McClellan, Representative and U.S. senator from Arkansas
- Larry McDonald, Former representative from Georgia
- Sam Rayburn, Congressman from Texas and longest-serving speaker of the U.S. House of Representatives
- Ann Richards, second female governor of Texas
- Terry Sanford, U.S. senator and governor from North Carolina
- John Stennis, U.S. senator from Mississippi
- Benjamin Tillman, governor and senator of South Carolina
- George Wallace, governor of Alabama, American Independent Party candidate for president in 1968, ran for the Democratic presidential nomination in 1964, 1972, and 1976
- Ralph Yarborough, U.S. senator from Texas

=== 21st-century Southern Democrats (deceased) ===
- Reubin Askew, governor of Florida and 1984 United States presidential candidate
- Lloyd Bentsen, Representative and U.S. senator from Texas, Secretary of the Treasury, and Democratic candidate for vice president in 1988
- Kathleen Blanco, governor of Louisiana
- David Boren, Senator from Oklahoma and Governor of Oklahoma
- Dale Bumpers, U.S. senator from Arkansas and Governor of Arkansas
- Robert Byrd, Representative, U.S. senator from West Virginia, presidential candidate, 1976
- Max Cleland, U.S. senator from Georgia
- Martha Layne Collins, Governor of Kentucky and chair of the 1984 Democratic National Convention
- Edwin Edwards, Representative and Governor of Louisiana
- Wendell Ford, governor of and senator from Kentucky
- Bob Graham, U.S. senator from Florida and Governor of Florida
- Kay Hagan, U.S. senator from North Carolina
- Fritz Hollings, U.S. senator from South Carolina, Governor of South Carolina, 1984 United States presidential candidate
- J. Bennett Johnston, U.S. senator from Louisiana
- John Lewis, U.S. representative from Georgia and civil rights leader
- Lester Maddox, governor of Georgia
- Zell Miller, U.S. senator from Georgia and Georgia governor
- David Pryor, Representative, U.S. senator from Arkansas and Governor of Arkansas
- Strom Thurmond, U.S. senator from South Carolina and Governor of South Carolina (Democrat until 1964), States' Right candidate (Dixiecrat) for president in 1948

=== 21st-century Southern Democrats (living) ===
- Roy Barnes, Governor of Georgia
- John Barrow, U.S. representative from Georgia
- Mike Beebe, Governor of Arkansas
- Steve Beshear, Governor of Kentucky
- John Breaux, Representative and U.S. senator from Louisiana
- Phil Bredesen, Governor of Tennessee
- Ben Chandler, Attorney General of Kentucky and Congressman from Kentucky
- Travis Childers, U.S. representative from Mississippi
- John Bel Edwards, Governor of Louisiana
- John Edwards, U.S. senator from North Carolina, 2004 Democratic vice presidential nominee, Democratic presidential candidate in 2004 and 2008.
- Gwen Graham, U.S. representative for Florida's 2nd congressional district from 2015 to 2017 and candidate for Governor of Florida
- Brad Henry, Governor of Oklahoma
- James Hovis Hodges, Governor of South Carolina
- Doug Jones, former U.S. senator from Alabama
- Mary Landrieu, former U.S. senator from Louisiana
- Al Lawson, U.S. representative for Florida's 5th congressional district from 2017 to 2023
- Blanche Lincoln, Representative and U.S. senator from Arkansas
- Martin O'Malley, Governor of Maryland
- Joe Manchin, governor of West Virginia, U.S. senator from West Virginia (2010-2025), became an Independent in 2024
- Bill Nelson, Representative, U.S. senator from Florida
- Ralph Northam, Governor of Virginia
- Sam Nunn, U.S. senator from Georgia
- Paul Patton, Governor of Kentucky
- Bev Perdue, 73rd governor of North Carolina
- Sonny Perdue, Governor of Georgia (was once a Democrat, now Republican)
- Mark Pryor, U.S. senator from Arkansas
- Jim Webb, U.S. senator from Virginia and Secretary of the Navy, 2016 Democratic presidential candidate (once a Republican)
- Douglas Wilder, Virginia governor, first African-American ever elected governor in the U.S., tried to go for the Democratic presidential nomination in 1991, but eventually withdrew in 1992

== Southern Democratic presidential tickets ==
At various times, registered Democrats from the South broke with the national party to nominate their own presidential and vice presidential candidates, generally in opposition to civil rights measures supported by the national nominees. There was at least one Southern Democratic effort in every presidential election from 1944 until 1968, besides 1952. On some occasions, such as in 1948 with Strom Thurmond, these candidates have been listed on the ballot in some states as the nominee of the Democratic Party. George Wallace of Alabama was in presidential politics as a conservative Democrat except 1968, when he left the party and ran as an independent. Running as the nominees of the American Independent Party, the Wallace ticket won 5 states. Its best result was in Alabama, where it received 65.9% of the vote. Wallace was the official Democratic nominee in Alabama and Hubert Humphrey was listed as the "National Democratic" candidate.

Year	Presidential nominee	Home state	Previous positions	Vice presidential nominee	Home state	Previous positions	Votes	Notes
1860	John C. Breckinridge	Kentucky	Member of the U.S. House of Representatives from Kentucky's 8th congressional district (1851–1855); Vice President of the United States (1857–1861)	Joseph Lane	Oregon	Governor of Oregon (1849–1850; 1853); Member of the U.S. House of Representatives from Oregon Territory's at-large congressional district (1851–1859); United States Senator from Oregon (1859–1861)	848,019 (18.1%); 72 EV	
1944	Unpledged electors						143,238 (0.3%); 0 EV	
1948	Strom Thurmond	South Carolina	Member of the South Carolina Senate (1933–1938); Governor of South Carolina (1947–1951)	Fielding L. Wright	Mississippi	Lieutenant Governor of Mississippi (1944–1946); Governor of Mississippi (1946–1952)	1,175,930 (2.4%); 39 EV	
1956	Unpledged electors						196,145 (0.3%); 0 EV	
1956	T. Coleman Andrews	Virginia	Commissioner of Internal Revenue (1953–1955)	Thomas H. Werdel	California	Member of the California State Assembly from the 39th district (1943–1947); Member of the U.S. House of Representatives from California's 10th congressional district (1949–1953)	107,929 (0.2%); 0 EV	
1956	Walter Burgwyn Jones	Alabama	Judge; Member of the Alabama House of Representatives (1919–1921)	Herman Talmadge	Georgia	Governor of Georgia (1947; 1948–1955)	0 (0.0%); 1 EV	
1960	Unpledged electors						610,409 (0.4%); 15 EV	
1960	Orval Faubus	Arkansas	Governor of Arkansas (1955–1967)	John G. Crommelin	Alabama	United States Navy Rear Admiral; Candidate for United States Senator from Alabama (1950, 1954, 1956)	44,984 (0.1%); 0 EV	
1964	Unpledged electors						210,732 (0.3%); 0 EV	

== See also ==
- Blue Dog Democrats
- Boll weevil (politics)
- Bourbon Democrat
- Conservative Democrat
- Democrat in Name Only
- Democratic Party history
- Jeffersonian democracy
- Democratic Leadership Council
- Democratic Party
- Ku Klux Klan
- National Democratic Party
- New Democrats
- Rockefeller Republican
- Yellow dog Democrats
- Solid South
- Straight-Out Democratic Party

== Notes ==
^{b} South of the Mason–Dixon line Carter won just 34 electoral votes – his own Georgia, plus Delaware, Maryland, and District of Columbia.
