= Harvey Cloyd Philpott =

American politician

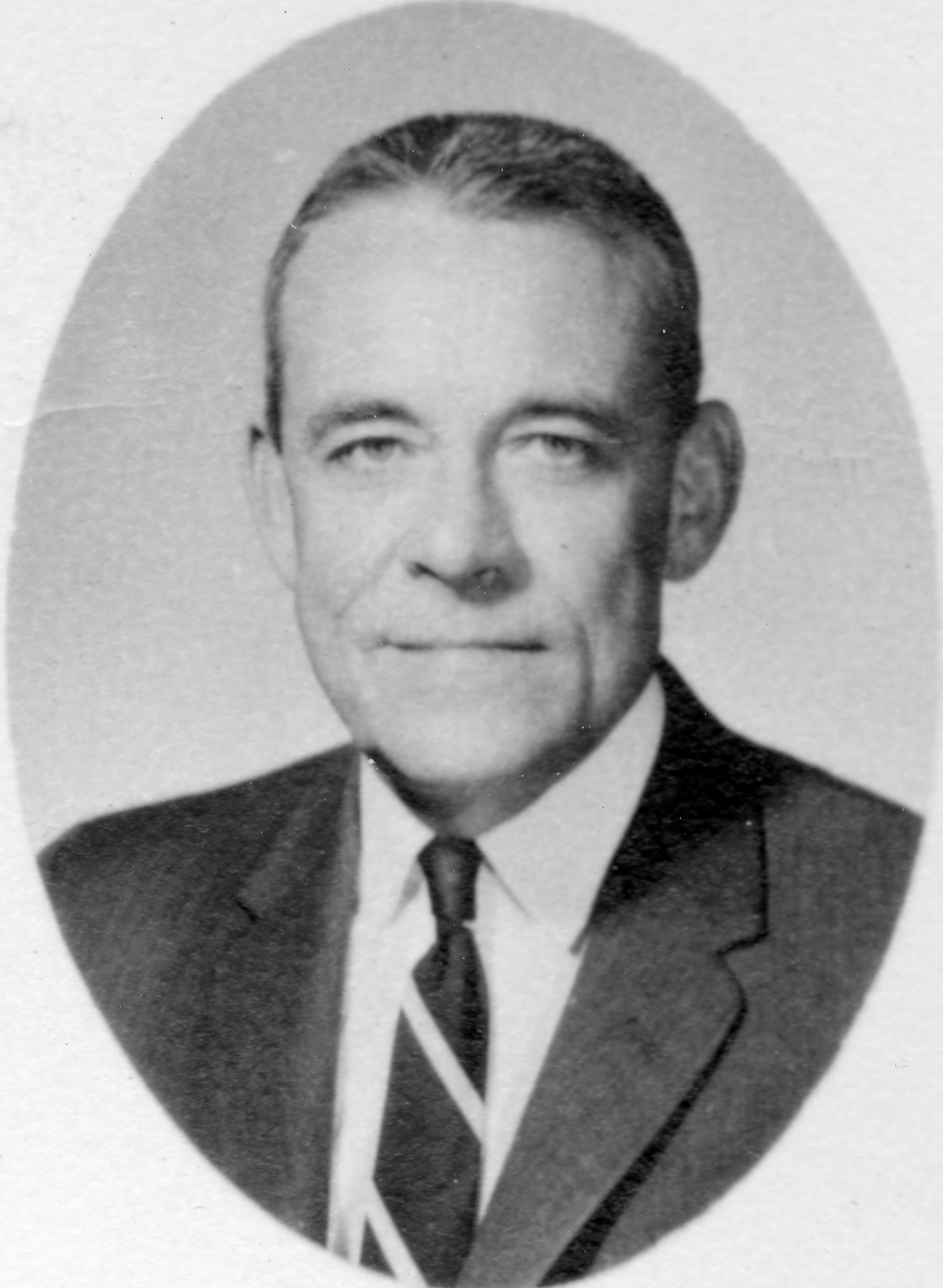

24th Lieutenant Governor of North Carolina
- In office January 5, 1961 – August 19, 1961
- Governor: Terry Sanford
- Preceded by: Luther E. Barnhardt
- Succeeded by: Robert W. Scott

Member of the North Carolina House of Representatives
- In office 1953–1959

Mayor of Lexington, North Carolina
- In office 1945–1949

Personal details
- Born: April 6, 1909 Bassett, Virginia, United States
- Died: August 19, 1961 (aged 52) Winston-Salem, North Carolina, United States
- Party: Democratic Party

Harvey Cloyd Philpott (April 6, 1909 – August 19, 1961) was an American businessman and politician who served as the 24th Lieutenant Governor of North Carolina in 1961. Philpott grew up in Lexington, North Carolina. Following the completion of his education, he rose to become president and chairman of the board of the United Furniture Corporation. He held several local political offices before being elected to a seat in the North Carolina House of Representatives in 1953 as a Democrat.

During his tenure he served on the Pearsall Committee and played a key role in the passage of a state minimum wage law. He left the House in 1959 and in 1960 was elected Lieutenant Governor of North Carolina. In his short time in the latter office, Philpott was a key ally in the legislature for Governor Terry Sanford. Sanford originally wished that Philpott would succeed him as governor, but this was cut short by Philpott's sudden death eight months into his term.

== Early life ==
Harvey Cloyd Philpott was born on April 6, 1909, in Bassett, Virginia, United States to Benjamin Cabell Philpott Sr. and Daisy (Hundley) Philpott. In 1920, Cloyd's father purchased a bankrupt furniture factory in Lexington, North Carolina, and moved the family there, founding the United Furniture Corporation. Cloyd attended Lexington High School from 1921 until 1925. Thereafter he attended Eastman Business College and the Virginia Military Institute. While he was at the latter institution, he was a cadet captain of Company C, edited the school newspaper and was president of the North Carolina Club. He graduated in 1929.

On June 11, 1931, Philpott married Frances Adelaide Thompson. They had three children. He was a captain in the Lexington Company of the North Carolina State Guard from 1941 to 1946.

== Business career ==
While he was a high school student, Philpott worked in his father's furniture business. After completing his education, he entered the furniture industry, working in various departments of the United Furniture Corporation and as its secretary-treasurer. He eventually rose to become president of the company. In 1955, following the death of his father, Philpott was appointed chairman of the board of United Furniture Corporation. The following year the company, under his direction, launched a new subsidiary, Philpott Furniture Corporation, of which he also became president. He worked one term as president of the Southern Furniture Manufacturer's Association.

In 1956 and 1961, the board of the governors of the Chicago-based American Furniture Mart declared him "Furniture Man of the Year". He also was on the board of directors of the Commercial Bank of Lexington and the Mutual Savings and Loan Association in Lexington. From 1946 to 1959 he wason the board of trustees of the Baptist Children's Homes of North Carolina.

== Political career ==
=== Local offices ===
In 1934 Philpott was elected to the Lexington School Board. He later attributed his interest in politics to his time on the school board. He was on the board until 1945, acting as chairman for the last two years. In 1945 he was elected Mayor of Lexington. He held the office for four years, and thereafter was on the Lexington Utilities Committee until 1956.

=== Legislative career ===
Philpott as a Representative, circa 1953

In 1953, Philpott was elected to the North Carolina House of Representatives. Over the course of his tenure he was on various House committees, including those on Agriculture, Education, Roads and Highway Safety, Appropriations, and Finance.

On June 21, 1955, Governor Luther H. Hodges added Philpott to the North Carolina Advisory Committee on Education—commonly dubbed the Pearsall Committee after its chairman, Thomas J. Pearsall. The committee's task was to create the state's response to the United States Supreme Court's decision in Brown v. Board of Education to mandate the racial integration of public schools. It released its recommendations to the governor in early 1956, advising the state to respect the legality of the Supreme Court's decision but urging the government to refrain from compelling white children to attend integrated schools and establish grants to allow for white children to enroll in segregated white schools. In July 1956, Governor Hodges, heeding the advice of the Pearsall Committee, called the North Carolina General Assembly into special session to discuss its proposals. Philpott joined three other legislators in introducing a joint resolution "of condemnation and protest against oppressive usurpation of power by the Supreme Court of the United States."

In 1957, Philpott urged the legislature to adopt a state minimum wage law, arguing that the previous adoption of a federal minimum wage law had spurred economic growth in the American South. Although many conservatives and businessmen were opposed to the measure, Philpott's support helped ensure that a minimum wage statute was adopted. In 1958, he chaired the Commission of Reorganization of State Government and was finance director for the North Carolina Democratic Party during that year's election cycle. He supported much of Hodges' legislative program during the 1959 Assembly session, but vacated his House seat later that year.

=== Lieutenant governor ===
On January 29, 1960, Philpott declared his candidacy for the office of Lieutenant Governor of North Carolina. In his announcement he declared that he would seek to raise the average income of state residents to match the national earnings average. Terry Sanford, who was launching a candidacy to become Governor of North Carolina, had considered making Philpott his campaign manager until Philpott announced his own bid for office. The two became friends over the course of their respective bids, and Philpott endorsed Sanford's plans to increase spending on public education. Philpott enjoyed the tacit support of Sanford's campaign manager, Bert Bennett, and the retiring governor Hodges. In the Democratic primary election he faced C. V. Henkel. He earned 238,353 votes to Henkel's 175,150, thus securing the Democratic nomination. In the general election he faced Republican S. Clyde Eggers. He won 765,519 votes to his opponent's 532,445 votes. Sanford also won his election and became governor. The two were sworn in on January 5, 1961.

As lieutenant governor, Philpott had the responsibility of making committee appointments in the North Carolina Senate and had considerable influence over the body's workflow. Instead of honoring the tradition of awarding committee chairs to senators with seniority, he appointed first-term Senator Thomas Jackson White—his friend—as Chairman of the Committee on Finance. The 1961 session of the General Assembly had the responsibility of redrawing Congressional districts throughout the state in wake of the 1960 United States census. Philpott made an agreement with presumptive with Speaker of the State House of Representatives Joseph M. Hunt Jr. before the opening of the session to appoint special committees to draft relevant bills on the matter in each respective house. Contrary to precedent, the committees consisted of 12 Democrats each with no Republicans represented.

Philpott acted as Sanford's main ally in the Senate, and Sanford later credited him with helping to convince the General Assembly to raise taxes to increase education funding. He hoped to support Philpott in a bid to succeed him as governor in 1964. Philpott went on a trip to Hawaii during the last week of the 1961 legislative session, leaving the responsibility of presiding over the Senate to the president pro tempore.

== Death ==
On the morning of August 16, 1961, at his country residence near High Rock Lake, Philpott became stricken by severe chest and abdominal pains. He walked to a neighboring doctor's cabin, and the doctor called for an ambulance which transported him to N.C. Baptist Hospital in Winston-Salem. Doctors later determined that he was suffering from aortic dissection. He died at 5:45 PM on August 19 at the hospital. A funeral was held on August 21 in Lexington at the First Baptist Church and Philpott was subsequently buried in Forest Hill Memorial Park.

Many newspaper editorials commented on the lost potential of a Philpott candidacy for governor in 1964. Philpott was the first Lieutenant Governor of North Carolina to die in office during the 20th century, and his death left the office vacant until the election of 1964, as there was no constitutional mechanism to fill the vacancy. His death also prompted questions and debates concerning the gubernatorial order of succession, as it became unclear who would hypothetically assume the governor's office if the Governor of North Carolina died while there was no sitting lieutenant governor. (Note: At the request of Sanford, North Carolina Attorney General T. Wade Bruton wrote an advisory opinion on the issues of the lieutenant gubernatorial vacancy, and he concluded that in the event of a simultaneous vacancy in both top offices the Senate would elect the governor.) State Senator T. Clarence Stone assumed the responsibility of presiding over the Senate. Philpott's family and friends established a scholarship fund in his name for aspiring Davidson County college students.

== Works cited ==
- Batchelor, John E. (2015). Race and Education in North Carolina: From Segregation to Desegregation. Baton Rouge: Louisiana University Press. ISBN 9780807161371.
- Cheney, John L. Jr., ed. (1979). North Carolina Manual. Raleigh: North Carolina Secretary of State. OCLC 244121342.
- Christensen, Rob (2010). The Paradox of Tar Heel Politics: The Personalities, Elections, and Events That Shaped Modern North Carolina (second ed.). Chapel Hill: The University of North Carolina Press. ISBN 978-0-8078-7151-5.
- Covington, Howard E. Jr; Ellis, Marion A. (1999). Terry Sanford: Politics, Progress, and Outrageous Ambitions. Durham: Duke University Press. ISBN 9780822323563.
- Eamon, Tom (2014). The Making of a Southern Democracy: North Carolina Politics from Kerr Scott to Pat McCrory. Chapel Hill, North Carolina: UNC Press Books. ISBN 9781469606972. - See profile at Google Books
- Jewell, Malcolm Edwin, ed. (1962). The Politics of Reapportionment. New York: Atherton Press. OCLC 561581714.
- North Carolina Manual. Raleigh: North Carolina Secretary of State. 1961. OCLC 244106586.
- Reed, Weston C. (1973). Love in Action: The Story of the Baptist Children's Homes of North Carolina. Thomasville: Baptist Children's Homes of North Carolina. OCLC 1048809811.
- Sanford, Terry (1966). But what about the People?. New York City: Harper & Row. OCLC 933852508.

Party political offices
Preceded by Luther E. Barnhardt	Democratic nominee for Lieutenant Governor of North Carolina; 1960	Succeeded by Robert W. Scott
Political offices
Preceded by Luther E. Barnhardt	Lieutenant Governor of North Carolina; 1961	Succeeded by Robert W. Scott
