= Malayan Party =

Parti Malaya
- Abbreviation: MP
- Chairman: Tan Kee Gak
- Founder: Tan Kee Gak
- Founded: 24 October 1956
- Dissolved: March 1964
- Split from: Malayan Chinese Association (MCA)
- Headquarters: Malacca, Malaysia
- Colours: Black

The Malayan Party (Malay: Parti Malaya, MP) was a political party in Malaysia formed by former Malaysian Chinese Association member Tan Gee Gak.

== History ==
The party was established by Tan Gee Gak on 24 October 1956 in Malacca with the support of the Federation of Chinese Guilds and Associations and the Malacca Chinese Chamber of Commerce (which Tan was president of). Its formation was a response to concerns over the Alliance Party's stance on the constitution being drafted, and the party was deliberately established on United Nations Day to represent its support for the Universal Declaration of Human Rights. It also supported Malacca's status as a crown colony, which allowed Chinese greater rights than the Malay states.

The party won seats in the 1956, 1957 and 1958 local elections in Malacca. Although it failed to win a seat in the 1959 state elections, in the 1959 general elections it won one seat in Parliament, Tan winning in Malacca City. However, the party disbanded in March 1964 when Tan rejoined the Malaysian Chinese Association (MCA), the party he had left to form the MP.

== List of party leaders ==
#	Name	Took office	Left office
1	Tan Kee Gak	24 October 1956	4 March 1964

== Election results ==
=== General elections ===
Election	Leader	Votes	%	Seats	Status
1959	Tan Kee Gak	13,404	0.87%	1 / 104	Opposition

=== State elections ===
State election	State Legislative Assembly		
State election	Selangor	Malacca	Total won / Total contested
1959	0 / 28	0 / 20	0 / 6
