= Lether E. Frazar Memorial Library =

Library in Lake Charles, Louisiana

Coordinates: 30.1781°N 93.2172°W

Lether E. Frazar Memorial Library is a university library in Lake Charles, Louisiana. It is the main library for McNeese State University. It is named for politician and university president Lether Edward Frazar.

In 2019, it signed a Memorandum of Agreement with the U.S. Government Publishing Office (GPO) to become a Preservation Steward for Environmental Protection Agency publications.

As of 2006, 500 items were still missing as a result of Hurricane Katrina.
