= 1972 North Carolina lieutenant gubernatorial election =

Election in North Carolina

- November 7, 1972
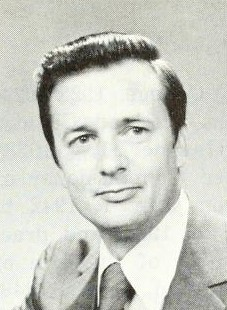

Nominee	Jim Hunt	John A. Walker
Party	Democratic	Republican
Popular vote	812,602	612,002
Percentage	56.69%	42.69%
- County results Hunt: 50–60% 60–70% 70–80% 80–90% Walker: 40–50% 50–60% 60–70% 70–80%
Lieutenant Governor before election
Hoyt Patrick Taylor Jr.
Democratic
Elected Lieutenant Governor
Jim Hunt
Democratic

The 1972 North Carolina lieutenant gubernatorial election was held on November 7, 1972. Democratic nominee Jim Hunt defeated Republican nominee John A. Walker with 56.69% of the vote.

== Primary elections ==
Primary elections were held on May 6, 1972.

=== Democratic primary ===
==== Candidates ====
- Allen C. Barbee, former state representative
- Reginald L. Frazier
- Margaret T. Harper
- Jim Hunt, attorney
- Roy G. Sowers Jr.

==== Results ====
Democratic primary results
Party	Candidate	Votes	%
Democratic	Jim Hunt	329,727	43.77
Democratic	Roy G. Sowers Jr.	177,016	23.50
Democratic	Margaret T. Harper	151,819	20.15
Democratic	Allen C. Barbee	51,602	6.85
Democratic	Reginald L. Frazier	43,228	5.74
Total votes		753,392	100.00

=== Republican primary ===
==== Candidates ====
- Norman H. Joyner, former state senator
- John A. Walker, businessman

==== Results ====
Republican primary results
Party	Candidate	Votes	%
Republican	John A. Walker	99,361	65.93
Republican	Norman H. Joyner	51,354	34.07
Total votes		150,715	100.00

== General election ==
=== Candidates ===
Major party candidates

- Jim Hunt, Democratic
- John A. Walker, Republican

Other candidates

- Benjamin G. McLendon, American

=== Results ===
1972 North Carolina lieutenant gubernatorial election
Party	Candidate	Votes	%	±%
Democratic	Jim Hunt	812,602	56.69%	
Republican	John A. Walker	612,002	42.69%	
American	Benjamin G. McLendon	8,865	0.62%	
Majority		200,600		
Turnout				
Democratic hold		Swing		
