= 1959 Malayan state elections =

Elections for public office in the states of Malaya

State assembly elections were held in Malaya from 20 May to 24 June 1959. The Alliance Party received over 50% of the vote in every state except Kelantan and Trengganu.

== Results ==
=== Johore ===
Party or alliance		Votes	%	Seats	+/–
Alliance Party	United Malays National Organisation	94,273	45.08	20	+10
Alliance Party	Malayan Chinese Association	40,727	19.47	7	+2
Alliance Party	Malayan Indian Congress	5,217	2.49	1	0
Alliance Party	Total	140,217	67.04	28	+12
Parti Negara		32,288	15.44	0	New
Malayan Peoples'; Socialist Front	Labour Party of Malaya	10,492	5.02	3	+3
Malayan Peoples'; Socialist Front	Parti Ra'ayat	9,919	4.74	0	New
Malayan Peoples'; Socialist Front	Total	20,411	9.76	3	+15
Pan-Malayan Islamic Party		5,471	2.62	0	0
Independents		10,755	5.14	1	+1
Total		209,142	100.00	32	+16
Valid votes		209,142	97.50		
Invalid/blank votes		5,354	2.50		
Total votes		214,496	100.00		
Registered voters/turnout		282,164	76.02		
Source: Almanak Keputusan Pilihan Raya Umum: Parlimen & Dewan Undangan Negeri (1959-1999)

The registered voters above refers to total voters of the contested DUN constituencies. The total electorate of Johore is 219224 voters which includes uncontested DUN of Pontian Kechil

=== Kedah ===
Party or alliance		Votes	%	Seats	+/–
Alliance Party	United Malays National Organisation	103,843	53.32	18	+9
Alliance Party	Malayan Chinese Association	28,522	14.64	5	+2
Alliance Party	Malayan Indian Congress	6,195	3.18	1	New
Alliance Party	Total	138,560	71.14	24	+11
Pan-Malayan Islamic Party		45,979	23.61	0	0
Malayan Peoples'; Socialist Front	Labour Party of Malaya	3,233	1.66	0	New
Malayan Peoples'; Socialist Front	Parti Ra'ayat	2,813	1.44	0	New
Malayan Peoples'; Socialist Front	Total	6,046	3.10	0	New
Parti Negara		3,666	1.88	0	0
Independents		512	0.26	0	0
Total		194,763	100.00	24	+12
Valid votes		194,763	96.03		
Invalid/blank votes		8,062	3.97		
Total votes		202,825	100.00		
Registered voters/turnout		268,025	75.67		
Source: Almanak Keputusan Pilihan Raya Umum: Parlimen & Dewan Undangan Negeri (1959-1999)

Correction for MCA and UMNO votes based on Tindak Malaysia's Github

=== Kelantan ===
Party or alliance		Votes	%	Seats	+/–
Pan-Malayan Islamic Party		114,858	63.79	28	+28
Alliance Party	United Malays National Organisation	42,156	23.41	1	–14
Alliance Party	Malayan Chinese Association	6,353	3.53	1	0
Alliance Party	Total	48,509	26.94	2	New
Parti Negara		9,371	5.20	0	0
Malayan Peoples'; Socialist Front	Labour Party of Malaya	3,730	2.07	0	New
Malayan Peoples'; Socialist Front	Parti Ra'ayat	341	0.19	0	New
Malayan Peoples'; Socialist Front	Total	4,071	2.26	0	New
Independents		3,256	1.81	0	0
Total		180,065	100.00	30	+14
Valid votes		180,065	98.07		
Invalid/blank votes		3,547	1.93		
Total votes		183,612	100.00		
Registered voters/turnout		240,552	76.33		
Source: Almanak Keputusan Pilihan Raya Umum: Parlimen & Dewan Undangan Negeri (1959-1999)

Evidence of association for Parti Rakyat/Labour Party for the candidate of Ulu Kelantan Timor (John William Lind) is limited

=== Malacca ===
Party or alliance		Votes	%	Seats	+/–
Alliance Party	United Malays National Organisation	34,808	48.14	13	+8
Alliance Party	Malayan Chinese Association	13,582	18.79	7	+4
Alliance Party	Total	48,390	66.93	20	+12
Pan-Malayan Islamic Party		10,464	14.47	0	0
Malayan Peoples'; Socialist Front	Labour Party of Malaya	4,846	6.70	0	New
Malayan Peoples'; Socialist Front	Parti Ra'ayat	3,369	4.66	0	New
Malayan Peoples'; Socialist Front	Total	8,215	11.36	0	0
Malayan Party		4,993	6.91	0	New
Independents		238	0.33	0	0
Total		72,300	100.00	20	+12
Valid votes		72,300	98.22		
Invalid/blank votes		1,308	1.78		
Total votes		73,608	100.00		
Registered voters/turnout		93,740	78.52		
Source: Almanak Keputusan Pilihan Raya Umum: Parlimen & Dewan Undangan Negeri (1959-1999)

=== Negri Sembilan ===
Party or alliance		Votes	%	Seats	+/–
Alliance Party	United Malays National Organisation	30,006	34.54	11	+2
Alliance Party	Malayan Chinese Association	14,734	16.96	7	+5
Alliance Party	Malayan Indian Congress	3,752	4.32	2	+1
Alliance Party	Total	48,492	55.81	20	+8
Malayan Peoples'; Socialist Front	Labour Party of Malaya	13,121	15.10	3	+3
Malayan Peoples'; Socialist Front	Parti Ra'ayat	2,392	2.75	0	New
Malayan Peoples'; Socialist Front	Total	15,513	17.86	3	+3
Pan-Malayan Islamic Party		9,941	11.44	0	0
Parti Negara		3,438	3.96	0	0
Independents		9,499	10.93	1	+1
Total		86,883	100.00	24	+12
Valid votes		86,883	97.71		
Invalid/blank votes		2,033	2.29		
Total votes		88,916	100.00		
Registered voters/turnout		111,336	79.86		
Source: Almanak Keputusan Pilihan Raya Umum: Parlimen & Dewan Undangan Negeri (1959-1999)

Correction was made for UMNO and MCA votes based on Tindak Malaysia's Github

=== Pahang ===
Party or alliance		Votes	%	Seats	+/–
Alliance Party	United Malays National Organisation	39,964	49.53	17	+3
Alliance Party	Malayan Chinese Association	10,006	12.40	6	+4
Alliance Party	Malayan Indian Congress	1,336	1.66	0	0
Alliance Party	Total	51,366	63.66	23	+7
Pan-Malayan Islamic Party		18,165	22.51	0	0
Malayan Peoples' Socialist Front	Parti Ra'ayat	4,665	5.78	0	New
Malayan Peoples' Socialist Front	Labour Party of Malaya	1,507	1.87	0	New
Malayan Peoples' Socialist Front	Total	6,172	7.65	0	0
Independents		5,049	6.26	1	+1
Total		80,692	100.00	24	+9
Valid votes		80,692	97.63		
Invalid/blank votes		1,956	2.37		
Total votes		82,648	100.00		
Registered voters/turnout		105,940	78.01		
Source: Almanak Keputusan Pilihan Raya Umum: Parlimen & Dewan Undangan Negeri (1959-1999)

Correction was made for UMNO and MCA votes based on Tindak Malaysia's Github

Registered voters shown above refers total voters for contested constituencies. Total Electorate of Pahang is 109535 which includes uncontested DUN constituency of Bandar Bentong

=== Penang ===
Party or alliance		Votes	%	Seats	+/–
Alliance Party	United Malays National Organisation	36,109	27.15	10	+3
Alliance Party	Malayan Chinese Association	27,468	20.65	6	+1
Alliance Party	Malayan Indian Congress	4,341	3.26	1	–1
Alliance Party	Total	67,918	51.06	17	+3
Malayan Peoples' Socialist Front	Labour Party of Malaya	33,902	25.49	7	+7
Malayan Peoples' Socialist Front	Parti Ra'ayat	5,167	3.88	0	New
Malayan Peoples' Socialist Front	Total	39,069	29.37	7	+7
Pan-Malayan Islamic Party		10,772	8.10	0	0
People's Progressive Party		7,612	5.72	0	0
Parti Negara		1,124	0.85	0	0
Independents		6,518	4.90	0	0
Total		133,013	100.00	24	+14
Valid votes		133,013	98.09		
Invalid/blank votes		2,596	1.91		
Total votes		135,609	100.00		
Registered voters/turnout		182,515	74.30		
Source: Almanak Keputusan Pilihan Raya Umum: Parlimen & Dewan Undangan Negeri (1959-1999)

Registered voters shown above is total voters for contested constituencies. Total Electorate for Penang is 188661 which includes uncontested DUN constituency of Dhoby Ghaut. Evidence for Labour Party/Parti Rakyat association for DUN candidate of Balik Pulau (Th'ng Ang Wah) is limited.

=== Perak ===
Party or alliance		Votes	%	Seats	+/–
Alliance Party	United Malays National Organisation	95,219	31.39	21	+10
Alliance Party	Malayan Chinese Association	65,160	21.48	9	+3
Alliance Party	Malayan Indian Congress	5,413	1.78	1	-2
Alliance Party	Total	165,792	54.65	31	+11
People's Progressive Party		73,792	24.33	8	0
Pan-Malayan Islamic Party		46,280	15.26	1	0
Malayan Peoples' Socialist Front	Parti Ra'ayat	7,852	2.59	0	0
Malayan Peoples' Socialist Front	Labour Party of Malaya	3,879	1.28	0	New
Malayan Peoples' Socialist Front	Total	11,731	3.87	0	0
Independents		5,753	1.90	0	0
Total		303,348	100.00	40	+19
Valid votes		303,348	97.77		
Invalid/blank votes		6,918	2.23		
Total votes		310,266	100.00		
Registered voters/turnout		450,094	68.93		
Source: Almanak Keputusan Pilihan Raya Umum: Parlimen & Dewan Undangan Negeri (1959-1999)

The evidence for Labour Party/Parti Rakyat association for DUN candidate of Larut (Haji Harun bin Musa) is limited

=== Perlis ===
Party or alliance		Votes	%	Seats	+/–
Alliance Party	United Malays National Organisation	16,015	52.36	10	+1
Alliance Party	Malayan Chinese Association	3,506	11.46	2	New
Alliance Party	Total	19,521	63.82	12	+1
Pan-Malayan Islamic Party		9,697	31.70	0	0
Malayan Peoples' Socialist Front	Parti Ra'ayat	393	1.28	0	New
Independents		978	3.20	0	0
Total		30,589	100.00	12	+3
Valid votes		30,589	97.94		
Invalid/blank votes		642	2.06		
Total votes		31,231	100.00		
Registered voters/turnout		38,355	81.43		
Source: Almanak Keputusan Pilihan Raya Umum: Parlimen & Dewan Undangan Negeri (1959-1999) Tindak Malaysia Github

=== Selangor ===
Party or alliance		Votes	%	Seats	+/–
Alliance Party	United Malays National Organisation	55,217	30.23	14	+6
Alliance Party	Malayan Chinese Association	41,304	22.61	8	+5
Alliance Party	Malayan Indian Congress	8,613	4.72	1	–1
Alliance Party	Total	105,134	57.56	23	+10
Malayan Peoples'; Socialist Front	Parti Ra'ayat	16,733	9.16	2	New
Malayan Peoples'; Socialist Front	Labour Party of Malaya	15,563	8.52	1	+1
Malayan Peoples'; Socialist Front	Total	32,296	17.68	3	+1
Pan-Malayan Islamic Party		21,273	11.65	0	0
People's Progressive Party		7,177	3.93	0	0
Parti Negara		3,742	2.05	0	0
Malayan Party		2,567	1.41	0	New
Independents		10,476	5.74	2	+2
Total		182,665	100.00	28	+15
Valid votes		182,665	97.49		
Invalid/blank votes		4,711	2.51		
Total votes		187,376	100.00		
Registered voters/turnout		263,510	71.11		
Source: Almanak Keputusan Pilihan Raya Umum: Parlimen & Dewan Undangan Negeri (1959-1999)

Registered voters shown above is the total voters for contested constituencies. Total Electorate of Selangor is 270780 which includes uncontested DUN constituency of Kuala Kubu

=== Trengganu ===
Party or alliance		Votes	%	Seats	+/–
Pan-Malayan Islamic Party		29,125	36.88	13	New
Alliance Party	United Malays National Organisation	24,657	31.22	5	-10
Alliance Party	Malayan Chinese Association	3,149	3.99	2	New
Alliance Party	Total	27,806	35.21	7	-10
Parti Negara		12,846	16.27	4	0
Malayan Peoples' Socialist Front	Parti Ra'ayat	6,404	8.11	0	New
Independents		2,793	3.54	0	0
Total		78,974	100.00	24	+9
Valid votes		78,974	96.36		
Invalid/blank votes		2,984	3.64		
Total votes		81,958	100.00		
Registered voters/turnout		114,904	71.33		
Source: Almanak Keputusan Pilihan Raya Umum: Parlimen & Dewan Undangan Negeri (1959-1999)Tindak Malaysia Github
