= C. E. Barham =

American politician (1904–1972)

Member of the Louisiana State Senate
- In office 1948–1952

43rd Lieutenant Governor of Louisiana
- In office 1952–1956
- Governor: Robert F. Kennon
- Preceded by: Bill Dodd
- Succeeded by: Lether Edward Frazar

Personal details
- Born: September 28, 1904
- Died: February 23, 1972 (aged 67)
- Party: Democratic
- Children: Charles C. Barham
- Education: Northwestern State University; Louisiana State University

C. E. Barham (September 28, 1904 – February 23, 1972), nicknamed "Juicy" and "Cap", was an American politician. He served as the 43rd lieutenant governor of Louisiana from 1952 to 1956.

== Life and career ==
Barham attended Northwestern State University and Louisiana State University.

In 1948, Barham was elected to the Louisiana State Senate, serving until 1952, when he elected to the Louisiana lieutenant governorship, serving under Governor Robert F. Kennon. He served until 1956, when he was succeeded by Lether Edward Frazar.

Barham died in February 1972, at the age of 67.

Party political offices
Preceded by Bill Dodd	Democratic nominee for Lieutenant Governor of Louisiana; 1952	Succeeded by Lether Edward Frazar
