= 1956 Saudi Arabian municipal elections =

Municipal elections were held in Saudi Arabia in 1956.

== Results ==
In Qatif the council was dissolved on 5 May and previous members were not allowed to run for re-election. The election was largely a contest between representatives of the old town (Qala'a) and young activists from the surrounding areas. The result was declared to be a tie, with the young activists winning five seats. However, following the arrests of some elected councillors after strikes by Aramco workers and differences between councillors preventing the council functioning, it was dissolved after two months and fresh elections ordered.
