= Norman Joyner =

American politician (1922–1992)

The Reverend Norman Joyner

Member of the North Carolina Senate from the 26th district
- In office November 5, 1968 – January 1, 1973
- Preceded by: C. V. Henkel
- Succeeded by: Kennedy H. Sharpe

Personal details
- Born: Norman Hepler Joyner; August 14, 1922
- Died: February 29, 1992 (aged 69); Statesville, North Carolina
- Political party: Republican
- Spouse: Ruby Cook (m. 1941)
- Children: 5
- Education: Wake Forest College; Southern Baptist Theological Seminary
- Occupation: Pastor; politician

Military service
- Branch/service: United States Navy
- Battles/wars: World War II

Norman Hepler Joyner (August 14, 1922 – February 29, 1992) was an American politician.

After graduating from Wake Forest College in 1948, Joyner earned a bachelor's of divinity from Southern Baptist Theological Seminary. Between 1966 and 1968, Joyner was a member of the Iredell County board of commissioners. By 1969, he had been elected to the North Carolina Senate. While serving as a state senator, Joyner was selected to attend the 1972 National Forum of State Legislators on Older Americans, and contested the Republican Party primary held for the lieutenant gubernatorial election that year.

Joyner was married to the former Ruby Cook on November 22, 1941, with whom he had three sons and two daughters. He died on February 29, 1992, in Statesville, North Carolina.
