= 1956 Wisconsin lieutenant gubernatorial election =

- November 6, 1956
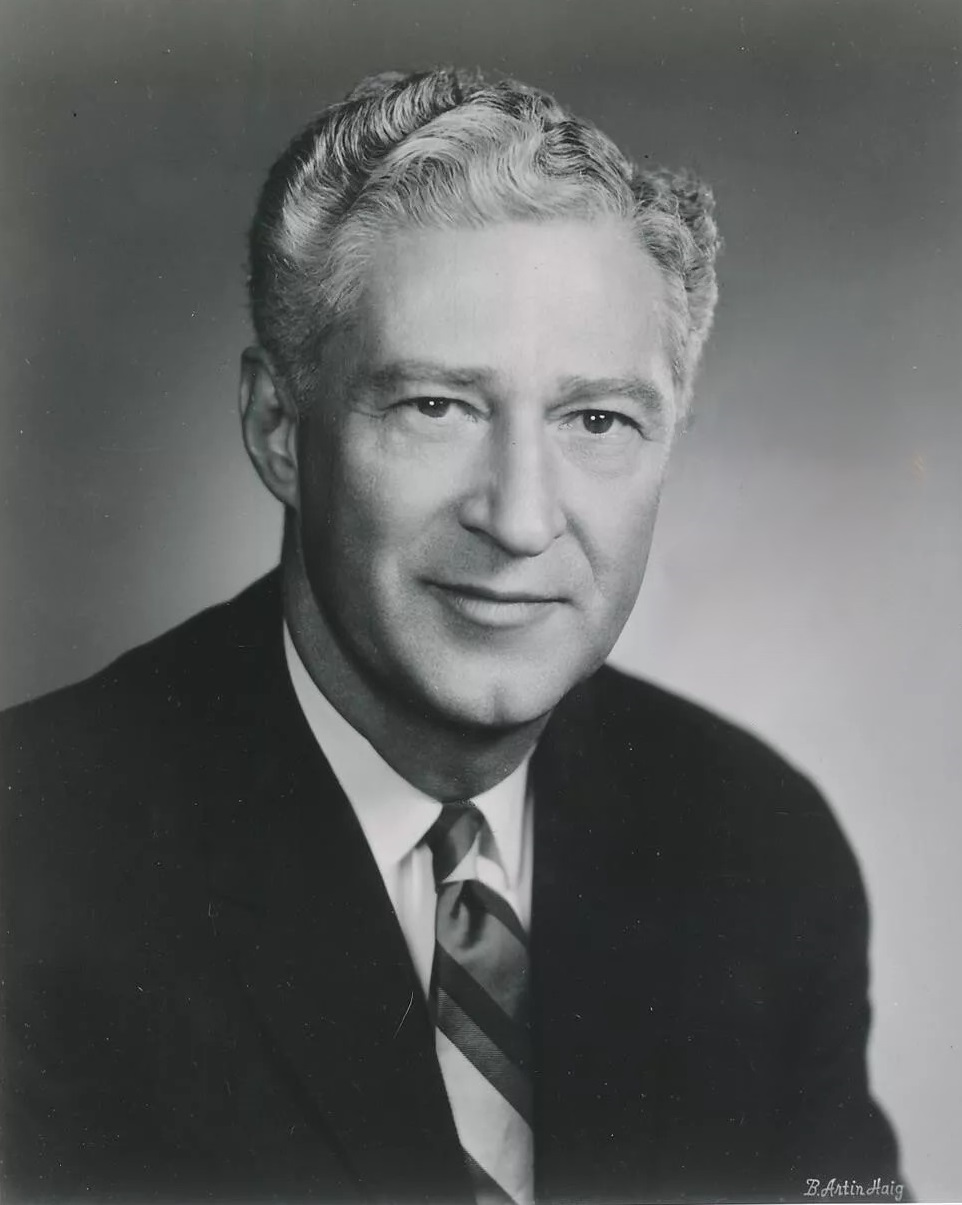

Nominee	Warren P. Knowles	William A. Schmidt
Party	Republican	Democratic
Popular vote	822,780	684,844
Percentage	54.57%	45.42%
Lieutenant Governor before election
Warren P. Knowles
Republican
Elected Lieutenant Governor
Warren P. Knowles
Republican

The 1956 Wisconsin lieutenant gubernatorial election was held on November 6, 1956, in order to elect the lieutenant governor of Wisconsin. Incumbent Republican lieutenant governor Warren P. Knowles defeated Democratic nominee and incumbent member of the Wisconsin Senate William A. Schmidt.

== Democratic primary ==
The Democratic primary election was held on September 11, 1956. Incumbent member of the Wisconsin Senate William A. Schmidt received a majority of the votes (53.21%) over the Democratic nominee in the previous election and attorney Edwin Larkin, and was thus elected as the nominee for the general election.

=== Results ===
1956 Democratic lieutenant gubernatorial primary
Party	Candidate	Votes	%
Democratic	William A. Schmidt	135,843	53.21%
Democratic	Edwin Larkin	119,441	46.79%
Total votes		255,284	100.00%

== General election ==
On election day, November 6, 1956, incumbent Republican lieutenant governor Warren P. Knowles won re-election by a margin of 137,936 votes against his opponent Democratic nominee William A. Schmidt, thereby retaining Republican control over the office of lieutenant governor. Knowles was sworn in for his second term on January 7, 1957.

=== Results ===
Wisconsin lieutenant gubernatorial election, 1956
Party	Candidate	Votes	%
Republican	Warren P. Knowles (incumbent)	822,780	54.57
Democratic	William A. Schmidt	684,844	45.42
	Scattering	43	0.01
Total votes		1,507,667	100.00
Republican hold			
