= 1956 North Carolina lieutenant gubernatorial election =

- November 8, 1956
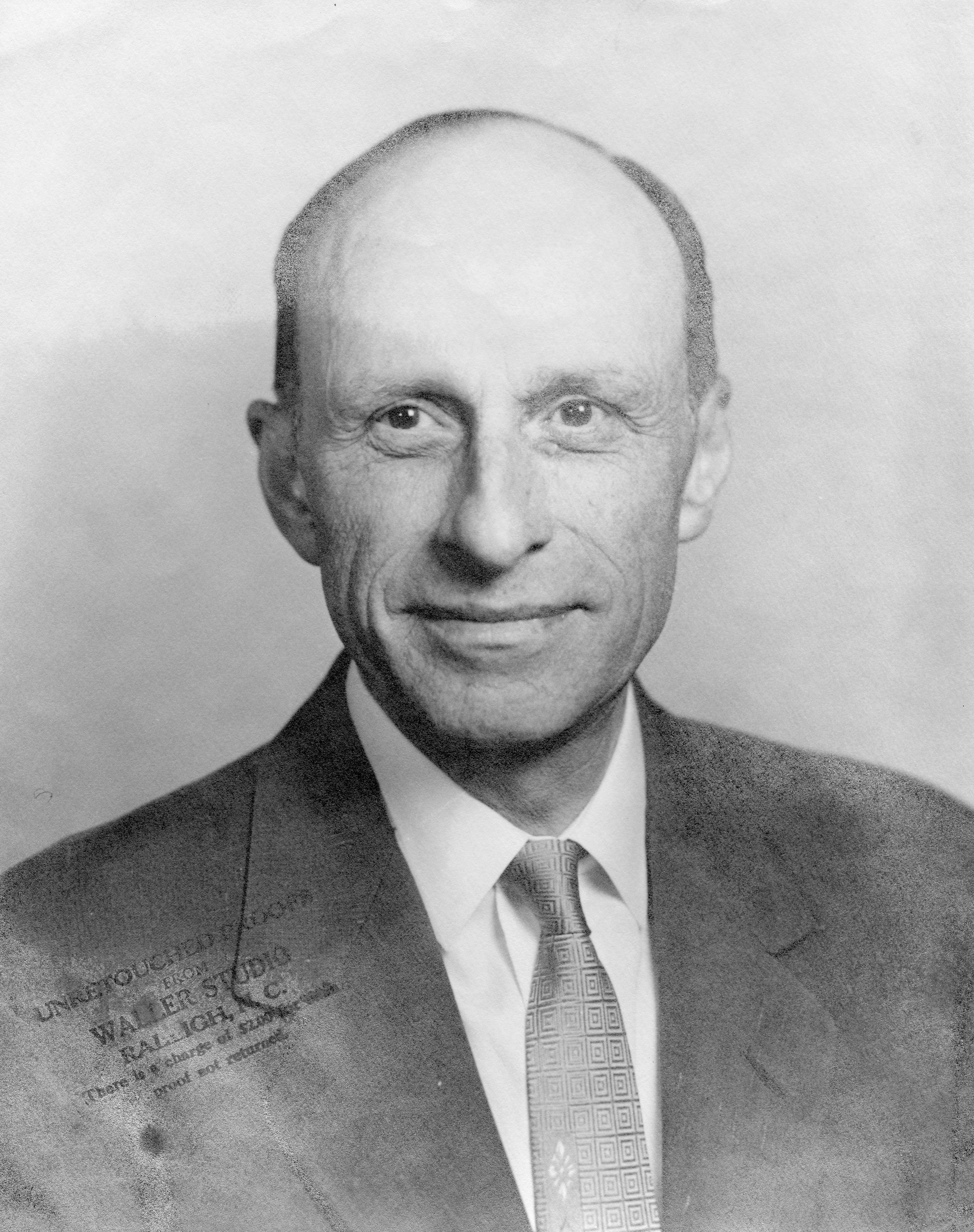

Nominee	Luther E. Barnhardt	Joseph A. Dunn
Party	Democratic	Republican
Popular vote	738,322	368,457
Percentage	66.71%	33.29%
Lieutenant Governor before election
Luther H. Hodges
Democratic
Elected Lieutenant Governor
Luther E. Barnhardt
Democratic

The 1956 North Carolina lieutenant gubernatorial election was held on November 8, 1956. Democratic nominee Luther E. Barnhardt defeated Republican nominee Joseph A. Dunn with 66.71% of the vote.

== Primary elections ==
Primary elections were held on May 26, 1956.

=== Democratic primary ===
==== Candidates ====
- Luther E. Barnhardt, State Senator
- Alonzo C. Edwards, State Representative
- Kidd Brewer
- Gurney P. Hood, former North Carolina Commissioner of Banks
- James V. Whitfield, State Senator

==== Results ====
Democratic primary results
Party	Candidate	Votes	%
Democratic	Luther E. Barnhardt	160,758	37.07
Democratic	Alonzo C. Edwards	124,611	28.74
Democratic	Kidd Brewer	56,227	12.97
Democratic	Gurney P. Hood	54,747	12.63
Democratic	James V. Whitfield	37,275	8.60
Total votes		433,618	100.00

== General election ==
=== Candidates ===
- Luther E. Barnhardt, Democratic
- Joseph A. Dunn, Republican

=== Results ===
1956 North Carolina lieutenant gubernatorial election
Party	Candidate	Votes	%	±%
Democratic	Luther E. Barnhardt	738,322	66.71%	
Republican	Joseph A. Dunn	368,457	33.29%	
Majority		369,865		
Turnout				
Democratic hold		Swing		
