= 1956 South Vietnamese Constitutional Assembly election =

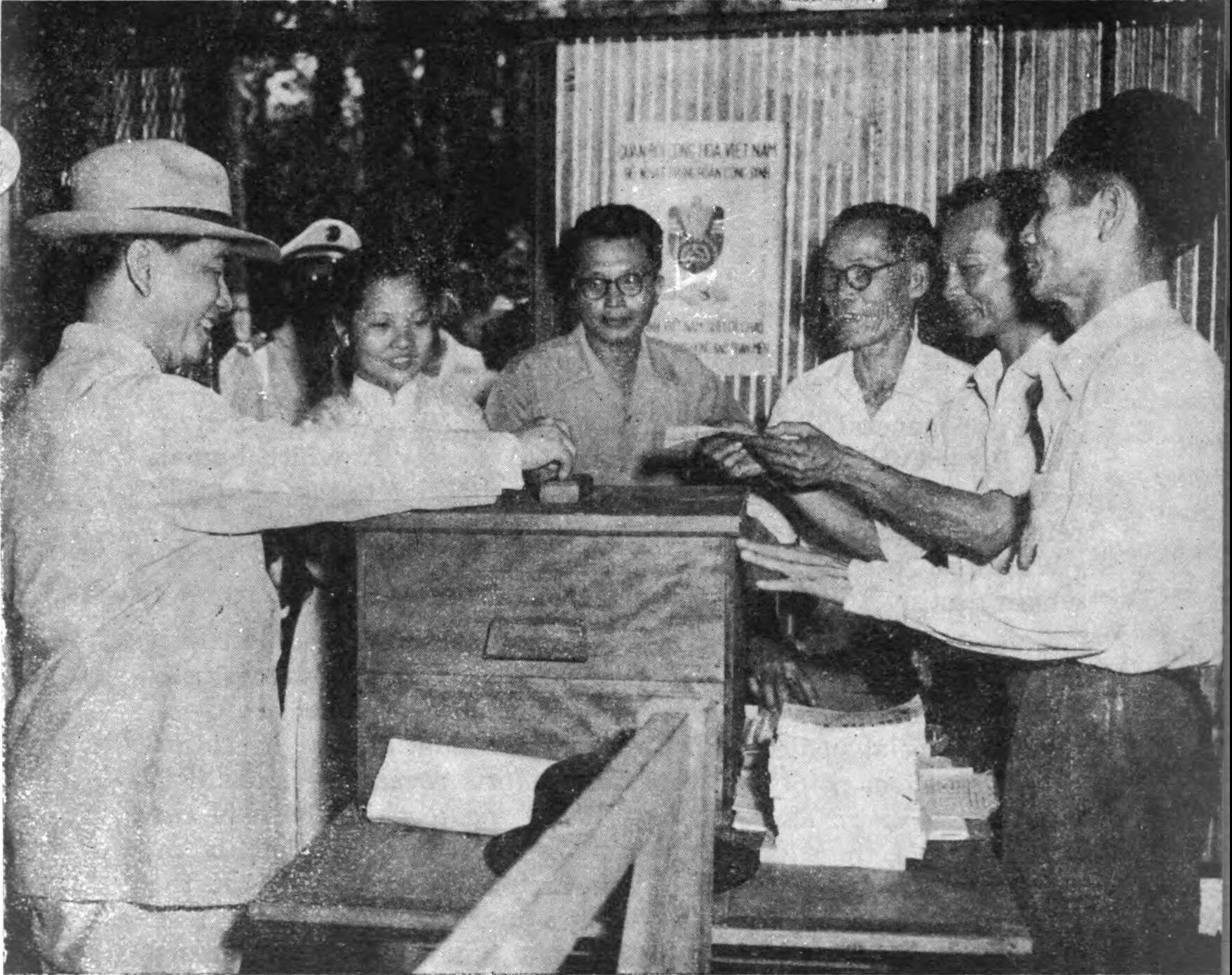
President Ngo Dinh Diem casting his vote on election day

Constitutional Assembly elections were held in South Vietnam on 4 March 1956. A total of 431 candidates contested the 123 seats from all five registered pro-government political parties, with eleven elected as pro-government independents. Edward Miller notes that the election was relatively free and fair in comparison to 1955 referendum, as independent and opposition candidates were allowed to contest the seats and opposition campaigns were allowed. However, campaign materials had to be screened, and the government was allowed to suspend candidates on the basis of their links with the communist Viet Minh and other rebel groups. Two deputies were not permitted to take seats due to electoral violations, making the total number of deputies seated at 121. On 26 October the body was transformed into the National Assembly after the new constitution came into effect.

== Electoral system ==
The 123 members of the Constitutional Assembly were elected by first-past-the-post voting in single-member constituencies. Candidates were not required to be residents of the constituencies in which they ran. Most constituencies were roughly equal in population, although Saigon was only allotted seven seats (6% of the total) despite being home to about 14% of the national population.

== Results ==
Party	Seats
National Revolutionary Movement	61
Citizens' Assembly	25
Revolutionary Labor Party	15
Movement to Win and Preserve Freedom	8
Dai-Viet Progressive Party	1
Pro-government Independents	11
Vacant	2
Total	123
Source: Secretary of State for Information, Republic of Vietnam
