= 1956 Cuban parliamentary election =

Mid-term parliamentary elections were held in Cuba on 1 November 1956 in order to fill half the seats in the Senate and House of Representatives.
