= Senator Joiner =

Senator Joiner may refer to:

- Lemuel W. Joiner (1810–1886), Wisconsin State Senate
- Robert Joiner (1841–1920), Wisconsin State Senate

== See also ==
- Senator Joyner (disambiguation)
