= 1956 South Korean local elections =

Elections were held in South Korea on 8 August 1956 for city, town and township mayors and councilors and on 13 August 1956 for special city and provincial councilors. A total of six city mayors, 30 town mayors, 544 township mayors, 416 city councilors, 990 town councilors, 15,548 township councilors, 47 special city councilors, and 390 provincial councilors were elected.

== City, town and township elections ==
Elections for city, town and township mayors and councilors were held on 8 August 1956.

=== Mayoral elections ===
==== Summary ====
| Party | City | | | Town | | | Township | | |
| Party | Votes | % | Mayors | Votes | % | Mayors | Votes | % | Mayors |
|---|---|---|---|---|---|---|---|---|---|
| Liberal Party | | | 2 | | | 8 | | | 282 |
| Democratic Party | | | 0 | | | 1 | | | 9 |
| National Association | | | 0 | | | 1 | | | 6 |
| Farmers' Association | | | 0 | | | 0 | | | 3 |
| Other parties | | | 0 | | | 0 | | | 1 |
| Independents | | | 4 | | | 20 | | | 243 |
| Invalid/blank votes | | – | – | | – | – | | – | – |
| Total | 181,863 | 100 | 6 | | | 30 | | | 544 |
| Registered voters/turnout | 209,815 | 86.68 | – | | | – | | | – |
Source: Council of Local Authorities for International Relations

==== City mayoral elections by region ====
| Region | Mayors | Liberal | Ind. |
|---|---|---|---|
| Gangwon | 1 | 1 | |
| North Chungcheong | 2 | 1 | 1 |
| North Jeolla | 2 | | 2 |
| South Jeolla | 1 | | 1 |
| Total | 6 | 2 | 4 |

==== Town mayoral elections by region ====
| Region | Mayors | Liberal | Democratic | National Association | Ind. |
|---|---|---|---|---|---|
| Gyeonggi | 4 | | | | 4 |
| Gangwon | 3 | | | | 3 |
| North Chungcheong | 3 | 3 | | | |
| South Chungcheong | 5 | | 1 | | 4 |
| North Jeolla | 2 | 1 | | | 1 |
| South Jeolla | 4 | 2 | | | 2 |
| North Gyeongsang | 5 | 1 | | 1 | 3 |
| South Gyeongsang | 3 | 1 | | | 2 |
| Jeju | 1 | | | | 1 |
| Total | 30 | 8 | 1 | 1 | 20 |

==== Township mayoral elections by region ====
| Region | Mayors | Liberal | Democratic | National Association | Farmers' Association | Others | Ind. |
|---|---|---|---|---|---|---|---|
| Gyeonggi | 106 | 46 | 1 | | 1 | | 58 |
| Gangwon | 59 | 47 | | 1 | | | 11 |
| North Chungcheong | 42 | 42 | | | | | |
| South Chungcheong | 81 | 16 | 2 | | 1 | | 62 |
| North Jeolla | 43 | 30 | 1 | | | | 12 |
| South Jeolla | 42 | 26 | 1 | | | | 15 |
| North Gyeongsang | 98 | 46 | 4 | 2 | | 1 | 45 |
| South Gyeongsang | 68 | 24 | | 3 | 1 | | 40 |
| Jeju | 5 | 5 | | | | | |
| Total | 544 | 282 | 9 | 6 | 3 | 1 | 243 |

=== Council elections ===
| Party | City | | | | Town | | | | Township | | | |
| Party | Votes | % | Seats | +/– | Votes | % | Seats | +/– | Votes | % | Seats | +/– |
|---|---|---|---|---|---|---|---|---|---|---|---|---|
| Liberal Party | | | 157 | +43 | | | 510 | +236 | | | 10,823 | +6,767 |
| Democratic Party | | | 54 | New | | | 57 | New | | | 231 | New |
| National Association | | | 17 | –12 | | | 28 | –127 | | | 161 | –2,276 |
| Farmers' Association | | | 1 | New | | | 3 | New | | | 16 | New |
| Other parties | | | 10 | +1 | | | 1 | –13 | | | 33 | –35 |
| Independents | | | 177 | +5 | | | 391 | –39 | | | 4,284 | –2,583 |
| Invalid/blank votes | | – | – | – | | – | – | – | | – | – | – |
| Total | 891,728 | 100 | 416 | +38 | 649,544 | 100 | 990 | –25 | 5,295,462 | 100 | 15,548 | –503 |
| Registered voters/turnout | 1,111,489 | 80.23 | – | – | 734,538 | 88.43 | – | – | 5,689,917 | 93.07 | – | – |
Source: Council of Local Authorities for International Relations

== Special city and provincial elections ==
Elections for special city and provincial councilors were held on 13 August 1956.

=== Summary ===
| Party | Votes | % | Seats | | | |
| Party | Votes | % | Special city | Province | Total | +/– |
|---|---|---|---|---|---|---|
| Liberal Party | | | 1 | 248 | 249 | +236 |
| Democratic Party | | | 40 | 58 | 98 | New |
| National Association | | | 0 | 6 | 6 | –127 |
| Farmers' Association | | | 1 | 0 | 1 | New |
| Independents | | | 5 | 78 | 83 | –39 |
| Invalid/blank votes | | – | – | – | | – |
| Total | 7,223,605 | 100 | 47 | 390 | 437 | +131 |
| Registered voters/turnout | 8,421,772 | 85.77 | – | – | | – |
Source: Council of Local Authorities for International Relations

=== By region ===
| Region | Seats | Liberal | Democratic | National Association | Farmers' Association | Independent |
|---|---|---|---|---|---|---|
| Seoul | 47 | 1 | 40 | | 1 | 5 |
| Gyeonggi | 45 | 14 | 22 | 1 | | 8 |
| Gangwon | 25 | 23 | 1 | | | 1 |
| North Chungcheong | 30 | 29 | | | | 1 |
| South Chungcheong | 45 | 37 | 6 | | | 2 |
| North Jeolla | 44 | 22 | 6 | | | 16 |
| South Jeolla | 58 | 47 | 10 | | | 1 |
| North Gyeongsang | 61 | 40 | 7 | 1 | | 13 |
| South Gyeongsang | 67 | 21 | 6 | 4 | | 36 |
| Jeju | 15 | 15 | | | | |
| Total | 437 | 249 | 98 | 6 | 1 | 83 |
