= Luther E. Barnhardt =

American politician

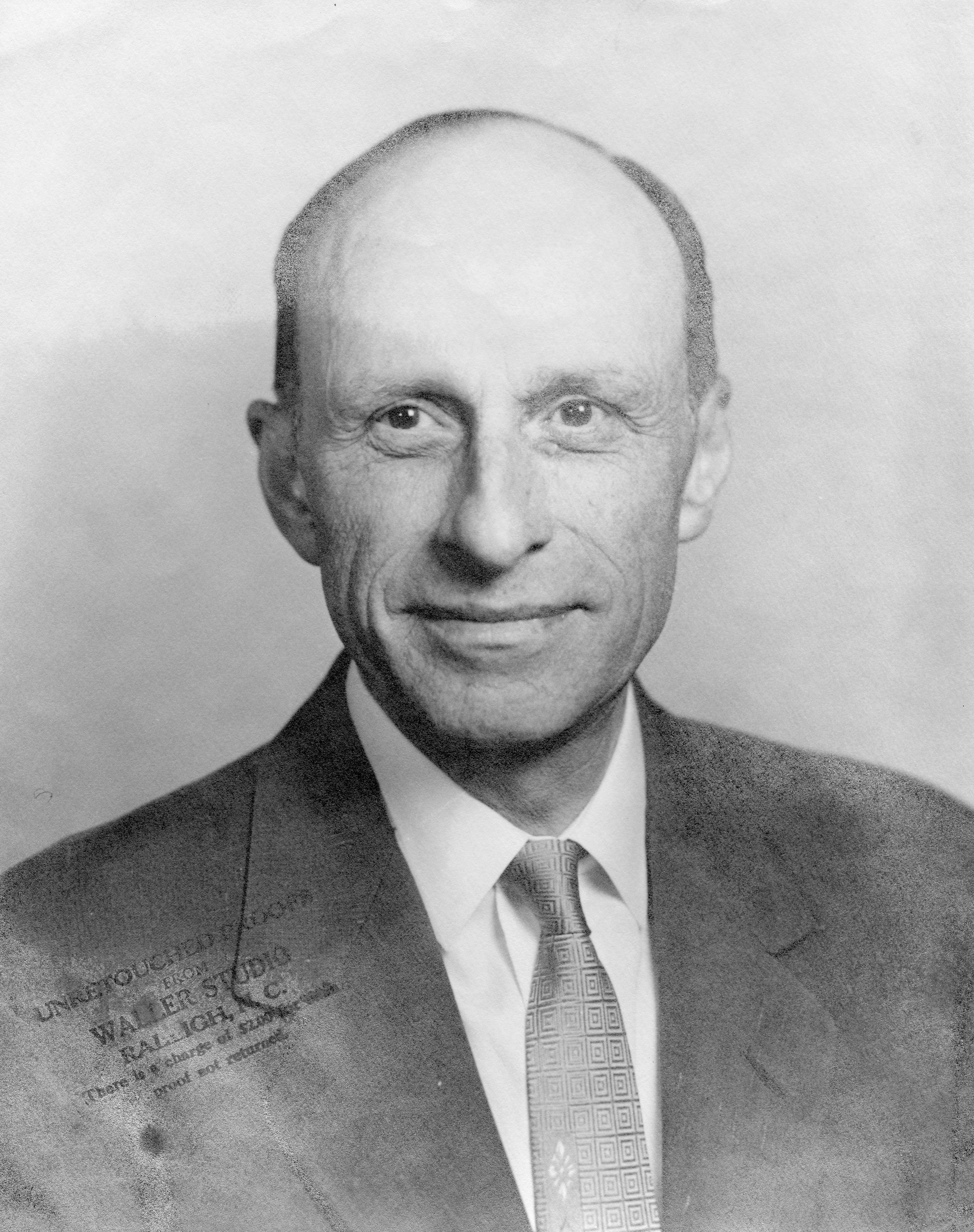

23rd Lieutenant Governor of North Carolina
- In office 1957 – January 5, 1961
- Governor: Luther H. Hodges
- Preceded by: Luther H. Hodges
- Succeeded by: Harvey Cloyd Philpott

Member of the North Carolina Senate from the 21st District
- In office 1945–1956 Serving with Nelson Woodson

Personal details
- Born: November 29, 1903 Concord, North Carolina, U.S.
- Died: June 1, 1980 (aged 76)
- Spouse: Burvelle MacFarland
- Children: 4

Luther Ernest Barnhardt (November 29, 1903 – June 1, 1980) was an American politician in the state of North Carolina. He served as the 23rd lieutenant governor of North Carolina from 1957 to 1961 under Governor Luther H. Hodges.

== Early life ==
Barnhardt was born on November 29, 1903, in Concord, North Carolina. One of five children, his parents were George Thomas and Lily Faggart Barnhardt. He received both his bachelors of laws and juris doctor degrees from Wake Forest University. He was an attorney in Concord for 52 years and chair of the Cabarrus Board of Elections for a decade.

== Political career ==
A Democrat, Barnhardt was a member of the North Carolina Senate for five terms beginning in 1944 as a representative for Cabarrus and Rowan counties. He was elected president of the state senate in 1953, a position he held for three years. When the governor William B. Umstead died and Luther H. Hodges replaced him, Barnhardt was elected lieutenant governor in 1956. After his term expired, he chose not to seek election to any public office. In 1977, Barnhardt retired his law practice.

== Personal life ==
Barnhardt was married to Burvelle MacFarland Barnhardt and the couple had two sons and two daughters. He died on June 1, 1980, at a nursing home in Charlotte, North Carolina. He is buried at Carolina Memorial Park in Concord.

Party political offices
Preceded by Luther H. Hodges	Democratic nominee for Lieutenant Governor of North Carolina; 1956	Succeeded by Harvey Cloyd Philpott
Political offices
Preceded by Luther H. Hodges	Lieutenant Governor of North Carolina; 1957-1961	Succeeded by Harvey Cloyd Philpott
