= C. V. Henkel =

American politician (1908–1971)

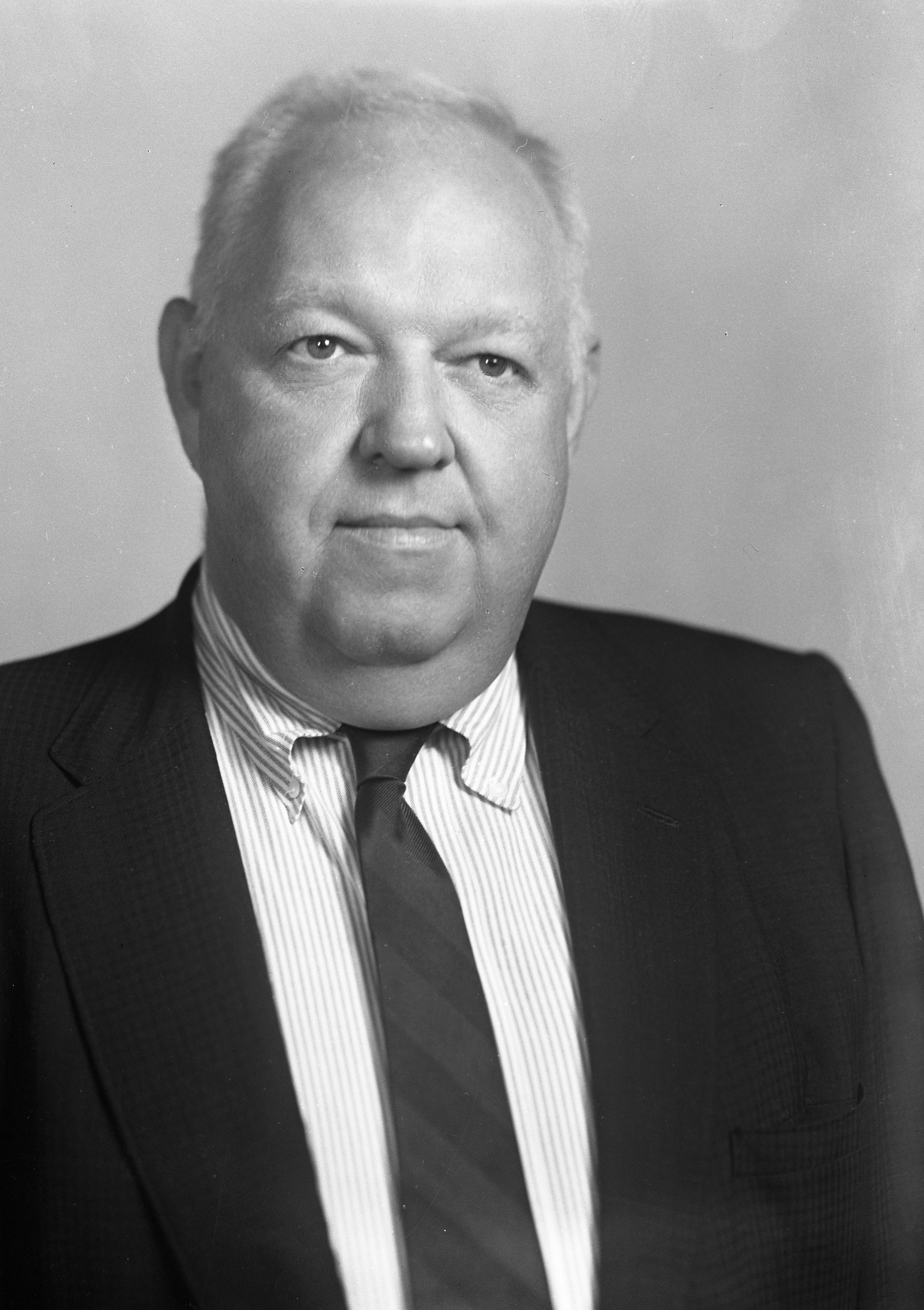
- Official portrait, 1957

Member of the North Carolina Senate
- In office November 8, 1966 – November 5, 1968 Serving with Adrian L. Shuford Jr.
- Preceded by: James V. Johnson
- Succeeded by: Norman Joyner
- Constituency: 26th district
- In office November 4, 1952 – November 8, 1960
- Preceded by: C. H. Dearman
- Succeeded by: James V. Johnson
- Constituency: 25th district

Personal details
- Born: Columbus Vance Henkel Jr. September 16, 1908 Statesville, North Carolina
- Died: April 15, 1971 (aged 62)
- Party: Democratic
- Spouses: Marguerite Nunan (m. 1944; died 1961); Julie Steele (m. 1965)
- Education: University of North Carolina

Columbus Vance Henkel Jr. (September 16, 1908 – April 15, 1971) was a North Carolina politician.

He was born in Statesville, North Carolina, September 16, 1908. He was the son of Columbus Vance Henkel and Lila Dunavant. He served five terms in the North Carolina Senate and ran for Lieutenant Governor of North Carolina in 1960.

== Brown-bagging legislation ==
As chairman of the North Carolina Senate Committee on Propositions and Grievances, Henkel played a central role in the legislature's 1967 response to a North Carolina Supreme Court ruling that had outlawed "brown bagging" — the practice of patrons bringing their own liquor into restaurants and other establishments. Henkel, who had previously owned a hotel in Statesville, warned fellow Piedmont-region legislators at a Piedmont Caucus breakfast meeting that the ruling had "pretty badly disrupted the travel industry in North Carolina," citing particular harm to the Sandhills resort area.

Senate Bill 2, the brown-bagging bill, was introduced on the opening day of the 1967 legislative session. Henkel served on the conference committee, along with Senators John J. Burney Jr. of New Hanover County, Ruffin Bailey of Wake County, Harry Buchanan of Henderson County, and L. P. McLendon Jr. of Guilford County, that produced the final compromise version of the bill. The General Assembly passed the compromise bill on April 21, 1967, legalizing brown bagging in the state's legally wet cities and counties.

On the Senate floor, Senator Burney credited Henkel by name, stating that "the State of North Carolina is deeply indebted to Sen. C. V. Henkel" for his role in the bill's passage, a sentiment Governor Bob Scott said he shared.

After his death in 1971, the North Carolina General Assembly enacted a resolution to "record its appreciation of his life and his contributions to the State of North Carolina."
