= 1956 Malayan local elections =

Local elections were held in the Federation of Malaya in 1956.

== Municipal election ==
=== George Town ===
Date: 1 December 1956; Electorate: Turnout: 41.14%
Wards	Elected councillor	Elected party	Votes	Majority	Opponent(s)	Party	Votes
Labour 5 (5) | Independent 3 (3) | Alliance 1 (7)
Jelutong	1. Cheah Pee Aik	Ind.		682	2. S. M. Zainal Abidin	Alliance (UMNO)	
Kelawei	1. A. Raja Gopal	Ind.	1,112	465	2. S. M. Hussain	Alliance (UMNO)	647
Sungei Pinang	1. 2. 3.						
Tanjong East	1. Khoo Yat See	Ind.					
Tanjong West	1. 2. 3.						

=== Kuala Lumpur ===
Date: 1 December 1956; Electorate: Turnout:
Wards	Elected councillor	Elected party	Votes	Majority	Opponent(s)	Party	Votes
?
Bangsar	1.						
Imbi	1.						
Petaling	1.						
Sentul	1.						

=== Malacca ===
Date: 1 December 1956; Electorate: Turnout:
Wards	Elected councillor	Elected party	Votes	Majority	Opponent(s)	Party	Votes
Alliance 2 (?) | Malayan Party 1 (?)
Bukit China	1. J. L. de Cruz	Malayan Party	1,301	161	2. Cheng Chia Hua; 3. P. K. Nair	Alliance (MCA); Labour	1,140; 35
Fort	1. Tam Seat Wah	Alliance (MCA)			2. Chin Boon Soon	Malayan Party	
Tranquerah	1. Tamby Abdullah	Alliance (UMNO)			2. Hashim Abdul Ghani	Malayan Party	

== Town councils election ==
=== Alor Star ===
Date: Electorate: Turnout:
Wards	Elected councillor	Elected party	Votes	Majority	Opponent(s)	Party	Votes
?
Kampong	1.						
Pekan	1.						
Seberang	1.						

=== Bandar Maharani, Muar ===
Date: 1 December 1956; Electorate: Turnout:
Wards	Elected councillor	Elected party	Votes	Majority	Opponent(s)	Party	Votes
Alliance 2 (?)
Maharani	1. Lim Ah Sitt	Alliance (MCA)	Unopposed				
Parit Stongkat	1. Ho Koon Toh	Alliance (MCA)	Unopposed				
Sultan Ibrahim	1.				Mohd. Noor Sulaiman; Omar Ahmad	Alliance (UMNO); Ind.	

=== Bandar Penggaram, Batu Pahat ===
Date: 1 December 1956; Electorate: Turnout:
Wards	Elected councillor	Elected party	Votes	Majority	Opponent(s)	Party	Votes
?
Gunong Soga	1.						
Jalan Sultanah	1.						
Kampong Petani	1.						

=== Bukit Mertajam ===
Date: Electorate: Turnout:
Wards	Elected councillor	Elected party
?
	1.	
	1.	

=== Butterworth ===
Date: 1 December 1956; Electorate: Turnout:
Wards	Elected councillor	Elected party	Votes	Majority	Opponent(s)	Party	Votes
Alliance 2 (?)
North	1. Goh Chin Cheng	Alliance (MCA)					
South	1. Abdul Majid Hussain	Alliance (UMNO)					

=== Ipoh-Menglembu ===
Date: 1 December 1956; Electorate: Turnout:
Wards	Elected councillor	Elected party	Votes	Majority	Opponent(s)	Party	Votes
Alliance 4 (11) | PPP 0 (1)
Green Town	1. Kok Ho Teik	Alliance (MCA)			2. Toh Seang Eng	Ind.	
Menglembu	1. Chong Hong Chew	Alliance (MCA)	Unopposed				
Pasir Puteh	1. Yusoff Ahmad	Alliance (UMNO)	Unopposed				
Silibin	1. M. Ramanand	Alliance (MIC)			2. S. Nalliah	PPP	

=== Johore Bahru ===
Date: ~~1 December 1956~~; Electorate: Turnout: nil
Wards	Elected councillor	Elected party	Votes	Majority	Opponent(s)	Party	Votes
Alliance 6 (12)
Ayer Molek	1. Wong Sze Ming	Alliance (MCA)	Unopposed				
Nong Chik	1. Che Kalsom Ali	Alliance (UMNO)	Unopposed				
Tampoi	1. Cheong Chee Kwan; 2. Sheikh Abu Bakar Ahmad; 3. Ahmad Yunos	Alliance (MCA); Alliance (UMNO); Alliance (UMNO)	Unopposed				
Tebrau	1. Wong Peng Long	Alliance (MCA)	Unopposed				

=== Kampar ===
Date: 22 December 1956; Electorate: Turnout:
Wards	Elected councillor	Elected party	Votes	Majority	Opponent(s)	Party	Votes
?
Central	1. 2. 3.						
North	1. 2. 3.						
South	1. 2. 3.						

=== Klang ===
Date: Electorate: Turnout:
Wards	Elected councillor	Elected party	Votes	Majority	Opponent(s)	Party	Votes
?
Klang North	1.						
Klang South	1.						
Port Swettenham	1.						

=== Kluang ===
Date: 5 November 1956; Electorate: Turnout:
Wards	Elected councillor	Elected party	Votes	Majority	Opponent(s)	Party	Votes
?
Gunong Lambak	1.				Chow Sek Loon; Teh Wan Boon; Tiah Eng Bee; Woo See Tiam		
Mengkibol	1.						
Mesjid Lama	1.				Lim Chin Khean; Tan Hua Hong		

=== Kota Bharu ===
Date: Electorate: Turnout:
Wards	Elected councillor	Elected party	Votes	Majority	Opponent(s)	Party	Votes
?
Kubang Pasu	1.						
Kota Lama	1.						
Wakaf Pasu	1.						

=== Kuala Kangsar ===
Date: 20 December 1956; Electorate: Turnout:
Wards	Elected councillor	Elected party	Votes	Majority	Opponent(s)	Party	Votes
?
Idris	1. 2. 3.						
Kangsar	1. 2. 3.						
Kenas	1. 2. 3.						

=== Kuala Trengganu ===
Date: 1 December 1956; Electorate: Turnout:
Wards	Elected councillor	Elected party	Votes	Majority	Opponent(s)	Party	Votes
Alliance 3 (?)
Bukit Besar	1. Mansor Mohamed	Alliance (UMNO)	Unopposed				
Kuala	1. Gan Chong Bin	Alliance (MCA)			2. Mohamed Taib Ismail	Ind.	
Ladang	1. Muda Abdullah	Alliance (UMNO)	Unopposed				

=== Kuantan ===
Date: Electorate: Turnout:
Wards	Elected councillor	Elected party	Votes	Majority	Opponent(s)	Party	Votes
?
Central Town	1.						
Tanah Puteh	1.						
Telok Sisek	1.						

=== Pasir Mas ===
Date: Electorate: Turnout:
Wards	Elected councillor	Elected party
?
Lemal	1.	
Kampong Bahru	1.	
Pengkalan Pasir	1.	

=== Raub ===
Date: Electorate: Turnout:
Wards	Elected councillor	Elected party
?
Raub Australian Gold Mine	1.	
Raub Town	1.	
Sempalit	1.	
Tanjong Gadong	1.	

=== Segamat ===
Date: 10 November 1956; Electorate: Turnout:
Wards	Elected councillor	Elected party	Votes	Majority	Opponent(s)	Party	Votes
?
Buloh Kasap	1.						
Gemereh	1.						
Genuang	1.						

=== Seremban ===
Date: 1 December 1956; Electorate: Turnout:
Wards	Elected councillor	Elected party	Votes	Majority	Opponent(s)	Party	Votes
Alliance 1 (7) | Labour 1 (5) | ?
Lake	1.						
Lobak	1. S. Sappathan	Labour	671	71	2. Chong Tin Huat	Alliance (MCA)	600
Rahang	1. Choong Yoon Chong	Alliance (MCA)	529	8	2. Sulaiman Sair Ali Khan	Labour	521
Temiang	1.				Paul Siow; Tham Tat Ming		

=== Sungei Patani ===
Date: Electorate: Turnout:
Wards	Elected councillor	Elected party
?
Pekan Bahru	1.	
Pekan Lama	1.	
Rural	1.	

=== Taiping ===
Date: Electorate: Turnout:
Wards	Elected councillor	Elected party	Votes	Majority	Opponent(s)	Party	Votes
Alliance 4 (9)
Assam Kumbang	1.						
Klian Pau	1. 2.						
Kota	1.						

=== Teluk Anson ===
Date: Electorate: Turnout:
Wards	Elected councillor	Elected party	Votes	Majority	Opponent(s)	Party	Votes
?
Changkat Jong	1.						
Denison Road	1.						
Pasir Bedamar	1.						
