= 1956 United States Senate election in Alabama =

1956 Democratic Senate primary election in Alabama
- May 1, 1956
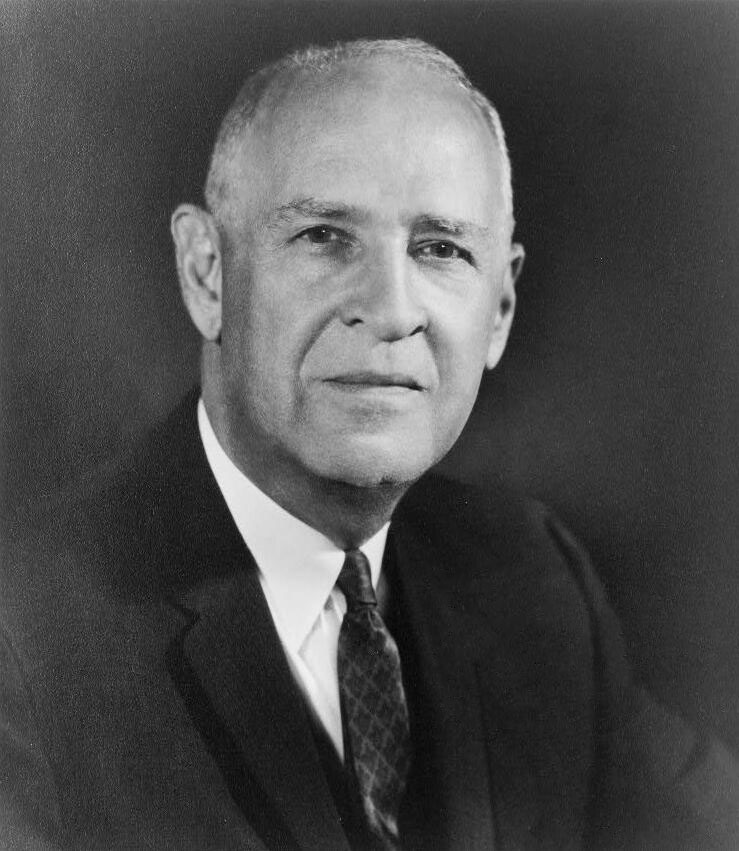

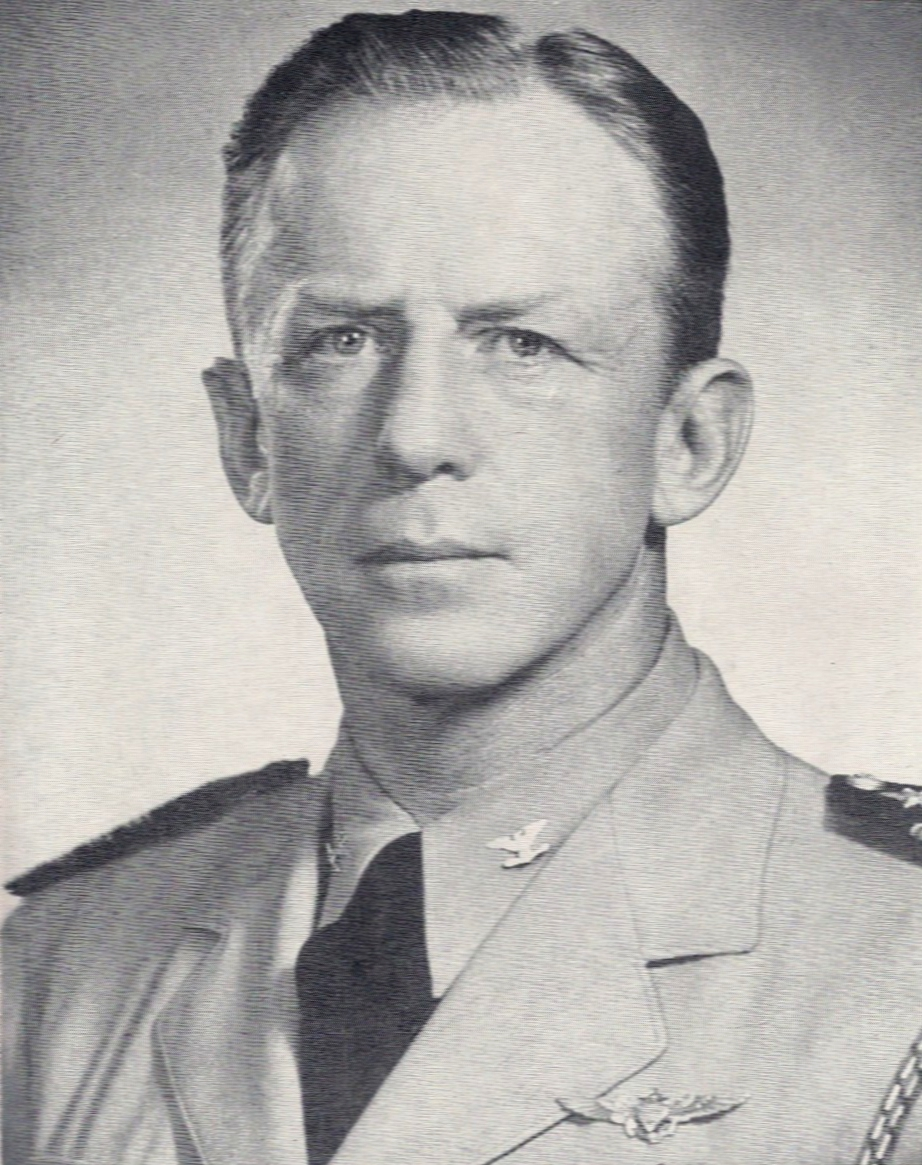
Nominee	J. Lister Hill	John G. Crommelin
Party	Democratic	Democratic
Popular vote	247,519	115,440
Percentage	68.19%	31.81%
- County results Hill: 50–60% 60–70% 70–80% 80–90% >90% Crommelin: 50–60%
U.S. senator before election
J. Lister Hill
Democratic
Elected U.S. Senator
J. Lister Hill
Democratic

The 1956 United States Senate election in Alabama was held on November 6, 1956. Incumbent Senator J. Lister Hill was re-elected for a fourth term in office.

On May 1, Hill won the Democratic primary over John G. Crommelin, who ran in 1950 as an independent, with 68.20% of the vote.

Hill won the November general election without an opponent.

== Democratic primary ==
=== Candidates ===
- J. Lister Hill, incumbent Senator
- John G. Crommelin, retired Rear Admiral in the United States Navy and independent candidate for Senate in 1950

=== Results ===
1956 United States Senate Democratic primary
Party	Candidate	Votes	%
Democratic	J. Lister Hill (incumbent)	247,519	68.19%
Democratic	John G. Crommelin	115,440	31.81%
Total votes		362,959	100.00%

== General election ==
1956 United States Senate election
Party	Candidate	Votes	%	±%
Democratic	J. Lister Hill (incumbent)	330,182	100.00%	▲23.46
Write-in	All others	9	0.00%	N/A
Total votes		330,191	100.00%	
