= Lether Edward Frazar =

American politician (1904–1960)

44th Lieutenant Governor of Louisiana
- In office May 8, 1956 – May 10, 1960
- Governor: Earl K. Long
- Preceded by: C. E. Barham
- Succeeded by: Clarence C. "Taddy" Aycock

Louisiana State Representative for Beauregard Parish
- In office 1936–1940
- Preceded by: Monette Jones
- Succeeded by: Stuart S. Kay

Personal details
- Born: Lether Edward Frazar; December 1, 1904 DeRidder, Louisiana, U.S.
- Died: May 15, 1960 (aged 55)
- Party: Democratic
- Spouse: Lily Hooper Frazar (1904–1994)
- Children: 2
- Occupation: Educator, college president

Lether Edward Frazar (December 1, 1904 – May 15, 1960) was a Louisiana politician who served as the 44th lieutenant governor of Louisiana. Frazar served in the Louisiana House of Representatives. His Ph.D. was from Columbia University. He was president of the University of Louisiana at Lafayette from 1938 to 1941 and of McNeese State University from 1944 to 1955.

== Sources ==
- "Lether Edward Frazar", A Dictionary of Louisiana Biography, Vol. I (1988), p. 319
- Lether E. Frazar Collection
- Earl's Whirl
- University of Louisiana - presidents
- 2002 McNeese Football Banquet
- University of Louisiana
- Broussard Hall
- "Tau Sigma Delta Fraternity". Archived from the original on September 30, 2007.
- McNeese State University Faculty/Staff Handbook
- Listing of all Headstones located in Beauregard Parish
- http://66.218.69.11/search/cache?p=lether+e.+frazar&toggle=1&ei=UTF-8&fr=yfp-t-501&u=www.burkfoster.com/StruckbyLightning.htm&w=lether+e+frazar&d=AaAyv0VuN1tv&icp=1&.intl=us
- Douglass-Pruitt House

Party political offices
Preceded by C. E. Barham	Democratic nominee for Lieutenant Governor of Louisiana; 1956	Succeeded by Taddy Aycock
Political offices
Preceded by C. E. Barham	Lieutenant Governor of Louisiana; 1956–1960	Succeeded by Clarence C. "Taddy" Aycock
Preceded by Monette Jones	Louisiana State Representative for Beauregard Parish; 1936–1940	Succeeded by Stuart S. Kay
Preceded by Dr. Rodney Cline (1941–1944)	President of McNeese State University (previously McNeese State College) in Lake Charles, Louisiana); 1944–1955	Succeeded by Dr. Wayne N. Cusic (1955–1969)
Preceded by Edwin Lewis Stephens	President of the University of Louisiana at Lafayette (previously Southwestern Louisiana Institute); 1938–1941	Succeeded by Joel L. Fletcher
