= 1956 Louisiana gubernatorial election =

1956 Louisiana Democratic gubernatorial primary
- January 17, 1956
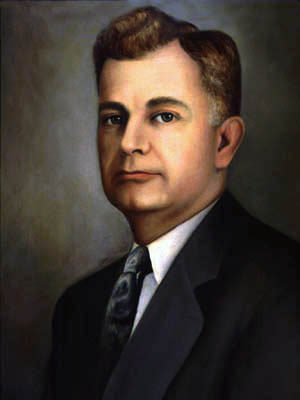

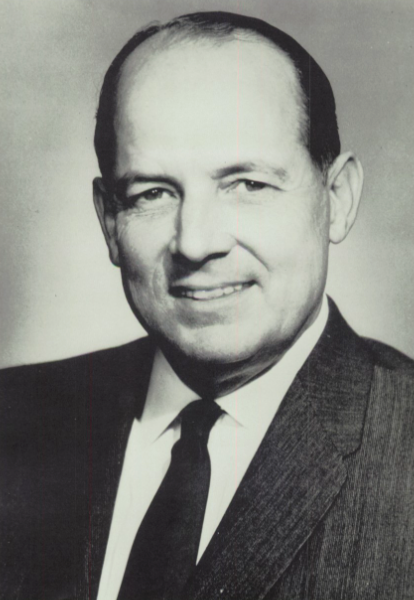

Candidate	Earl Long	Chep Morrison	Fred Preaus
Party	Democratic	Democratic	Democratic
Popular vote	421,681	191,576	95,955
Percentage	51.44%	23.37%	11.71%
Candidate	Francis Grevemberg	James M. McLemore
Party	Democratic	Democratic
Popular vote	62,309	48,188
Percentage	7.60%	5.88%
- Parish results Long: 30–40% 40–50% 50–60% 60–70% 70–80% Morrison: 40–50% Preaus: 60–70%
Governor before election
Robert F. Kennon
Democratic
Elected Governor
Earl Long
Democratic

The 1956 Louisiana gubernatorial election was held on January 17, 1956. Incumbent governor Robert F. Kennon was ineligible to run for a second term in office. Earl K. Long won the Democratic primary, which was tantamount to election, securing his second full term as Governor of Louisiana. He received over 50% of the vote, defeating his opponents so soundly that no runoff vote was needed. His closest competitor was New Orleans mayor deLesseps Story Morrison.

== Background ==
Like most Southern states between the Reconstruction Era and the Civil Rights Movement, Louisiana's Republican Party was virtually nonexistent in terms of electoral support. This meant that the Democratic Party primary held on this date was the real contest over who would be governor.

Outgoing Governor Robert F. Kennon was constitutionally barred from succeeding himself.

== Democratic primary ==
=== Candidates ===
- Francis Grevemberg, State Police Superintendent
- Earl K. Long, former governor (1939–40, 1948–52) of Winnfield
- James M. McLemore, Alexandria cattleman and candidate for governor in 1952
- deLesseps Morrison, Mayor of New Orleans since 1946
- Fred Preaus, former Director of Highways, a car dealer and former member of the Farmerville Town Council

=== Campaign ===
Long's campaign promises included spending increases to fund health, education, and other social programs. He made these promises on an extensive tour of the state, stopping in nearly every town to deliver theatrical speeches mocking his opponents. The acerbic Long attacked Morrison with particular enthusiasm, mocking his toupee and fancy suits and calling him "as slick as a peeled onion", out of touch with residents of small towns and rural areas. Long also mocked his unusual first name: "Ole De la Soups is the only man that can talk out of both sides of his mouth, whistle, and strut all at once." In addition to his usual base, Long also won support from corrupt rural sheriffs who were angry at their loss of gambling revenues after Kennon's reforms and Grevemberg's raids.

New Orleans crime family boss Carlos Marcello surreptitiously gave Long's campaign $250,000.

Despite the reluctance of Morrison's own Crescent City Democratic Association, the New Orleans mayor was overly optimistic at his chances. Morrison had expected the support of Governor Kennon, but did not get it; Morrison had endorsed Kennon's opponent Hale Boggs in the first primary of the 1952 election. Long encouraged false optimism in Morrison's campaign by having his rural supporters write to the New Orleans mayor urging him to run for governor. This false rural support never materialized in the actual election; Morrison was too unfamiliar with the state's rural politics and fought a perception of urban sophistication that did not play well in the country. His emphasis on his record as mayor and his promises of economic development found little resonance with rural voters.

Preaus, running third, had the support of incumbent governor Kennon.

Grevemberg campaigned on his reputation for integrity, but his gambling crackdown had alienated too many people for him to receive much support.

McLemore ran a segregationist campaign as he had in 1952.

=== Results ===
Earl Long won 62 of the state's 64 parishes; only Orleans Parish went to Morrison. The support of local political boss Leander Perez won Plaquemines Parish for Fred Preaus, who lost his own Union Parish. Long was intensely proud of his first-primary victory, exclaiming "Huey never done that!"

1956 Democratic gubernatorial primary
Party	Candidate	Votes	%
Democratic	Earl Long	421,681	51.44%
Democratic	deLesseps Morrison	191,576	23.37%
Democratic	Fred Preaus	95,955	11.71%
Democratic	Francis Grevemberg	62,309	7.60%
Democratic	James M. McLemore	48,188	5.88%
Total votes		819,709	5.88%
