= 1988 United States presidential election in North Carolina =

- November 8, 1988
- Turnout: 62.19% ▼6.26 pp

Nominee	George H. W. Bush	Michael Dukakis
Party	Republican	Democratic
Home state	Texas	Massachusetts
Running mate	Dan Quayle	Lloyd Bentsen
Electoral vote	13	0
Popular vote	1,237,258	890,167
Percentage	57.97%	41.71%

Bush
50–60%
60–70%
70–80%
Dukakis
40–50%
50–60%
60–70%
President before election
Ronald Reagan
Republican
Elected President
George H. W. Bush
Republican

The 1988 United States presidential election in North Carolina took place on November 8, 1988, and was part of the 1988 United States presidential election. Voters chose 13 representatives, or electors to the Electoral College, who voted for president and vice president.

North Carolina voted for the Vice President George H. W. Bush, running with U.S Senator Dan Quayle, against Governor Michael Dukakis, running with U.S. Senator Lloyd Bentsen.

== Background ==
With the exception of Jimmy Carter's victory in North Carolina in 1976, the state had voted for the Republican presidential nominee in every election since 1968. Republican membership in the United States House of Representatives from North Carolina peaked in elections held concurrently with the presidential elections and shrank in the following midterms. Jesse Helms's victory in the 1972 senatorial election made him the state's first Republican senator in the 20th century and John Porter East was elected to the state's other seat in 1980, but lost in the 1986 election. Republican identification among voters in the state rose from 27% to 37% between 1968 and 1986 while identification among Democrats fell from 68% to 58%.

== Campaign ==
=== Primaries ===
Al Gore won 51% of the white vote while Dukakis won 30%. The racial composition of the Democratic primary was 71% white and 29% black, and 36% of white voters participated in the Republican primary.

=== General ===
North Carolina was one of the southern states that Michael Dukakis's campaign viewed as winnable. The North Carolina Democratic Party used $500,000 from the national party to hire over 100 workers and organize phone banks in every county, which contacted over 200,000 households. The North Carolina Republican Party received $700,000 from the national party, but only hired ten workers and instead used the money to conduct polling and hire mailing organizations.

George H. W. Bush campaigned in the state three times, and Dan Quayle, Dukakis, and Lloyd Bentsen each came twice. Among white voters, 68% supported Bush while 32% supported Dukakis.

== Results ==
1988 United States presidential election in North Carolina
Party	Candidate	Votes	Percentage	Electoral votes
Republican	George H. W. Bush	1,237,258	57.97%	13
Democratic	Michael Dukakis	890,167	41.71%	0
New Alliance	Lenora Fulani	5,682	0.27%	0
Write-in	Ron Paul	1,263	0.06%	0
Invalid or blank votes				—
Totals		2,134,370	100.00%	13
Voter turnout				—

=== Results by county ===
County	George H.W. Bush Republican		Michael Dukakis Democratic		Lenora Fulani New Alliance		Ron Paul Write-in		Margin		Total
County	#	%	#	%	#	%	#	%	#	%	Total
Alamance	24,131	65.48%	12,642	34.31%	69	0.19%	9	0.02%	11,489	31.17%	36,851
Alexander	7,968	65.56%	4,148	34.13%	33	0.27%	5	0.04%	3,820	31.43%	12,154
Alleghany	2,174	50.98%	2,087	48.94%	3	0.07%	0	0.00%	87	2.04%	4,264
Anson	2,782	36.45%	4,831	63.29%	20	0.26%	0	0.00%	-2,049	-26.84%	7,633
Ashe	6,019	59.69%	4,034	40.01%	17	0.17%	13	0.13%	1,985	19.68%	10,083
Avery	4,277	75.33%	1,367	24.08%	22	0.39%	12	0.21%	2,910	51.25%	5,678
Beaufort	8,190	60.35%	5,352	39.44%	28	0.21%	0	0.00%	2,838	20.91%	13,570
Bertie	2,145	36.24%	3,762	63.56%	12	0.20%	0	0.00%	-1,617	-27.32%	5,919
Bladen	3,770	42.77%	5,031	57.08%	13	0.15%	0	0.00%	-1,261	-14.31%	8,814
Brunswick	10,007	55.78%	7,881	43.93%	32	0.18%	19	0.11%	2,126	11.85%	17,938
Buncombe	36,828	57.55%	26,964	42.14%	185	0.29%	15	0.02%	9,864	15.41%	63,992
Burke	15,933	59.41%	10,848	40.45%	26	0.10%	12	0.04%	5,085	18.96%	26,819
Cabarrus	22,524	67.75%	10,686	32.14%	26	0.08%	12	0.04%	11,838	35.61%	33,248
Caldwell	15,176	65.78%	7,862	34.08%	33	0.14%	0	0.00%	7,314	31.70%	23,071
Camden	1,144	50.87%	1,081	48.07%	24	1.07%	0	0.00%	63	2.80%	2,249
Carteret	11,076	61.55%	6,859	38.12%	51	0.28%	8	0.04%	4,217	23.43%	17,994
Caswell	3,299	43.93%	4,189	55.79%	20	0.27%	1	0.01%	-890	-11.86%	7,509
Catawba	28,872	69.01%	12,922	30.89%	44	0.11%	0	0.00%	15,950	38.12%	41,838
Chatham	6,999	47.81%	7,600	51.92%	27	0.18%	13	0.09%	-601	-4.11%	14,639
Cherokee	4,557	63.78%	2,567	35.93%	21	0.29%	0	0.00%	1,990	27.85%	7,145
Chowan	1,884	51.56%	1,756	48.06%	14	0.38%	0	0.00%	128	3.50%	3,654
Clay	2,174	62.47%	1,289	37.04%	13	0.37%	4	0.11%	885	25.43%	3,480
Cleveland	14,039	57.54%	10,321	42.30%	28	0.11%	9	0.04%	3,718	15.24%	24,397
Columbus	6,659	41.93%	9,172	57.75%	51	0.32%	0	0.00%	-2,513	-15.82%	15,882
Craven	12,057	62.10%	7,313	37.66%	46	0.24%	1	0.01%	4,744	24.44%	19,417
Cumberland	27,057	53.07%	23,789	46.66%	121	0.24%	12	0.02%	3,268	6.41%	50,979
Currituck	2,443	60.98%	1,555	38.82%	5	0.12%	3	0.07%	888	22.16%	4,006
Dare	5,234	64.85%	2,806	34.77%	29	0.36%	2	0.02%	2,428	30.08%	8,071
Davidson	28,374	68.11%	13,215	31.72%	70	0.17%	3	0.01%	15,159	36.39%	41,662
Davie	7,988	71.37%	3,166	28.29%	38	0.34%	0	0.00%	4,822	43.08%	11,192
Duplin	5,774	49.24%	5,945	50.70%	7	0.06%	0	0.00%	-171	-1.46%	11,726
Durham	29,928	45.43%	35,441	53.79%	478	0.73%	36	0.05%	-5,513	-8.36%	65,883
Edgecombe	6,831	42.92%	9,044	56.82%	31	0.19%	10	0.06%	-2,213	-13.90%	15,916
Forsyth	57,688	59.02%	39,726	40.65%	302	0.31%	19	0.02%	17,962	18.37%	97,735
Franklin	5,499	50.17%	5,438	49.62%	22	0.20%	1	0.01%	61	0.55%	10,960
Gaston	34,775	70.32%	14,582	29.49%	87	0.18%	7	0.01%	20,193	40.83%	49,451
Gates	1,451	41.64%	2,024	58.08%	10	0.29%	0	0.00%	-573	-16.44%	3,485
Graham	2,091	61.16%	1,313	38.40%	15	0.44%	0	0.00%	778	22.76%	3,419
Granville	4,880	46.75%	5,280	50.58%	274	2.62%	5	0.05%	-400	-3.83%	10,439
Greene	2,498	47.69%	2,729	52.10%	11	0.21%	0	0.00%	-231	-4.41%	5,238
Guilford	66,060	56.35%	50,351	42.95%	276	0.24%	545	0.46%	15,709	13.40%	117,232
Halifax	7,462	46.03%	8,726	53.83%	23	0.14%	0	0.00%	-1,264	-7.80%	16,211
Harnett	9,749	57.25%	7,259	42.63%	21	0.12%	0	0.00%	2,490	14.62%	17,029
Haywood	8,957	49.68%	9,010	49.98%	48	0.27%	13	0.07%	-53	-0.30%	18,028
Henderson	19,711	67.68%	9,338	32.06%	58	0.20%	18	0.06%	10,373	35.62%	29,125
Hertford	2,977	37.54%	4,943	62.33%	9	0.11%	1	0.01%	-1,966	-24.79%	7,930
Hoke	2,020	37.88%	3,281	61.52%	32	0.60%	0	0.00%	-1,261	-23.64%	5,333
Hyde	940	41.52%	1,316	58.13%	8	0.35%	0	0.00%	-376	-16.61%	2,264
Iredell	21,536	67.02%	10,530	32.77%	62	0.19%	7	0.02%	11,006	34.25%	32,135
Jackson	5,166	51.03%	4,933	48.73%	24	0.24%	0	0.00%	233	2.30%	10,123
Johnston	15,563	63.97%	8,717	35.83%	35	0.14%	14	0.06%	6,846	28.14%	24,329
Jones	1,649	45.78%	1,946	54.03%	7	0.19%	0	0.00%	-297	-8.25%	3,602
Lee	7,104	62.47%	4,231	37.21%	34	0.30%	2	0.02%	2,873	25.26%	11,371
Lenoir	10,669	58.13%	7,649	41.68%	34	0.19%	1	0.01%	3,020	16.45%	18,353
Lincoln	11,651	64.26%	6,444	35.54%	32	0.18%	3	0.02%	5,207	28.72%	18,130
Macon	6,026	61.39%	3,773	38.44%	13	0.13%	4	0.04%	2,253	22.95%	9,816
Madison	3,453	53.07%	3,033	46.62%	20	0.31%	0	0.00%	420	6.45%	6,506
Martin	3,149	46.61%	3,598	53.26%	7	0.10%	2	0.03%	-449	-6.65%	6,756
McDowell	6,526	59.34%	4,449	40.46%	22	0.20%	0	0.00%	2,077	18.88%	10,997
Mecklenburg	106,236	59.42%	71,907	40.22%	619	0.35%	34	0.02%	34,329	19.20%	178,796
Mitchell	4,620	76.82%	1,377	22.90%	17	0.28%	0	0.00%	3,243	53.92%	6,014
Montgomery	4,504	52.80%	3,995	46.83%	31	0.36%	0	0.00%	509	5.97%	8,530
Moore	14,543	65.37%	7,642	34.35%	27	0.12%	36	0.16%	6,901	31.02%	22,248
Nash	15,906	64.34%	8,740	35.35%	32	0.13%	44	0.18%	7,166	28.99%	24,722
New Hanover	23,807	60.56%	15,401	39.18%	82	0.21%	23	0.06%	8,406	21.38%	39,313
Northampton	2,415	34.34%	4,599	65.39%	19	0.27%	0	0.00%	-2,184	-31.05%	7,033
Onslow	12,253	62.87%	7,162	36.75%	71	0.36%	2	0.01%	5,091	26.12%	19,488
Orange	14,503	39.13%	22,326	60.23%	131	0.35%	107	0.29%	-7,823	-21.10%	37,067
Pamlico	2,297	50.98%	2,188	48.56%	21	0.47%	0	0.00%	109	2.42%	4,506
Pasquotank	4,006	50.76%	3,860	48.91%	25	0.32%	1	0.01%	146	1.85%	7,892
Pender	4,926	52.84%	4,377	46.95%	13	0.14%	7	0.08%	549	5.89%	9,323
Perquimans	1,781	53.32%	1,543	46.20%	14	0.42%	2	0.06%	238	7.12%	3,340
Person	4,832	56.00%	3,777	43.78%	17	0.20%	2	0.02%	1,055	12.22%	8,628
Pitt	18,245	55.08%	14,777	44.61%	72	0.22%	33	0.10%	3,468	10.47%	33,127
Polk	3,874	60.31%	2,534	39.45%	13	0.20%	2	0.03%	1,340	20.86%	6,423
Randolph	23,881	73.32%	8,641	26.53%	49	0.15%	0	0.00%	15,240	46.79%	32,571
Richmond	5,073	41.39%	7,151	58.34%	26	0.21%	7	0.06%	-2,078	-16.95%	12,257
Robeson	9,908	36.70%	16,988	62.92%	104	0.39%	0	0.00%	-7,080	-26.22%	27,000
Rockingham	14,591	55.77%	11,551	44.15%	21	0.08%	1	0.00%	3,040	11.62%	26,164
Rowan	23,192	65.48%	12,127	34.24%	96	0.27%	1	0.00%	11,065	31.24%	35,416
Rutherford	10,337	59.73%	6,926	40.02%	43	0.25%	0	0.00%	3,411	19.71%	17,306
Sampson	8,524	51.49%	8,009	48.38%	22	0.13%	0	0.00%	515	3.11%	16,555
Scotland	3,199	45.16%	3,865	54.56%	20	0.28%	0	0.00%	-666	-9.40%	7,084
Stanly	11,885	64.13%	6,627	35.76%	17	0.09%	3	0.02%	5,258	28.37%	18,532
Stokes	8,661	61.81%	5,319	37.96%	27	0.19%	5	0.04%	3,342	23.85%	14,012
Surry	11,393	61.06%	7,245	38.83%	22	0.12%	0	0.00%	4,148	22.23%	18,660
Swain	1,795	49.52%	1,821	50.23%	9	0.25%	0	0.00%	-26	-0.71%	3,625
Transylvania	7,009	61.86%	4,280	37.78%	19	0.17%	22	0.19%	2,729	24.08%	11,330
Tyrrell	637	44.70%	785	55.09%	3	0.21%	0	0.00%	-148	-10.39%	1,425
Union	17,015	65.71%	8,820	34.06%	46	0.18%	15	0.06%	8,195	31.65%	25,896
Vance	5,625	49.88%	5,631	49.94%	18	0.16%	2	0.02%	-6	-0.06%	11,276
Wake	81,613	56.87%	61,352	42.75%	482	0.34%	57	0.04%	20,261	14.12%	143,504
Warren	2,163	33.64%	4,249	66.09%	17	0.26%	0	0.00%	-2,086	-32.45%	6,429
Washington	2,186	43.69%	2,806	56.08%	11	0.22%	1	0.02%	-620	-12.39%	5,004
Watauga	8,662	58.59%	6,048	40.91%	57	0.39%	18	0.12%	2,614	17.68%	14,785
Wayne	15,292	62.48%	9,135	37.33%	47	0.19%	0	0.00%	6,157	25.15%	24,474
Wilkes	15,231	67.65%	7,230	32.11%	53	0.24%	0	0.00%	8,001	35.54%	22,514
Wilson	10,997	57.11%	8,214	42.65%	40	0.21%	6	0.03%	2,783	14.46%	19,257
Yadkin	7,918	71.10%	3,195	28.69%	24	0.22%	0	0.00%	4,723	42.41%	11,137
Yancey	4,160	52.00%	3,803	47.54%	37	0.46%	0	0.00%	357	4.46%	8,000
Totals	1,237,258	57.97%	890,167	41.71%	5,682	0.27%	1,263	0.06%	347,091	16.26%	2,134,370

=== Results by congressional district ===
Bush carried 10 of the 11 congressional districts, including seven held by Democrats.

District	Bush	Dukakis
1st	53.9%	46.1%
2nd	49.7%	50.3%
3rd	57.7%	42.3%
4th	55.7%	44.3%
5th	60.3%	39.7%
6th	60.9%	39.1%
7th	51.4%	48.3%
8th	61.9%	38.1%
9th	61.2%	38.8%
10th	65.5%	35.5%
11th	59.4%	40.6%

== Analysis ==
=== Voter demographics ===
The 1988 presidential vote by demographic subgroup
Demographic subgroup	Dukakis	Bush	% of total vote
Total vote	42	58	100
Party
Republican		94	
Independent		70	
Democratic		18	
Ideology
Liberals		27	
Moderates		49	
Conservatives		83	
Gender
Men		63	
Women		53	
Race
White		68	
Black		8	
Occupation
Blue collar		60	
White collar		63	
Professional		61	
Education
Less than high school graduate		51	
High school graduate		64	
College		60	
Graduate/professional work		52	
Age
18–24 years old		65	
25–49 years old		59	
50–64 years old		56	
65 and older		52	
Family income
Under $20,000		42	
$20,000–50,000		61	
Over $50,000		68	
Religion
Protestant		65	
Catholic		48	

Source: NBC exit poll (2,516 surveyed) and CBS News exit poll (1,503 surveyed)

== Works cited ==
- Black, Earl; Black, Merle (1992). The Vital South: How Presidents Are Elected. Harvard University Press. ISBN 0674941306.
- Moreland, Laurence; Steed, Robert; Baker, Tod, eds. (1991). The 1988 Presidential Election in the South: Continuity Amidst Change in Southern Party Politics. Praeger Publishers. ISBN 0275931455.
