= 1974 United States Senate election in North Carolina =

- November 5, 1974
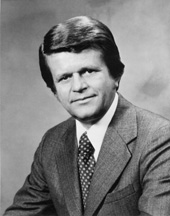

Nominee	Robert B. Morgan	William E. Stevens
Party	Democratic	Republican
Popular vote	633,647	386,720
Percentage	61.56%	37.57%
- County results Morgan: 50–60% 60–70% 70–80% 80–90% >90% Stevens: 50–60% 60–70%
U.S. senator before election
Sam Ervin
Democratic
Elected U.S. Senator
Robert B. Morgan
Democratic

The 1974 North Carolina United States Senate election was held in North Carolina on November 5, 1974, to elect a member of the United States Senate to represent the state of North Carolina. Incumbent Democratic U.S. Senator Sam Ervin declined to run for reelection to a fourth term in office.

Incumbent Democratic Attorney General Robert B. Morgan defeated Republican William E. Stevens by a 24-point margin.

== Democratic primary ==
=== Candidates ===
==== Nominee ====
- Robert B. Morgan, attorney general of North Carolina (1969–1974)

==== Eliminated in primary ====
- Nick Galifianakis, U.S. representative for North Carolina's 4th congressional district (1969–1973) and nominee for U.S. Senate in 1972
- James Johnson
- Henry Wilson

==== Declined ====
- Sam Ervin, incumbent U.S. senator

15.9% of the voting age population participated in the Democratic primary.

=== Results ===
Democratic primary results
Party	Candidate	Votes	%
Democratic	Robert B. Morgan	294,986	50.40%
Democratic	Nick Galifianakis	189,815	32.43%
Democratic	Henry Wilson	67,247	11.49%
Democratic	James Johnson	6,138	1.05%
Democratic	Others	27,140	4.64%
Total votes		585,326	100.00%

== Republican primary ==
=== Candidates ===
==== Nominee ====
- William E. Stevens, furniture company executive

==== Eliminated in primary ====
- B. E. Sweatt
- Wood Hall Young

2.6% of the voting age population participated in the Republican primary.

=== Results ===
Republican primary results
Party	Candidate	Votes	%
Republican	William E. Stevens	62,419	65.12%
Republican	Wood Hall Young	26,918	28.08%
Republican	B. E. Sweatt	6,520	6.80%
Total votes		95,857	100.00%

== General election ==
=== Results ===
1974 North Carolina U.S. Senate election
Party	Candidate	Votes	%	±%
Democratic	Robert B. Morgan	633,647	61.56%	▲1.00
Republican	William Stevens	386,720	37.57%	▼1.87
Other		8,974	0.87%	N/A
Total votes		1,029,341	100.00%	N/A
Democratic hold				

== See also ==
- United States Senate elections, 1974 and 1975

== Works cited ==
- Steed, Robert; Moreland, Laurence; Baker, Tod, eds. (1980). Party Politics in the South. Praeger Publishers. ISBN 0030565863.
