= Galifianakis (surname) =

Galifianakis (Greek: Γαλιφιανάκης) is a Greek surname of a family originating in the Heraklion (Ηράκλειο) region of Crete, Greece. Notable people with the name include:

- Nick Galifianakis (politician) (1928–2023), American politician and Democratic U.S. Congressman from North Carolina between 1967 and 1973, uncle of Zach
- Nick Galifianakis (cartoonist) (born 1962), American cartoonist and artist who draws satirical cartoons, first cousin of Zach
- Zach Galifianakis (born 1969), American actor, comedian and writer
