= Nick Galifianakis (politician) =

American politician (1928–2023)

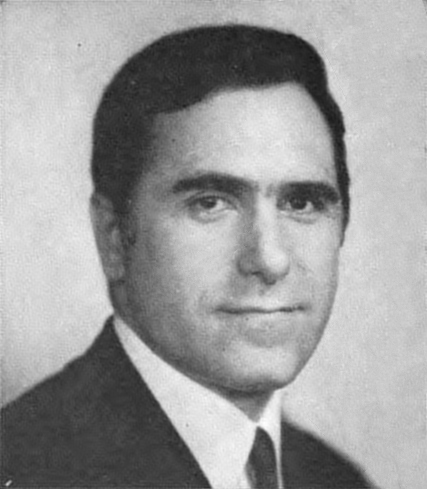

Member of the U.S. House of Representatives from North Carolina
- In office January 3, 1967 – January 3, 1973
- Preceded by: Ralph James Scott
- Succeeded by: Ike Franklin Andrews
- Constituency: 5th district (1967–1969); 4th district (1969–1973)

Member of the North Carolina House of Representatives from Durham County
- In office February 8, 1961 – February 8, 1967
- Preceded by: Multi-member district
- Succeeded by: Multi-member district

Personal details
- Born: July 22, 1928 Durham, North Carolina, U.S.
- Died: March 27, 2023 (aged 94) Raleigh, North Carolina, U.S.
- Party: Democratic
- Spouse: Mary Louise Cheatham (m. 1963)
- Children: 2
- Relatives: Zach Galifianakis (nephew); Nick Galifianakis (nephew)
- Education: Duke University (BA, LLB)
- Profession: Attorney; college professor

Military service
- Branch/service: United States Marine Corps Reserve
- Years of service: 1956–1976
- Rank: Major

Nick Galifianakis (/ˌɡælɪfəˈnækɪs/; July 22, 1928 – March 27, 2023) was an American politician, military veteran, and lawyer from North Carolina. A member of the Democratic Party, he served as a member of the North Carolina House of Representatives of Durham County, North Carolina from 1961 to 1967. He then served three terms as a member of the United States House of Representatives from 1967 to 1973.

== Early life ==
Galifianakis was born in Durham, North Carolina, the son of Greek immigrants Emmanuel "Mike" Galifianakis and the former Sophia Kastrinakis. He attended local public schools and then Duke University, earning a bachelor's degree in 1951 and a law degree in 1953.

After serving in the United States Marine Corps from October 1953 to April 1956, Galifianakis entered the Marine Corps Reserves, retiring as a major. He was admitted to the bar and practiced law in Durham. In 1960, he became an assistant professor of business law at Duke.

== Career ==
=== State legislature ===
In 1966, he was elected to the first of three consecutive terms in the North Carolina House of Representatives. During his service in the state legislature, he was a leader in North Carolina’s modernization of the state’s judicial system.

=== U.S. Congress ===
In 1966, Galifianakis was elected to represent North Carolina's 5th congressional district in the United States Congress. After the state was forced to conduct a mid-decade redistricting for the 1968 elections, he was placed in North Carolina's 4th congressional district, a much more compact district stretching from Durham through Chatham County, North Carolina to Raleigh, North Carolina. He was reelected to the U.S. House of Representatives in 1968 and 1970. Galifianakis voted against the Civil Rights Act of 1968, but was a supporter of the Equal Rights Amendment and opposed the Vietnam War.

Rather than seek a fourth term in the House, Galifianakis instead sought the Democratic nomination for the United States Senate seat held by B. Everett Jordan in the 1972 election, defeating him in the primary. While Galifianakis led his Republican challenger, former television commentator Jesse Helms, by a substantial margin for most of the campaign, Helms closed the gap by tying Galifianakis to his party's presidential nominee George McGovern and with the late-campaign slogan "Jesse Helms: He's One of Us," which some perceived as a reference to Galifianakis's Greek heritage. Galifianakis knew that McGovern was unpopular in his state and tried to distance himself from him. His prospects were also damaged when several conservative Democrats defected to Helms. Helms defeated Galifianakis by eight points in the general election.

Galifianakis sought the Democratic nomination for the U.S. Senate in 1974. He lost in the primary election, 50–32%, to Robert Burren Morgan, the state's attorney general.

=== Later career ===
After leaving politics, Galifianakis returned to his law practice in Durham and retired in his mid-80s.

== Personal life and death ==
Galifianakis and his wife, the former Mary Louise Cheatham, married on April 5, 1963 in Durham, North Carolina, and had one son, Jon Mark Galifianakis and one daughter, Katherine Brackney. He died in his sleep on March 27, 2023 at age 94 in Raleigh, North Carolina, following several years of suffering from Parkinson's disease.

His nephew Nick Galifianakis is a cartoonist and his other nephew Zach Galifianakis is an actor and comedian.

He was interred at Woodlawn Memorial Park in Durham, North Carolina.

== See also ==
U.S. House of Representatives
Preceded by Ralph James Scott	Member of the U.S. House of Representatives from North Carolina's 5th congressional district January 3, 1967 – January 3, 1969	Succeeded by Wilmer Mizell
Preceded by Jim Gardner	Member of the U.S. House of Representatives from North Carolina's 4th congressional district January 3, 1969 – January 3, 1973	Succeeded by Ike Franklin Andrews
Party political offices
Preceded by B. Everett Jordan	Democratic Party nominee for United States Senator from North Carolina (Class 2); 1972	Succeeded by John Ingram
