= Carolyn Hax =

American journalist

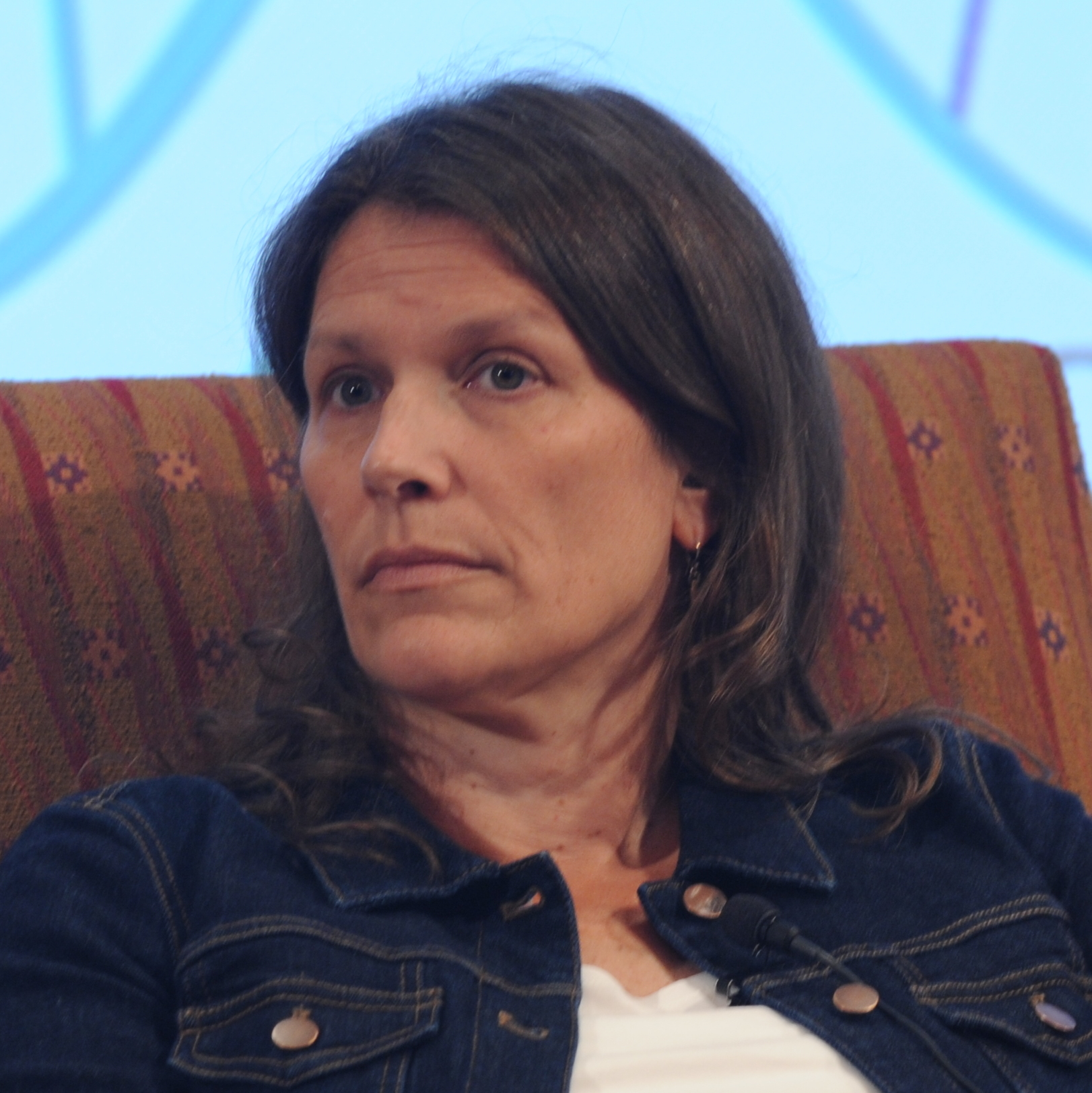
- Hax in a program at the NHGRI in 2014
- Born: Carolyn Hanley Hax; December 5, 1966 (age 59); Bridgeport, Connecticut, U.S.
- Occupations: Author, columnist
- Spouses: Nick Galifianakis (m. 1994; div. 2002); Ken Ackerman (m. 2002)
- Children: 3
- Writing career
- Period: 1997–present
- Genre: Advice

Carolyn Hanley Hax (born December 5, 1966) is an American writer and columnist for The Washington Post and author of the daily syndicated advice column, Carolyn Hax (formerly titled Tell Me About It), which features broad relational advice. Originally targeting readers under 30, the column came to address a broader audience. Each column features a cartoon by her now ex-husband, Nick Galifianakis.

== Early life and education ==
Carolyn Hanley Hax was born December 5, 1966, in Bridgeport, Connecticut. She grew up in Trumbull, the youngest of four daughters. Her father, John H. Hax, was director of research planning at Sikorsky Aircraft in Stratford. Her mother was Elizabeth O'Connell Hax (1940-2002). Carolyn Hax graduated from Hopkins School in 1984 and earned a Bachelor of Arts degree from Harvard University in History and Literature in 1988.

== Career ==
Hax majored in history and literature in college with the goal of becoming a lawyer, but after working as a paralegal, she decided that her skills translated into becoming an editor, and she landed a job with Army Times, the media outlet for the armed forces. where she was associate editor and news editor. After a two-year stint at Army Times, she landed at The Washington Post's Style section.

In 1997, at the age of 30, Hax began writing an advice column for The Washington Post titled Tell Me About It, whose audience aged along with Hax. Hax said she fell into column writing almost accidentally: While casually talking to her superior about an advice columnist whom neither of them liked, Hax blurted out, "What you really need is a snotty 30-year-old writing the column." The column, later renamed Carolyn Hax, is published daily and syndicated by The Washington Post to 118 newspapers around the US, including The Sacramento Bee, Detroit Free Press, and The Dallas Morning News. It features single-panel cartoons by Hax's ex-husband, Nick Galifianakis. Tell Me About It originally provided advice targeted at readers under 30, but has since evolved to have a broadened message and audience.

In 2001, Hax published her first book, Tell Me About It: Lying, Sulking, and Getting Fat and 56 Other Things Not to Do While Looking for Love.

Hax's essay "Peace and Carrots" was included in the 2006 anthology Mommy Wars: Stay-at-Home and Career Moms Face Off on Their Choices, Their Lives, Their Families.

Hax also hosts a weekly Friday web chat, Carolyn Hax Live, at The Washington Post's website.

== Personal life ==
Hax married her first husband, cartoonist Nick Galifianakis, in 1994. Hax divorced Galifianakis in June 2002. At the time of her divorce, she was pregnant with twins by the man who would become her second husband, and she had been separated from Galifianakis at the time she got pregnant. Despite this, some of her readers were critical. Hax and Galifianakis continued to collaborate on the advice column (with him continuing to provide the cartoon), despite the divorce. Galifianakis has publicly commented on their eight-year relationship as well, saying, "We were a great couple that could maybe be greater apart. The point of the column is not to keep people together; it's for people to be happy. And sometimes being happy means making that kind of adjustment, where maybe you're not together."

Hax married her second husband, a childhood friend, Ken Ackerman, in November 2002, and they are parents of twin boys and another son. Hax and Ackerman reside in Massachusetts.
