= 1962 United States Senate election in North Carolina =

- November 6, 1962
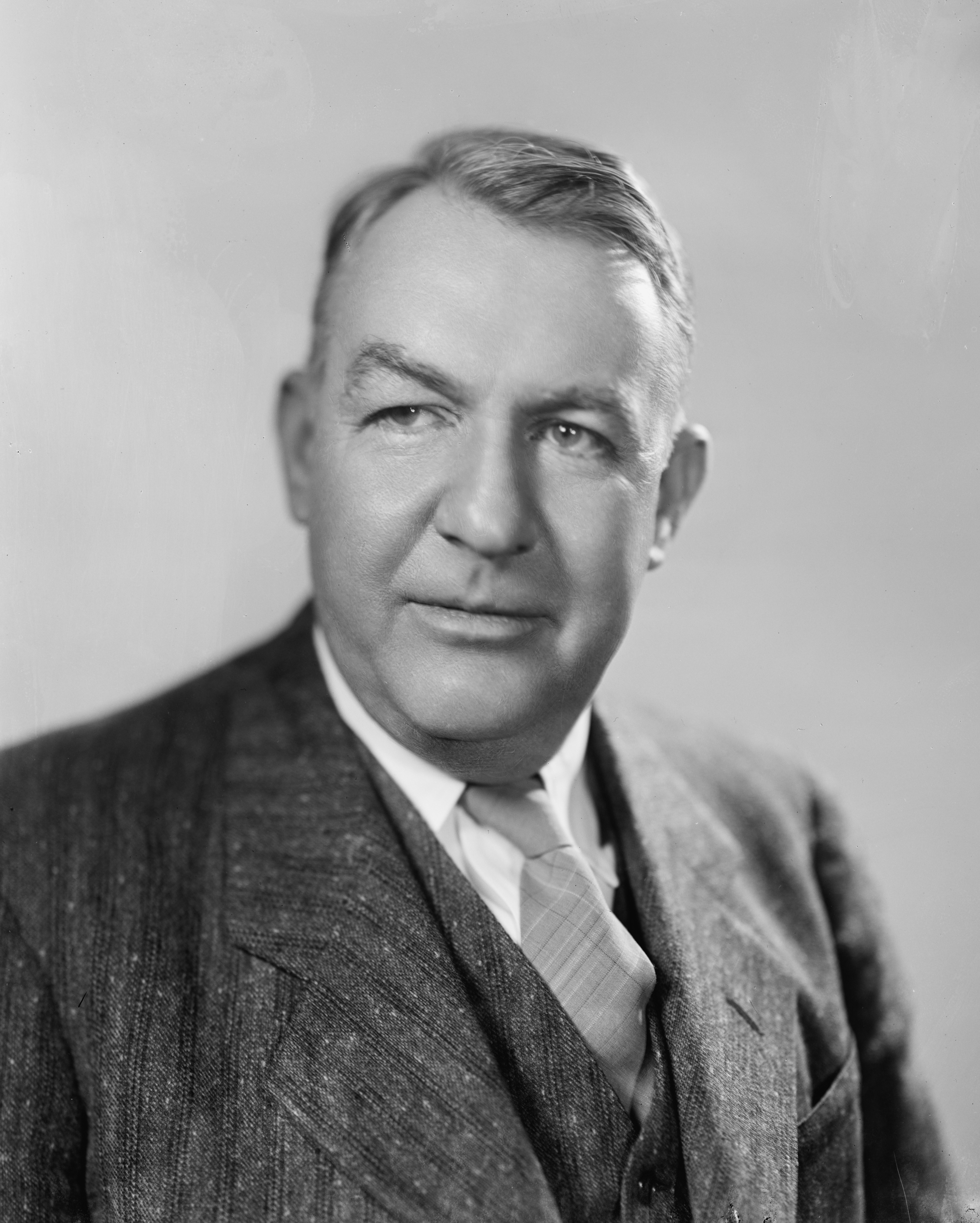

Nominee	Sam Ervin	Claude Greene
Party	Democratic	Republican
Popular vote	491,520	321,635
Percentage	60.45%	39.55%
- County results Ervin: 50–60% 60–70% 70–80% 80–90% >90% Greene: 50–60% 60–70%
Senator before election
Sam Ervin
Democratic
Elected Senator
Sam Ervin
Democratic

The 1962 United States Senate election in North Carolina was held on November 6, 1962. Incumbent Democratic Senator Sam Ervin was re-elected to a second term in office over Republican farmer Claude Greene Jr.

Ervin was elected to a second full (six-year) term, though by a somewhat smaller margin than he enjoyed in his victory in 1956.

== Democratic primary ==
Ervin was unopposed for the Democratic nomination.

== Republican primary ==
=== Results ===
2% of the voting age population participated in the Republican primary.

1962 Republican Senate primary
Party	Candidate	Votes	%
Republican	Claude Greene, Jr.	31,756	61.07%
Republican	Charles H. Babcock	20,246	38.93%
Total votes		52,002	100.00%

== General election ==
=== Results ===
1962 U.S. Senate election in North Carolina
Party	Candidate	Votes	%	±%
Democratic	Sam Ervin (incumbent)	491,520	60.45%	▼6.11
Republican	Claude Greene, Jr.	321,635	39.55%	▲6.11
Total votes		813,155	100.00%	

== Works cited ==
- Steed, Robert; Moreland, Laurence; Baker, Tod, eds. (1980). Party Politics in the South. Praeger Publishers. ISBN 0030565863.
