= Western Piedmont Community College =

College in Morganton, North Carolina, U.S.

- Type: Public community college
- Established: 1964
- Location: Morganton, North Carolina, U.S. 35.721756°N 81.6897872°W
- Campus: Suburban
- Website: www.wpcc.edu

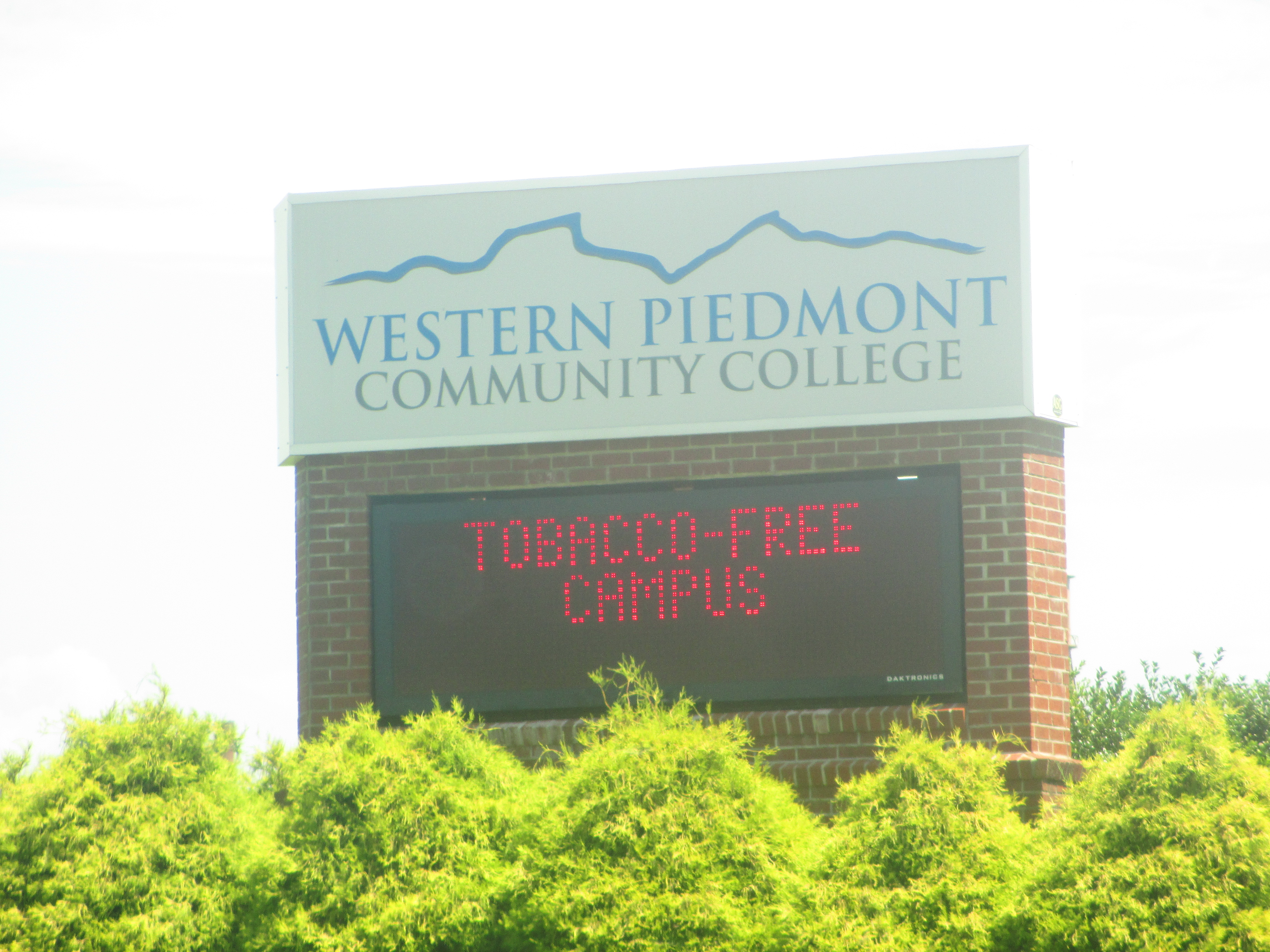
Western Piedmont Community College sign

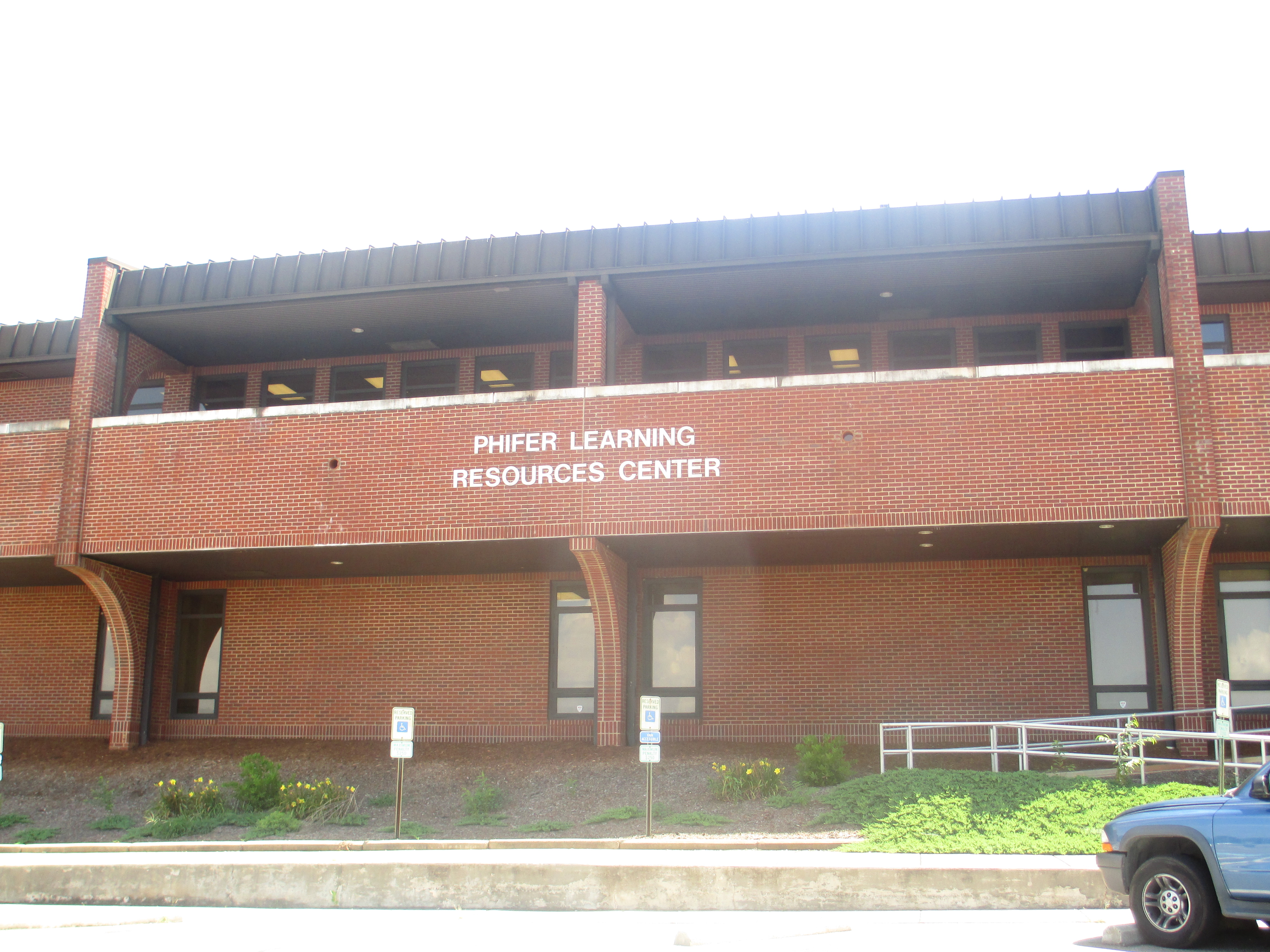
Phifer Learning Resources Center houses the WPCC Library and the Sam J. Ervin Library.

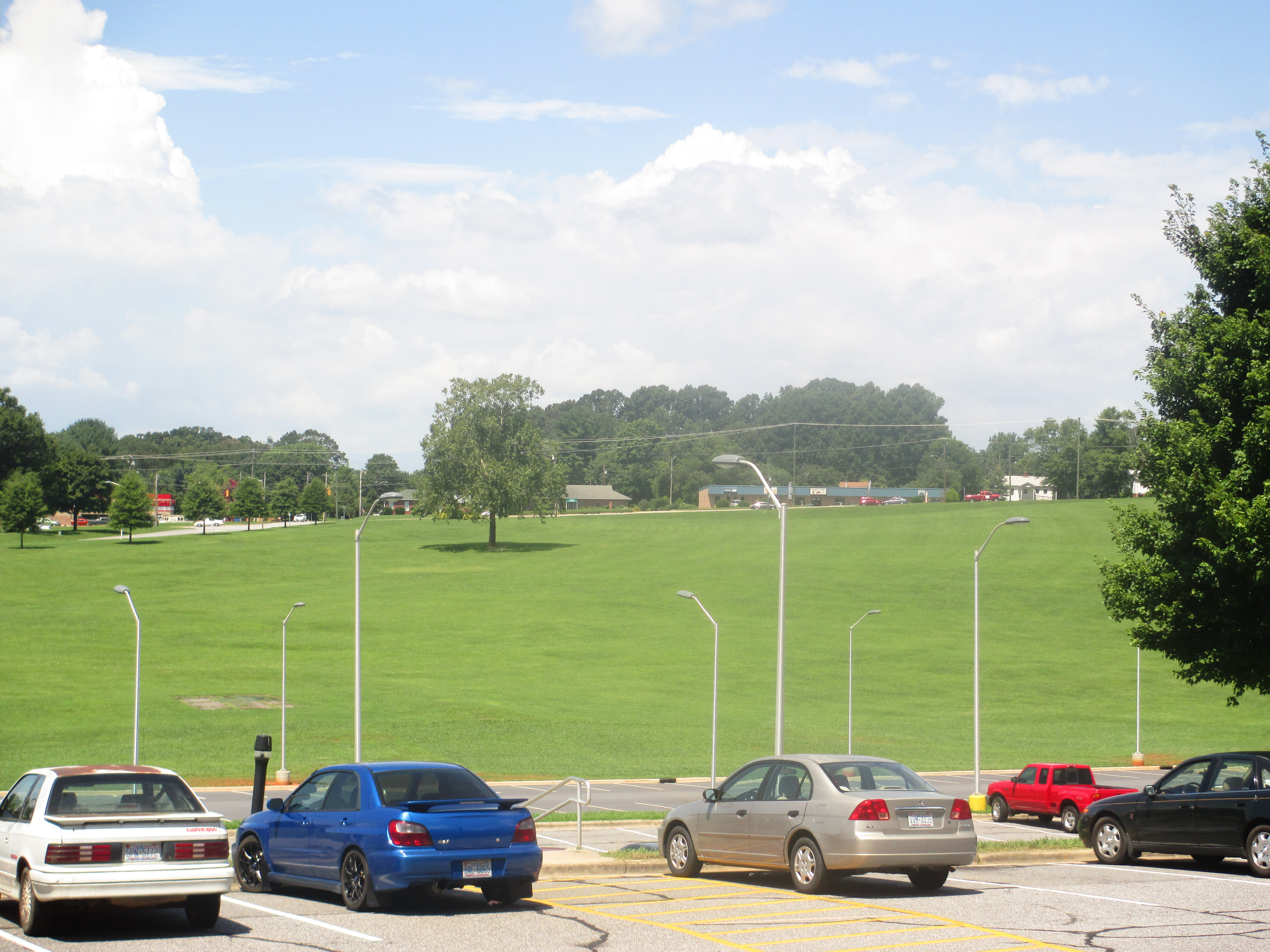
WPCC front lawn

Western Piedmont Community College is a public community college in Morganton, North Carolina. It was chartered on April 2, 1964, as a member of the North Carolina Community College System. The college's Sam J. Ervin Library is named for the U.S. senator and Morganton native who chaired the Senate Watergate hearings in 1973.

The school's nickname is the Pioneers.
