= Joseph Wilson Ervin =

American politician

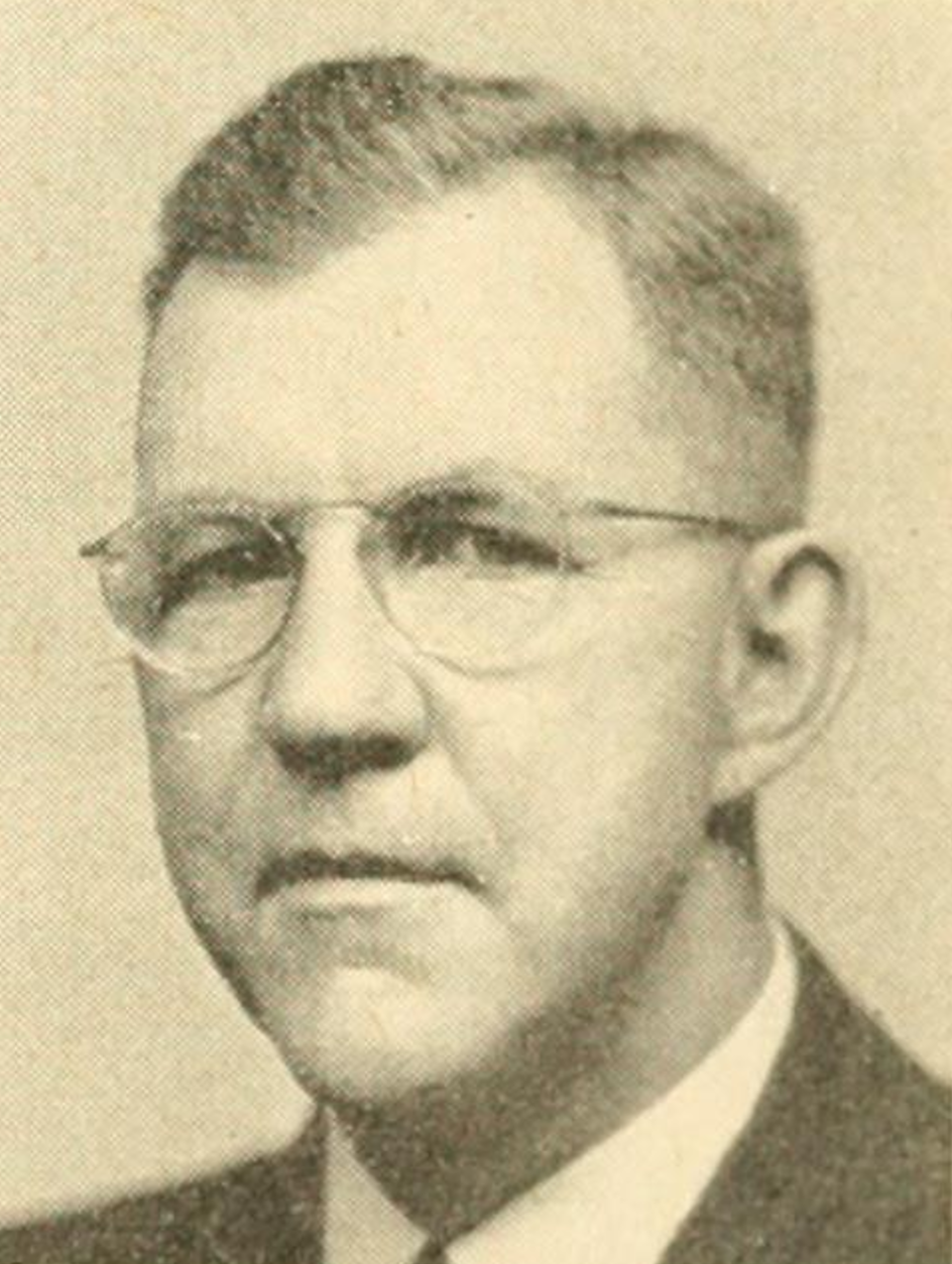

Member of the U.S. House of Representatives from North Carolina's 10th district
- In office January 3, 1945 – December 25, 1945
- Preceded by: Cameron A. Morrison
- Succeeded by: Sam Ervin

Personal details
- Born: March 3, 1901 Morganton, North Carolina, U.S.
- Died: December 25, 1945 (aged 44) Washington, D.C., U.S.
- Party: Democratic
- Education: University of North Carolina at Chapel Hill
- Occupation: Lawyer

Joseph Wilson Ervin (March 3, 1901 – December 25, 1945) was a member of the United States House of Representatives from North Carolina.

== Family background, education and early professional life ==
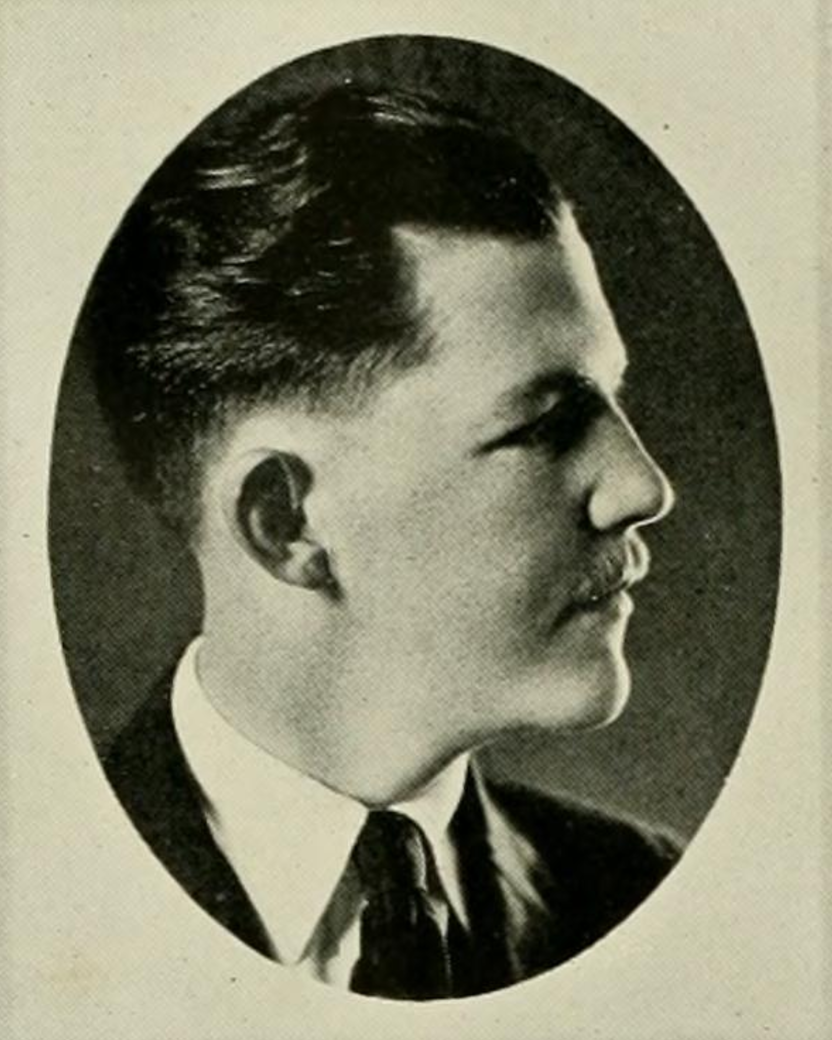
Ervin pictured at the University of North Carolina, c. 1921

Ervin was born in Morganton, Burke County, North Carolina. He was the younger brother of a more famous politician, Sam Ervin.

Ervin attended the public schools, was graduated from the University of North Carolina at Chapel Hill in 1921, where he was a member of the Dialectic Society. and from its law school in 1923. He was admitted to the bar in 1923 and commenced practice in Charlotte, North Carolina.

== U.S. congressman ==
Ervin was elected as a Democrat to the Seventy-ninth Congress and served from January 3, 1945, until his death in Washington, D.C., on December 25, 1945, nearly a year after entering Congress. Ervin was a staunch opponent of the Fair Employment Practice Committee.

== Death ==
Ervin killed himself by inhaling gas from a kitchen stove. This was said to be due to the pain he was suffering from osteomyelitis.

His brother, Sam Ervin, was elected to finish his term.

Joseph Ervin was interred in Forest Hill Cemetery, Morganton, North Carolina.

== See also ==
- List of members of the United States Congress who died in office (1900–1949)

U.S. House of Representatives
Preceded by Cameron A. Morrison	Member of the U.S. House of Representatives from North Carolina's 10th congressional district January 3, 1945 – December 25, 1945	Succeeded by Sam Ervin
