= 1968 United States Senate election in North Carolina =

- November 5, 1968
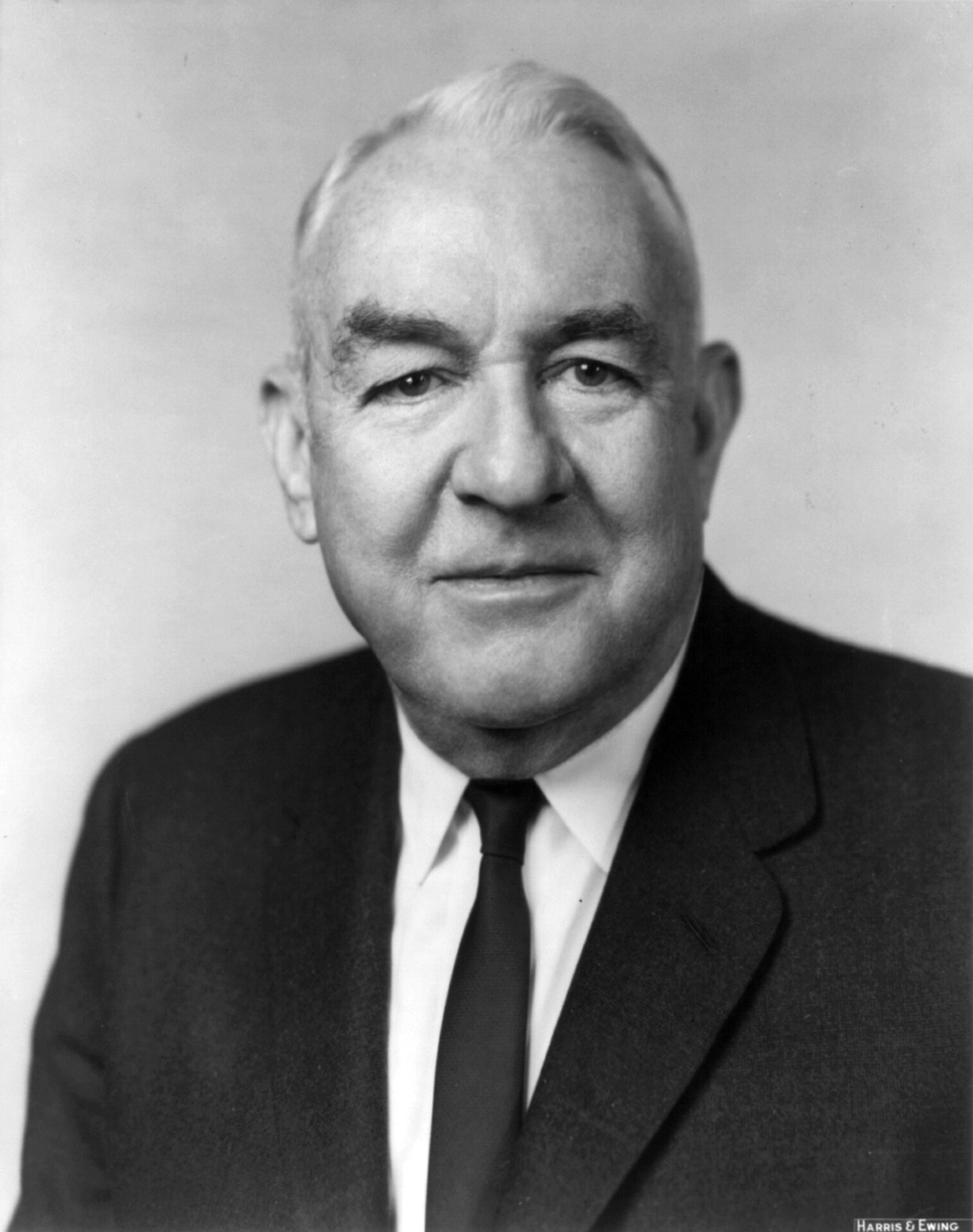

Nominee	Sam Ervin	Robert Somers
Party	Democratic	Republican
Popular vote	870,406	566,834
Percentage	60.56%	39.44%
- County results Ervin: 50–60% 60–70% 70–80% 80–90% >90% Somers: 50–60% 60–70% 70–80%
U.S. senator before election
Sam Ervin
Democratic
Elected U.S. Senator
Sam Ervin
Democratic

The North Carolina United States Senate election of 1968 was held on November 5, 1968 as part of the nationwide elections to the Senate. The general election was fought between the Democratic incumbent Sam Ervin and the Republican nominee Robert Somers. Ervin won re-election to a third full term, with over 60% of the vote. This was the last time any incumbent was re-elected in this seat until 2010. To date, this is also the last time a Democrat was re-elected as a senator in North Carolina.

This is the last time that a U.S. Senate candidate was elected in North Carolina at the same time that a presidential candidate of a different political party won the state.

== Primaries ==
=== Democratic primary ===
22.2% of the voting age population participated in the Democratic primary.

Democratic primary results (U.S. Senate) – May 4, 1968
Party	Candidate	Votes	%
Democratic	Sam Ervin (incumbent)	499,392	78.25%
Democratic	Charles Pratt	60,362	9.46%
Democratic	John Gathings Sr.	48,357	7.58%
Democratic	Fred Brummitt	30,126	4.72%

=== Republican primary ===
4.6% of the voting age population participated in the Republican primary.

Republican primary results (U.S. Senate) – May 4, 1968 (first round)
Party	Candidate	Votes	%
Republican	Robert Somers	48,351	36.62%
Republican	J.L. Zimmerman	43,644	33.06%
Republican	Edwin Tenney Jr.	40,023	30.32%

Republican primary results (U.S. Senate) – June 1, 1968 (runoff)
Party	Candidate	Votes	%
Republican	Robert Somers	8,816	60.59%
Republican	J.L. Zimmerman	5,734	39.41%

== General election ==
The general election was held on November 5, 1968.

1968 North Carolina U.S. Senate election – November 5, 1968
Party	Candidate	Votes	%
Democratic	Sam Ervin	870,406	60.56%
Republican	Robert Somers	566,934	39.44%

== Works cited ==
- Steed, Robert; Moreland, Laurence; Baker, Tod, eds. (1980). Party Politics in the South. Praeger Publishers. ISBN 0030565863.
