= 1956 United States Senate election in North Carolina =

- November 6, 1956
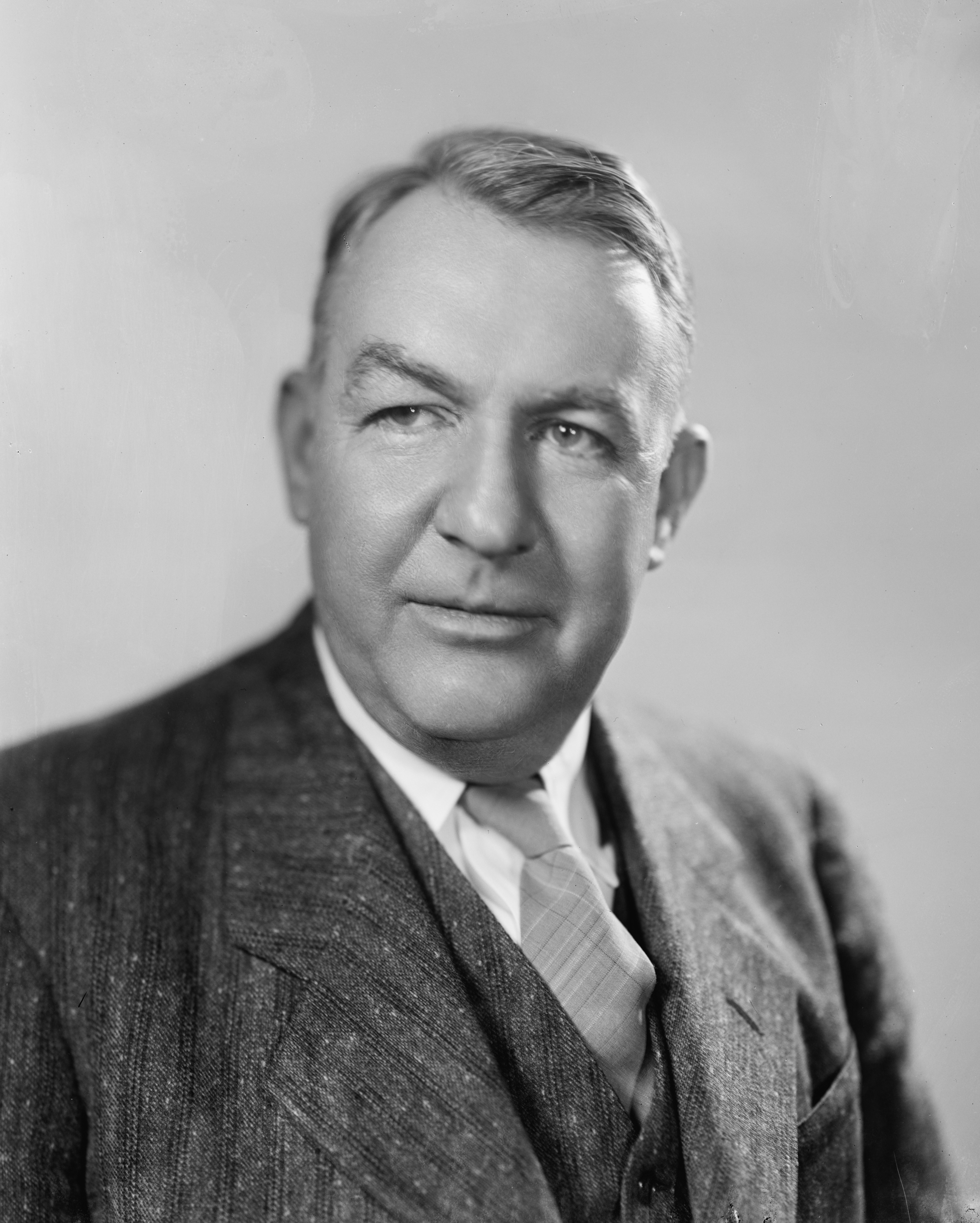

Nominee	Sam Ervin	Joel A. Johnson
Party	Democratic	Republican
Popular vote	731,353	367,475
Percentage	66.56%	33.44%
- County results Ervin: 50–60% 60–70% 70–80% 80–90% >90% Johnson: 50–60% 60–70% 70–80%
Senator before election
Sam Ervin
Democratic
Elected Senator
Sam Ervin
Democratic

The 1956 United States Senate election in North Carolina was held on November 6, 1956. Incumbent Democratic Senator Sam Ervin was re-elected to a second term in office over Republican farmer and businessman Joel Johnson.

== Democratic primary ==
=== Candidates ===
- Sam Ervin, incumbent Senator since 1954
- Marshall C. Kurfees, Mayor of Winston-Salem

17.6% of the voting age population participated in the Democratic primary.

=== Results ===
1956 U.S. Senate election in North Carolina
Party	Candidate	Votes	%
Democratic	Sam Ervin (incumbent)	360,967	84.64%
Democratic	Marshall C. Kurfees	65,512	15.36%
Total votes		426,479	100.00%

== General election ==
=== Results ===
1956 U.S. Senate election in North Carolina
Party	Candidate	Votes	%	±%
Democratic	Sam Ervin (incumbent)	731,353	66.56%	▼33.44
Republican	Joel A. Johnson	367,475	33.44%	▲33.44
Total votes		1,098,828	100.00%	

== Works cited ==
- Steed, Robert; Moreland, Laurence; Baker, Tod, eds. (1980). Party Politics in the South. Praeger Publishers. ISBN 0030565863.
