= Michael Schenck =

American judge (1876–1948)

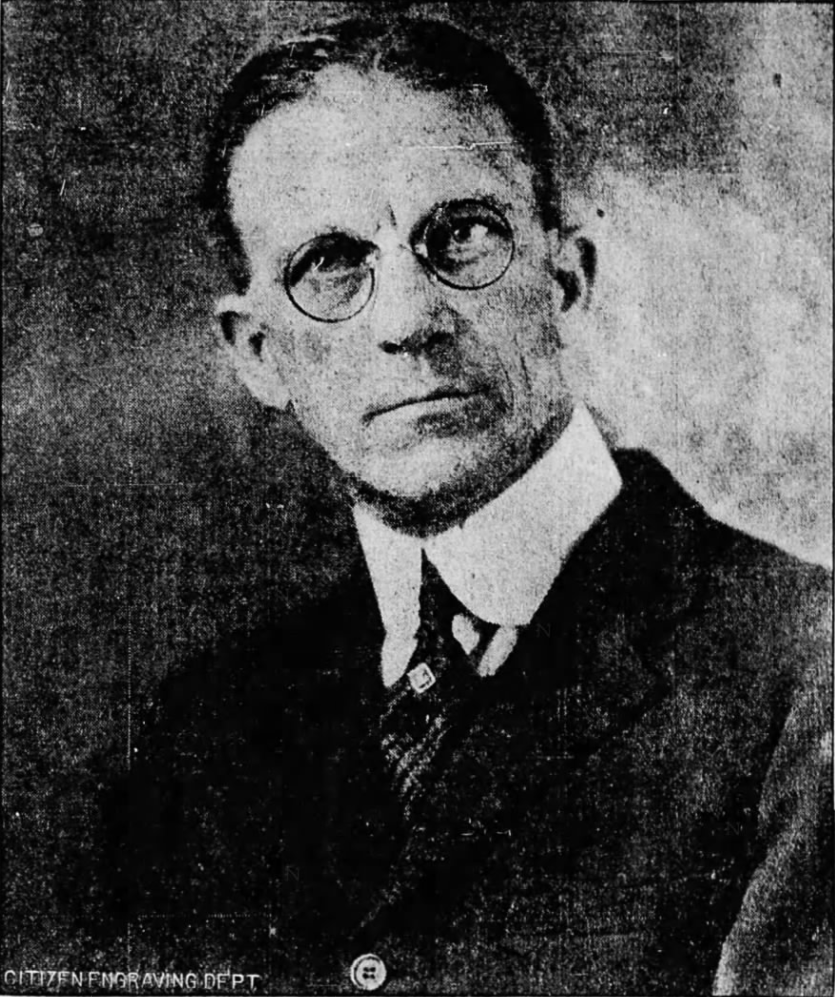
Judge Michael Schenck at the time of his appointment to the district court in 1924.

Michael J. Schenck (December 12, 1876 – November 5, 1948) was a North Carolina lawyer and judge who served as a justice of the North Carolina Supreme Court from 1934 to 1948.

== Early life, education, and civil service ==
Born in Lincolnton, North Carolina to David and Sallie (Ramseur) Schenck, the family had roots in that city going back to the 1790s. Schenck attended high school in Greensboro, North Carolina, and received his undergraduate degree from the University of North Carolina in 1895. After working for a time in the Wilmington offices of the Atlantic Coast Line Railway, he served as a member of the United States insular civil service in Cuba for three years. He received his law degree from North Carolina State University in 1903, and gained admission to the bar in Guilford County, North Carolina, the same year.

Schenck entered the practice of law in Hendersonville, North Carolina, and the following year was elected to a two-year term as the city's mayor, serving from 1907 to 1909. In 1913, Governor Locke Craig appointed Schenck solicitor of the 18th judicial district, to which office Schenck was re-elected the following year. In 1918, he resigned in order to serve in the United States Army Judge Advocate General's Corps, attaining the rank of major. He then returned to private practice.

== Judicial service ==
On November 10, 1924, Governor Cameron A. Morrison appointed Schenck to a seat on the 18th judicial district court vacated by the death of Judge J. Bis Ray. He was reelected to an eight-year term in 1926.

On May 23, 1934, Governor John C. B. Ehringhaus appointed Schenck to a seat on the state supreme court vacated by the death of Justice William J. Adams. Schenck was easily reelected to the seat for an eight-year term in November of that year. Schenck ran unopposed for reelection in November 1942, and resigned from the court due to illness in January 1948, ten months before his death.

== Personal life and death ==
On November 15, 1909, Schenck married Rose Few of Hendersonville, with whom he had a son and two daughters.

He died at his home in Raleigh at the age of 71, after a lengthy period of illness.

Political offices
Preceded by William J. Adams	Justice of the North Carolina Supreme Court; 1934–1948	Succeeded by Sam Ervin
