= Hamilton C. Jones III House =

Historic house in North Carolina, United States

- U.S. National Register of Historic Places
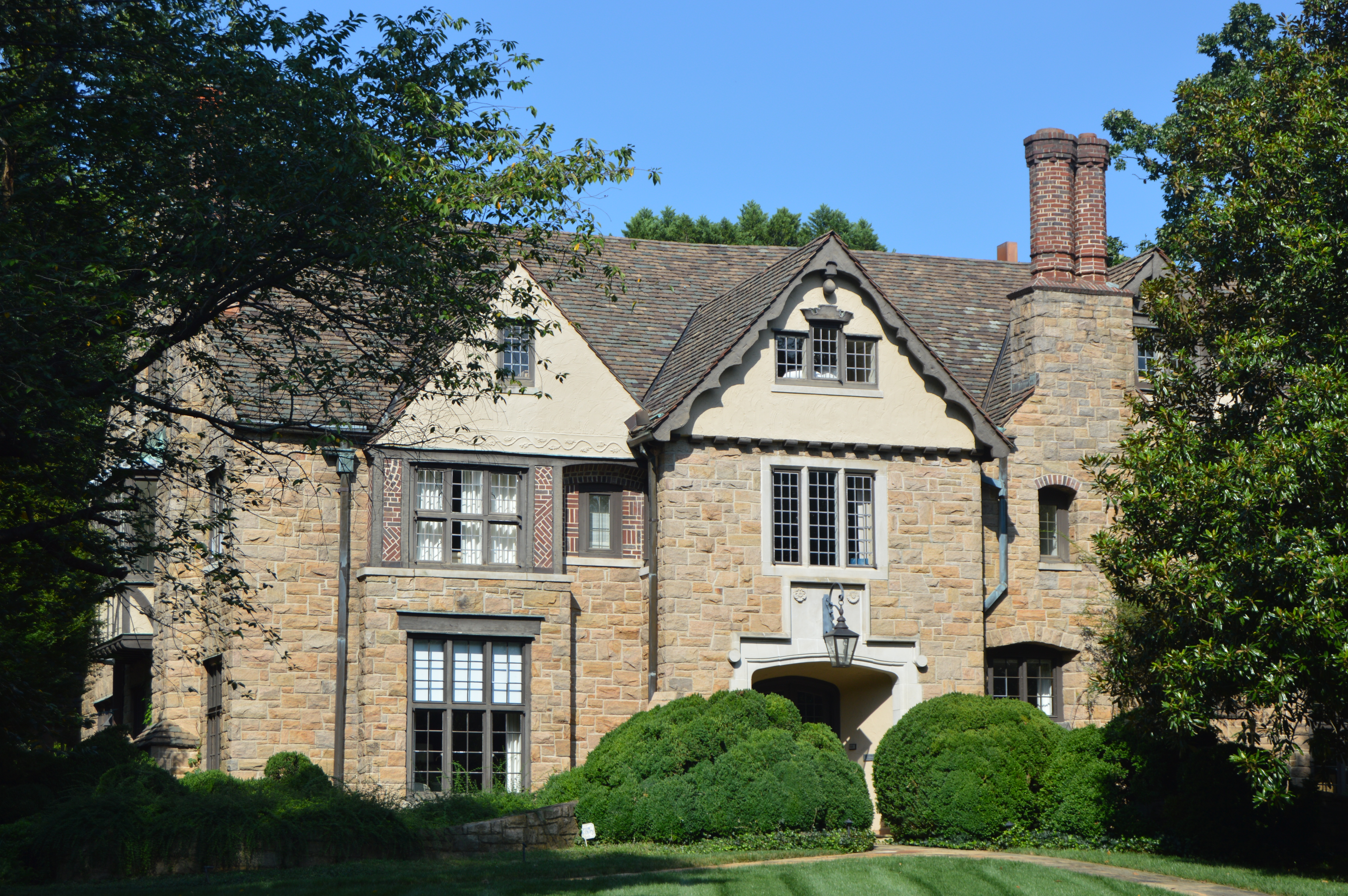
- Facade

- Location within North Carolina Location within the United States
- Location: 201 Cherokee Rd., Charlotte, North Carolina
- Coordinates: 35°12′5″N 80°49′18″W
- Area: 1.1 acres (0.45 ha)
- Built: 1929–1931
- Built by: Blythe-Isenhour
- Architect: Martin E. Boyer
- Architectural style: Tudor Revival
- NRHP reference No.: 02000439
- Added to NRHP: May 2, 2002

Hamilton C. Jones III House, also known as The Stone House, is a historic home located at Charlotte, Mecklenburg County, North Carolina. It was built between 1929 and 1931, and is a massive, 2 1/2-story, four-bay, granite, Tudor Revival style dwelling. It is constructed of four-inch terra cotta tiles sheathed in ashlar granite, stucco, and half-timbering, and has a side-gable roof with dormers. It is a 1 1/2-story service ell. Also on the property is a contributing playhouse. It was the home of Congressman Hamilton C. Jones.

It was listed on the National Register of Historic Places in 2002.
