= Hamilton C. Jones =

American politician

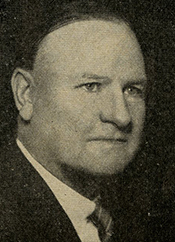
Hamilton C. Jones

Hamilton Chamberlain Jones (September 26, 1884 – August 10, 1957) was a United States representative from North Carolina. He was born in Charlotte, North Carolina, and attended the schools of Charlotte, Central High School in Washington, D.C., and Horner Military School in Oxford, North Carolina. He graduated from the University of North Carolina at Chapel Hill in 1906 and Columbia Law School in 1907, having studied law at both institutions. At UNC he was a member of Sigma Alpha Epsilon fraternity.

Jones was admitted to the bar in 1906 and commenced practice in Charlotte in 1910, and also engaged in various agricultural pursuits. He was Judge of City Recorder's Court and Juvenile Court of Charlotte from 1913 to 1919, assistant United States district attorney for the western district of North Carolina from 1919 to 1921, and served in the State senate from 1925 to 1927. He was a trustee of the University of North Carolina.

Jones lost four Democratic primary nominations for the U. S. House, in 1930, 1934, 1938, and 1944, before winning nomination and election in 1946 to the Eightieth Congress. His success was enabled by the suicide of the incumbent and the election of a deliberately temporary replacement, the future Sen. Sam J. Ervin, Jr. Jones was reelected to the Eighty-first and Eighty-second Congresses but was an unsuccessful candidate for reelection in 1952 on facing his first Republican opponent of distinction. Jones served from January 3, 1947, to January 3, 1953. For someone who tried so long to get to the House, his apparent impact was minimal. He served on the minor Veterans’ Affairs Committee and introduced only 14 bills. None were enacted, although one veterans bill did pass the House.

He resumed the practice of law, dying in Charlotte, North Carolina, on August 10, 1957. Jones was interred in Evergreen Cemetery. His home at Charlotte, the Hamilton C. Jones III House, was listed on the National Register of Historic Places in 2002.

North Carolina Senate
Preceded by Frank Armfield; James Lester DeLaney	Member of the North Carolina Senate from the 20th district 1925–1927; Served alongside: William A. Foil	Succeeded by Fabius J. Haywood; David Baird Smith
U.S. House of Representatives
Preceded by Sam J. Ervin, Jr.	Member of the U.S. House of Representatives from North Carolina's 10th congressional district 1947–1953	Succeeded by Charles R. Jonas
