= Broadus Miller =

Broadus Miller (c. 1904–1927) was an African American man who in 1927 was accused of killing a young Morganton, North Carolina mill worker named Gladys Kincaid. For nearly two weeks after the killing, hundreds of police, posse members, and private bounty hunters pursued Miller in what was the largest manhunt that had ever taken place in western North Carolina up to that time. After a posse member shot and killed Miller, his body was brought back to Morganton and displayed on the courthouse square, attracting several thousand spectators.

== Background ==
A native of Greenwood County, South Carolina, Broadus Miller had served three years in the South Carolina state penitentiary for the 1921 murder of an African American woman, who had been clubbed to death with a baseball bat. At his trial for the murder, a court-appointed psychiatrist testified that Miller suffered from severe mental illness.

== The murder of Gladys Kincaid ==
After Miller's release from the South Carolina penitentiary, he moved to North Carolina, where in the spring of 1927 he was hired as a construction laborer in building the Frank Tate House in the town of Morganton. On the evening of June 21, 1927, fifteen-year-old Gladys Kincaid was bludgeoned to death while walking home from her job in a local hosiery mill. Police immediately suspected Miller, who had been seen in the vicinity of where the victim's body was found, and during a search of Miller's boardinghouse room discovered a raincoat spattered with fresh blood stains. However, Miller had disappeared.

The murder of young Kincaid outraged many local residents, causing potential lynch mobs to conduct a frenzied search for the accused killer. In his role as county attorney, Morganton resident Sam Ervin, Jr. (who would later gain national fame as a U. S. Senator) served as legal adviser for local officials, who promptly used a provision of North Carolina state law to declare Broadus Miller an outlaw, meaning that he could legally be shot and killed by any pursuer, whether a policeman or a private citizen. Local newspaper publisher Beatrice Cobb, one of the most prominent women journalists in the state and secretary of the North Carolina Press Association, penned a series of racially inflammatory editorials denouncing Miller as a “beast.” County officials and local businessmen posted large rewards for Miller, dead or alive, and North Carolina governor Angus W. McLean authorized a state-sponsored reward as well; the public and private rewards offered for Miller would eventually total nearly $2,000, prompting hundreds of private citizens to join in the manhunt. Because of the inflamed racial tensions within Morganton, and in order to prevent a potential lynching, Governor McLean deployed National Guard troops to patrol the streets of the town. Using bloodhounds, law enforcement officials eventually tracked Broadus Miller to the mountain woods of neighboring Caldwell County, where for over a week hunters pursued the outlaw. On Sunday, July 3, 1927, a posse member shot and killed Miller in the woods near the community of Linville Falls. That afternoon Miller's dead body was brought back to Morganton and displayed on the courthouse square, an exhibition that attracted several thousand spectators from both Morganton and adjacent towns. In the evening, fearing that local residents would attempt to desecrate the corpse, local officials shipped the body by train to Statesville, where the following morning Broadus Miller was quietly buried in an unmarked grave.

== Ballads ==
The Broadus Miller case inspired a number of folk ballads. Penned by anonymous composers and set to traditional folk melodies, these ballads were widely sung throughout western North Carolina. One of these ballads, entitled “The Tragedy of Gladys Kincaid” or simply “Gladys Kincaid,” was collected by Professor Frank C. Brown of the North Carolina Folklore Society sometime before 1943. Another ballad, also known as “Gladys Kincaid,” was included by folklorist Mellinger Henry in his 1934 work Songs Sung in the Southern Appalachians.
