= Sam Ervin =

United States Senator and jurist (1896–1985)

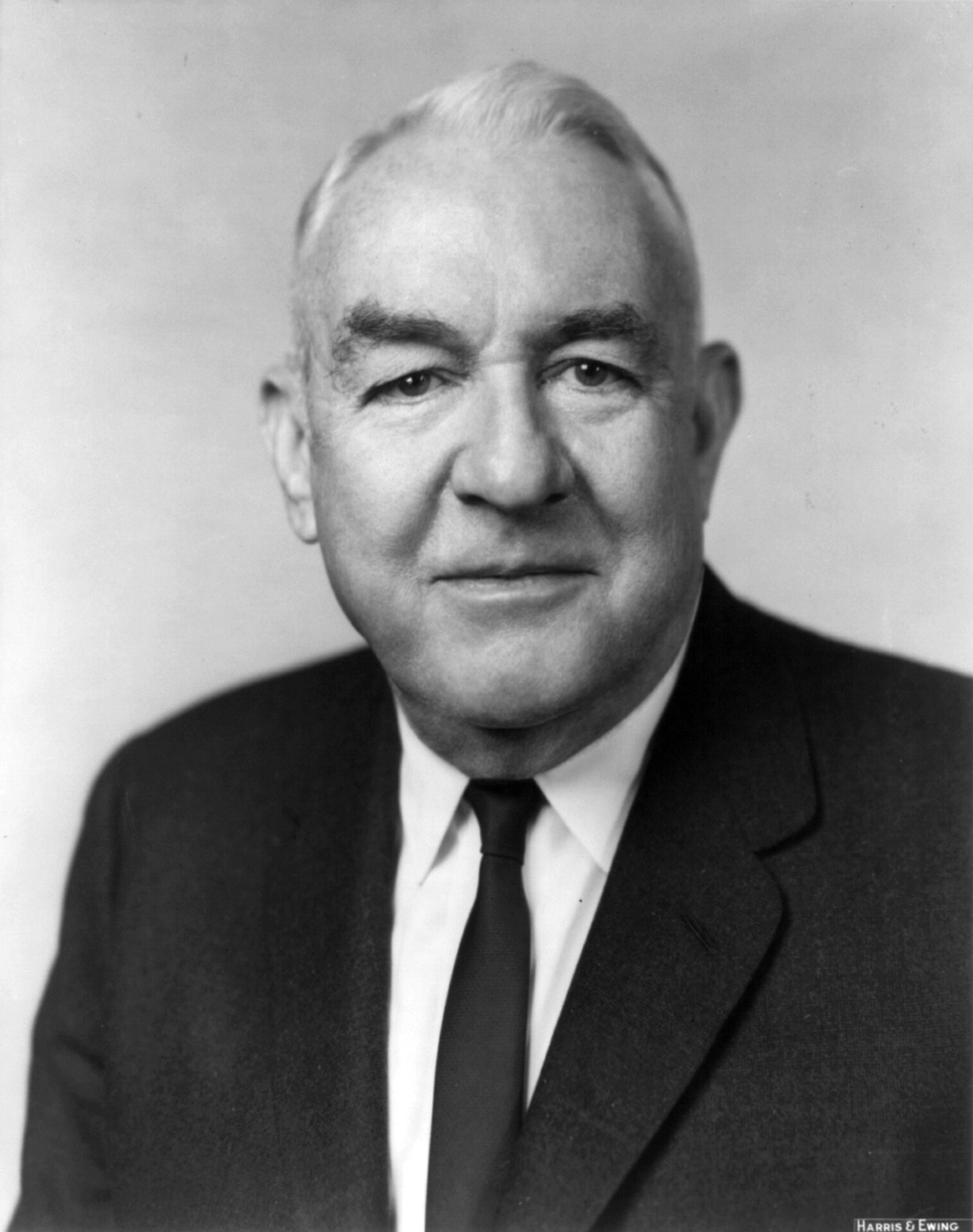

United States Senator from North Carolina
- In office June 5, 1954 – December 31, 1974
- Preceded by: Clyde R. Hoey
- Succeeded by: Robert B. Morgan
Committee chairmanships
Chair of the Senate Government Operations Committee
In office July 28, 1972 – December 31, 1974
Preceded by	John McClellan
Succeeded by	Abe Ribicoff

Associate Justice of the North Carolina Supreme Court
- In office February 3, 1948 – June 5, 1954
- Nominated by: R. Gregg Cherry
- Preceded by: Michael Schenck
- Succeeded by: Carlisle W. Higgins

Member of the U.S. House of Representatives from North Carolina's 10th district
- In office January 22, 1946 – January 3, 1947
- Preceded by: Joseph Wilson Ervin
- Succeeded by: Hamilton C. Jones

Member of the North Carolina House of Representatives from the Burke County district
- In office 1931–1933
- Preceded by: John Mull
- Succeeded by: Francis Garrou
- In office 1923–1927
- Preceded by: Joseph Cooper
- Succeeded by: John Giles

Personal details
- Born: Samuel James Ervin Jr. September 27, 1896 Morganton, North Carolina, U.S.
- Died: April 23, 1985 (aged 88) Winston-Salem, North Carolina, U.S.
- Party: Democratic
- Spouse: Margaret Bruce Bell (m. 1924)
- Children: 3, including Samuel
- Education: University of North Carolina at Chapel Hill (BA); Harvard University (LLB)

Military service
- Allegiance: United States
- Branch/service: United States Army
- Years of service: 1917–1919
- Rank: Private
- Unit: Company I, 28th Infantry Regiment, 1st Infantry Division
- Battles/wars: World War I
- Awards: Distinguished Service Cross; Silver Star; Purple Heart (2)

Samuel James Ervin Jr. (September 27, 1896 – April 23, 1985) was an American conservative politician who served as a U.S. senator from North Carolina from 1954 to 1974. A Southern Democrat, he liked to call himself a "country lawyer", and often told humorous stories in his Southern drawl. During his Senate career, Ervin was at first a staunch defender of Jim Crow laws and racial segregation, as the South's constitutional expert during the congressional debates on civil rights. However, unexpectedly, he became a liberal hero for his support of civil liberties. He is remembered for his work in the investigation committees that brought down Senator Joseph McCarthy in 1954 and especially for his leadership of the Senate committee's investigation of the Watergate scandal that led to the resignation of President Richard Nixon in 1974.

== Early life and education ==
Ervin was born in Morganton, North Carolina, the son of Laura Theresa (Powe) and Samuel James Ervin. He served in the U.S. Army in combat in France during World War I with the First Division at Cantigny and Soissons, and was awarded the Distinguished Service Cross, the Silver Star and two Purple Hearts. He graduated from the University of North Carolina, where he was a member of the Dialectic and Philanthropic Societies, in 1917 and from Harvard Law School in 1922. Ervin was fond of joking that he was the only student ever to go through Harvard Law "backwards", because he took the third-year courses first, then the second-year courses, and finally the first-year courses.

Already admitted to the bar in 1919, before completing law school (later calling himself "a simple country lawyer"), Ervin entered politics straight out of Harvard. Even before he had received his degree, Democrats in Burke County had nominated him in absentia for the North Carolina House of Representatives, to which he was elected in 1922, 1924, and 1930. In 1927, in his role as attorney for Burke County, Ervin served as the legal advisor to the local sheriff during the hunt for Broadus Miller, a black man believed to have murdered a teenaged white girl. The county officials invoked the outlaw provision of the North Carolina constitution which permitted any citizen to kill a declared outlaw without formal charges being brought. Miller was shot down while being pursued and his body displayed in the local courthouse square. Ervin was also elected and served as a state judge in the late 1930s and early 1940s. In December 1945, Ervin's brother, U.S. Representative Joseph Wilson Ervin, died in office. Ervin won the subsequent special election to complete the term, and served from January 22, 1946 to January 3, 1947.

== U.S. Senate career ==
In 1948, Ervin was appointed to a seat as an associate justice of the North Carolina Supreme Court vacated by the resignation of Michael Schenck, and was serving in that capacity when he was appointed in June 1954 by Governor William B. Umstead to fill the U.S. Senate seat of Clyde Hoey, who had died in office. He ran successfully for the seat in November 1954.

Ervin made a deep impact on American history through his work on two separate committees at the beginning and ending of his career that were critical in bringing down two powerful opponents: Senator Joe McCarthy in 1954 and President Richard M. Nixon in 1974. In 1954, then-Vice President Richard Nixon appointed Ervin to a committee formed to investigate whether McCarthy should be censured by the Senate. The Senate Select Committee to Investigate Campaign Practices, which investigated Watergate, was popularly known as the "Ervin Committee".

In 1956, Senator Ervin helped organize resistance to the 1954 Brown v. Board of Education Supreme Court decision calling for desegregation of schools by drafting The Southern Manifesto; this influential document encouraged defiance of desegregation and was signed by all but a few of the Southern members of Congress. (In his autobiography, Preserving the Constitution, Ervin said he later changed his mind on the Brown decision, stating that the decision, to the extent it eliminated mandatory segregation, was correct, but that forced integration, required under later decisions, was improper.)

Ervin voted against the Civil Rights Acts of 1957, the Civil Rights Acts of 1960, the Civil Rights Acts of 1964, and the Civil Rights Acts of 1968 as well as the 24th Amendment to the U.S. Constitution and the Voting Rights Act of 1965. Some historians consider Ervin's position to be one of "cognitive dissonance" because he opposed federal legislation to combat race-based discrimination, but did not do so in harsh terms. While he once maintained that Americans were entitled to "their prejudices as well as their allergies", Ervin's defenders claim he did not seem to be motivated by prejudice himself, but more by his suspicion of federal power. Ervin said he disliked what the Warren Court "has done to the Constitution".

He sat on the McClellan Committee (1957–60), which probed organized crime within trade unions. On March 30, 1965, Ervin announced that he would offer a substitute to the Johnson administration's voting rights bill. Ervin referred to the administration's bill as cockeyed and unconstitutional, and that his version would provide for federal registers being appointed in areas certified to having findings of racial discrimination as defined under the Fifteenth Amendment to the United States Constitution. Ervin said he would seek approval of the Senate Judiciary Committee and that he would carry the fight to the Senate floor in case the committee rejected his legislation.

Ervin was also a staunch opponent of the Immigration and Nationality Act of 1965 which abolished nationality quotas beginning in 1968. He felt that the principle of tying allowed numbers of immigrants from a given country to the number of people who had ancestral origins in that country and lived in the United States should be retained.

Meanwhile, Ervin's strict construction of the Constitution also made him a liberal hero for his support of civil liberties, his opposition to "no knock" search laws, and the growing intrusions of data banks and lie-detector tests as invasions of privacy. In 1966, Senator Ervin played a major role in the defeat of Senator Everett Dirksen's Constitutional amendment to allow prayer in public schools. Ervin also favored the exclusionary rule under the Fourth Amendment, which made illegally seized evidence inadmissible in criminal trials.

Ervin was a strong proponent of American involvement in the Vietnam War, and once said "We ought to bomb the North Vietnamese out of existence."

In November 1970, Ervin was one of three Senators (all from Southern states, the others being James Eastland and Strom Thurmond) to vote against an occupational safety bill that would establish federal supervision to oversee working conditions. In Ervin's case, he was attempting to make it possible for North Carolina to continue its lax regulation of workplace safety, as evidenced by the Hamlet chicken processing plant fire.

When the Senate voted on the Equal Rights Amendment (ERA) in 1971, Ervin proposed an amendment that would exempt women from the draft; Ervin's amendment to the ERA overwhelmingly failed. However, he was a staunch opponent of the ERA, and after it passed the Senate Ervin used his influence to dissuade the North Carolina General Assembly from ratifying it, maintaining that it was the "height of folly to command legislative bodies to ignore sex in making laws".

He became involved in Senate investigations before Watergate, when in January 1970 it was revealed by Christopher Pyle, an investigator for Ervin's Judiciary Subcommittee on Constitutional Rights, that the U.S. Army was performing domestic investigations on the civilian population. Ervin's further work in the matter over the following years, together with the Church Committee inquiries, led to passage of the Foreign Intelligence Surveillance Act (after Ervin had left office).

=== Senate Watergate Committee ===
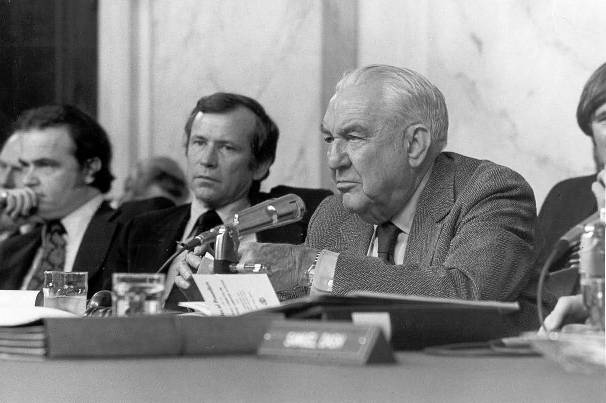
Sam Ervin (right), as chair of the Senate Watergate Committee alongside Howard Baker (center) and Fred Thompson (left)

The Chairman is fond of pointing out from time to time that he is just a country lawyer. He omits to say that he graduated from Harvard Law School with honors.

— Senate Watergate Committee vice-chairman Howard Baker (R-TN) on Ervin during the Watergate Hearings

Ervin gained lasting fame through his stewardship of the Senate Select Committee to Investigate Campaign Practices, also known as the Senate Watergate Committee, from the 1972 presidential election. Senate Majority Leader Mike Mansfield chose Ervin because it was unlikely Ervin was going to run for re-election in 1974 (and in fact did not), had no aspirations beyond his office, had deep knowledge of the law and the Constitution, and because he was considered to be an even-keeled, conservative, independent-minded Democrat. President Nixon thought at first that Ervin might potentially be supportive, but that turned out to not be the case.

During the hearings, after announcing that the committee was issuing a subpoena for the Nixon White House tapes following Alexander Butterfield revealing the existence of the taping system installed in the Oval Office, Ervin proclaimed that Watergate had surpassed the American Civil War as the worst tragedy in the country's history. He also famously sparred with Nixon chief domestic policy advisor John Ehrlichman about whether constitutional law allowed a President to sanction such actions as the White House Plumbers' break-in at the Democratic National Committee headquarters at the Watergate office complex and their break-in at the office of the psychiatrist to Daniel Ellsberg, the former assistant to the Assistant Secretary of Defense for International Security Affairs who had leaked the Pentagon Papers.

Ervin: But the foreign intelligence activities was not – had nothing to do with the...the opinion of Ellsberg's psychiatrist about his intellectual or emotional or psychological state!
Ehrlichman: How do you know that, Mr. Chairman?
Ervin: Because I can understand the English language! It's my mother tongue!

Applause ensued, and Ervin had to bang his gavel to restore order. Following the 1972 elections, Ervin proposed five bills to limit the power of the presidency. Two restricted the President's ability to use funds for reasons other than their appropriated purpose, one allowed more congressional oversight of appointed officials, one banned the President from pocket vetoing legislation when Congress was not in session, and the final bill required the President to inform Congress of any executive agreements made with foreign governments.

=== Resignation ===
As a result of numerous ongoing disputes with the Senate Democratic leadership and the Democratic National Committee, Ervin resigned in December 1974, just before his term ended.

== Later life ==
After retirement, Ervin practiced law, wrote several books, and appeared in various commercials for products. As a lawyer, he served as a co-counsel with Womble Carlyle Sandridge & Rice PLLC on several high-profile cases, including a successful appeal in Joyner v. Duncan. In 1973, Ervin was recorded on CBS Records for the LP record, Senator Sam at Home, which featured tracks of Ervin speaking his mind and telling anecdotes, separated by tracks of him singing popular songs. One of those songs, "Bridge Over Troubled Water" was released as a single, and subsequently appeared on the 1991 compilation album Golden Throats 2.

Ervin was initiated into the Freemasons, where he was elevated to the 33rd and highest degree of Master Mason.

Ervin died in 1985 at a hospital in Winston-Salem, North Carolina, from complications of emphysema. He was 88 years old. His funeral was attended by numerous dignitaries, including former president Richard Nixon and members of his administration.

== Legacy ==
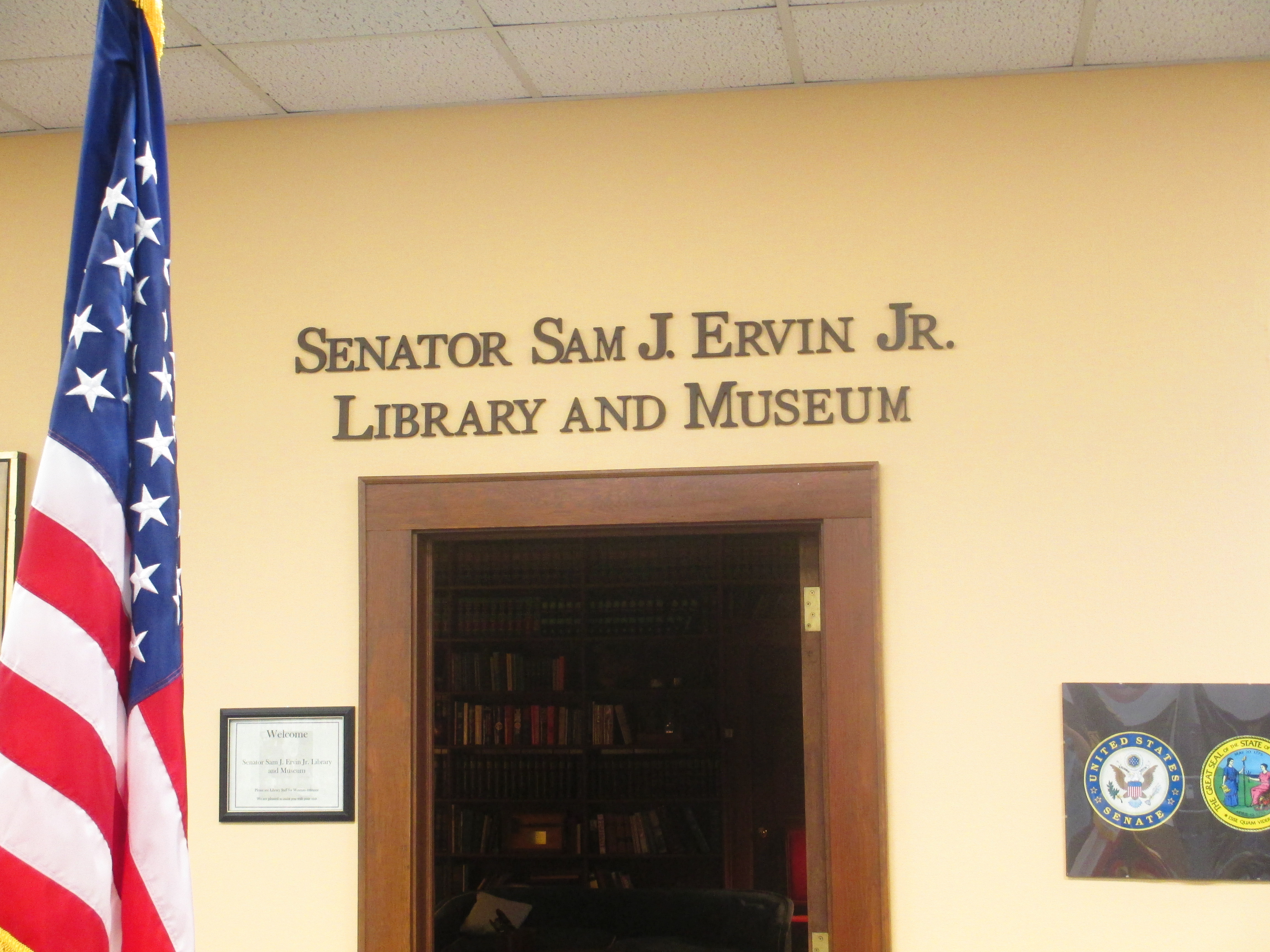
Entrance to Ervin Library at Western Piedmont Community College in Morganton

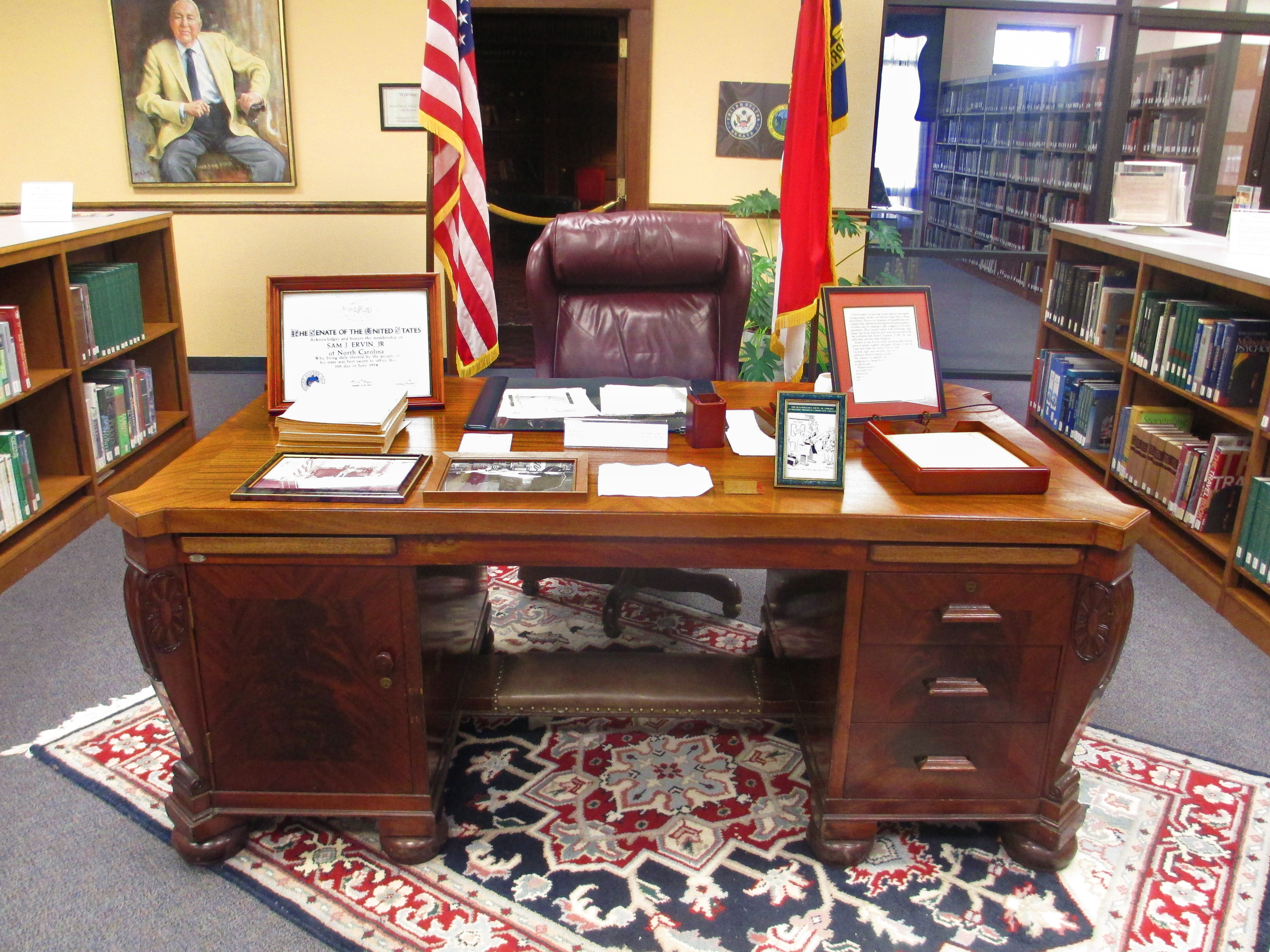
Ervin's Senate desk

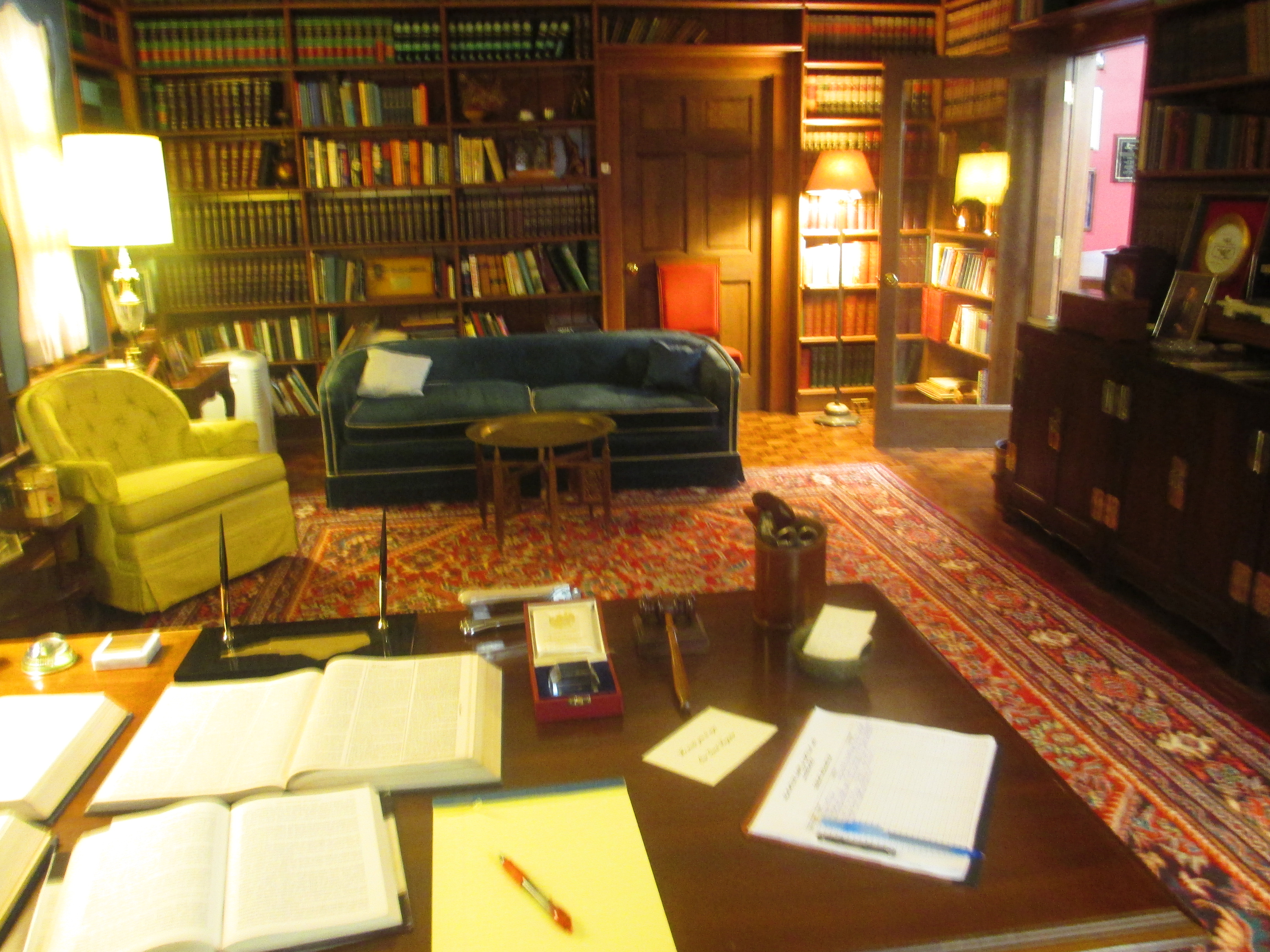
A glimpse of Ervin's restored office

Ervin's son, Samuel J. Ervin, III, was appointed in 1980 to the United States Court of Appeals for the Fourth Circuit by President Jimmy Carter. His grandson, Sam J. Ervin, IV, was elected in 2008 to the North Carolina Court of Appeals and in 2014 to the North Carolina Supreme Court. Another grandson, Robert C. Ervin, was elected in 2002 as a North Carolina Superior Court Judge for District 25A.

Ervin's office and personal library has been preserved as the "Senator Sam J. Ervin Jr. Library and Museum", which is housed in the Phifer Learning Resource Center at Western Piedmont Community College in his hometown of Morganton, NC.

=== Privacy activism ===
In a 1964 essay called "The Naked Society", Vance Packard criticized advertisers' unfettered use of private information to create marketing schemes. He compared a recent Great Society initiative by then-president Lyndon B. Johnson, the National Data Bank, to the use of information by advertisers and argued for increased data privacy measures to ensure that information did not find its way into the wrong hands. The essay inspired Ervin to fight what he saw as Johnson's flagrant disregard for consumer privacy. He criticized Johnson's domestic agenda as invasive and saw the unfiltered database of consumers' information as a sign of presidential abuse of power. Ervin warned that "The computer never forgets".

== Accolades ==
- 1972: Paul White Award, Radio Television Digital News Association
- 1981: Golden Plate Award of the American Academy of Achievement

== Quotations ==
In an interview on William F. Buckley's Firing Line program, Ervin suggested that people in public life need to have more "backbone", and Buckley playfully suggested Gordon Liddy as a model to which Ervin responded, "Well, Gordon Liddy has a little too much backbone. I'll have to admit that I have a sort of sneaking admiration for a fellow like Gordon Liddy that does have an excess of backbone. His backbone exceeds his intelligence, really."

Ervin was a staunch opponent of the polygraph calling the tests "20th century witchcraft":

Probably no instrument in modern time so lends itself to threats to constitutional guarantees of individual freedom as the polygraph or so-called lie detector. The threat of its use or the intimidation inherent in its use restricts free expression and communication of ideas, intrudes on an individual's subconscious thought, makes him fear to speak his thoughts freely, or compels him to speak against his will. To my mind, the entire purpose of these machines is to invade a man's mind and find what lurks in the innermost part of his mental consciousness for reasons which have nothing to do with his ability to perform a job. If the right of privacy means anything at all and if it is a right to be cherished in our society, it means that people should be entitled to have thoughts, hopes, desires, and dreams that are beyond the reach of a bureaucrat, an employer, or an electronic technician. This is something which enthusiasts for these machines do not seem to understand. They do not understand and they do not appreciate how important privacy is to each American, and as long as that lesson is not understood, we all will find our right to privacy constricted if not abrogated entirely. I propose this legislation to ban the use of the polygraph for employment purposes in the hopes that Congress will pause for a moment, step back, and take a long look at the issues involved in the unrestrained use of the polygraph. Legislation is necessary to bring some order and control to the practice ...

He also famously said of religion and government:

Political freedom cannot exist in any land where religion controls the state, and religious freedom cannot exist in any land where the state controls religion.

On civil liberties and equal rights:

"Equal civil liberties for all and special civil rights for some are incompatible in concept and operation." Preserving the Constitution, p. 163

== See also ==
- List of members of the American Legion
- Slow Burn (podcast)

U.S. House of Representatives
Preceded by Joseph Ervin	Member of the U.S. House of Representatives from North Carolina's 10th congressional district 1946–1947	Succeeded by Hamilton C. Jones
Party political offices
Preceded by Clyde R. Hoey	Democratic nominee for U.S. Senator from North Carolina (Class 3); 1954, 1956, 1962, 1968	Succeeded by Robert Burren Morgan
U.S. Senate
Preceded by Clyde Hoey	U.S. Senator (Class 3) from North Carolina; 1954–1974; Served alongside: Alton Asa Lennon, William Kerr Scott, B. Everett Jordan, Jesse Helms	Succeeded by Robert Morgan
Preceded by John L. McClellan	Chair of the Senate Government Operations Committee; 1972–1974	Succeeded by Abraham Ribicoff
New office	Chair of the Senate Watergate Committee; 1973–1974	Position abolished
