= Robert B. Morgan =

American politician

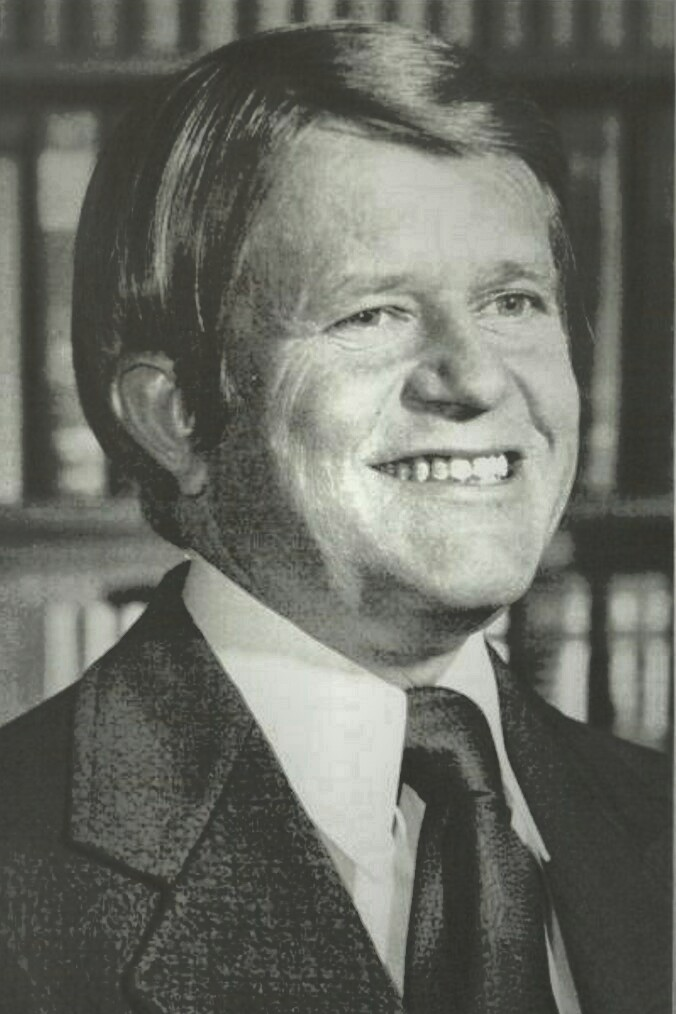

United States Senator from North Carolina
- In office January 3, 1975 – January 3, 1981
- Preceded by: Sam Ervin
- Succeeded by: John P. East

43rd Attorney General of North Carolina
- In office January 3, 1969 – August 26, 1974
- Governor: Robert W. Scott; James Holshouser
- Preceded by: T. Wade Bruton
- Succeeded by: James H. Carson, Jr.

Member of the North Carolina Senate
- In office 1955–1969
- Preceded by: J. Benton Thomas
- Succeeded by: William W. Staton

Personal details
- Born: Robert Burren Morgan; October 5, 1925 Lillington, North Carolina, U.S.
- Died: July 16, 2016 (aged 90) Buies Creek, North Carolina, U.S.
- Party: Democratic
- Spouse: Katie Earle Owen (m. 1960)
- Children: 2

Military service
- Allegiance: United States
- Branch/service: United States Navy
- Years of service: 1944–1946; 1952–1955 (Active); 1955–1971 (Reserves)
- Battles/wars: World War II; Korean War

Robert Burren Morgan (October 5, 1925 – July 16, 2016) was an American politician. A member of the Democratic Party, Morgan served as United States Senator for North Carolina from 1975 to 1981, for a single term.

== Life and career ==
Born in Lillington, North Carolina, Morgan attended Lillington public schools and later East Carolina College and Wake Forest University School of Law.

Morgan's political career began early when political leaders in his home county of Harnett County, including highly respected Democratic stalwart Veneble Baggett, visited him at the Wake Forest Law School and urged him to run for Clerk of Court. Morgan did so and was elected. After building a reputation in that office, he went into the private practice of law. His skill as a trial lawyer caused his practice to grow, and he soon established a reputation that extended across the state. Personal injury, real property and antitrust law were among his specialties.

He next ran for the North Carolina State Senate and won. He rose to the Senate's highest office, President Pro Tempore, and chaired key committees.

In 1968, Morgan challenged long-time incumbent Attorney General Wade Bruton in the Democratic Party primary, defeated him, and then won the general election. He served one four-year term and then was re-elected. Under Morgan, the office was split into five divisions each responsible to a deputy attorney general, with a sixth division later added. He served two years of that term and then resigned to run for the U.S. Senate.

Early in his political career, Morgan was considered a supporter of segregation because of his allegiance to his former Wake Forest law professor, politician I. Beverly Lake Sr., who ran an unsuccessful pro-segregation campaign for governor in 1960 against the progressive supporter of civil rights, Terry Sanford. But later, as an influential state senator, as North Carolina attorney general from 1969 to 1974, and as the successful candidate to succeed Democratic U.S. Senator Sam Ervin, Morgan was considered a moderate.

After winning the Democratic primary for U.S. Senate in 1974, Morgan resigned as attorney general effective August 26. He then won the general election over Republican William Stevens, garnering 63% of the vote.

Morgan was defeated for re-election in 1980 by Republican John P. East in an extremely close race. Morgan returned to the practice of law and also served as director of North Carolina's State Bureau of Investigation under Attorney General Lacy Thornburg.

From 2000 to 2003, Morgan served as founding president of the North Carolina Center for Voter Education, a Raleigh, North Carolina based nonprofit and nonpartisan organization that seeks to increase civic engagement in North Carolina. Morgan was president emeritus of that organization.

Morgan died at the age of 90 at his home in Buies Creek, North Carolina on July 16, 2016.

== Works cited ==
- Bell, Harold Leonard (1972). The Office of State Attorney General in the South (PhD thesis). University of Illinois at Urbana-Champaign. OCLC 77774350.

Party political offices
Preceded by T. Wade Bruton	Democratic nominee for Attorney General of North Carolina; 1968, 1972	Succeeded by Rufus Edmisten
Preceded by Sam Ervin	Democratic nominee for U.S. Senator from North Carolina (Class 3); 1974, 1980	Succeeded by Terry Sanford
Legal offices
Preceded by T. Wade Bruton	North Carolina Attorney General; 1969–1974	Succeeded by James H. Carson, Jr.
U.S. Senate
Preceded by Sam Ervin	U.S. senator (Class 3) from North Carolina; 1975–1981; Served alongside: Jesse Helms	Succeeded by John P. East
