= Nick Galifianakis (cartoonist) =

American cartoonist

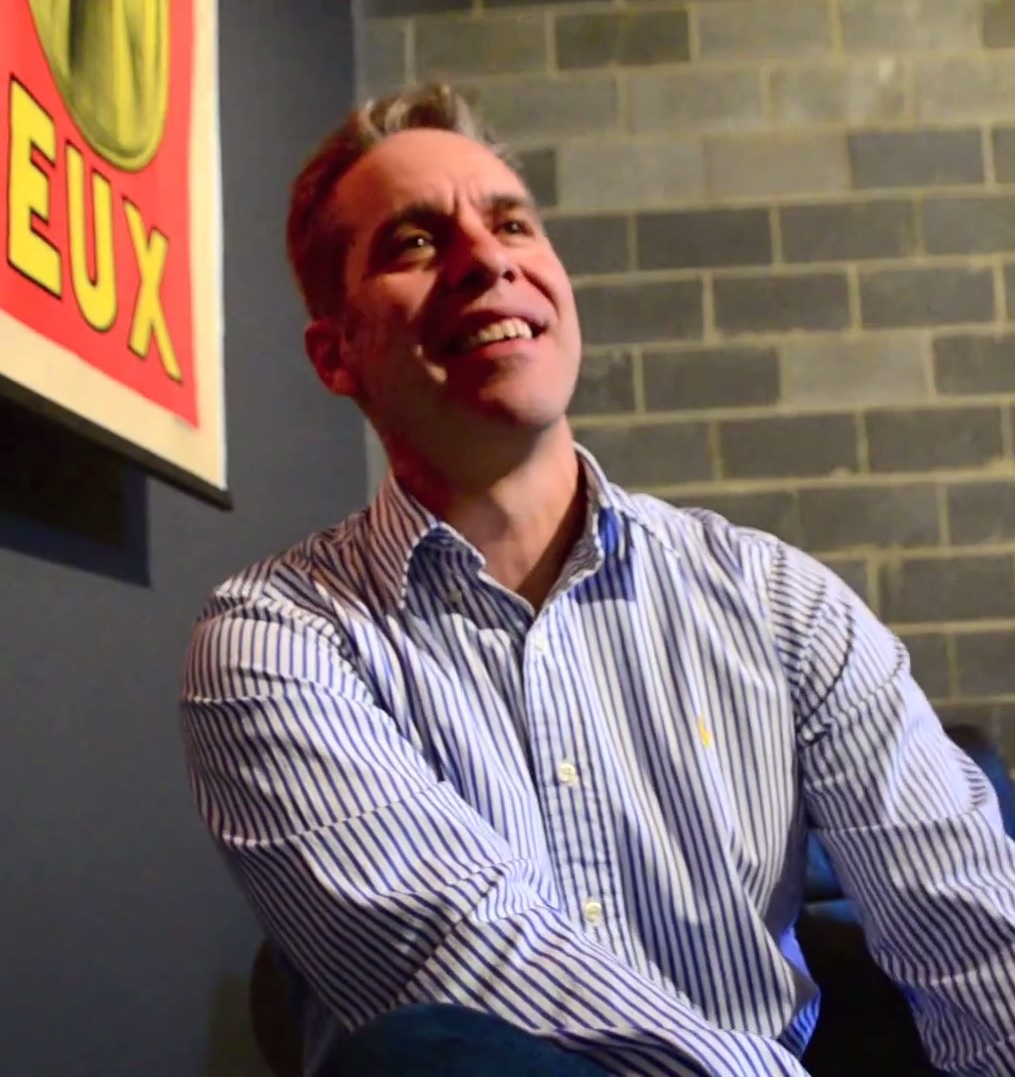
- Nick Galifianakis in 2014
- Born: Durham, North Carolina, U.S.
- Occupations: Cartoonist, artist
- Spouses: Carolyn Hax (m. 1994; div. 2002) Argyro Papafilippaki (m. 2022)
- Children: 1
- Relatives: Nick Galifianakis (uncle); Zach Galifianakis (cousin)

Nicholas Emmanuel Galifianakis Jr. (/ˌɡælɪfəˈnækɪs/) is an American cartoonist and artist. Since 1997, he has drawn the cartoons for the nationally syndicated advice column Carolyn Hax, formerly, Tell Me About It – authored by his ex-wife, writer and columnist for The Washington Post Carolyn Hax.

Galifianakis illustrated the book Tell Me About It: Lying, Sulking, Getting Fat ... and 56 Other Things NOT to Do While Looking for Love, authored by Hax in 2001. He has illustrated a number of books by writer and novelist Andrew Postman – and was nominated by the National Cartoonists Society for the 2006 Reuben Award for Outstanding Cartoonist of the Year in the Newspaper Illustration category. In 2010, Nick's first book of his cartoons was published: If You Loved Me, You'd Think This Was Cute: Uncomfortably True Cartoons About You. In 2012 Galifianakis won the Reuben Award for Advertising Illustration. In 2014 he co-authored The Art of Richard Thompson with David Apatoff and Bill Watterson In May, 2017 – while also serving as the host of the 71st annual National Cartoonists Society Reuben Awards – Nick was awarded a Reuben in the category of Newspaper Panel Cartoon for his work on "Nick & Zuzu."

== Biography ==
Born in Durham, North Carolina, Galifianakis grew up in Falls Church, Virginia, and attended the University of North Carolina at Chapel Hill and American University in Washington, D.C.

His career as a cartoonist followed earlier work as a cartoonist and illustrator for USA Today and U.S. News & World Report, and as a freelance cartoonist and illustrator with published illustrations in a variety of nationally distributed periodicals.

Galifianakis is a first cousin of comedian Zach Galifianakis and nephew of former U.S. Representative Nick Galifianakis. He and Hax married in 1994. Divorced in 2002, they continue to collaborate on the column. He has remarried and has a daughter, Katerina. Zach Galifianakis is Katerina's godfather.

== Zuzu ==
Galifianakis's earlier work prominently featured his pit bull, Zuzu, who died in August 2010. Zuzu was named after a character in the film It's A Wonderful Life, the daughter of George Bailey – who gave him flower petals to carry in his pocket.

In early 2011, Galifianakis said in an NPR interview, "the reason the Zuzu cartoons are funny, or any cartoons that anthropomorphize an animal like that, that place it in a human dynamic, is that relationships with animals are generally good."

In an August 2010 The Washington Post tribute to Zuzu, Galifianakis wrote: "she died a week short of 13, rendering me more human than I had ever cared to be."
