= 1980 United States Senate election in North Carolina =

- November 4, 1980
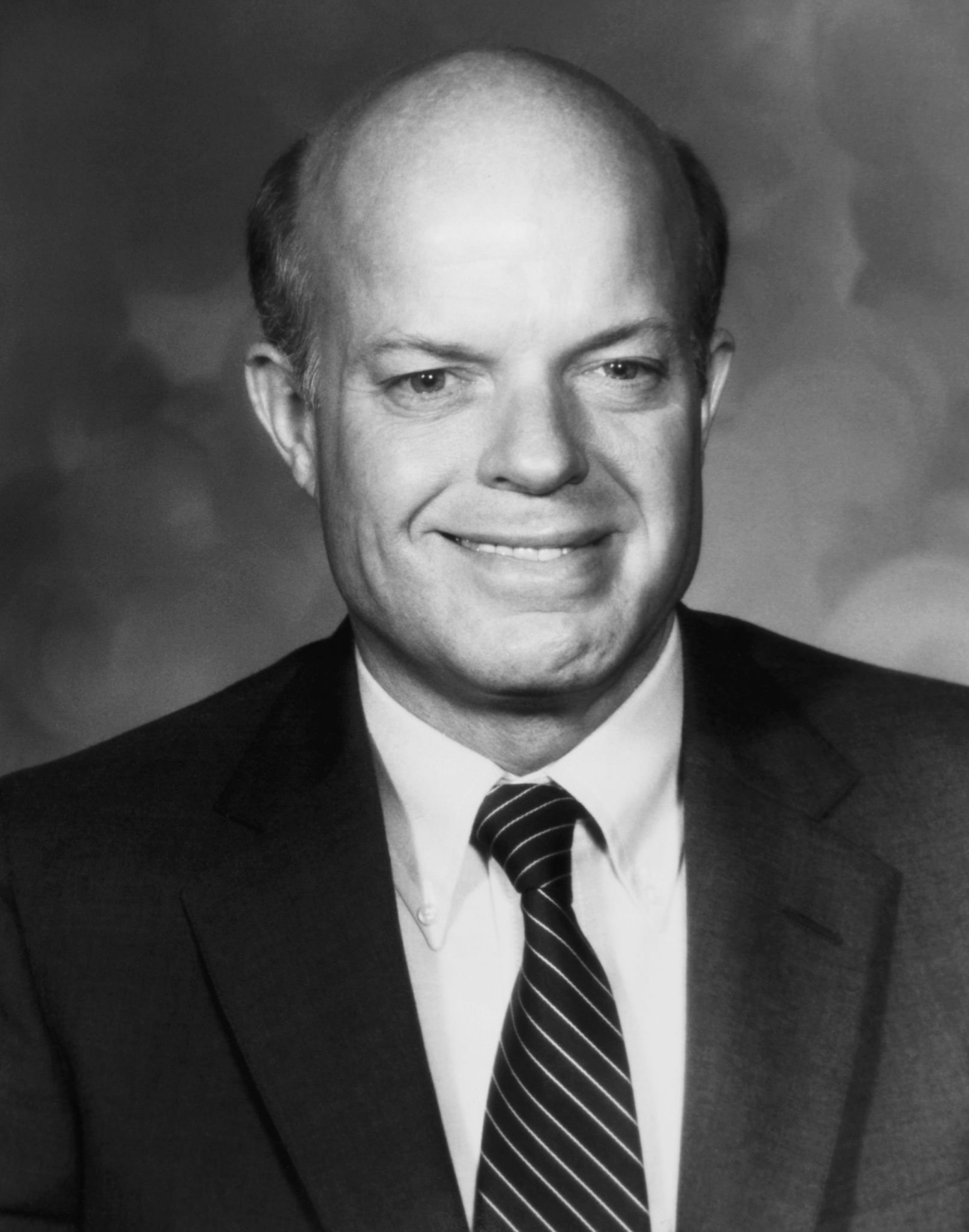

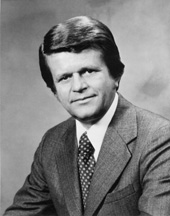
Nominee	John P. East	Robert B. Morgan
Party	Republican	Democratic
Popular vote	898,064	887,653
Percentage	49.96%	49.38%
- East: 40–50% 50–60% 60–70% Morgan: 50–60% 60–70% 70–80% 80–90%
U.S. senator before election
Robert Morgan
Democratic
Elected U.S. Senator
John East
Republican

The 1980 United States Senate election in North Carolina was held on November 4, 1980, as part of the nationwide elections to the Senate. Incumbent Democratic U.S. Senator Robert B. Morgan ran for reelection to a second term, but narrowly lost to Republican challenger John P. East.

This was the first time Republicans had won this seat since 1897, and the inauguration of John East marked the first time since Reconstruction that they held both Senate seats simultaneously. East won every western congressional district while losing every eastern one.

== Primaries ==
=== Democratic ===
Robert Morgan was unopposed for the Democratic nomination.

=== Republican ===
John East was unopposed for the Republican nomination.

== General election ==
=== Candidates ===
- John East (R), professor at East Carolina University
- Robert Morgan (D), incumbent U.S. senator

=== Results ===
1980 North Carolina U.S. Senate election
Party	Candidate	Votes	%	±%
Republican	John East	898,064	49.96%	+12.18%
Democratic	Robert Morgan (incumbent)	887,653	49.38%	−12.39%
Libertarian	F.W. (Rick) Pasotto	7,602	0.04%	N/A
Socialist Workers	Rebecca Finch	4,346	0.02%	N/A
Total votes		1,797,655	100.00%	N/A
Republican gain from Democratic				

== See also ==
- 1980 United States Senate elections
