= John P. East =

American politician

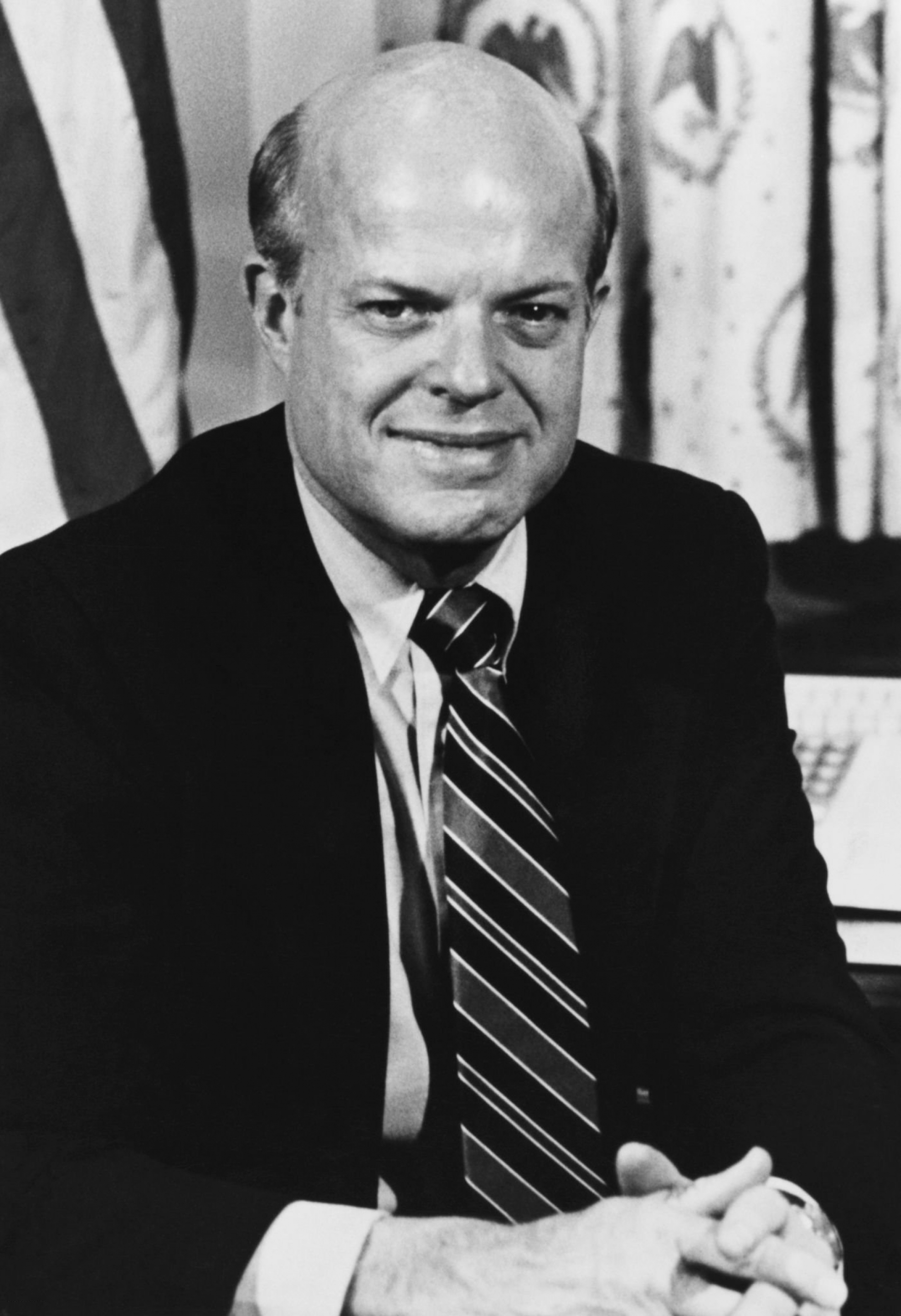
- East in 1983

United States Senator from North Carolina
- In office January 3, 1981 – June 29, 1986
- Preceded by: Robert B. Morgan
- Succeeded by: Jim Broyhill

Personal details
- Born: John Porter East; May 5, 1931 Springfield, Illinois, U.S.
- Died: June 29, 1986 (aged 55) Greenville, North Carolina, U.S.
- Party: Republican
- Spouse: Priscilla Sherk East (m. 1953)
- Education: Earlham College (BA); University of Florida (MA, PhD); University of Illinois at Urbana-Champaign (LLB)

Military service
- Allegiance: United States
- Branch/service: United States Marine Corps
- Years of service: 1953–1955

John Porter East (May 5, 1931 – June 29, 1986) was an American politician, attorney, and academic. A member of the Republican Party, he served as a U.S. senator from North Carolina from 1981 to 1986.

Born in Springfield, Illinois, East served in the United States Marine Corps after graduating from Earlham College and was discharged in 1955 after being infected with polio and becoming paraplegic. East then completed a law degree at the University of Illinois College of Law and Ph.D. in political science at the University of Florida. From 1964 to 1980, East was a professor of political science at East Carolina University.

In 1980, East ran for U.S. Senate to challenge incumbent Democratic Senator Robert B. Morgan and won a close election, in an election year favoring Republicans nationally. As senator, East supported conservative policies and cosponsored the Firearm Owners Protection Act. He also served on the Judiciary Subcommittee on Security and Terrorism. Having already declined to run for re-election and believing that his doctor missed a hypothyroidism diagnosis, East committed suicide in 1986.

== Early life and education ==
John Porter East was born in Springfield, Illinois, on May 5, 1931, the son of an employee of the State of Illinois. He received his Bachelor of Arts degree from Earlham College in Indiana where he was left tackle on the football team. After his graduation in 1953, he married Priscilla Sherk and was commissioned as an officer in the United States Marine Corps. In 1955, East contracted polio while serving at Camp Lejeune. He would never walk again. He received a LL.B. degree from the University of Illinois College of Law and practiced law in Naples, Florida, for one year. He went on to receive his M.A. and Ph.D. in political science from the University of Florida.

== Political career ==
East was a protégé of conservative Senator Jesse Helms. In 1966, East ran unsuccessfully for a vacancy in the United States House of Representatives in a special election, a race won by Walter B. Jones Sr.

In 1980, East narrowly defeated incumbent Democratic Senator Robert B. Morgan. During the campaign, East attacked Morgan for voting to ratify the Panama Canal Treaties, among other accusations of being weak on defense policy.

In the Senate, he earned a reputation as a staunch social conservative, especially on the issue of abortion. Alongside Jesse Helms, East led opposition to the bill to create a federal holiday to honor Martin Luther King Jr. in 1983. In Congress, East cosponsored over 100 bills that were signed into law by President Ronald Reagan, including the Firearm Owners Protection Act.

East was also a national security hawk, and was a member of the Judiciary Subcommittee on Security and Terrorism along with Orrin Hatch and Jeremiah Denton. The committee is notable for its accusations of Soviet infiltration of left-wing think tanks, publications and activist groups such as the Institute for Policy Studies and the magazine Mother Jones. East's primary national security staffer on the committee, Samuel T. Francis, later a prominent columnist for The Washington Times, has been cited as an intellectual fore-bearer of the alt-right movement.

In 1986, East announced that he would not seek re-election, and would instead return to his teaching position.

== Death ==
On Friday, June 27, 1986, East completed work on the book galleys of his collected essays. He met with Supreme Court nominee Antonin Scalia. Then, commitments met, East drove to Greenville with his aide, John Petree, and arrived home about noon on Saturday. Petree stayed with him until his daughter Kathryn arrived for a visit. Kathryn left her father "in good spirits" about midnight. Petree returned to East's house on Sunday morning, June 29. He found the front door ajar. The senator was dead in his garage, a victim of suicide by carbon monoxide poisoning. He left a note that blamed his doctor for failing to diagnose hypothyroidism, which he believed had robbed him of his intellectual abilities. North Carolina Governor James G. Martin appointed United States House of Representatives member Jim Broyhill to serve out the rest of East's term.

East is buried in Arlington National Cemetery.

== See also ==
- List of members of the United States Congress who died in office (1950–1999)

Party political offices
Preceded by Edwin E. Butler	Republican nominee for North Carolina Secretary of State; 1968	Succeeded by Grace Rohrer
Preceded by William Stevens	Republican nominee for U.S. Senator from North Carolina (Class 3); 1980	Succeeded by Jim Broyhill
U.S. Senate
Preceded by Robert Burren Morgan	U.S. senator (Class 3) from North Carolina; 1981–1986; Served alongside: Jesse Helms	Succeeded by Jim Broyhill
