= 1972 United States Senate election in North Carolina =

- November 7, 1972
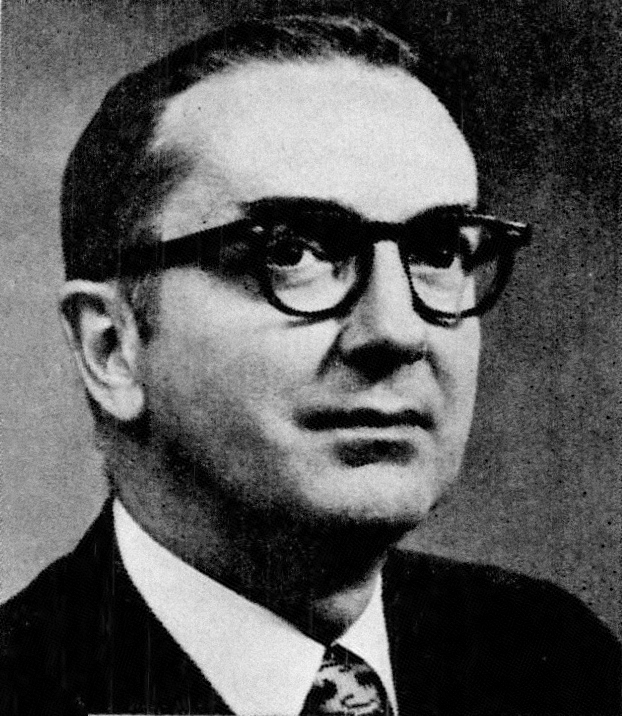

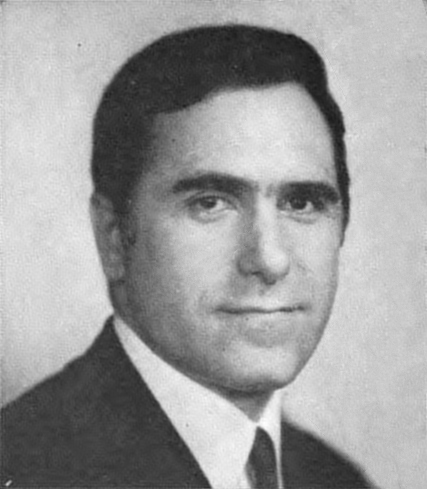
Nominee	Jesse Helms	Nick Galifianakis
Party	Republican	Democratic
Popular vote	795,247	677,293
Percentage	54.01%	45.99%
- County results Helms: 50–60% 60–70% 70–80% Galifianakis: 50–60% 60–70% 70–80%
U.S. senator before election
B. Everett Jordan
Democratic
Elected U.S. Senator
Jesse Helms
Republican

The North Carolina United States Senate election of 1972 was held on 7 November 1972 as part of the nationwide elections to the Senate, and coinciding with the 1972 presidential election. The general election was contested between the Republican nominee Jesse Helms and the Democratic nominee Rep. Nick Galifianakis. Helms won the election, becoming the first Republican to win a Senate seat in North Carolina since 1897, and the first to hold this seat since 1871.

Three-term Representative Nick Galifianakis defeated two-term incumbent Senator B. Everett Jordan in the second ballot in the Democratic primary. Galifianakis was seen as an anti-establishment liberal in North Carolina, although an opponent of busing. This was the first time ever that a Republican won a full term to this Senate seat in North Carolina.

== Democratic primary ==
=== Candidates ===
- J. R. Brown
- Nick Galifianakis, U.S. representative from Durham
- Eugene Grace
- B. Everett Jordan, incumbent senator since 1958

22% of the voting-age population participated in the Democratic primary.

=== Results ===
1972 Democratic Senate primary
Party	Candidate	Votes	%
Democratic	Nick Galifianakis	377,993	49.25%
Democratic	B. Everett Jordan (incumbent)	340,391	44.35%
Democratic	J. R. Brown	27,009	3.52%
Democratic	Eugene Grace	22,156	2.89%
Total votes		767,549	100.00%

=== Runoff ===
Galifianakis: 50–60%; 60–70%; 70–80%; Jordan: 50–60%; 60–70%; Tie: 50%

1972 Democratic Senate runoff
Party	Candidate	Votes	%	±%
Democratic	Nick Galifianakis	338,558	55.82%	▲6.57
Democratic	B. Everett Jordan (incumbent)	267,997	44.18%	▼0.17
Total votes		606,555	100.00%	

== Republican primary ==
=== Candidates ===
- William Booe, former member of the Charlotte School Board
- Jesse Helms, WRAL-TV executive and commentator and former Democratic member of the Raleigh City Council
- James Johnson, state representative from Greensboro

4.4% of the voting-age population participated in the Republican primary.

=== Results ===
1972 Republican Senate primary
Party	Candidate	Votes	%
Republican	Jesse Helms	92,496	60.13%
Republican	James Johnson	45,303	29.45%
Republican	William Booe	16,032	10.42%
Total votes		153,831	100.00%

== General election ==
=== Results ===
1972 U.S. Senate election in North Carolina
Party	Candidate	Votes	%	±%
Republican	Jesse Helms	795,247	54.01%	▲9.61
Democratic	Nick Galifianakis	677,293	45.99%	▼9.60
Total votes		1,472,540	100.00%	

== Works cited ==
- Steed, Robert; Moreland, Laurence; Baker, Tod, eds. (1980). Party Politics in the South. Praeger Publishers. ISBN 0030565863.
