= 2010 United States House of Representatives elections in North Carolina =

- November 2, 2010

All 13 North Carolina seats in the United States House of Representatives
	Majority party	Minority party
Party	Democratic	Republican
Last election	8	5
Seats won	7	6
Seat change	▼1	▲1
Popular vote	1,204,635	1,440,913
Percentage	45.25%	54.13%
Swing	▼9.18%	▲9.01%

Democratic
40–50%
50–60%
60–70%
70–80%
Republican
40–50%
50–60%
60–70%
70–80%
80–90%

Elections were held on November 2, 2010, to determine North Carolina's 13 members of the United States House of Representatives. Representatives were elected for two-year-terms to serve in the 112th United States Congress from January 3, 2011, until January 3, 2013. Primary elections were held on May 4, 2010, and primary runoff elections were held on June 22, 2010.

Of the 13 elections, the races in the 2nd, 8th and 11th districts were rated as competitive by Sabato's Crystal Ball, while the 2nd, 7th, 8th and 11th districts were rated as competitive by CQ Politics and The Rothenberg Political Report, and the 2nd, 4th, 7th, 8th and 11th districts were rated as competitive by The Cook Political Report. Of North Carolina's 13 incumbents, 12 were re-elected while one (Bob Etheridge of the 2nd district) unsuccessfully sought re-election.

In total, seven Democrats and six Republicans were elected. A total of 2,662,529 votes were cast, of which 1,440,913 (54.12 percent) were for Republican candidates, 1,204,635 (45.24 percent) were for Democratic candidates, 16,562 (0.62 percent) were for Libertarian candidates and 439 (0.02 percent) were for write-in candidates. Until 2026, this is the last time the Democrats won a majority of North Carolina's congressional districts, even though they did not win the popular vote. As a result, North Carolina became one of four states in which the party that won the state's popular vote did not win a majority of seats in 2010, the other states being Iowa, Illinois, and New Jersey.

== Overview ==
Results of the 2010 United States House of Representatives elections in North Carolina by district:

District	Republican		Democratic		Others		Total		Result
District	Votes	%	Votes	%	Votes	%	Votes	%	Result
District 1	70,867	40.69%	103,294	59.31%	0	0.00%	174,161	100.00%	Democratic hold
District 2	93,876	49.47%	92,393	48.68%	3,505	1.85%	189,774	100.00%	Republican gain
District 3	143,225	71.86%	51,317	25.75%	4,762	2.39%	199,304	100.00%	Republican hold
District 4	116,448	42.84%	155,384	57.16%	0	0.00%	271,832	100.00%	Democratic hold
District 5	140,525	65.89%	72,762	34.11%	0	0.00%	213,287	100.00%	Republican hold
District 6	156,252	75.21%	51,507	24.79%	0	0.00%	207,759	100.00%	Republican hold
District 7	98,328	46.32%	113,957	53.68%	0	0.00%	212,285	100.00%	Democratic hold
District 8	73,129	43.67%	88,776	53.02%	5,537	3.31%	167,442	100.00%	Democratic hold
District 9	158,790	68.97%	71,450	31.03%	0	0.00%	230,240	100.00%	Republican hold
District 10	130,813	71.18%	52,972	28.82%	0	0.00%	183,785	100.00%	Republican hold
District 11	110,246	45.66%	131,225	54.34%	0	0.00%	241,471	100.00%	Democratic hold
District 12	55,315	34.14%	103,495	63.88%	3,197	1.97%	162,007	100.00%	Democratic hold
District 13	93,099	44.50%	116,103	55.50%	0	0.00%	209,202	100.00%	Democratic hold
Total	1,440,913	54.12%	1,204,635	45.24%	17,001	0.64%	2,662,549	100.00%	

== District 1 ==
2010 North Carolina's 1st congressional district election
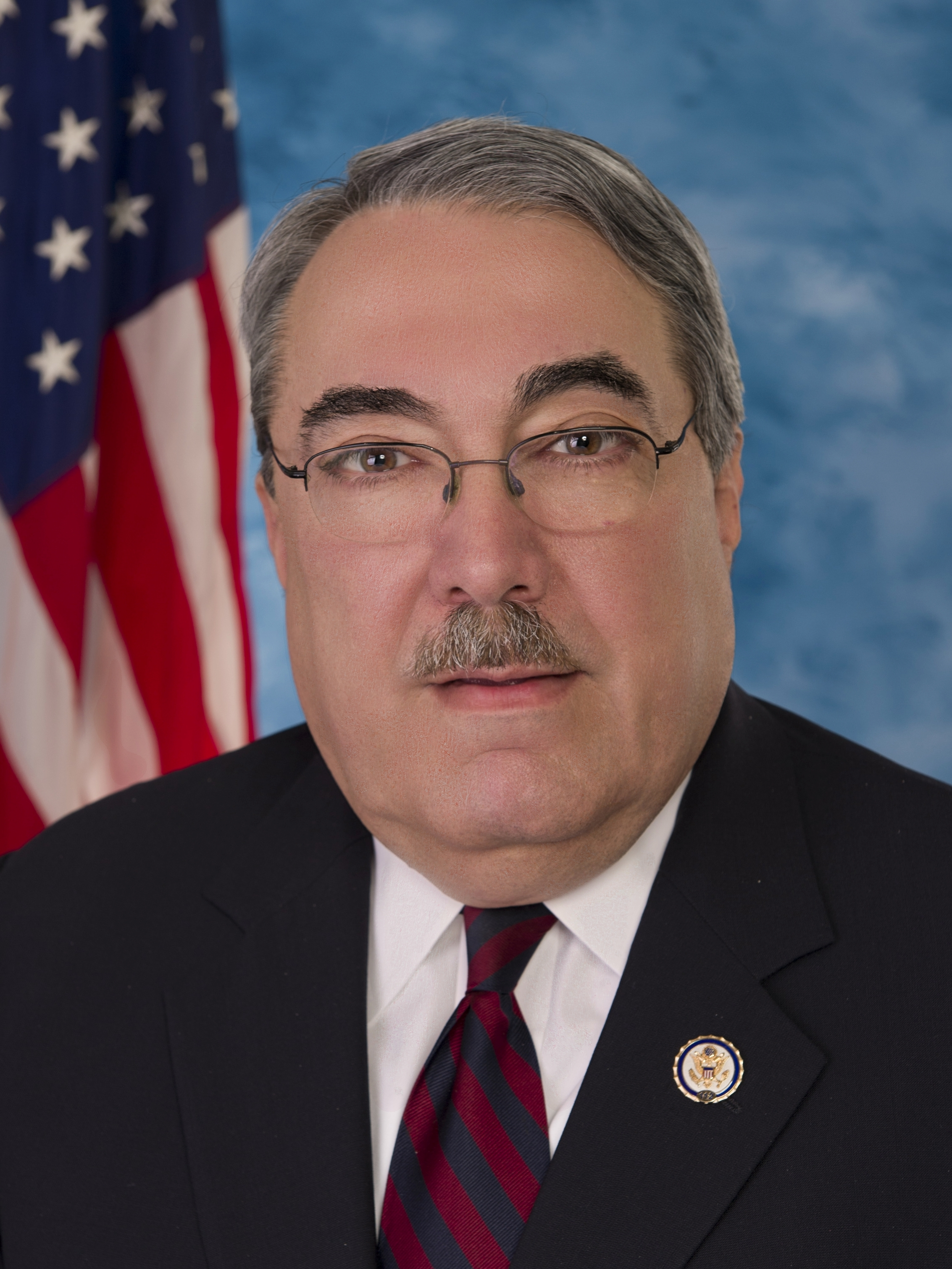

Nominee	G. K. Butterfield	Ashley Woolard
Party	Democratic	Republican
Popular vote	103,294	70,867
Percentage	59.3%	40.7%
U.S. Representative before election
G. K. Butterfield
Democratic
Elected U.S. Representative
G. K. Butterfield
Democratic

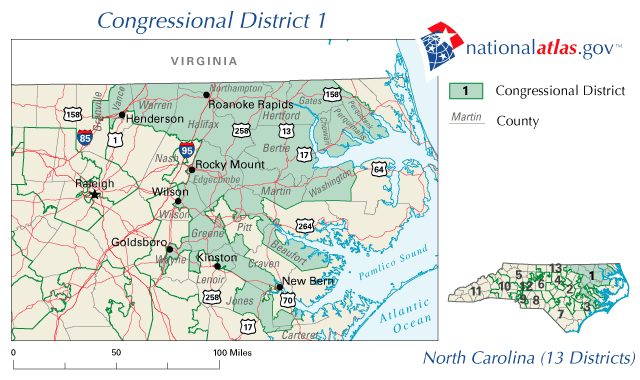
North Carolina's 1st congressional district in 2010

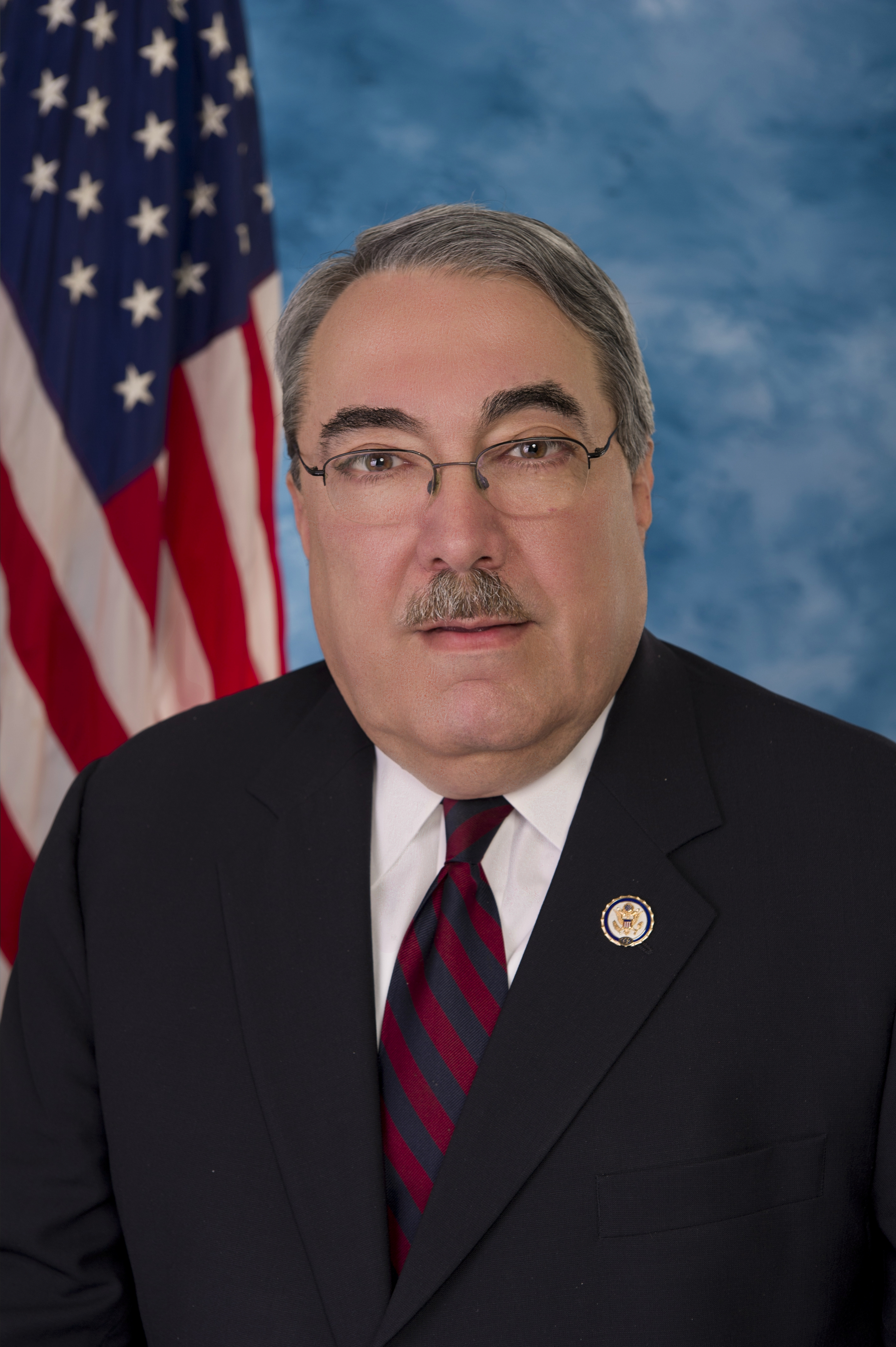
G. K. Butterfield, who was re-elected as the U.S. representative for the 1st district

The 1st district included parts of Goldsboro, Greenville, Rocky Mount and Wilson. The district's population was 50 percent black and 44 percent white (see race and ethnicity in the United States census); 76 percent were high school graduates and 13 percent had received a bachelor's degree or higher. Its median income was $32,216. In the 2008 presidential election the district gave 63 percent of its vote to Democratic nominee Barack Obama and 37 percent to Republican nominee John McCain.

Democrat G. K. Butterfield, who took office in 2004, was the incumbent. Butterfield was re-elected in 2008 with 70 percent of the vote. In 2010 Butterfield's opponent in the general election was Republican nominee Ashley Woolard, an insurance executive. Chad Larkins, a contractor, also sought the Democratic nomination. John Carter, a U.S. Air Force veteran; Jerry Grimes, an assistant pastor and ethics instructor; and James Gordon Miller also sought the Republican nomination.

Butterfield raised $828,117 and spent $794,383. Woolard raised $133,394 and spent $133,387. Larkins raised $450 and spent no money. Grimes raised $11,747 and spent $10,752.

Prior to the election FiveThirtyEight's forecast gave Butterfield a 100 percent chance of winning and projected that he would receive 63 percent of the vote to Woolard's 35 percent. On election day Butterfield was re-elected with 59 percent of the vote to Woolard's 41 percent. Butterfield was again re-elected in 2012 and 2014.

=== Democratic primary results ===
North Carolina's 1st district Democratic primary, May 4, 2010
Party	Candidate	Votes	%
Democratic	G. K. Butterfield (incumbent)	46,509	72.93
Democratic	Chad Larkins	17,262	27.07
Total votes		63,771	100.00

=== Republican primary results ===
North Carolina's 1st district Republican primary, May 4, 2010
Party	Candidate	Votes	%
Republican	Ashley Woolard	3,774	45.24
Republican	Jerry Grimes	2,220	26.61
Republican	James Gordon Miller	1,252	15.01
Republican	John Carter	1,097	13.15
Total votes		8,343	100.00

==== Predictions ====
Source	Ranking	As of
The Cook Political Report	Safe D	November 1, 2010
Rothenberg	Safe D	November 1, 2010
Sabato's Crystal Ball	Safe D	November 1, 2010
RCP	Safe D	November 1, 2010
CQ Politics	Safe D	October 28, 2010
New York Times	Safe D	November 1, 2010
FiveThirtyEight	Safe D	November 1, 2010

=== General election results ===
North Carolina's 1st district general election, November 2, 2010
Party	Candidate	Votes	%
Democratic	G. K. Butterfield (incumbent)	103,294	59.31
Republican	Ashley Woolard	70,867	40.69
Total votes		174,161	100.00

== District 2 ==
2010 North Carolina's 2nd congressional district election
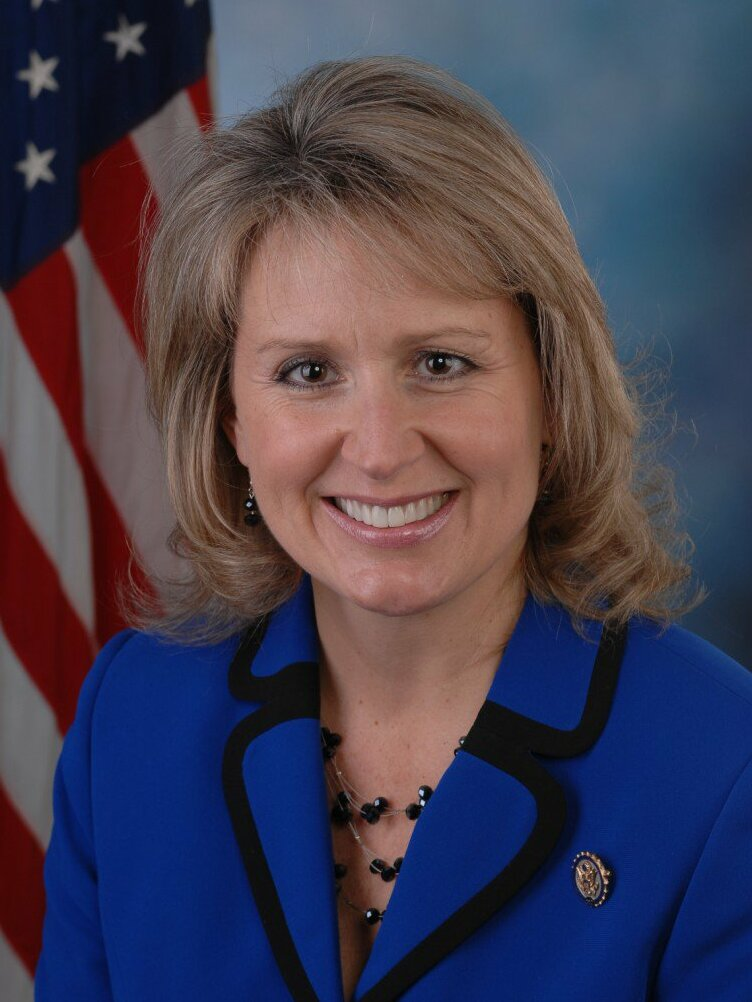

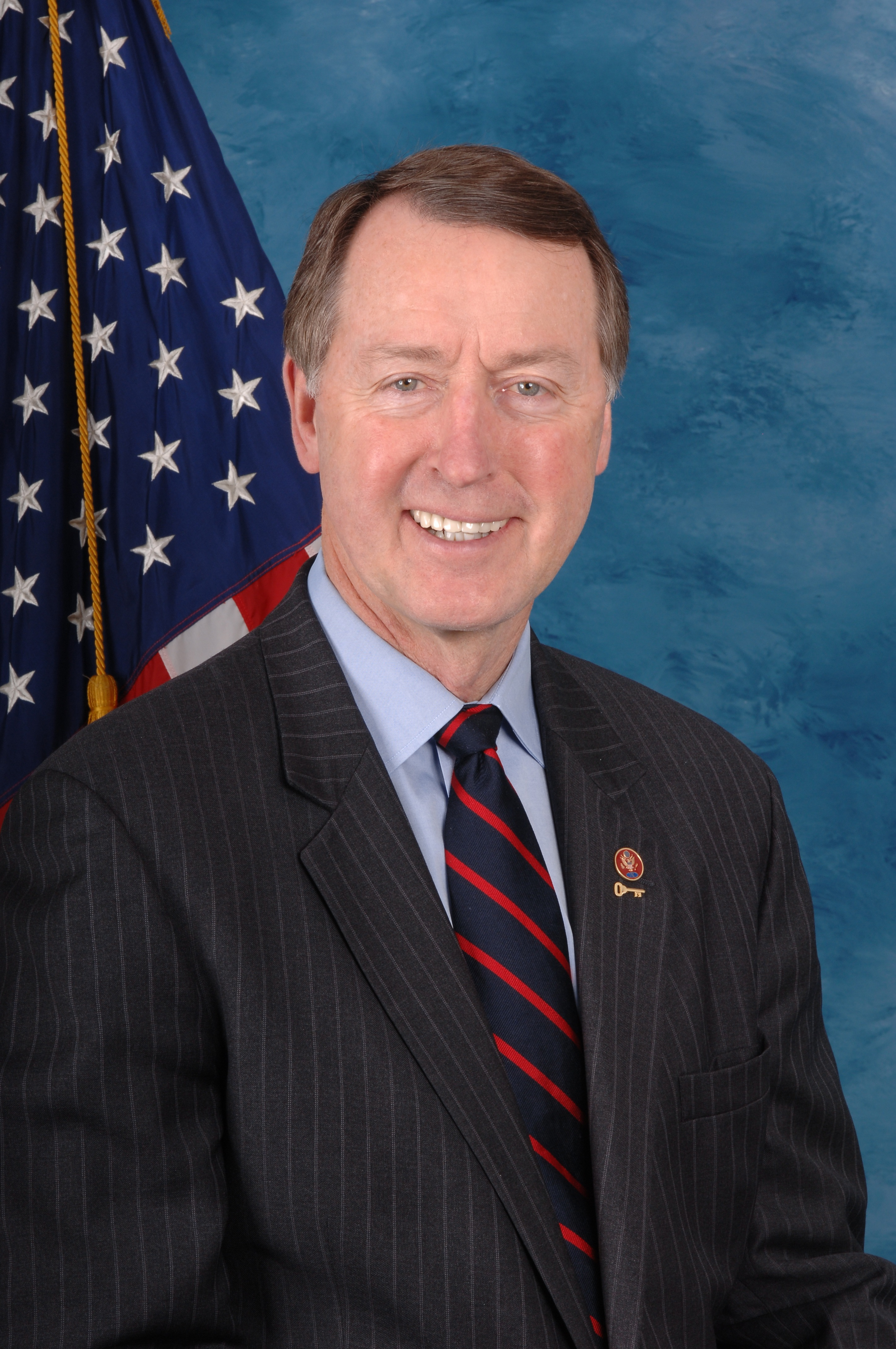
Nominee	Renee Ellmers	Bob Etheridge
Party	Republican	Democratic
Popular vote	93,876	92,393
Percentage	49.5%	48.7%
U.S. Representative before election
Bob Etheridge
Democratic
Elected U.S. Representative
Renee Ellmers
Republican

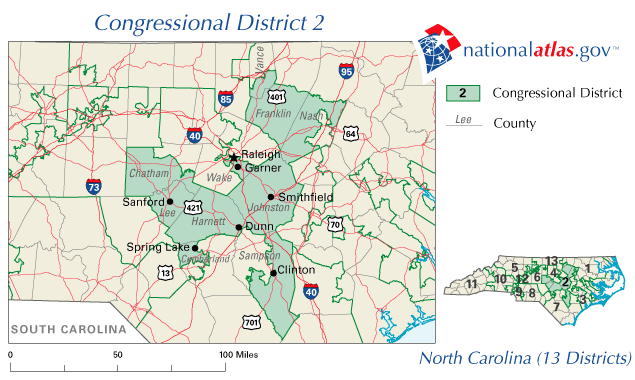
North Carolina's 2nd congressional district in 2010

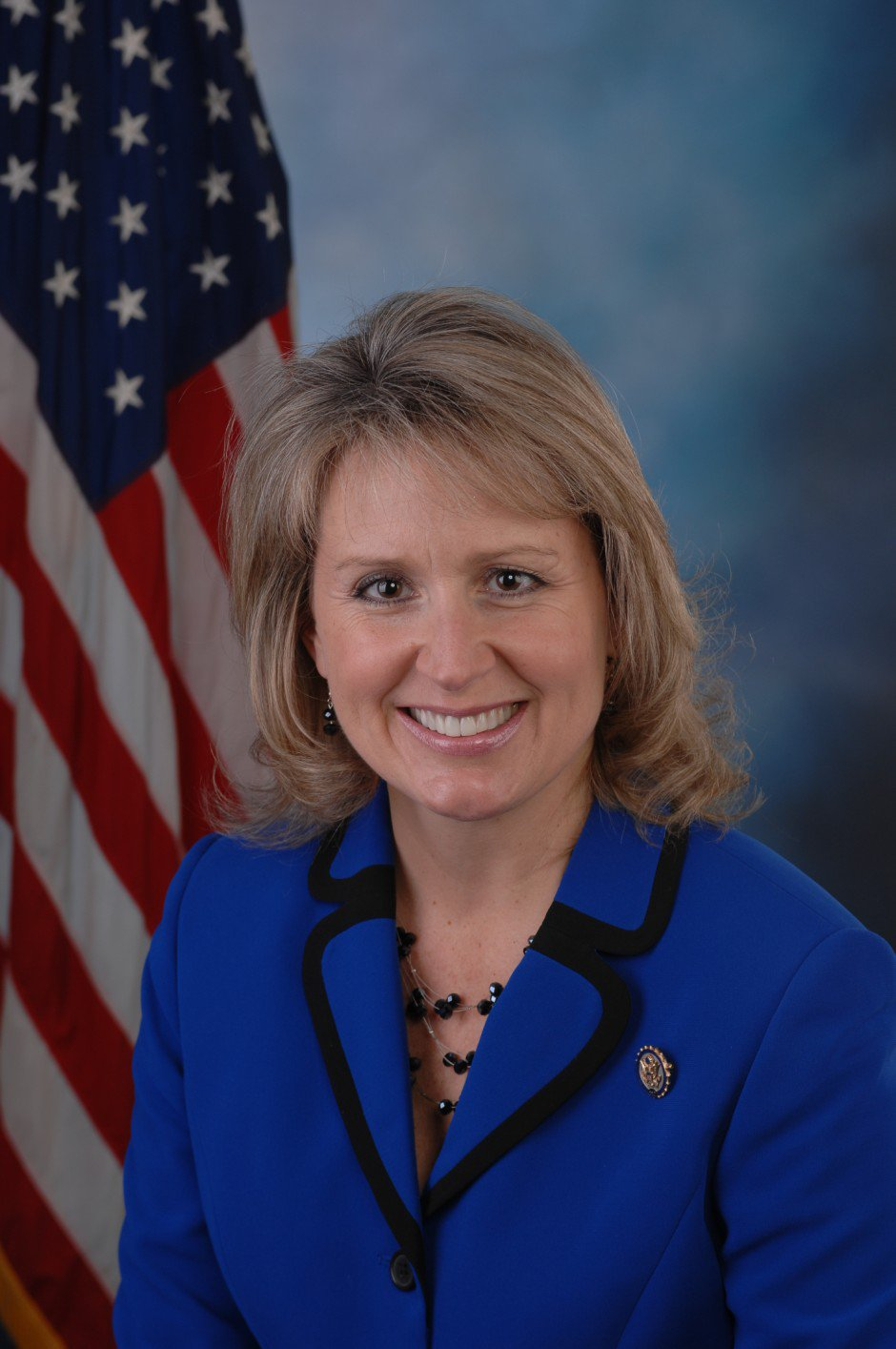
Renee Ellmers, who was elected as the U.S. representative for the 2nd district

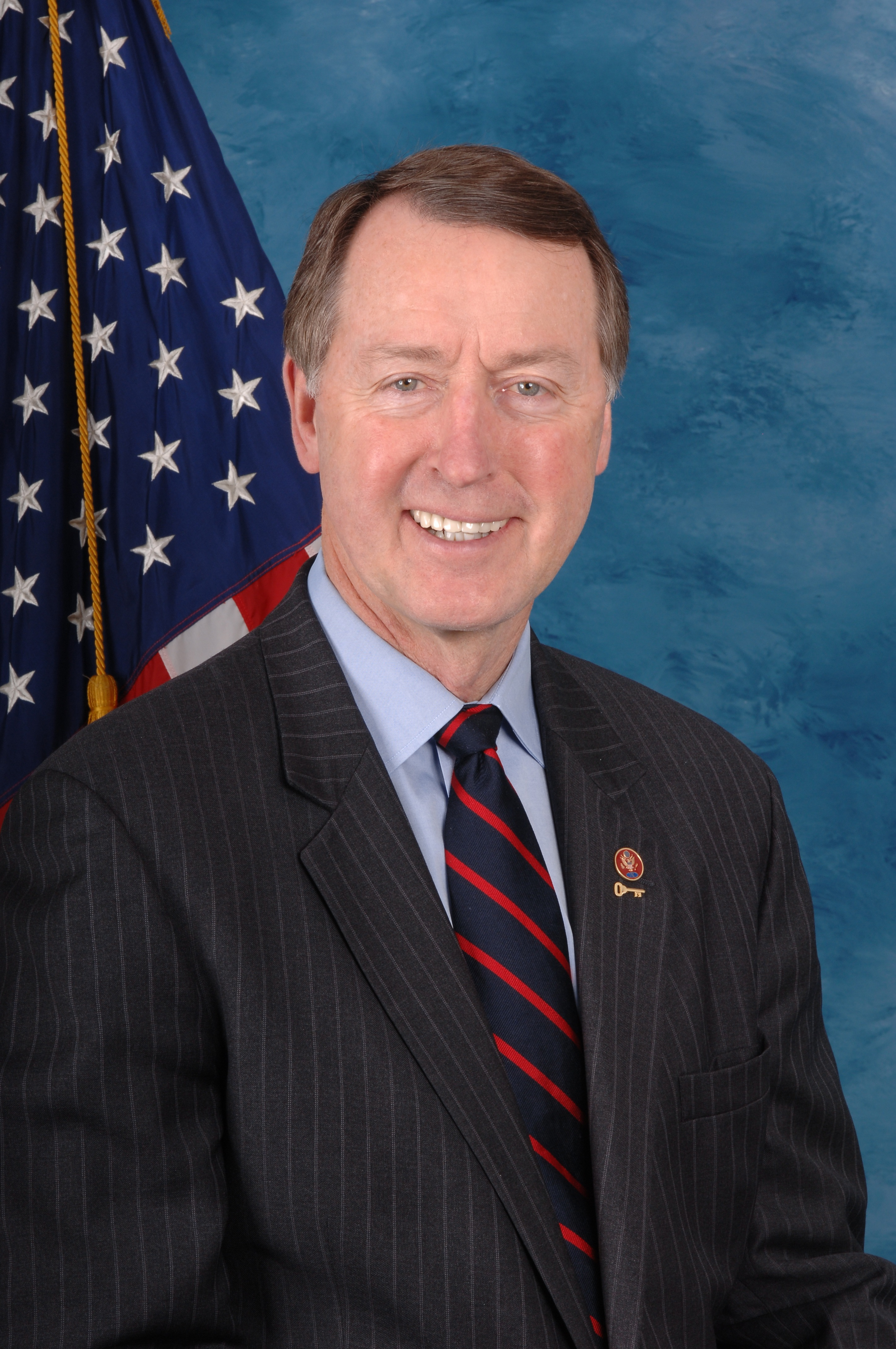
Bob Etheridge, who unsuccessfully sought re-election in the 2nd district

The 2nd district included Sanford and parts of Fayetteville and Raleigh. The district's population was 58 percent white, 29 percent black and 11 percent Hispanic (see race and ethnicity in the United States census); 80 percent were high school graduates and 18 percent had received a bachelor's degree or higher. Its median income was $42,945. In the 2008 presidential election the district gave 52 percent of its vote to Democratic nominee Barack Obama and 47 percent to Republican nominee John McCain.

Democrat Bob Etheridge, who took office in 1997, was the incumbent. Etheridge was re-elected in 2008 with 67 percent of the vote. In 2010 Etheridge's opponent in the general election was Republican nominee Renee Ellmers, a nurse. Libertarian Party nominee Tom Rose also ran. Etheridge was unopposed in the Democratic primary. Frank Deatrich, a retired businessman; and Todd Gailas, an auto dealer, also sought the Republican nomination.

In June 2010 Etheridge was involved in an incident in which he grabbed a camera belonging to a pair of self-described students, one of whose wrists he then grabbed, before placing the student in a hug. One of the students had asked whether Etheridge supported "the Obama agenda", to which Etheridge replied "who are you?" The incident went viral on the internet and cable television, and led to a spike in financial contributions to Ellmers's campaign. Etheridge later issued an apology for grabbing the young man.

Etheridge raised $1,414,630 and spent $1,904,688. Ellmers raised $1,118,736 and spent $886,608. Gailas raised $2,140 and spent $959.

In a poll of 400 registered voters, conducted by SurveyUSA (SUSA) for the Civitas Institute (CI) in June 2010, Ellmers led with 39 percent to Etheridge's 38 percent, while 12 percent supported Rose and 11 percent were undecided. A poll of 400 registered voters, conducted by SUSA for CI in October 2010, found Ellmers leading with 46 percent to Etheridge's 41 percent while Rose had the support of 6 percent and 7 percent were undecided. Prior to the election FiveThirtyEight's forecast gave Ellmers a 55 percent chance of winning and projected that she would receive 47 percent of the vote to Etheridge's 46 percent, while Rose would receive 6 percent.

On election day Ellmers was elected with 50 percent of the vote to Etheridge's 49 percent, while Rose received 2 percent. On November 4, 2010, Etheridge had yet to concede despite the Associated Press declaring Ellmers the winner. On November 12 Etheridge confirmed he would seek a recount, after which he conceded on November 19. Ellmers was again re-elected in 2012 and 2014. Etheridge unsuccessfully ran for Governor of North Carolina in 2012. In 2013 Etheridge was appointed to lead North Carolina's Farm Service Agency.

=== Republican primary results ===
North Carolina's 2nd district Republican primary, May 4, 2010
Party	Candidate	Votes	%
Republican	Renee Ellmers	9,171	55.11
Republican	Frank Deatrich	4,280	25.72
Republican	Todd Gailas	3,190	19.17
Total votes		16,641	100.00

==== Predictions ====
Source	Ranking	As of
The Cook Political Report	Lean D	November 1, 2010
Rothenberg	Tilt D	November 1, 2010
Sabato's Crystal Ball	Likely D	November 1, 2010
RCP	Tossup	November 1, 2010
CQ Politics	Likely D	October 28, 2010
New York Times	Lean D	November 1, 2010
FiveThirtyEight	Tossup	November 1, 2010

=== General election results ===
North Carolina's 2nd district general election, November 2, 2010
Party	Candidate	Votes	%
Republican	Renee Ellmers	93,876	49.47
Democratic	Bob Etheridge (incumbent)	92,393	48.69
Libertarian	Tom Rose	3,505	1.85
Total votes		189,774	100.00

== District 3 ==
2010 North Carolina's 3rd congressional district election
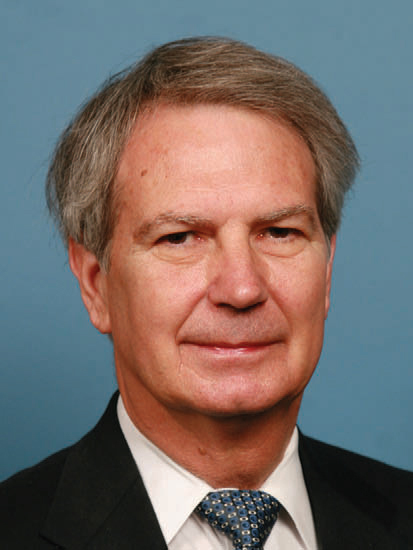

Nominee	Walter B. Jones Jr.	Johnny Rouse
Party	Republican	Democratic
Popular vote	143,225	51,317
Percentage	71.9%	25.8%
U.S. Representative before election
Walter B. Jones Jr.
Republican
Elected U.S. Representative
Walter B. Jones Jr.
Republican

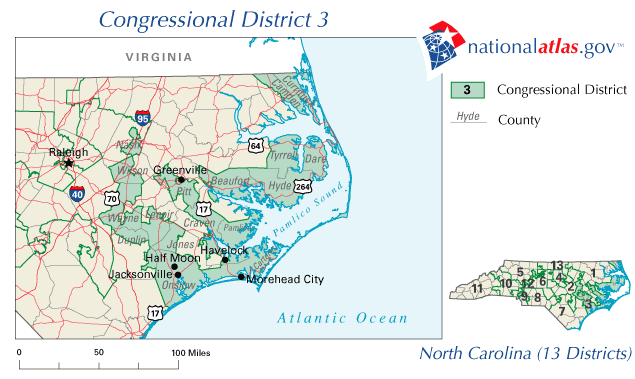
North Carolina's 3rd congressional district in 2010

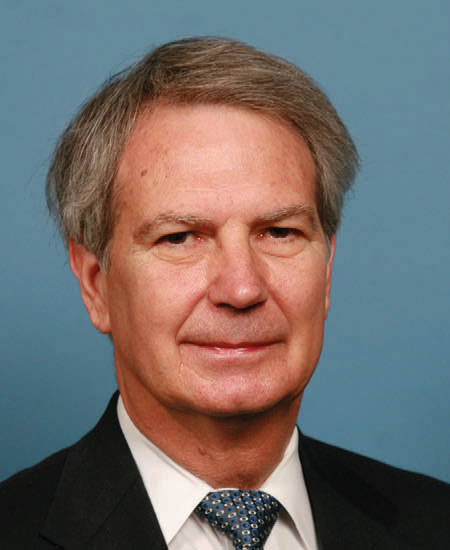
Walter B. Jones Jr., who was re-elected as the U.S. representative for the 3rd district

The 3rd district included Jacksonville and parts of Greenville and Wilson. The district's population was 75 percent white, 17 percent black and 6 percent Hispanic (see race and ethnicity in the United States census); 86 percent were high school graduates and 23 percent had received a bachelor's degree or higher. Its median income was $46,958. In the 2008 presidential election the district gave 61 percent of its vote to Republican nominee John McCain and 38 percent to Democratic nominee Barack Obama.

Republican Walter B. Jones Jr., who took office in 1995, was the incumbent. Jones was re-elected in 2008 with 66 percent of the vote. In 2010 Jones's opponent in the general election was Democratic nominee Johnny Rouse, an employee of The Brody School of Medicine at East Carolina University. Libertarian Party nominee Darryl Holloman, a software developer, also ran. Robert Cavanaugh and Craig Weber, the latter of whom challenged Jones as a Democrat in 2006 and 2008, also sought the Republican nomination. Rouse was unopposed for the Democratic nomination.

Jones raised $672,357 and spent $577,215. Rouse raised $10,588 and spent $11,071. Holloman raised $355 and spent $238. Weber raised $2,181 and spent the same amount.

Prior to the election FiveThirtyEight's forecast gave Jones a 100 percent chance of winning and projected that he would receive 70 percent of the vote to Rouse's 28 percent. On election day Jones was re-elected with 72 percent of the vote to Rouse's 26 percent. Jones was again re-elected in 2012 and 2014.

=== Republican primary results ===
North Carolina's 3rd district Republican primary, May 4, 2010
Party	Candidate	Votes	%
Republican	Walter B. Jones Jr. (incumbent)	21,551	76.88
Republican	Bob Cavanaugh	4,221	15.06
Republican	Craig Weber	2,261	8.07
Total votes		28,033	100.00

==== Predictions ====
Source	Ranking	As of
The Cook Political Report	Safe R	November 1, 2010
Rothenberg	Safe R	November 1, 2010
Sabato's Crystal Ball	Safe R	November 1, 2010
RCP	Safe R	November 1, 2010
CQ Politics	Safe R	October 28, 2010
New York Times	Safe R	November 1, 2010
FiveThirtyEight	Safe R	November 1, 2010

=== General election results ===
North Carolina's 3rd district general election, November 2, 2010
Party	Candidate	Votes	%
Republican	Walter B. Jones Jr. (incumbent)	143,225	71.86
Democratic	Johnny Rouse	51,317	25.75
Libertarian	Darryl Holloman	4,762	2.39
Total votes		199,304	100.00

== District 4 ==
2010 North Carolina's 4th congressional district election
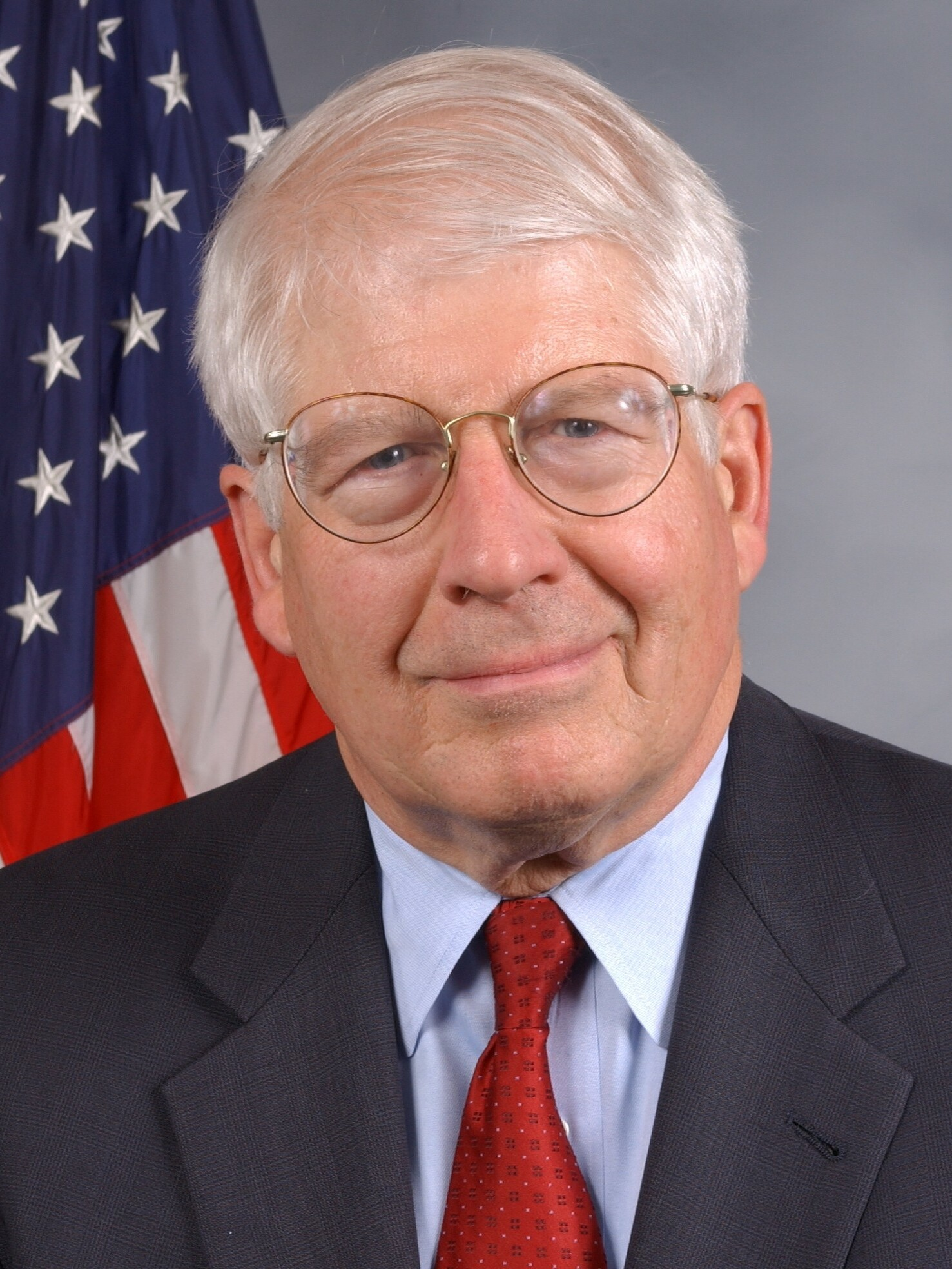

Nominee	David Price	B.J. Lawson
Party	Democratic	Republican
Popular vote	155,384	116,448
Percentage	57.2%	42.8%
U.S. Representative before election
David Price
Democratic
Elected U.S. Representative
David Price
Democratic

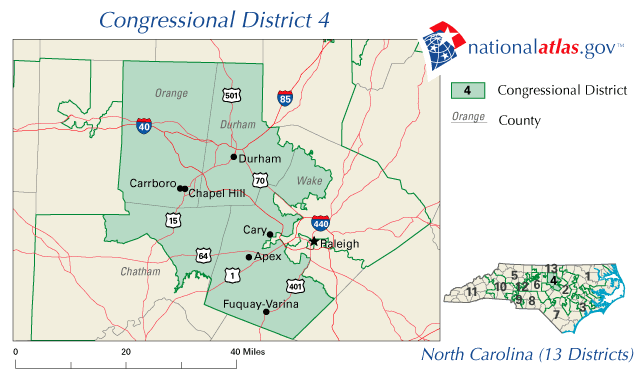
North Carolina's 4th congressional district in 2010

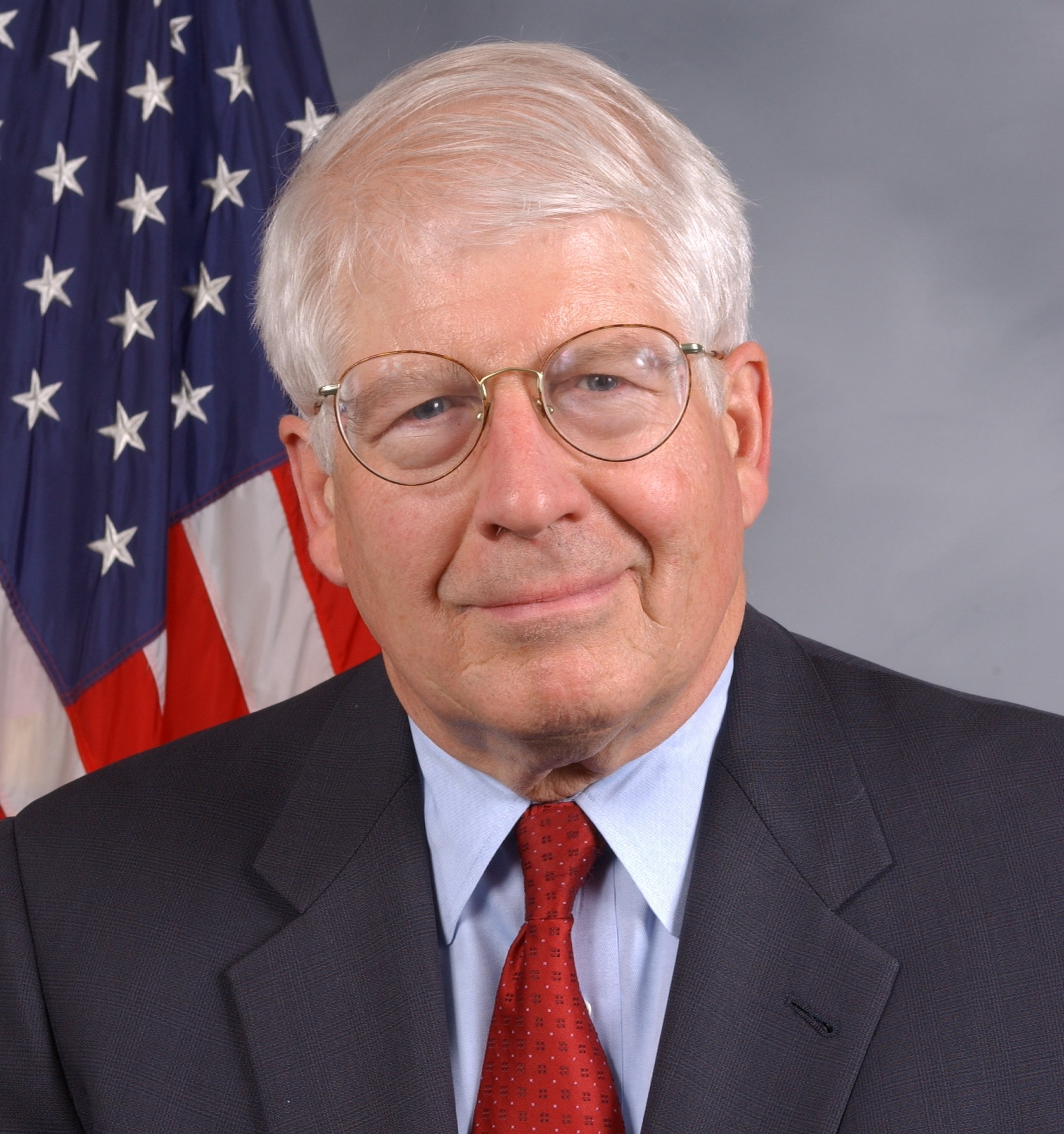
David Price, who was re-elected as the U.S. representative for the 4th district

The 4th district included Chapel Hill, Durham, and parts of Cary and Raleigh. The district's population was 66 percent white, 19 percent black, 8 percent Hispanic and 6 percent Asian (see race and ethnicity in the United States census); 91 percent were high school graduates and 52 percent had received a bachelor's degree or higher. Its median income was $65,138. In the 2008 presidential election the district gave 62 percent of its vote to Democratic nominee Barack Obama and 37 percent to Republican nominee John McCain.

Democrat David Price, who took office in 1997 and previously served from 1987 to 1995, was the incumbent. Price was re-elected in 2008 with 63 percent of the vote. In 2010 Price's opponent in the general election was Republican nominee B.J. Lawson, who also ran in 2008. Price was unopposed for the Democratic nomination. David Burnett, the owner of a roofing company; George Hutchins, a Gulf War veteran; and Frank Roche, a former Wall Street executive, also sought the Republican nomination.

Price raised $994,557 and spent $1,335,750. Lawson raised $472,914 and spent $474,716. Burnett raised $12,783 and spent $12,540. Hutchins raised $8,942 and spent $18,944. Roche raised $94,711 and spent the same amount.

In a poll of 1,038 likely voters, conducted by Action Solutions for Lawson's campaign in August 2010, Lawson led with 46.5 percent of the vote to Price's 46.1 percent. Prior to the election FiveThirtyEight's forecast gave Price a 99 percent chance of winning and projected that he would receive 59 percent of the vote to Lawson's 41 percent. On election day Price was re-elected with 57 percent of the vote to Lawson's 43 percent. Price was again re-elected in 2012 and 2014.

=== Republican primary results ===
North Carolina's 4th district Republican primary, May 4, 2010
Party	Candidate	Votes	%
Republican	B.J. Lawson	10,449	45.99
Republican	Frank Roche	9,228	40.61
Republican	David Burnett	1,967	8.66
Republican	George Hutchins	1,077	4.74
Total votes		22,721	100.00

==== Predictions ====
Source	Ranking	As of
The Cook Political Report	Safe D	November 1, 2010
Rothenberg	Safe D	November 1, 2010
Sabato's Crystal Ball	Safe D	November 1, 2010
RCP	Likely D	November 1, 2010
CQ Politics	Safe D	October 28, 2010
New York Times	Safe D	November 1, 2010
FiveThirtyEight	Safe D	November 1, 2010

=== General election results ===
North Carolina's 4th district general election, November 2, 2010
Party	Candidate	Votes	%
Democratic	David Price (incumbent)	155,384	57.16
Republican	B.J. Lawson	116,448	42.84
Total votes		271,832	100.00

== District 5 ==
2010 North Carolina's 5th congressional district election
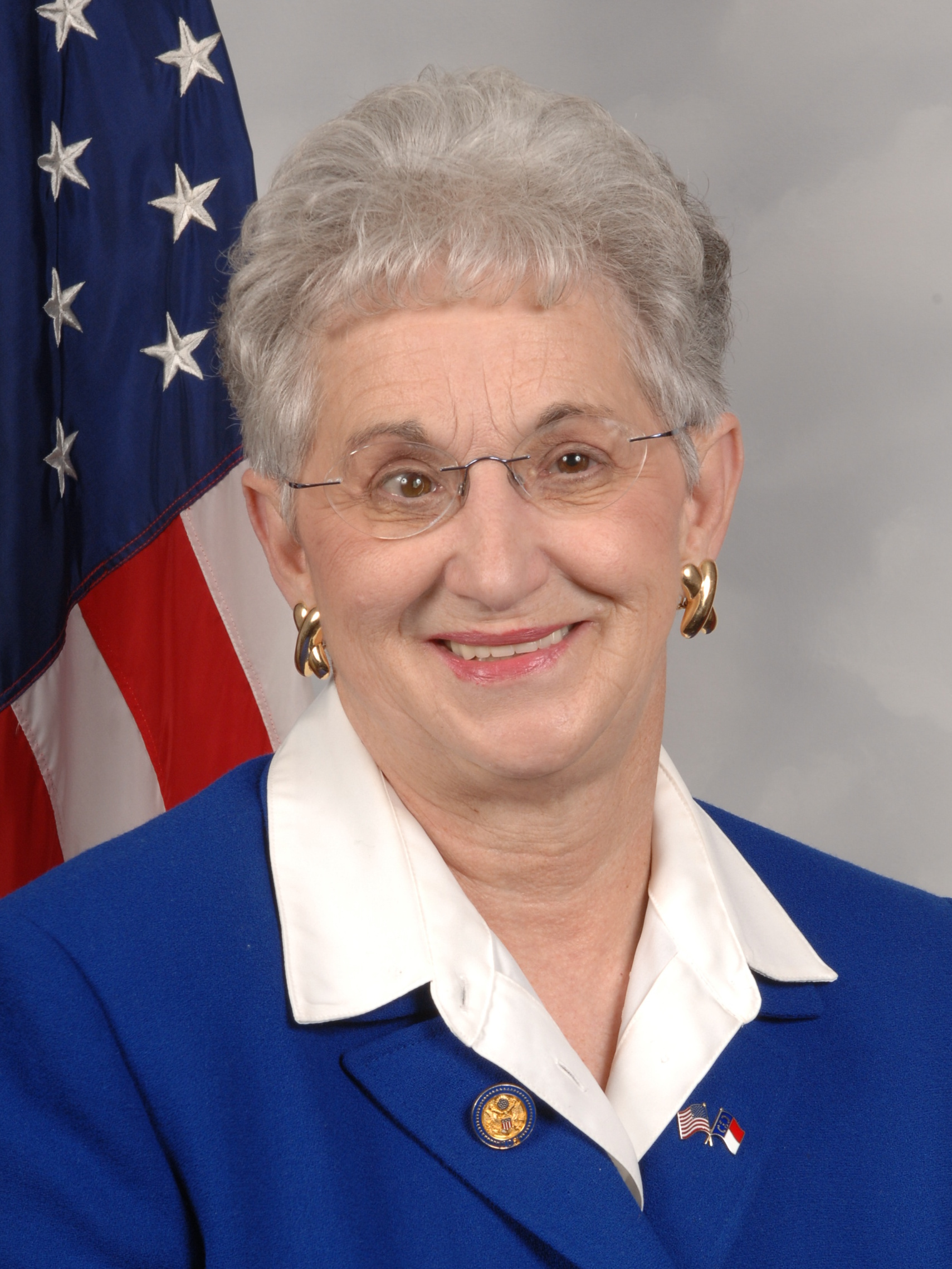

Nominee	Virginia Foxx	Billy Kennedy
Party	Republican	Democratic
Popular vote	140,525	72,762
Percentage	65.9%	34.1%
U.S. Representative before election
Virginia Foxx
Republican
Elected U.S. Representative
Virginia Foxx
Republican

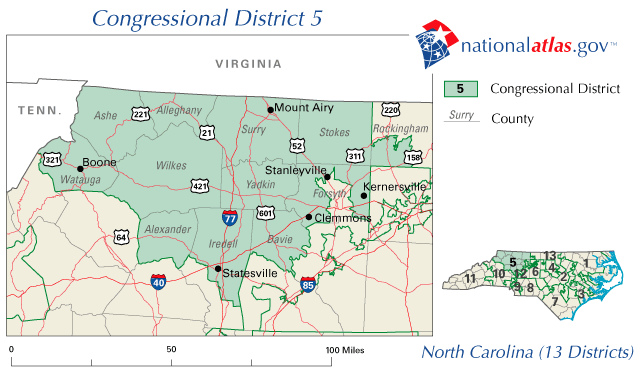
North Carolina's 5th congressional district in 2010

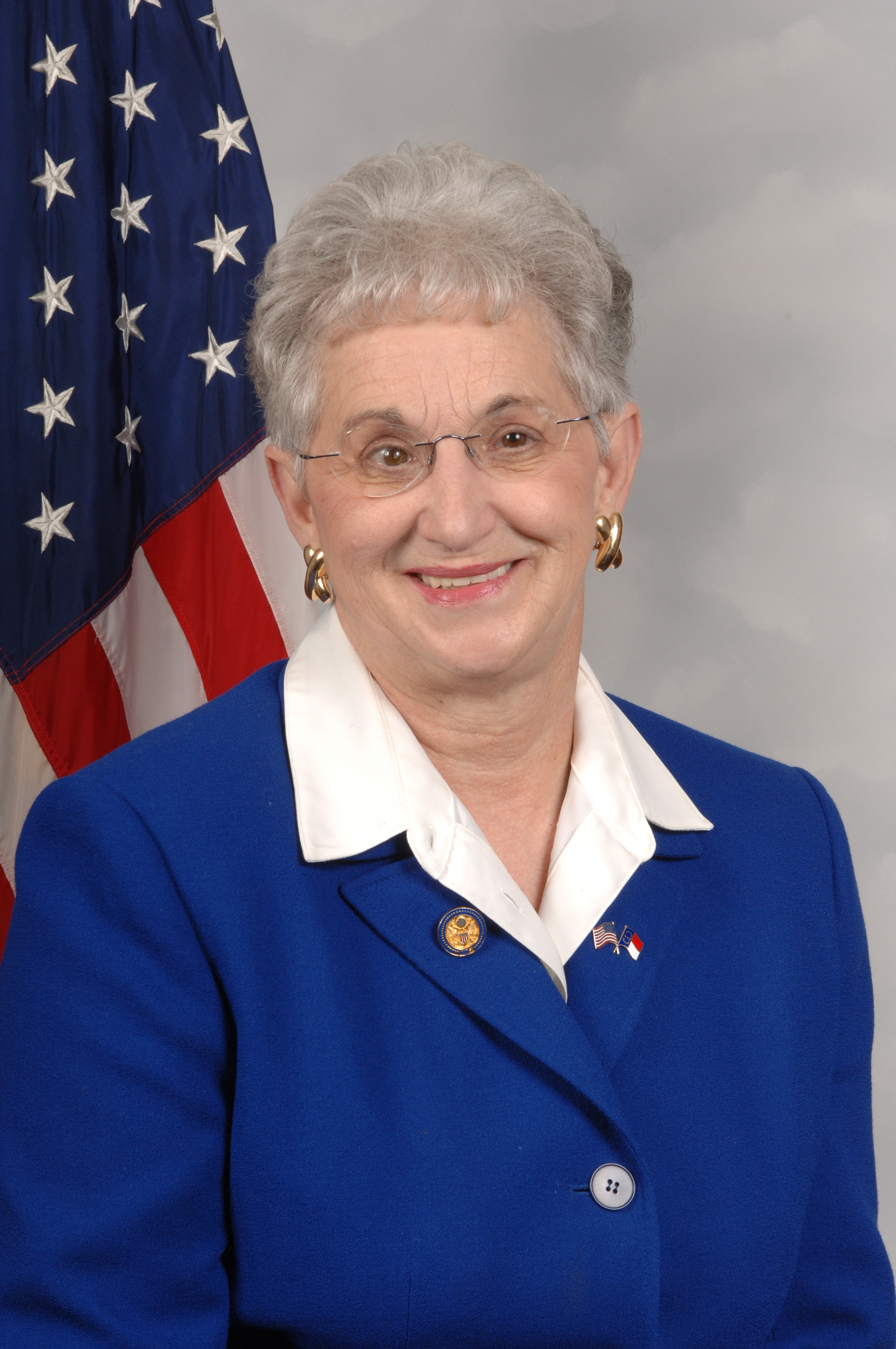
Virginia Foxx, who was re-elected as the U.S. representative for the 5th district

The 5th district included parts of Kernersville, Statesville and Winston-Salem. The district's population was 85 percent white, 7 percent black and 6 percent Hispanic (see race and ethnicity in the United States census); 81 percent were high school graduates and 22 percent had received a bachelor's degree or higher. Its median income was $45,133. In the 2008 presidential election the district gave 61 percent of its vote to Republican nominee John McCain and 38 percent to Democratic nominee Barack Obama.

Republican Virginia Foxx, who took office in 2005, was the incumbent. Foxx was re-elected in 2008 with 58 percent of the vote. In 2010 Foxx's opponent in the general election was Democratic nominee Billy Kennedy, a radio host. Keith Gardner, the owner of a medical-practice management business, also sought the Republican nomination. Kennedy was unopposed for the Democratic nomination.

Foxx raised $853,579 and spent $575,301. Kennedy raised $332,361 and spent $322,140. Prior to the election FiveThirtyEight's forecast gave Foxx a 100 percent chance of winning and projected that she would receive 64 percent of the vote to Kennedy's 34 percent. On election day Foxx was re-elected with 66 percent of the vote to Kennedy's 34 percent. Foxx was again re-elected in 2012 and 2014.

=== Republican primary results ===
North Carolina's 5th district Republican primary, May 4, 2010
Party	Candidate	Votes	%
Republican	Virginia Foxx (incumbent)	38,174	79.84
Republican	Keith Gardner	9,639	20.16
Total votes		47,813	100.00

==== Predictions ====
Source	Ranking	As of
The Cook Political Report	Safe R	November 1, 2010
Rothenberg	Safe R	November 1, 2010
Sabato's Crystal Ball	Safe R	November 1, 2010
RCP	Safe R	November 1, 2010
CQ Politics	Safe R	October 28, 2010
New York Times	Safe R	November 1, 2010
FiveThirtyEight	Safe R	November 1, 2010

=== General election results ===
North Carolina's 5th district general election, November 2, 2010
Party	Candidate	Votes	%
Republican	Virginia Foxx (incumbent)	140,525	65.89
Democratic	Billy Kennedy	72,762	34.11
Total votes		213,287	100.00

== District 6 ==
2010 North Carolina's 6th congressional district election
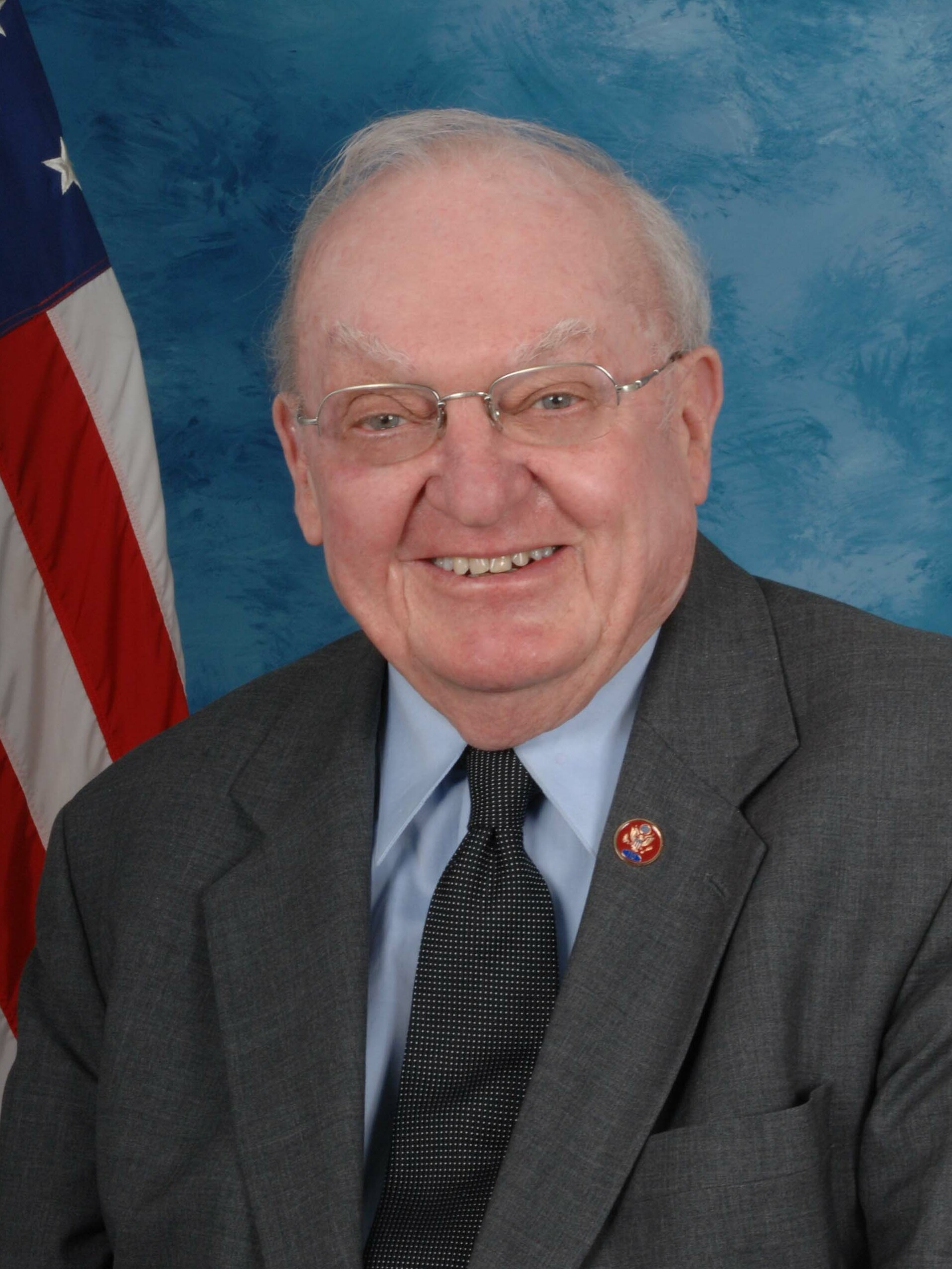

Nominee	Howard Coble	Sam Turner
Party	Republican	Democratic
Popular vote	156,252	51,507
Percentage	75.2%	24.8%
U.S. Representative before election
Howard Coble
Republican
Elected U.S. Representative
Howard Coble
Republican

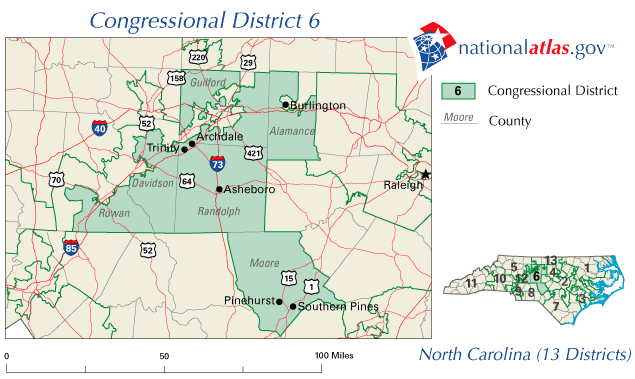
North Carolina's 6th congressional district in 2010

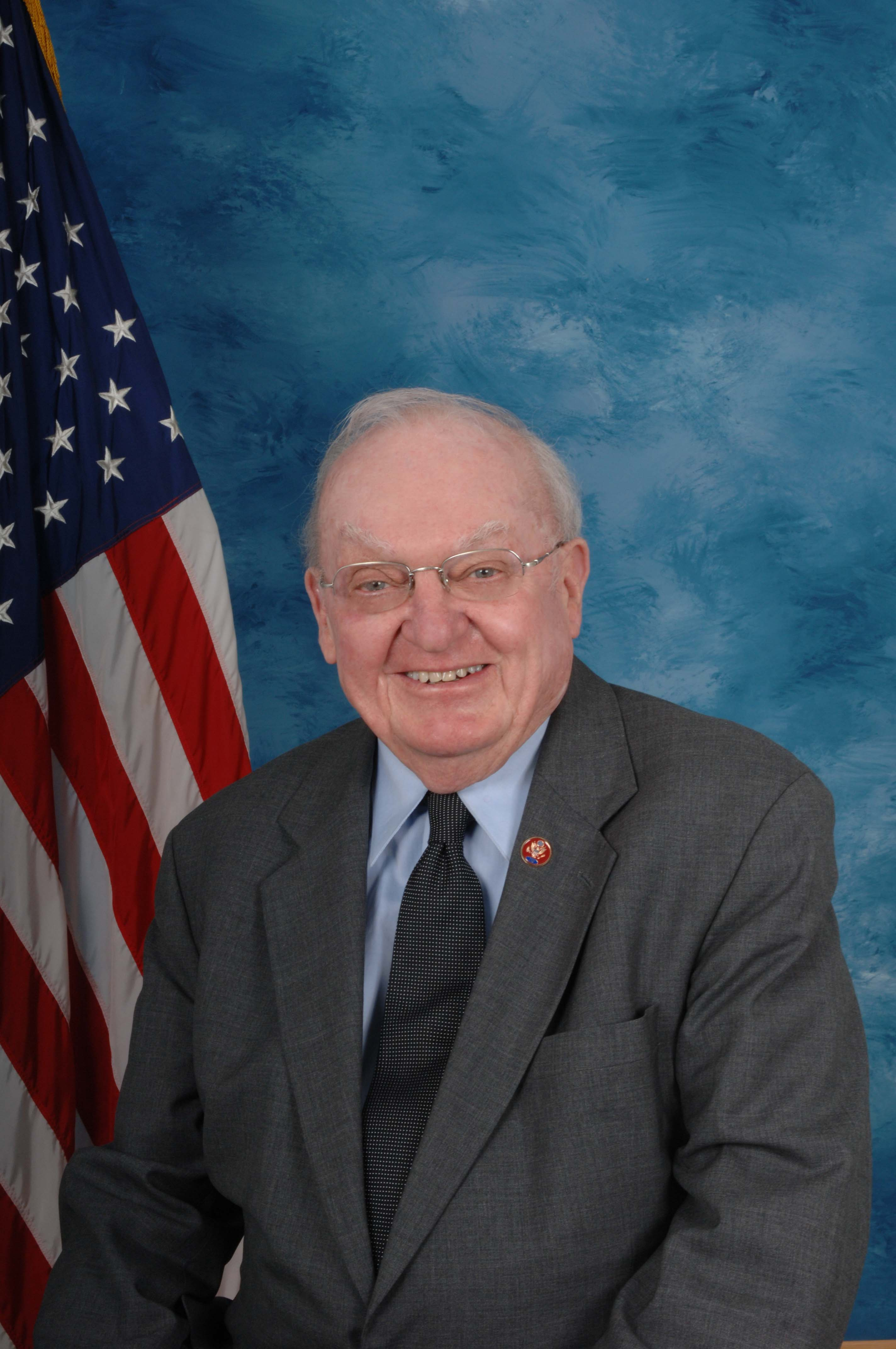
Howard Coble, who was re-elected as the U.S. representative for the 6th district

The 6th district included Asheboro and parts of Burlington, Greensboro, High Point and Thomasville. The district's population was 81 percent white, 9 percent black and 6 percent Hispanic (see race and ethnicity in the United States census); 83 percent were high school graduates and 25 percent had received a bachelor's degree or higher. Its median income was $50,721. In the 2008 presidential election the district gave 63 percent of its vote to Republican nominee John McCain and 36 percent to Democratic nominee Barack Obama.

Republican Howard Coble, who took office in 1985, was the incumbent. Coble was re-elected in 2008 with 67 percent of the vote. In 2010 Coble's opponent in the general election was Democratic nominee Sam Turner, a United Airlines pilot. Cathy Brewer Hinson, the manager of a furniture showroom building; Jon Mangin, the owner of IT Trainer Consultant and Viae Training and Consult; Jeff Phillips, a financial advisor; James Taylor, a doctor; and Billy Yow, a Guilford County commissioner, also sought the Republican nomination. Turner was unopposed in the Democratic primary.

Coble raised $503,434 and spent $925,991. Turner raised $3,775 and spent $3,722. Mangin raised $5,250 and spent $5,218. Phillips raised $8,648 and spent $9,019. Taylor raised $122,990 and spent $120,110. Yow raised $64,471 and spent $64,370.

Prior to the election FiveThirtyEight's forecast gave Coble a 100 percent chance of winning and projected that he would receive 71 percent of the vote to Turner's 27 percent. On election day Coble was re-elected with 75 percent of the vote to Turner's 25 percent. Coble was again re-elected in 2012 and retired rather than seeking re-election in 2014. He was succeeded by fellow Republican Mark Walker.

=== Republican primary results ===
North Carolina's 6th district Republican primary, May 4, 2010
Party	Candidate	Votes	%
Republican	Howard Coble (incumbent)	31,663	63.48
Republican	Billy Yow	7,929	15.90
Republican	James Taylor	7,553	15.14
Republican	Cathy Brewer Hinson	1,468	2.94
Republican	Jeff Phillips	1,095	2.20
Republican	Jon Mangin	168	0.34
Total votes		49,876	100.00

==== Predictions ====
Source	Ranking	As of
The Cook Political Report	Safe R	November 1, 2010
Rothenberg	Safe R	November 1, 2010
Sabato's Crystal Ball	Safe R	November 1, 2010
RCP	Safe R	November 1, 2010
CQ Politics	Safe R	October 28, 2010
New York Times	Safe R	November 1, 2010
FiveThirtyEight	Safe R	November 1, 2010

=== General election results ===
North Carolina's 6th district general election, November 4, 2010
Party	Candidate	Votes	%
Republican	Howard Coble (incumbent)	156,252	75.21
Democratic	Sam Turner	51,507	24.79
Total votes		207,759	100.00

== District 7 ==
2010 North Carolina's 7th congressional district election
- November 2, 2010
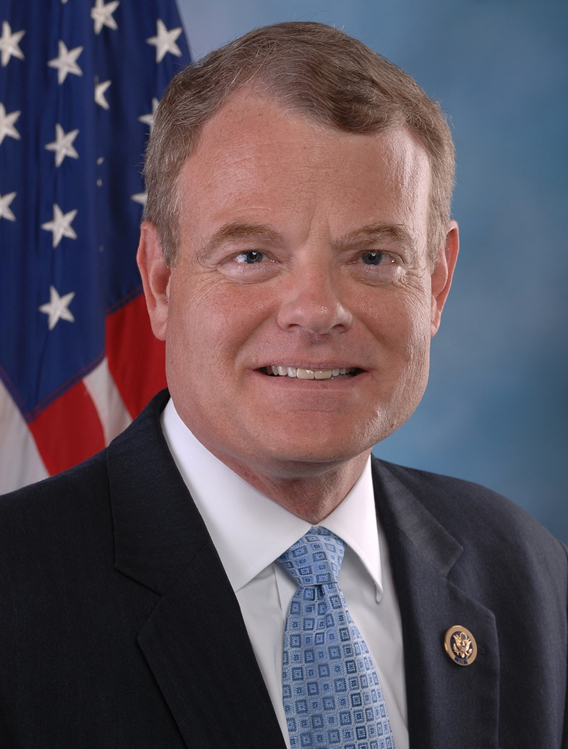

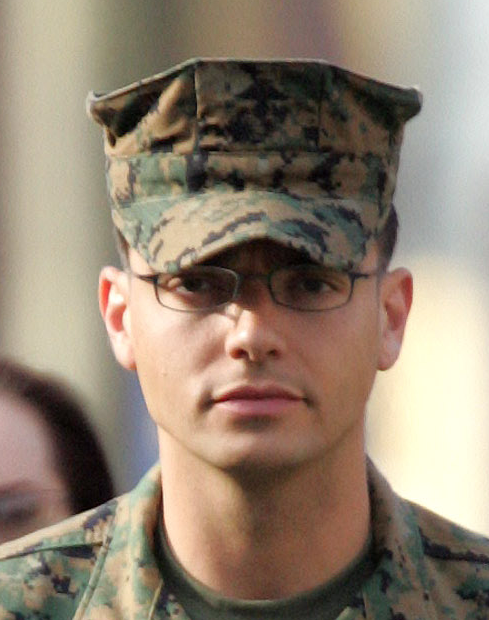
Nominee	Mike McIntyre	Ilario Pantano
Party	Democratic	Republican
Popular vote	113,957	98,328
Percentage	53.7%	46.3%
- County results McIntyre: 50−60% 60−70% 70−80% Pantano: 50−60% 60−70%
U.S. Representative before election
Mike McIntyre
Democratic
Elected U.S. Representative
Mike McIntyre
Democratic

The 7th district included Lumberton, Wilmington and part of Fayetteville. The district's population was 64 percent white, 21 percent black, 7 percent Native American and 6 percent Hispanic (see race and ethnicity in the United States census); 80 percent were high school graduates and 21 percent had received a bachelor's degree or higher. Its median income was $41,693. In the 2008 presidential election the district gave 52 percent of its vote to Republican nominee John McCain and 47 percent to Democratic nominee Barack Obama.

Democrat Mike McIntyre, who took office in 1997, was the incumbent. McIntyre was re-elected in 2008 with 69 percent of the vote. In 2010 McIntyre's opponent in the general election was Republican nominee Ilario Pantano, a former U.S. Marine who killed two unarmed Iraqi prisoners in 2004. McIntyre was unopposed in the Democratic primary. Will Breazeale, an airline pilot who was the Republican nominee in the 7th district in 2008, and Randy Crow also sought the Republican nomination.

McIntyre raised $1,320,793 and spent $1,886,262. Pantano raised $1,234,943 and spent $1,224,496. Breazeale raised $53,034 and spent $52,402.

In a poll of 400 likely voters, conducted on August 31 and September 2, 2010 by Public Opinion Strategies, Pantano led with 48 percent to McIntyre's 41 percent. A poll of 450 registered voters, conducted by SurveyUSA for the Civitas Institute in September 2010, found 46 percent intended to vote for Pantano while 45 percent supported McIntyre. In a poll of 400 likely voters, conducted by Grove Insight in October 2010 for the Democratic Congressional Campaign Committee, McIntyre led with 52 percent to Pantano's 41 percent.

Prior to the election FiveThirtyEight's forecast gave McIntyre a 51 percent chance of winning and projected that he would receive 50.1 percent of the vote to Pantano's 49.9 percent. On election day McIntyre was re-elected with 54 percent of the vote to Pantano's 46 percent. McIntyre was again re-elected in 2012 and retired rather than seeking re-election in 2014. He was succeeded by Republican David Rouzer. Pantano unsuccessfully sought the Republican nomination in the 7th district in 2012 and in 2013 became the director of the North Carolina State Division of Veterans Affairs. Breazeale unsuccessfully ran for South Carolina Adjutant General in 2014.

=== Republican primary results ===
North Carolina's 7th district Republican primary, May 4, 2010
Party	Candidate	Votes	%
Republican	Ilario Pantano	17,177	51.02
Republican	Will Breazeale	11,629	34.54
Republican	Randy Crow	4,862	14.44
Total votes		33,668	100.00

==== Polling ====
Poll Source	Dates Administered	Mike McIntyre (D)	Ilario Pantano (R)	Undecided
Grove Insight	October 3–5, 2010	52%	41%	–
SurveyUSA	September 24–26, 2010	45%	46%	–
Public Opinion Strategies	August 31 – September 2, 2010	41%	48%	–

==== Predictions ====
Source	Ranking	As of
The Cook Political Report	Tossup	November 1, 2010
Rothenberg	Tilt D	November 1, 2010
Sabato's Crystal Ball	Likely D	November 1, 2010
RCP	Tossup	November 1, 2010
CQ Politics	Lean D	October 28, 2010
New York Times	Lean D	November 1, 2010
FiveThirtyEight	Tossup	November 1, 2010

=== General election results ===
U.S. House of Representatives 7th district general election 2010
Party	Candidate	Votes	%
Democratic	Mike McIntyre (incumbent)	113,957	53.68
Republican	Ilario Pantano	98,328	46.32
Total votes		212,285	100.00

== District 8 ==
2010 North Carolina's 8th congressional district election

Nominee	Harold Johnson	Tim D'Annunzio
Party	Republican	Republican
Popular vote	9,261	5,928
Percentage	61.0%	39.0%
U.S. Representative before election
Larry Kissell
Democratic
Elected U.S. Representative
Harold Johnson
Republican

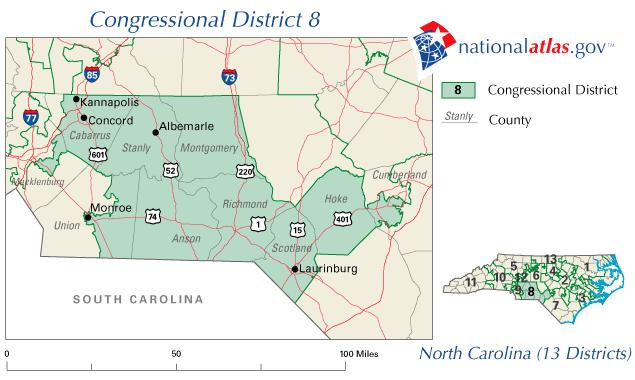
North Carolina's 8th congressional district in 2010

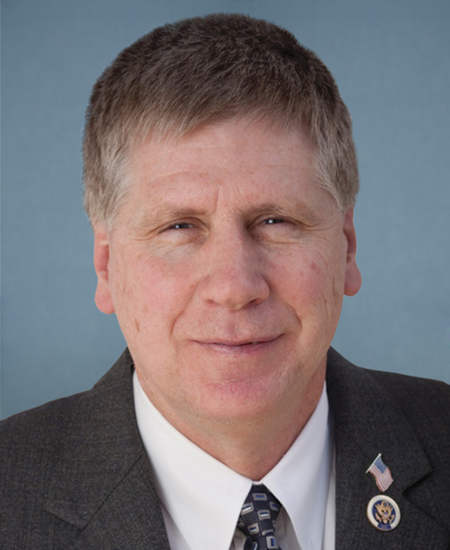
Larry Kissell, who was re-elected as the U.S. representative for the 8th district

The 8th district included parts of Charlotte, Concord and Fayetteville. The district's population was 58 percent white, 28 percent black and 9 percent Hispanic (see race and ethnicity in the United States census); 82 percent were high school graduates and 20 percent had received a bachelor's degree or higher. Its median income was $43,227. In the 2008 presidential election the district gave 52 percent of its vote to Democratic nominee Barack Obama and 47 percent to Republican nominee John McCain.

Democrat Larry Kissell, who took office in 2009, was the incumbent. Kissell was elected in 2008 with 55 percent of the vote. In 2010 Kissell's opponent in the general election was Republican nominee Harold Johnson, a sportscaster. Libertarian Party nominee Thomas Hill also ran. Nancy Shakir, a retired teacher, also sought the Democratic nomination. Lee Cornelison, an accountant and Vietnam veteran; Tim D'Annunzio, a business owner and former paratrooper; Darrell Day, a preacher; Lou Huddleston, an army officer; and Hal Jordan, a computer programmer, also sought the Republican nomination. Wendell Fant, a former member of Kissell's staff, was recruited to run as an independent by N.C. Families First, but said in June 2010 that he would not run.

Kissell raised $1,104,141 and spent $1,105,922. Johnson raised $1,079,623 and spent $1,066,424. Cornelison raised $20,531 and spent the same amount. D'Annunzio raised $1,595,547 and spent the same amount. Day raised $25,790 and spent the same amount. Huddleston raised $215,115 and spent $214,555. Jordan raised $210,068 and spent the same amount.

In a poll of 744 voters conducted by Public Policy Polling (PPP) in January 2010, Kissell led with 53 percent to Johnson's 39 percent while 8 percent were undecided. A PPP poll of 400 voters, conducted in June 2010, found Kissell leading with 41 percent to Johnson's 35 percent in a two-way race, while 23 percent were undecided; and with 40 percent to Johnson's 30 percent and Fant's 14 percent in a three-way contest, while 16 percent remained undecided. A poll conducted for Kissell's campaign by Anzalone Liszt Research between August 19 and 24, 2010, with a sample of 500 likely voters, found Kissell leading with 49 percent to Johnson's 32 percent and Hill's 7 percent, while 12 percent were undecided. In a poll of 400 likely voters, conducted by Greenberg Quinlan Rosner Research for the Democratic Congressional Campaign Committee between August 25 and 29, 2010, Kissell led with 48 percent to Johnson's 36 percent while 6 percent supported Hill. A poll of 400 likely voters, conducted by Public Opinion Strategies for Johnson's campaign on August 29 and 30, 2010, found Kissell had the support of 39 percent while 34 percent favored Johnson and 27 percent either were undecided or supported Hill. In a poll of 450 registered voters, conducted by SurveyUSA for the Civitas Institute in October 2010, Kissell led with 46 percent to Johnson's 45 percent while 9 percent were undecided.

Prior to the election FiveThirtyEight's forecast gave Johnson a 53 percent chance of winning and projected that he would receive 49.0 percent of the vote to Kissell's 48.5 percent. On election day Kissell was re-elected with 53 percent of the vote to Johnson's 44 percent. Kissell unsuccessfully sought re-election in 2012 and was succeeded by Republican Richard Hudson.

=== Democratic primary results ===
North Carolina's 8th district Democratic primary, May 4, 2010
Party	Candidate	Votes	%
Democratic	Larry Kissell (incumbent)	24,541	62.70
Democratic	Nancy Shakir	14,600	37.30
Total votes		39,141	100.00

=== Republican primary results ===
North Carolina's 8th district Republican primary, May 4, 2010
Party	Candidate	Votes	%
Republican	Tim D'Annunzio	9,548	36.85
Republican	Harold Johnson	8,567	33.07
Republican	Hal Jordan	4,757	18.36
Republican	Lou Huddleston	2,141	8.26
Republican	Lee Cornelison	466	1.80
Republican	Darrell Day	428	1.65
Total votes		25,907	100.00

=== Republican primary runoff results ===
North Carolina's 8th district Republican primary runoff, June 22, 2010
Party	Candidate	Votes	%
Republican	Harold Johnson	9,261	60.97
Republican	Tim D'Annunzio	5,928	39.03
Total votes		15,189	100.00

==== Predictions ====
Source	Ranking	As of
The Cook Political Report	Tossup	November 1, 2010
Rothenberg	Lean D	November 1, 2010
Sabato's Crystal Ball	Lean R (flip)	November 1, 2010
RCP	Tossup	November 1, 2010
CQ Politics	Tossup	October 28, 2010
New York Times	Tossup	November 1, 2010
FiveThirtyEight	Tossup	November 1, 2010

=== General election results ===
North Carolina's 8th district general election, November 2, 2010
Party	Candidate	Votes	%
Democratic	Larry Kissell (incumbent)	88,776	53.02
Republican	Harold Johnson	73,129	43.67
Libertarian	Thomas Hill	5,098	3.04
Write-In	Write-in candidates	439	0.26
Total votes		167,442	100.00

== District 9 ==
2010 North Carolina's 9th congressional district election
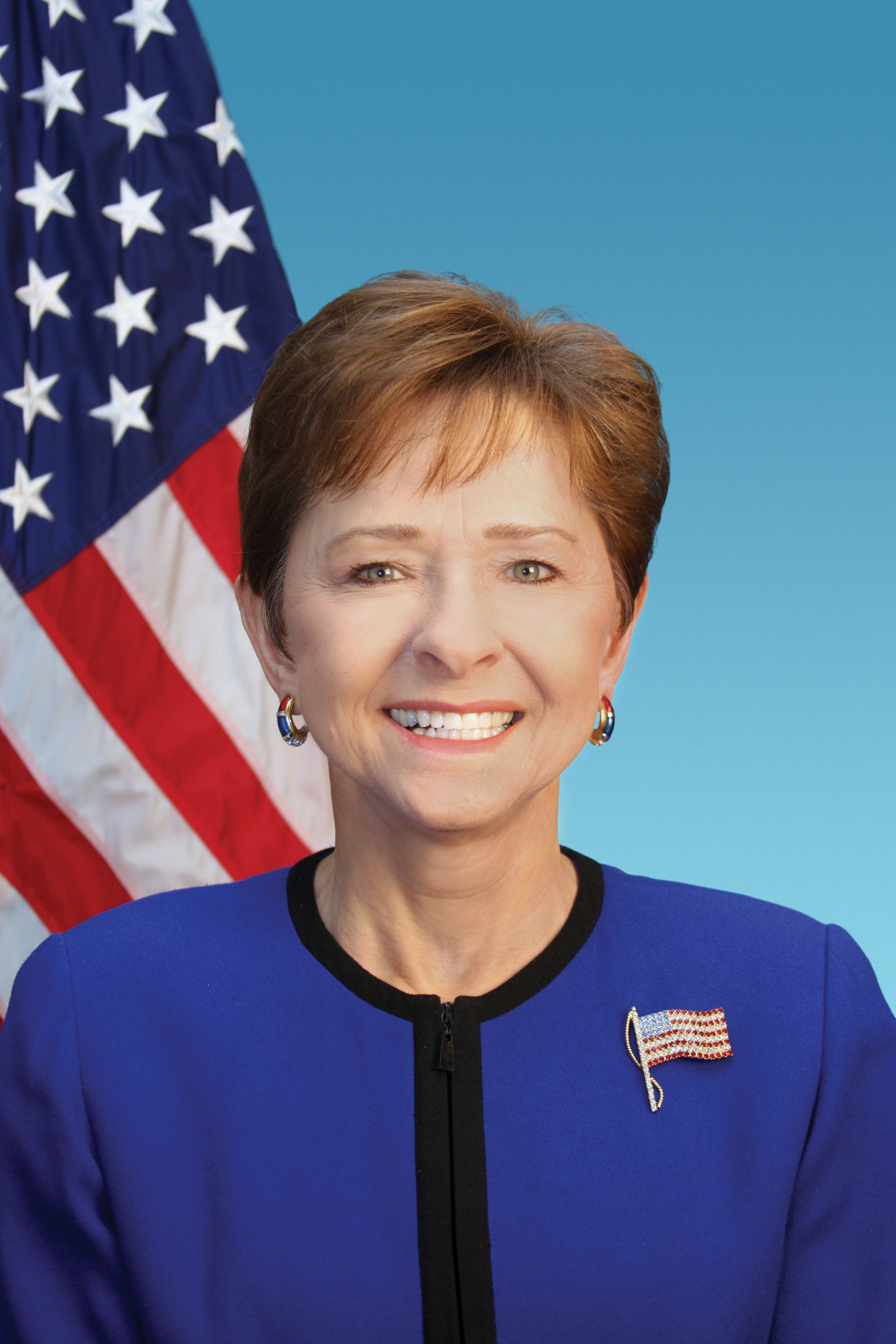

Nominee	Sue Myrick	Jeff Doctor
Party	Republican	Democratic
Popular vote	158,790	71,450
Percentage	69.0%	31.0%
- County results Myrick: 60–70% 70–80%
U.S. Representative before election
Sue Myrick
Republican
Elected U.S. Representative
Sue Myrick
Republican

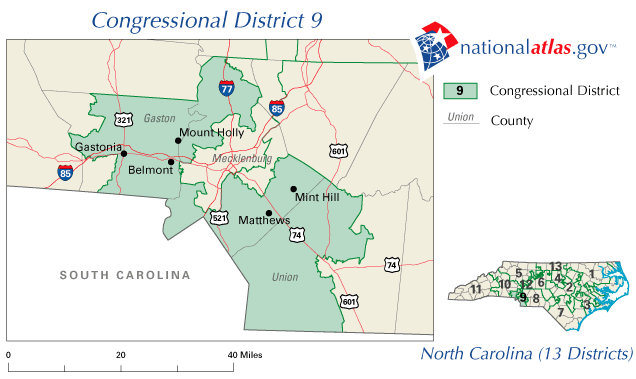
North Carolina's 9th congressional district in 2010

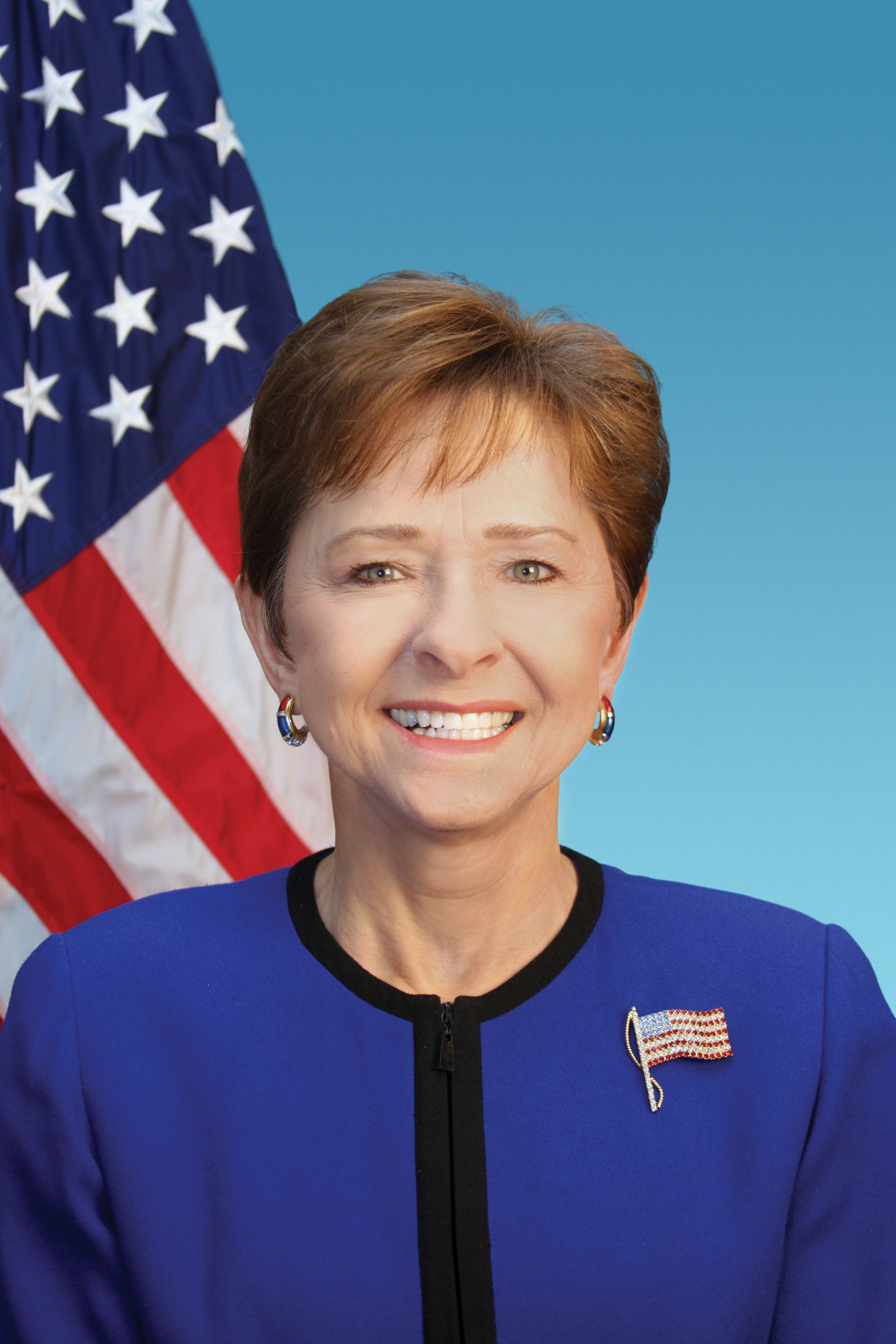
Sue Myrick, who was re-elected as the U.S. representative for the 9th district

The 9th district included Huntersville and parts of Charlotte and Gastonia. The district's population was 76 percent white, 13 percent black and 7 percent Hispanic (see race and ethnicity in the United States census); 90 percent were high school graduates and 40 percent had received a bachelor's degree or higher. Its median income was $64,255. In the 2008 presidential election the district gave 55 percent of its vote to Republican nominee John McCain and 45 percent to Democratic nominee John McCain.

Republican Sue Myrick, who took office in 1995, was the incumbent. Myrick was re-elected in 2008 with 62 percent of the vote. In 2010 Myrick's opponent in the general election was Democratic nominee Jeff Doctor, a small business owner. Myrick and Doctor were unopposed in their respective primaries.

Myrick raised $1,038,833 and spent $997,492. Doctor raised $110,132 and spent $109,413. Prior to the election FiveThirtyEight's forecast gave Myrick a 100 percent chance of winning and projected that she would receive 67 percent of the vote to Doctor's 31 percent. On election day Myrick was re-elected with 69 percent of the vote to Doctor's 31 percent. Myrick retired rather than seeking re-election in 2012 and was succeeded by fellow Republican Robert Pittenger.

=== Predictions ===
Source	Ranking	As of
The Cook Political Report	Safe R	November 1, 2010
Rothenberg	Safe R	November 1, 2010
Sabato's Crystal Ball	Safe R	November 1, 2010
RCP	Safe R	November 1, 2010
CQ Politics	Safe R	October 28, 2010
New York Times	Safe R	November 1, 2010
FiveThirtyEight	Safe R	November 1, 2010

=== General election results ===
North Carolina's 9th district general election, November 2, 2010
Party	Candidate	Votes	%
Republican	Sue Myrick (incumbent)	158,790	68.97
Democratic	Jeff Doctor	71,450	31.03
Total votes		230,240	100.00

== District 10 ==
2010 North Carolina's 10th congressional district election
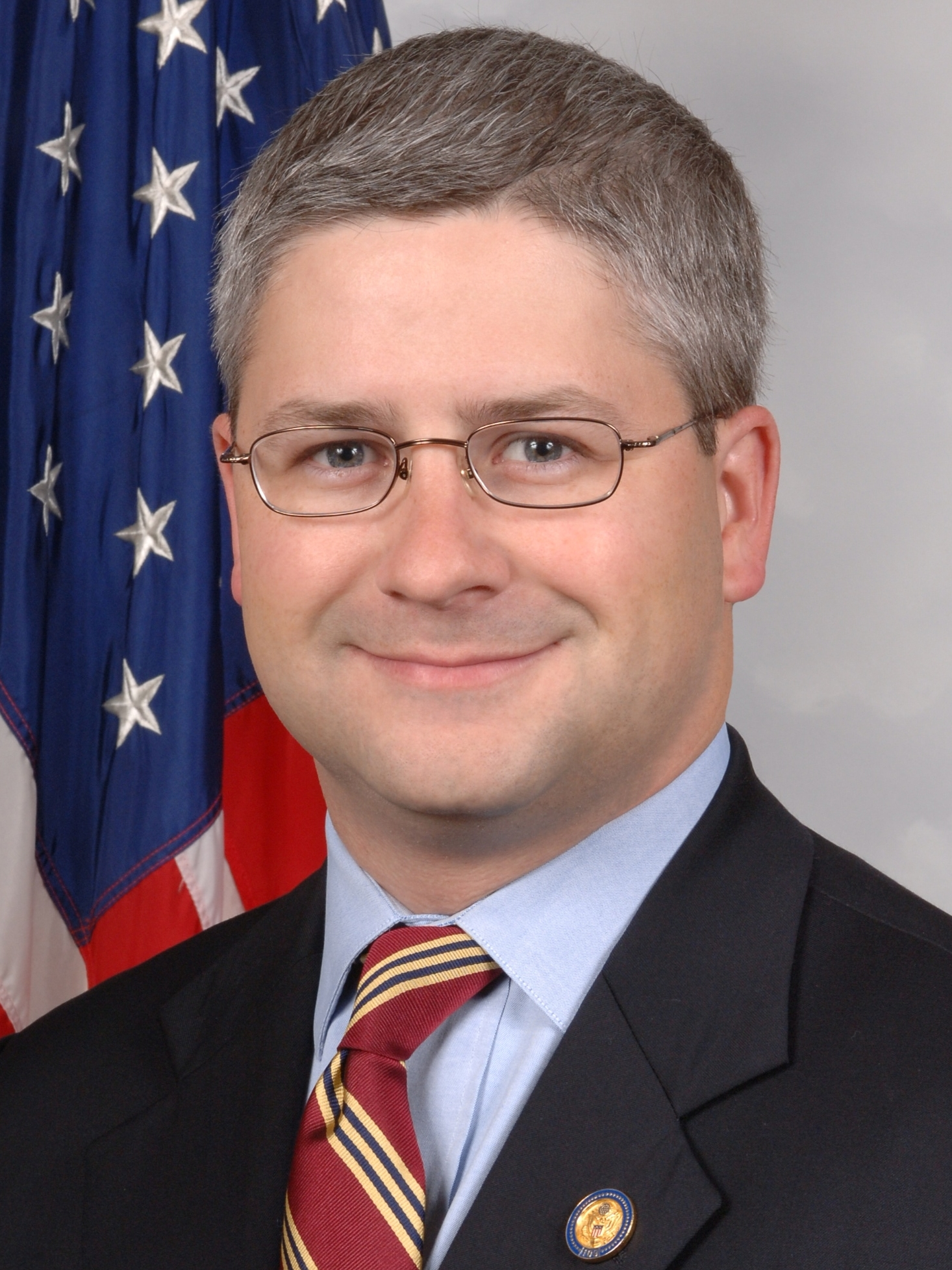

Nominee	Patrick McHenry	Jeff Gregory
Party	Republican	Democratic
Popular vote	130,813	52,972
Percentage	71.2%	28.8%
- County results Mchenry: 60–70% 70–80%
U.S. Representative before election
Patrick McHenry
Republican
Elected U.S. Representative
Patrick McHenry
Republican

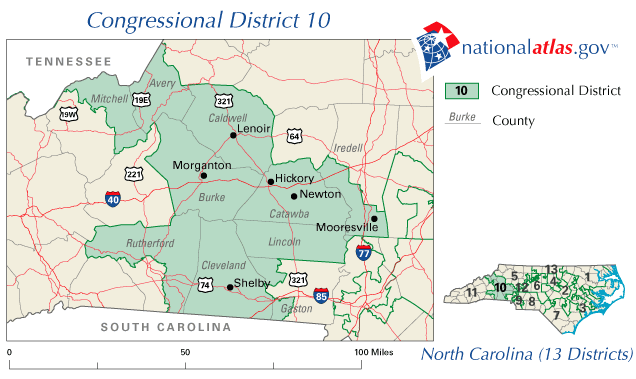
North Carolina's 10th congressional district in 2010

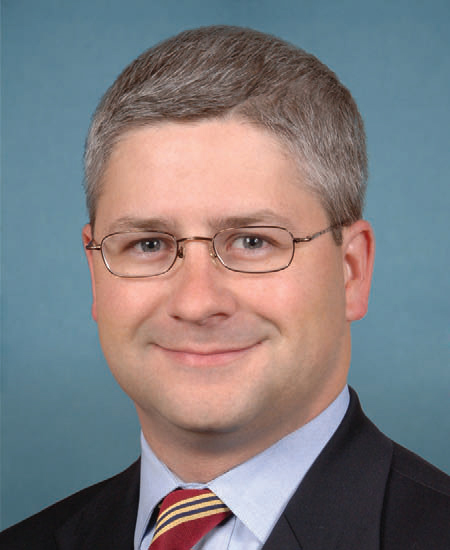
Patrick McHenry, who was re-elected as the U.S. representative for the 10th district

The 10th district included Hickory, Shelby and part of Mooresville. The district's population was 83 percent white, 9 percent black and 5 percent Hispanic (see race and ethnicity in the United States census); 78 percent were high school graduates and 17 percent had received a bachelor's degree or higher. Its median income was $42,241. In the 2008 presidential election the district gave 63 percent of its vote to Republican nominee John McCain and 36 percent to Democratic nominee Barack Obama.

Republican Patrick McHenry, who took office in 2005, was the incumbent. McHenry was re-elected with 58 percent of the vote in 2008. In 2010 McHenry's opponent in the general election was Democratic nominee Jeff Gregory, a retired postmaster. David Michael Boldon; Scott Keadle, an Iredell County Commissioner and dentist; and Vance Patterson, a businessman and vice-chair of the Burke County Republican Party, also sought the Republican nomination. Anne Fischer, who was the Democratic nominee in the 10th district in 2004, also sought the Democratic nomination.

McHenry raised $1,015,155 and spent $886,897. Keadle raised $75,680 and spent $75,645. Patterson raised $283,476 and spent $284,788.

Prior to the election FiveThirtyEight's forecast gave McHenry a 100 percent chance of winning and projected that he would receive 66 percent of the vote to Gregory's 32 percent. On election day McHenry was re-elected with 71 percent of the vote to Gregory's 29 percent. McHenry was re-elected in 2012 and 2014. Patterson unsuccessfully sought the Republican nomination in the 11th district in 2012.

=== Republican primary results ===
North Carolina's 10th district Republican primary, May 4, 2010
Party	Candidate	Votes	%
Republican	Patrick McHenry (incumbent)	27,657	63.09
Republican	Vance Patterson	11,392	25.99
Republican	Scott Keadle	3,604	8.22
Republican	David Michael Boldon	1,181	2.69
Total votes		43,834	100.00

=== Democratic primary results ===
North Carolina's 10th district Democratic primary, May 4, 2010
Party	Candidate	Votes	%
Democratic	Jeff Gregory	9,621	50.91
Democratic	Anne Fischer	9,277	49.09
Total votes		18,898	100.00

==== Predictions ====
Source	Ranking	As of
The Cook Political Report	Safe R	November 1, 2010
Rothenberg	Safe R	November 1, 2010
Sabato's Crystal Ball	Safe R	November 1, 2010
RCP	Safe R	November 1, 2010
CQ Politics	Safe R	October 28, 2010
New York Times	Safe R	November 1, 2010
FiveThirtyEight	Safe R	November 1, 2010

=== General election results ===
North Carolina's 10th district general election, November 2, 2010
Party	Candidate	Votes	%
Republican	Patrick McHenry (incumbent)	130,813	71.18
Democratic	Jeff Gregory	52,972	28.82
Total votes		183,785	100.00

== District 11 ==
2010 North Carolina's 11th congressional district election
- November 2, 2010
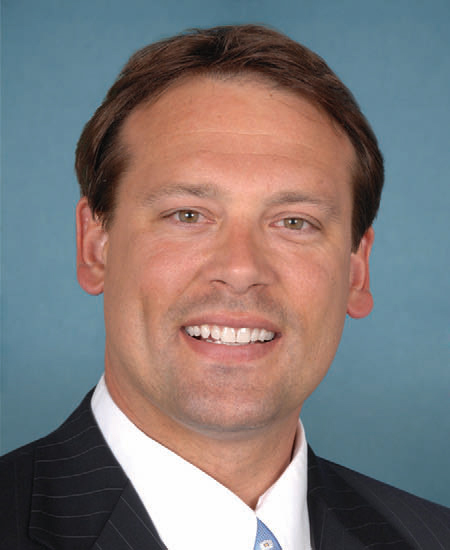

Nominee	Heath Shuler	Jeff Miller
Party	Democratic	Republican
Popular vote	131,225	110,246
Percentage	54.3%	45.7%
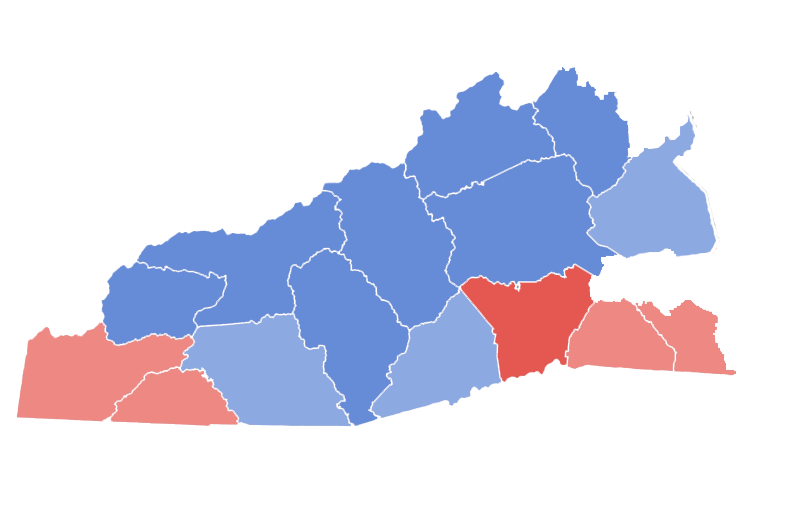
- County results Shuler: 50−60% 60−70% Miller: 50−60% 60−70%
U.S. Representative before election
Heath Shuler
Democratic
Elected U.S. Representative
Heath Shuler
Democratic

The 11th district included Asheville and Hendersonville. The district's population was 88 percent white, 5 percent black and 4 percent Hispanic (see race and ethnicity in the United States census); 84 percent were high school graduates and 25 percent had received a bachelor's degree or higher. Its median income was $41,403. In the 2008 presidential election the district gave 52 percent of its vote to Republican nominee John McCain and 47 percent to Democratic nominee Barack Obama.

Democrat Heath Shuler, who took office in 2007, was the incumbent. Shuler was re-elected in 2008 with 62 percent of the vote. In 2010 Shuler's opponent in the general election was Republican nominee Jeff Miller, a businessman. Aixa Wilson, an employee of an archeology firm, also sought the Democratic nomination. Dan Eichenbaum, an ophthalmologist; Jake Howard, a retiree; Ed Krause, an attorney; Greg Newman, the former mayor of Hendersonville; and Kenny West, an insurance agent, also sought the Republican nomination.

Shuler raised $1,347,011 and spent $2,212,737. Miller raised $795,054 and spent $782,645. Eichenbaum raised $140,423 and spent $136,521. Newman raised $44,195 and spent the same amount.

In a poll of 300 likely voters, conducted by Public Opinion Strategies for Miller's campaign in June 2010, Shuler led with 46 percent to Miller's 34 percent while 18 percent were undecided. A poll of 500 likely voters, conducted by Anzalone Liszt Research for Shuler's campaign between July 8 and 13, 2010, found Shuler leading with 51 percent to Miller's 34 percent while 15 percent remained undecided; while a poll of 400 registered voters conducted later in July by the Civitas Institute found Shuler leasing with 45 percent to Miller's 44 percent. In a poll of 413 likely voters, conducted by Greenberg Quinlan Rosner Research (GQRR) for the Democratic Congressional Campaign Committee (DCCC) between 4 and 6, 2010, Shuler led with 54 percent to Miller's 41 percent; another GQRR poll, conducted for the DCCC between October 17 and 19, 2010, found Shuler leading with 54 percent to Miller's 39 percent.

On election day Shuler was re-elected with 54 percent of the vote to Miller's 46 percent. Shuler retired rather than seeking re-election in 2012. After redistricting the former 11th district was represented by Republicans Patrick McHenry and Mark Meadows.

=== Democratic primary results ===
North Carolina's 11th district Democratic primary, May 4, 2010
Party	Candidate	Votes	%
Democratic	Heath Shuler (incumbent)	26,223	61.37
Democratic	Aixa Wilson	16,507	38.63
Total votes		42,730	100.00

=== Republican primary results ===
North Carolina's 11th district Republican primary, May 4, 2010
Party	Candidate	Votes	%
Republican	Jeff Miller	14,059	40.25
Republican	Dan Eichenbaum	11,949	34.21
Republican	Greg Newman	4,103	11.75
Republican	Kenny West	2,777	7.95
Republican	Ed Krause	1,254	3.59
Republican	Jake Howard	791	2.26
Total votes		34,933	100.00

==== Predictions ====
Source	Ranking	As of
The Cook Political Report	Lean D	November 1, 2010
Rothenberg	Likely D	November 1, 2010
Sabato's Crystal Ball	Likely D	November 1, 2010
RCP	Tossup	November 1, 2010
CQ Politics	Likely D	October 28, 2010
New York Times	Lean D	November 1, 2010
FiveThirtyEight	Likely D	November 1, 2010

=== General election results ===
North Carolina's 11th district general election, November 2, 2010
Party	Candidate	Votes	%
Democratic	Heath Shuler (incumbent)	131,225	54.34
Republican	Jeff Miller	110,246	45.66
Total votes		241,741	100.00

== District 12 ==
2010 North Carolina's 12th congressional district election

Nominee	Greg Dority	Scott Cumbie
Party	Republican	Republican
Popular vote	1,449	1,352
Percentage	51.7%	48.3%
U.S. Representative before election
Mel Watt
Democratic
Elected U.S. Representative
Greg Dority
Republican

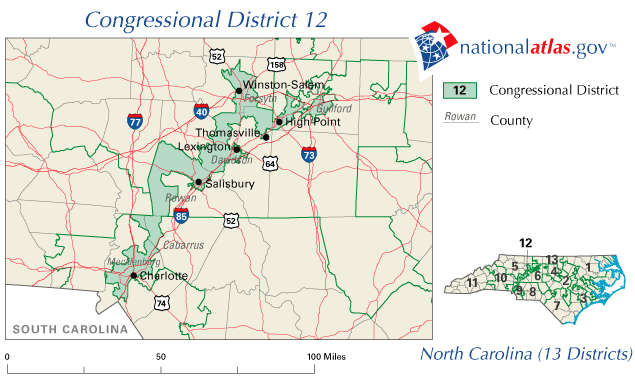
North Carolina's 12th congressional district in 2010

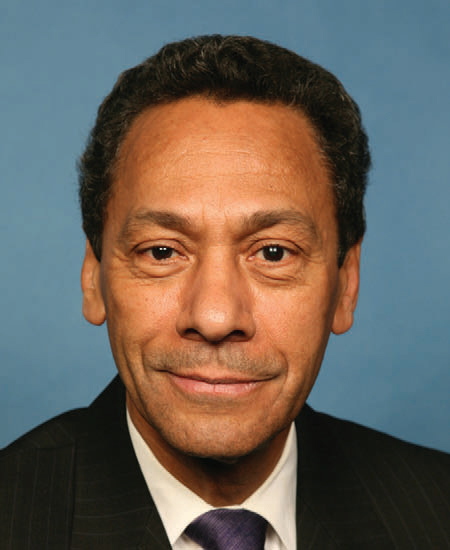
Mel Watt, who was re-elected as the U.S. representative for the 12th district

The 12th district included parts of Charlotte, Greensboro, High Point, Salisbury and Winston-Salem. The district's population was 44 percent black, 41 percent white and 11 percent Hispanic (see race and ethnicity in the United States census); 80 percent were high school graduates and 22 percent had received a bachelor's degree or higher. Its median income was $40,075. In the 2008 presidential election the district gave 71 percent of its vote to Democratic nominee Barack Obama and 29 percent to Republican nominee John McCain.

Democrat Mel Watt, who took office in 1993, was the incumbent. Watt was re-elected in 2008 with 72 percent of the vote. In 2010 Watt's opponent in the general election was Republican nominee Greg Dority, a partner in a security firm. Libertarian Party nominee Lon Cecil, an electronics engineer, also ran. Watt was unopposed for the Democratic nomination. Scott Cumbie, who worked in the computer industry; and William "Doc" Gillenwater, a retiree, also sought the Republican nomination.

Watt raised $604,719 and spent $591,204. Cecil raised $13,041 and spent $12,996. Prior to the election FiveThirtyEight's forecast gave Watt a 100 percent chance of winning and projected that he would receive 67 percent of the vote to Dority's 30 percent. On election day Watt was re-elected with 64 percent of the vote to Dority's 34 percent. Watt was again re-elected in 2012. In 2013 Watt was confirmed as director of the Federal Housing Finance Agency; he was succeeded by fellow Democrat Alma Adams.

=== Republican primary results ===
North Carolina's 12th district Republican primary, May 4, 2010
Party	Candidate	Votes	%
Republican	Scott Cumbie	5,506	39.47
Republican	Greg Dority	4,787	34.32
Republican	William "Doc" Gillenwater	3,656	26.21
Total votes		13,949	100.00

=== Republican primary runoff results ===
North Carolina's 12th district Republican primary runoff, June 22, 2010
Party	Candidate	Votes	%
Republican	Greg Dority	1,449	51.73
Republican	Scott Cumbie	1,352	48.27
Total votes		2,801	100.00

==== Predictions ====
Source	Ranking	As of
The Cook Political Report	Safe D	November 1, 2010
Rothenberg	Safe D	November 1, 2010
Sabato's Crystal Ball	Safe D	November 1, 2010
RCP	Safe D	November 1, 2010
CQ Politics	Safe D	October 28, 2010
New York Times	Safe D	November 1, 2010
FiveThirtyEight	Safe D	November 1, 2010

=== General election results ===
North Carolina's 12th district general election, November 2, 2010
Party	Candidate	Votes	%
Democratic	Mel Watt (incumbent)	103,495	63.88
Republican	Greg Dority	55,315	34.14
Libertarian	Lon Cecil	3,197	1.97
Total votes		162,007	100.00

== District 13 ==
2010 North Carolina's 13th congressional district election

Nominee	Bill Randall	Bernie Reeves
Party	Republican	Republican
Popular vote	3,807	2,655
Percentage	58.9%	41.1%
U.S. Representative before election
Brad Miller
Democratic
Elected U.S. Representative
Bill Randall
Republican

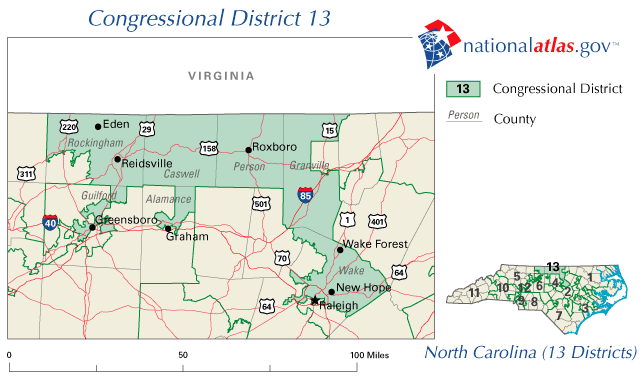
North Carolina's 13th congressional district in 2010

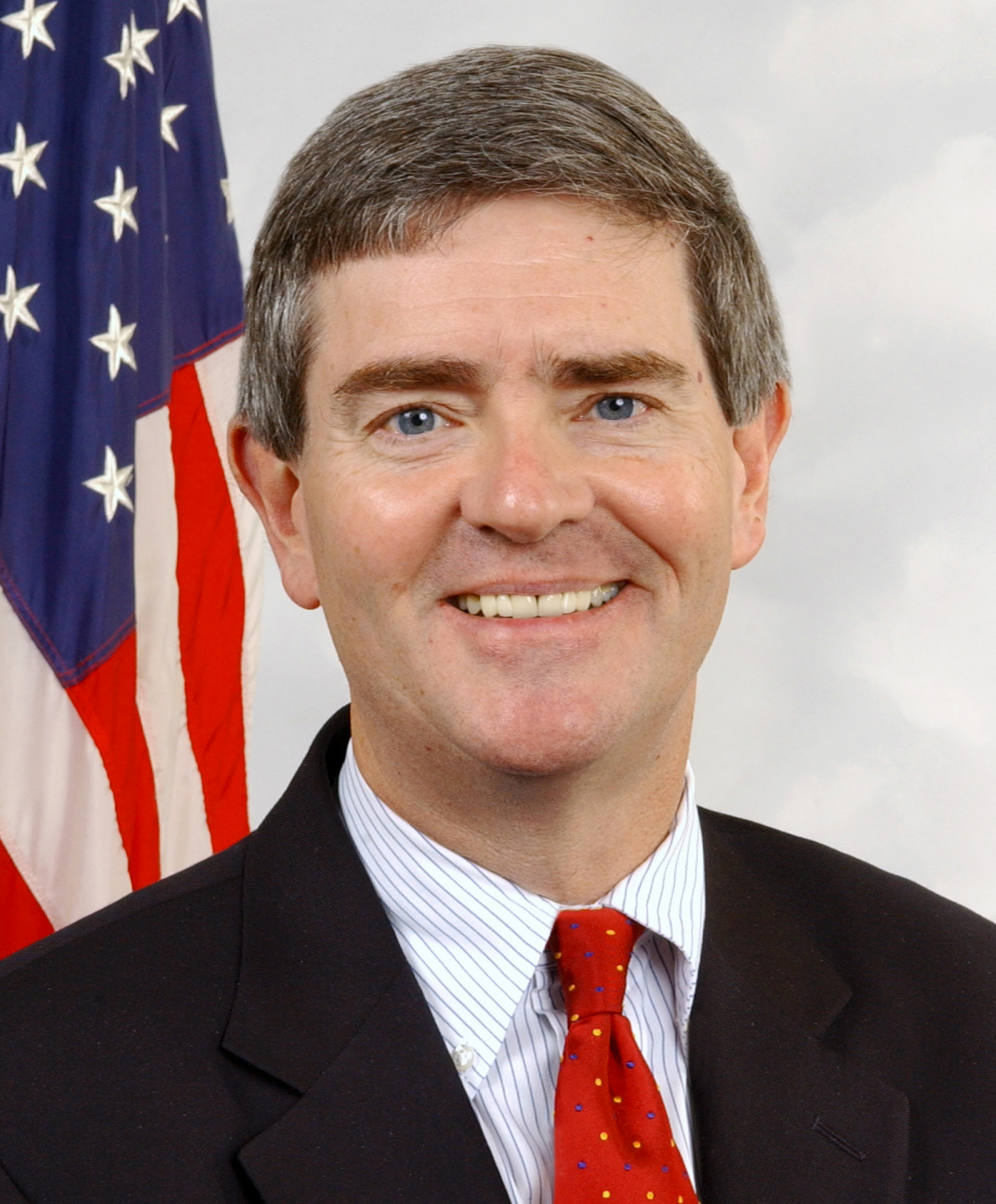
Brad Miller, who was re-elected as the U.S. representative for the 13th district

The 13th district included parts of Greensboro, Raleigh and Wake Forest. The district's population was 59 percent white, 28 percent black and 9 percent Hispanic (see race and ethnicity in the United States census); 84 percent were high school graduates and 30 percent had received a bachelor's degree or higher. Its median income was $46,900. In the 2008 presidential election the district gave 59 percent of its vote to Democratic nominee Barack Obama and 40 percent to Republican nominee John McCain.

Democrat Brad Miller, who took office in 2003, was the incumbent. Miller was re-elected in 2008 with 66 percent of the vote. In 2010 Miller's opponent in the general election was Republican nominee Bill Randall, a U.S. Navy retiree. Miller was unopposed in the Democratic primary. Dan Huffman, an engineer and business owner; Frank Hurley, a retired aerospace engineer; and Bernie Reeves, a magazine publisher, also sought the Republican nomination.

Miller raised $930,351 and spent $899,442. Randall raised $200,449 and spent $198,055. Huffman raised $42,257 and spent the same amount. Reeves raised $277,361 and spent $275,366.

Prior to the election FiveThirtyEight's forecast gave Miller a 99 percent chance of winning and projected that he would receive 60 percent of the vote. On election day Miller was re-elected with 55 percent of the vote to Randall's 45 percent. Miller retired rather than seeking re-election in 2012 and was succeeded by Republican George Holding.

=== Republican primary results ===
North Carolina's 13th district Republican primary, May 4, 2010
Party	Candidate	Votes	%
Republican	Bill Randall	5,738	32.59
Republican	Bernie Reeves	5,603	31.83
Republican	Dan Huffman	4,749	26.98
Republican	Frank Hurley	1,515	8.61
Total votes		17,605	100.00

=== Republican primary runoff results ===
North Carolina's 13th district Republican primary runoff, June 22, 2010
Party	Candidate	Votes	%
Republican	Bill Randall	3,807	58.91
Republican	Bernie Reeves	2,655	41.09
Total votes		6,462	100.00

==== Predictions ====
Source	Ranking	As of
The Cook Political Report	Safe D	November 1, 2010
Rothenberg	Safe D	November 1, 2010
Sabato's Crystal Ball	Safe D	November 1, 2010
RCP	Likely D	November 1, 2010
CQ Politics	Safe D	October 28, 2010
New York Times	Safe D	November 1, 2010
FiveThirtyEight	Safe D	November 1, 2010

=== General election results ===
North Carolina's 13th district general election, November 2, 2010
Party	Candidate	Votes	%
Democratic	Brad Miller (incumbent)	116,103	55.50
Republican	Bill Randall	93,099	44.50
Total votes		209,202	100.00

== See also ==
- List of United States representatives from North Carolina
- North Carolina's congressional delegations
