= Harold Johnson (sportscaster) =

American journalist (born c.1941)

- Born: c. 1941 (age 84–85); Camden, New Jersey, U.S.
- Education: Lenoir-Rhyne College
- Occupation: Sportscaster
- Political party: Republican
- Spouse: Linda Johnson (deceased)
- Children: 3

Harold Johnson (born c. 1941) is an American sportscaster. He was sports director for WSOC-TV in Charlotte, North Carolina for 26 years, during which time he won four Emmy Awards and was nominated for two others. He was the 2010 Republican nominee for North Carolina's 8th congressional district.

== Early life, education and career ==
Johnson was born in Camden, New Jersey and moved to North Carolina in 1958. He graduated from Statesville Senior High School, and received an economics degree from Lenoir-Rhyne College in Hickory, North Carolina. He also served in the United States Marine Corps at Camp LeJeune.

== Career as sportscaster ==
Johnson started his broadcast career at WSIC radio in Statesville, where he hosted a music program called "The HaJo Show". While at WSIC, he met Jim Thacker of WBTV, where he acted as weekend sports anchor and later worked nights. On WBT, he was morning co-host with Bob Lacey and the play-by-play announcer and pre-game host for the Charlotte Hornets of the World Football League. He also covered the Masters Golf Tournament for ABC radio.

Late in 1979, Johnson moved to WSOC-TV. In 1980, Johnson became the station's sports director. During his 26 years there, "The Big Guy" covered the NBA Hornets and Bobcats, NASCAR, the NFL Carolina Panthers, and college basketball teams from North Carolina that reached the Final Four.

In 1990, 1992, 1994, and 1995, Johnson received the Outstanding Sportscasting Emmy. He was also nominated in 1997 and 1999. Johnson also played a role in moving WSOC-TV from a distant second in the TV news ratings to first place. He was also noted for being the first to announce that Charlotte had its first NBA team, and he once had to break into regular programming to announce a regular news bulletin.

In 2000, Sports Illustrated referred to Johnson as "the dean of Charlotte sportscasters" who had become "an expert in broadcasting sports sorrow"; the magazine listed the many tragedies he was known for reporting, including the deaths of Kenny Irwin, Fred Lane, Adam Petty and Bobby Phills. Other events included the murder trial of Rae Carruth, the sexual assault trial of George Shinn, and other legal troubles facing the area's major sports figures.

Johnson retired from WSOC in 2006 to spend more time with his family.

In 2009, The Charlotte Observer named Johnson as number one on the newspaper's list of top sportscasters in Charlotte. Langston Wertz Jr. said "His 'big guy' persona was ESPN before there was ESPN."

== Political activity ==
Johnson is a Republican. In 1986, he was asked to host a rally at Charlotte/Douglas International Airport during a visit by then-President Ronald Reagan. He also has a "deep-rooted" Christian faith. In a 2018 interview, Johnson described his political views as socially liberal and fiscally conservative, and also voiced his support for then-President Donald Trump.

=== 2010 congressional campaign ===
On December 4, 2009, at age 68, Johnson announced he would run against Democratic Representative Larry Kissell in North Carolina's 8th congressional district. His reasons for running included high unemployment and numerous closed factories, as well as the overall state of the country. He said, "I speak from the heart... this isn't the America I know." He said House Speaker Nancy Pelosi led Democrats "off a cliff". Johnson also criticized "big government spending" and "absence of leadership". To create jobs, he hoped to lower taxes and offer incentives. He officially filed as a candidate on February 23, 2010. Though he had less money to spend than some of his five Republican competitors, and he was new to the district, Johnson hoped to take advantage of his familiarity to TV viewers in the western part of the district, which stretches from Concord to Fayetteville.

On May 4, 2010, Johnson received 33 percent of the vote compared to 37 percent for Tim D'Annunzio; he then defeated D'Annunzio by 22 points in a bitterly contested runoff on June 22, 2010.

Late polling in the general election showed Johnson within a point of Kissell, and several experts called the race a tossup. Ultimately, Kissell was reelected fairly convincingly, taking 53 percent of the vote to Johnson's 44 percent.

== Later broadcast career ==
As of 2018, Johnson co-hosted a morning show on WSIC in Statesville, he has since retired.

== Personal life ==
Johnson lives in Statesville, North Carolina. During his 2010 congressional campaign, he temporarily moved to Concord.

Johnson was married to his wife, Linda, for 44 years, until her death from cancer. They have three children.

== Electoral history ==
2010 election in North Carolina's 8th congressional district
Party	Candidate	Votes	%
Democratic	Larry Kissell (incumbent)	88,776	53.02
Republican	Harold Johnson	73,129	43.67
Libertarian	Thomas Hill	5,098	3.04
Write-In	Write-in candidates	439	0.26
Total votes		167,442	100.00
