= Richard Hudson (American politician) =

American politician (born 1971)

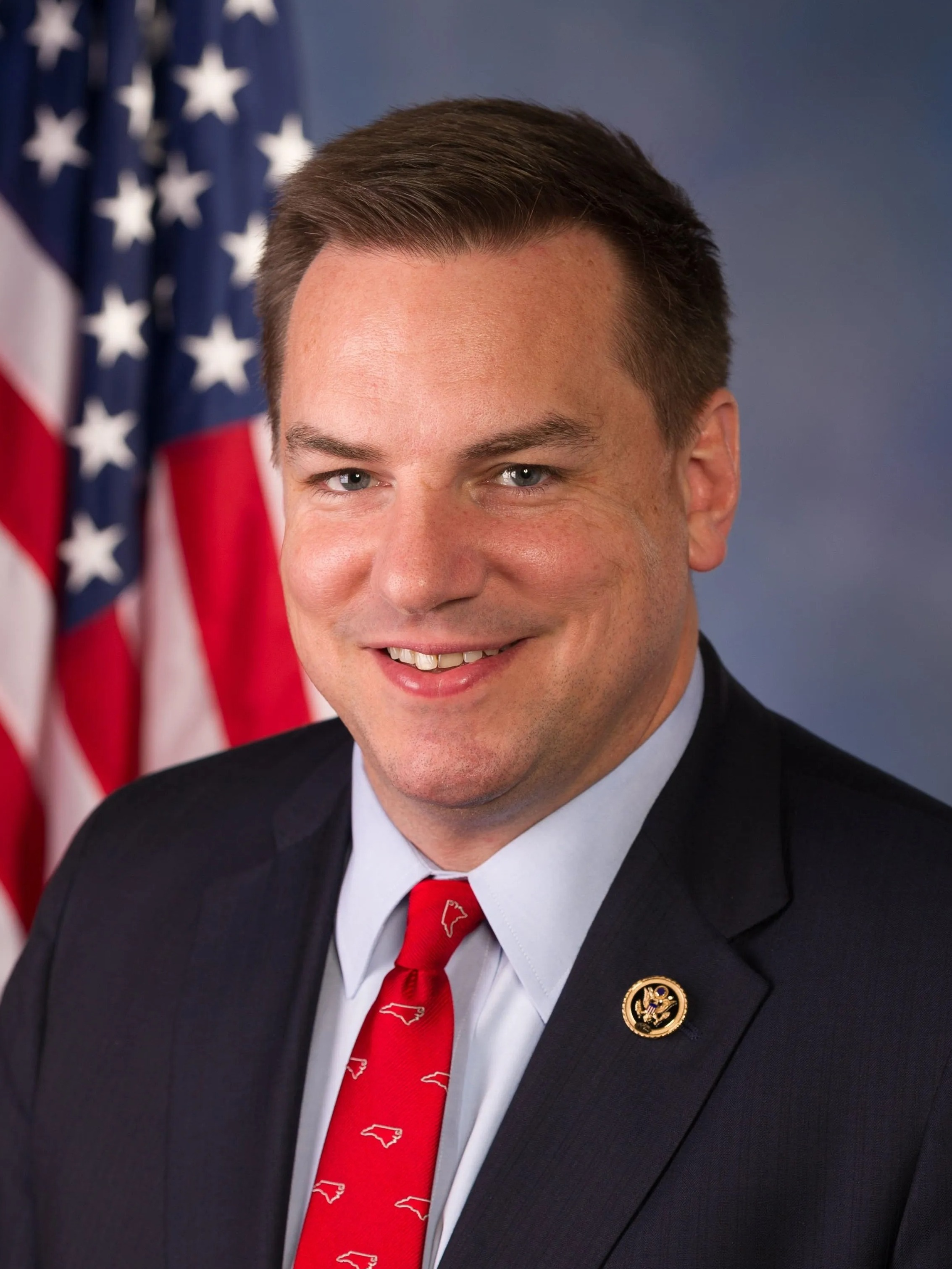
- Official portrait, 2016

Chair of the National Republican Congressional Committee
- Incumbent
- Assumed office January 3, 2023
- Leader: Kevin McCarthy; Mike Johnson
- Preceded by: Tom Emmer

Secretary of the House Republican Conference
- In office January 3, 2021 – January 3, 2023
- Leader: Kevin McCarthy
- Preceded by: Jason Smith
- Succeeded by: Lisa McClain

Member of the U.S. House of Representatives from North Carolina
- Incumbent
- Assumed office January 3, 2013
- Preceded by: Larry Kissell
- Constituency: 8th district (2013–2023); 9th district (2023–present)

Personal details
- Born: Richard Lane Hudson Jr. November 4, 1971 (age 55) Franklin, Virginia, U.S.
- Party: Republican
- Spouse: Renee Howell (m. 2010)
- Children: 1
- Education: University of North Carolina, Charlotte (BA)
- Website: House website Campaign website
- Hudson's voice Hudson supporting the SOUND Disposal and Packaging Act. Recorded June 19, 2018

Richard Lane Hudson Jr. (born November 4, 1971) is an American politician serving as the U.S. representative for North Carolina's 9th congressional district since 2013 (previously numbered the 8th district). A member of the Republican Party, his district covers a large part of the southern Piedmont area from Concord to Spring Lake.

Hudson was first elected to Congress in 2012, defeating Democratic incumbent Larry Kissell. He was re-elected every two years until 2026, losing to Democrat Richard Ojeda in the general election. During his time in Congress, Hudson served as head of the National Republican Congressional Committee during the 2024 and 2026 elections.

== Early life and education ==
Hudson was born in Franklin, Virginia, but has lived in the Charlotte area since childhood. He graduated from Myers Park High School in 1990. He attended the University of North Carolina at Charlotte and graduated Omicron Delta Kappa in 1996 with a Bachelor of Arts in political science and history. He also served as student body president and president of the College Republicans and was a member of the Kappa Alpha Order social fraternity.

== Early career ==
Active in politics for many years, Hudson served as district director for 8th District Congressman Robin Hayes from 1999 to 2005. At various times, he served on the staffs of Republicans Virginia Foxx, John Carter and Mike Conaway. He also served as communications director for the North Carolina Republican Party in the mid-1990s. In 1996 he worked on Richard Vinroot's campaign for governor, and in 2008 as campaign manager for Pat McCrory's run for governor. Hudson was the president of Cabarrus Marketing Group, a small business consulting and marketing company he started in 2011 and dissolved upon his election to Congress.

== U.S. House of Representatives ==
=== Elections ===
2012

Hudson ran for Congress in North Carolina's 8th congressional district. He won the July 17 Republican primary runoff with 64% of the vote against Scott Keadle and faced Democratic incumbent Larry Kissell in November. The district had been made significantly more Republican in redistricting, losing most of its share of Charlotte and picking up several heavily Republican areas northeast of the city.

At a primary campaign event in April 2012, Hudson told a Tea Party group, "there's no question President Obama is hiding something on his citizenship." He later apologized for his comments and said he accepted that Obama was born in the United States.

Hudson spoke at the 2012 Republican National Convention in Tampa, Florida, on August 28, 2012. He was elected with 54% of the vote to Kissell's 46% and took office in January 2013.

North Carolina's 8th congressional district, 2012
Party	Candidate	Votes	%
Republican	Richard Hudson	160,695	53.2
Democratic	Larry Kissell (incumbent)	137,139	45.4
Independent	Antonio Blue (write-in)	3,990	1.3
n/a	Write-ins	456	0.1
Total votes		302,280	100.0
Republican gain from Democratic			

2014

Hudson was opposed by Antonio Blue in the general election and won 64.9% to 35.1%.

2016

In 2016, Hudson was challenged by Tim D'Annunzio in the primary election. He won with 64.6% of the vote to D'Annunzio's 35.4%. In the general election, Hudson defeated Democrat Thomas Mills 58.8%–41.2%.

2018

North Carolina's 8th congressional district, 2018
Party	Candidate	Votes	%
Republican	Richard Hudson (incumbent)	141,402	55.3
Democratic	Frank McNeill	114,119	44.7
Total votes		255,521	100.0
Republican hold			

2020

Hudson defeated Democrat Patricia Timmons-Goodson in the November 3 general election.

2022

North Carolina's 9th congressional district, 2022
Party	Candidate	Votes	%
Republican	Richard Hudson (incumbent)	131,453	56.50
Democratic	Ben Clark	101,202	43.50
Total votes		232,655	100.0
Republican hold			

2024

2024 North Carolina's 9th congressional district election
Party	Candidate	Votes	%
Republican	Richard Hudson (incumbent)	210,042	56.3
Democratic	Nigel William Bristow	140,852	37.8
Independent	Shelane Etchison	22,183	5.9
Total votes		373,077	100.0
Republican hold			

2026

Richard Hudson lost as the incumbent to Richard Ojeda in an upset victory.

=== Committee assignments ===
At the beginning of the 116th Congress, Hudson was assigned to the Committee on Energy and Commerce, Subcommittee on Energy, Subcommittee on Health and Subcommittee on Consumer Protection and Commerce.

=== Caucus membership ===
- Republican Study Committee
- Rare Disease Caucus
- Congressional Caucus on Turkey and Turkish Americans

=== Tenure ===
According to The Sandhills Sentinel, Hudson holds a conservative position on gun control, opposes abortion, and has been "a leading advocate of opioid reform."

Hudson sponsored a bill to improve airport security in reaction to the 2013 Los Angeles International Airport shooting. Representative John Katko reintroduced the bill, which became law in the 114th Congress.

In 2014, Hudson proposed prohibiting EPA officials from using airplane travel for official travel.

In December 2020, Hudson was one of 126 Republican members of the House of Representatives to sign an amicus brief in support of Texas v. Pennsylvania, a lawsuit filed at the United States Supreme Court contesting the results of the 2020 presidential election, in which Joe Biden defeated Trump. The Supreme Court declined to hear the case on the basis that Texas lacked standing under Article III of the Constitution to challenge the results of an election held by another state.

On January 6, 2021, Hudson was one of 147 Republican lawmakers who objected to the certification of electoral votes from the 2020 presidential election after a crowd of Trump supporters stormed the U.S. Capitol and forced an emergency recess of Congress. On May 19, 2021, Hudson and all seven other House Republican leaders voted against establishing a national commission to investigate the January 6, 2021, attack on the United States Capitol Complex. Thirty-five Republican House members and all 217 Democrats present voted to establish such a commission.

In March 2025, amid public opposition to the Elon Musk-led Department of Government Efficiency's sweeping spending cuts and other Trump administration policies, Hudson instructed fellow Republican members of Congress to stop holding town halls.

== Political positions ==
=== LGBTQ rights ===
In 2015, Hudson cosponsored a resolution to amend the Constitution to ban same-sex marriage. He voted against the Respect for Marriage Act in both July and December 2022. In early 2026, he urged fellow Republican politicians to continue to campaign on opposing same-sex marriage, noting, "...some of these other issues are very important to key pieces of our base; it’s important to pay attention to those."

=== Healthcare ===
Hudson favors repealing the Affordable Care Act and has voted to repeal it.

=== Foreign policy ===
Hudson supported President Donald Trump's 2017 executive order to impose a temporary ban on entry to the U.S. to citizens of seven Muslim-majority countries, saying, "At a time of grave security threats, President Trump is right to pause the flow of refugees from countries where terrorism is rampant until we can properly vet them and implement additional screening for individuals traveling to and from these countries."

==== Israel and Gaza ====
Hudson supports Israel's war in Gaza. He supported President Trump's 2025 proposal to send U.S. troops to take control of Gaza and remove the Gazans from the territory.

=== Immigration ===
Hudson voted in favor of S.5, the Laken Riley Act. The bill would require the Secretary of Homeland Security to detain undocumented immigrants who are charged with theft, burglary, or shoplifting.

=== Guns ===
Hudson opposes red flag laws, which allow courts to remove firearms from individuals deemed a threat to themselves or others.

== Personal life ==
Hudson with his wife and son

Hudson's wife, Renee, was chief of staff for Kellyanne Conway. Hudson attends Crossroads Church (Concord, North Carolina), which is a Global Methodist Church congregation.

== Electoral history ==
North Carolina's 8th congressional district, 2012
Party	Candidate	Votes	%
Republican	Richard Hudson	160,695	53.2
Democratic	Larry Kissell (incumbent)	137,139	45.4
Independent	Antonio Blue (write-in)	3,990	1.3
Write-in		456	0.1
Total votes		302,280	100.0
Republican gain from Democratic			

North Carolina's 8th congressional district, 2014
Party	Candidate	Votes	%
Republican	Richard Hudson (incumbent)	121,568	64.9
Democratic	Antonio Blue	65,854	35.1
Total votes		187,422	100.0
Republican hold			

North Carolina's 8th congressional district, 2016
Party	Candidate	Votes	%
Republican	Richard Hudson (incumbent)	16,375	64.6
Republican	Tim D'Annunzio	8,943	35.4
Total votes		25,248	100.0
Republican hold			

North Carolina's 8th congressional district, 2018
Party	Candidate	Votes	%
Republican	Richard Hudson (incumbent)	141,402	55.3
Democratic	Frank McNeill	114,119	44.7
Total votes		255,521	100.0
Republican hold			

North Carolina's 8th congressional district, 2020
Party	Candidate	Votes	%
Republican	Richard Hudson (incumbent)	202,774	53.3
Democratic	Patricia Timmons-Goodson	177,781	46.7
Total votes		380,555	100.0
Republican hold			

North Carolina's 9th congressional district, 2022
Party	Candidate	Votes	%
Republican	Richard Hudson (incumbent)	131,453	56.5
Democratic	Ben Clark	101,202	43.5
Total votes		232,655	100.0
Republican hold			

North Carolina's 9th congressional district, 2024
Party	Candidate	Votes	%
Republican	Richard Hudson (incumbent)	210,042	56.3
Democratic	Nigel William Bristow	140,852	37.8
Independent	Shelane Etchison	22,183	5.9
Total votes		373,077	100.0
Republican hold			

U.S. House of Representatives
Preceded by Larry Kissell	Member of the U.S. House of Representatives from North Carolina's 8th congressional district 2013–2023	Succeeded by Dan Bishop
Preceded by Dan Bishop	Member of the U.S. House of Representatives from North Carolina's 9th congressional district 2023–present	Incumbent
Party political offices
Preceded by Jason Smith	Secretary of the House Republican Conference; 2021–2023	Succeeded by Lisa McClain
Preceded by Tom Emmer	Chair of the National Republican Congressional Committee; 2023–present	Incumbent
U.S. order of precedence (ceremonial)
Preceded by Lois Frankel	United States representatives by seniority 104th	Succeeded by Jared Huffman
