= Larry Kissell =

American politician (born 1951)

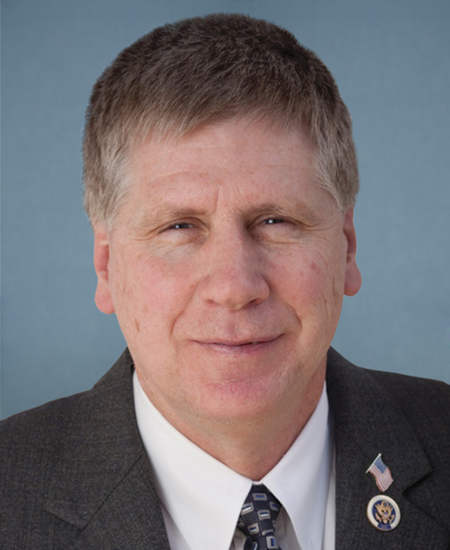

Member of the U.S. House of Representatives from North Carolina's 8th district
- In office January 3, 2009 – January 3, 2013
- Preceded by: Robin Hayes
- Succeeded by: Richard Hudson

Personal details
- Born: Lawrence Webb Kissell; January 31, 1951 (age 75) Biscoe, North Carolina, U.S.
- Party: Democratic
- Spouse: Tina Eberly
- Education: Wake Forest University (BA)

Lawrence Webb Kissell (born January 31, 1951) is an American politician who served as the U.S. representative for North Carolina's 8th congressional district, a district that stretched from Charlotte to Fayetteville. A member of the Democratic Party, he served from 2009 to 2013. In 2012, Kissell lost re-election to Richard Hudson, his Republican opponent.

== Early life, education, and early career ==
Kissell is a lifelong resident of Biscoe, a small town roughly halfway between Charlotte and Fayetteville. He graduated from Wake Forest University in 1973 with a degree in economics.

After a brief stint as a manager at Union Carbide, Kissell worked at a hosiery factory for 27 years, rising to production manager. After growing concerned about the effects of the North American Free Trade Agreement on the textile industry, he resigned his job at the hosiery plant in 2001 and took a job as a social studies teacher at his former high school, East Montgomery High School. As it turned out, the plant closed in 2003.

== U.S. House of Representatives ==
=== Elections ===
2006

In October 2006, Kissell ran for the Democratic nomination in the 8th District and won a four-way primary with 53 percent of the vote.

In the 2006 elections, Kissell faced four-term Republican Robin Hayes, who had surprised many pundits with his ability to hold onto what was thought to be a marginally Democratic district. The outcome of the November 2006 general election was in doubt for several weeks, as recounts had to be conducted due to the close margin. Kissell officially wound up losing by 329 votes. He won six of the district's nine counties, but ultimately could not overcome a 6,100-vote deficit in Cabarrus County, home to Hayes. Kissell conceded the race on November 29, 2006 and immediately announced plans to run again in 2008.

2008

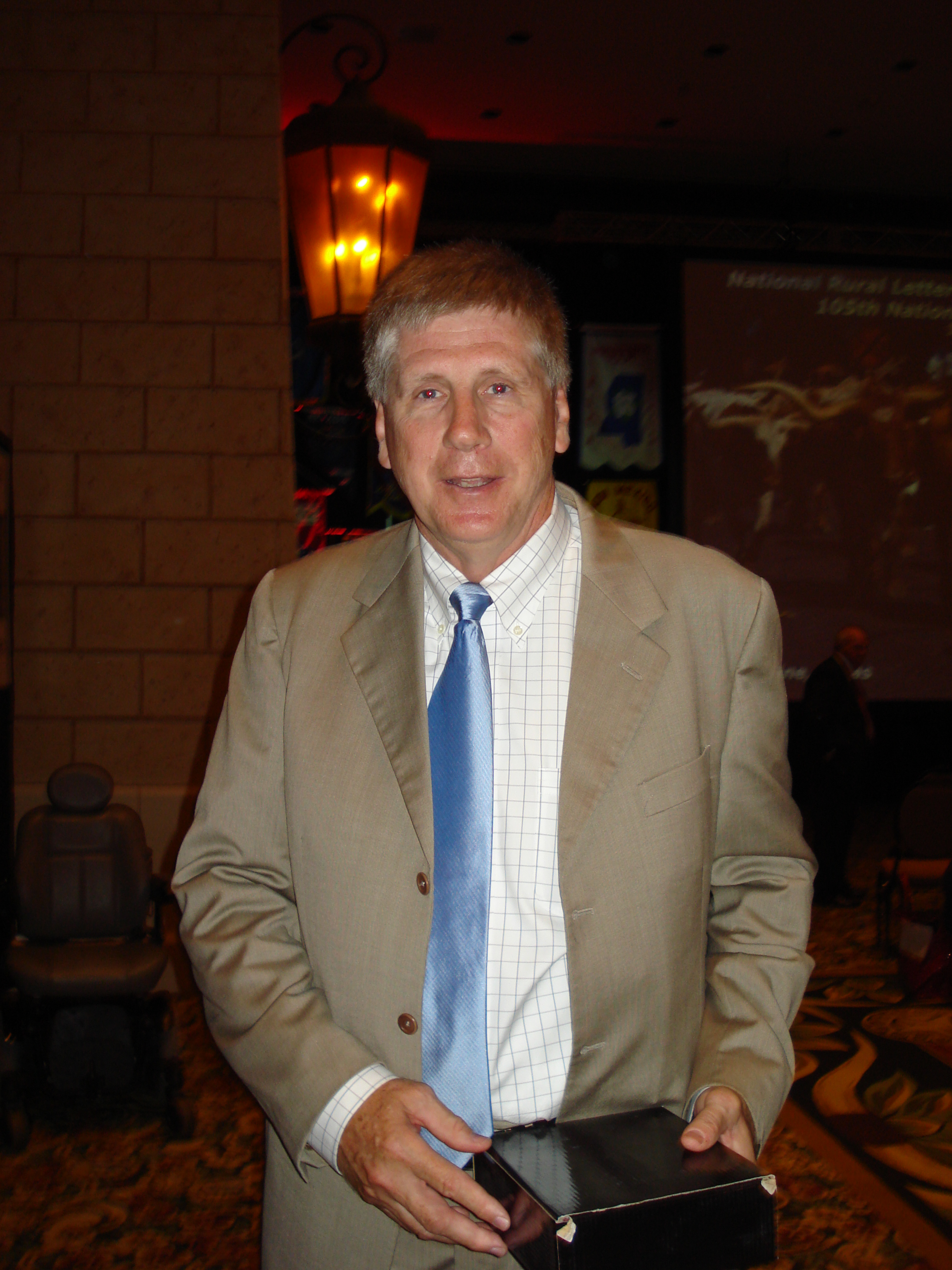
Kissell in 2009

After Kissell's near victory in 2006, which fed on the strength of grass-roots support and a vigorous internet campaign, the Democratic Congressional Campaign Committee supported his campaign in 2008. Questions about the way Kissell ran his 2006 campaign were raised when it was revealed that he had paid no employment taxes and social security on his campaign workers. He remains in arrears to some workers that he released from the campaign for as much as $15,000. He later stated that the workers were "volunteers," although at least one employee holds a document, signed by Kissell, that states the amount that was to be paid monthly. One constituent, Gail Vowel of Harrisburg was quoted as saying, "she'd never vote for Kissell after hearing he didn't pay Social Security and unemployment taxes for about a dozen campaign workers, one of Hayes' biggest attacks of Kissell. Kissell says his 2006 campaign used contract workers, and that he's paying all required taxes for his full-time employees in this campaign, a statement that remains in question.

In the November election, Kissell defeated Hayes by a larger-than-expected margin, according to unofficial results. He won 55 percent of the vote to Hayes' 45 percent. This victory returned the seat to the Democrats; Bill Hefner had held the seat for 24 years before Hayes won it in 1998.

2010

Kissell faced Republican challenger Harold Johnson, a longtime sportscaster at WSOC-TV in Charlotte. The Service Employees International Union, which supported Kissell in 2008, drafted independent candidate Wendell Fant to replace Kissell due to his stance on health care reform. Although some polls showed the race within a point, Kissell ultimately took 53 percent of the vote to Johnson's 44 percent.

2012

Redistricting in 2011 made Kissell's district considerably more Republican. It lost most of its share of Charlotte and all of its share of Fayetteville, while picking up most of the heavily Republican western section of Union County that had been cut out after the 2000 census. It also picked up several heavily Republican counties east of Charlotte. Kissell faced Republican nominee Richard Hudson. Kissell was faced with backlash from progressives within his party over support of some House Republican policies, lost some African-American support, and lost the general election on November 6, 2012 to Republican challenger Richard Hudson.

=== Tenure ===
Kissell's first act in Congress was to co-sponsor a bill to reverse a planned Congressional pay raise. On February 13, 2009, Dan Eggen and Ellen Nakashima of the Washington Post wrote that the compromise stimulus bill included a provision introduced by Kissell that would; "require the Transportation Security Administration to purchase uniforms manufactured in the United States; most TSA clothing is currently assembled in Mexico and Honduras from U.S.-made fabric." In March 2010, Kissell voted against the Patient Protection and Affordable Care Act, saying, "I kept my word." In January 2011, Kissell voted against repealing the law. His vote angered some constituents in his district; the Washington Post noted that a year after his election, "the euphoria has given way to second thoughts at best and outright rebellion at worst." Michael Lawson, an African-American Democratic leader from his constituency, stated the people believed they would receive one outcome and got another with his vote on health care. He explained the latter vote as follows: "let everybody vote, and then let's focus on the economy and get people back to work, because that's what the American people want us to do."

=== Committee assignments ===
- Committee on Agriculture'
  - Subcommittee on Rural Development, Research, Biotechnology, and Foreign Agriculture
- Committee on Armed Services
  - Subcommittee on Tactical Air and Land Forces
  - Subcommittee on Readiness

=== Caucus memberships ===
- Congressional Arts Caucus

== See also ==
- North Carolina Democratic Party

U.S. House of Representatives
Preceded by Robin Hayes	Member of the U.S. House of Representatives from North Carolina's 8th congressional district 2009–2013	Succeeded by Richard Hudson
U.S. order of precedence (ceremonial)
Preceded by Jamaal Bowman as Former U.S. Representative	Order of precedence of the United States as Former U.S. Representative	Succeeded by Dan Bishop as Former U.S. Representative
