= 2008 United States House of Representatives elections in North Carolina =

- November 4, 2008

All 13 North Carolina seats in the United States House of Representatives
	Majority party	Minority party
Party	Democratic	Republican
Last election	7	6
Seats won	8	5
Seat change	▲1	▼1
Popular vote	2,293,971	1,901,517
Percentage	54.42%	45.11%
Swing	▲1.51%	▼1.98%

Democratic
50–60%
60–70%
70–80%
80–90%
Republican
50–60%
60–70%
70–80%

The United States House of Representative elections of 2008 in North Carolina were held on November 4, 2008, as part of the biennial election to the United States House of Representatives. All thirteen seats in North Carolina, and 435 nationwide, were elected to the 111th United States Congress. The party primary elections were held on May 6, 2008.

Carried on the coattails of Barack Obama winning the state in the presidential election, the Democrats added one seat to their seven won in 2006. The Republican Party won the other five. In the 8th district, Democrat Larry Kissell defeated incumbent Robin Hayes. All other incumbents won re-election. The Republicans' hold on the 10th district had been thought to be at risk by CQ Politics, but Republican Patrick McHenry won re-election. The Democrats increased their total vote share by 1.5% statewide, and 2.5% if excluding the 1st, which the Republicans didn't contest in 2006.

It is not to be confused with the election to the North Carolina House of Representatives, which was held on the same day.

== Summary ==
District	Incumbent	2008 status	Democratic	Republican	Libertarian
1	G. K. Butterfield	Re-election	G. K. Butterfield	Dean Stephens	
2	Bob Etheridge	Re-election	Bob Etheridge	Dan Mansell	Will Adkins
3	Walter B. Jones Jr.	Re-election	Craig Weber	Walter B. Jones Jr.	
4	David Price	Re-election	David Price	B.J. Lawson	
5	Virginia Foxx	Re-election	Roy Carter	Virginia Foxx	
6	Howard Coble	Re-election	Teresa Sue Bratton	Howard Coble	
7	Mike McIntyre	Re-election	Mike McIntyre	Will Breazeale	
8	Robin Hayes	Defeated	Larry Kissell	Robin Hayes	
9	Sue Myrick	Re-election	Harry Taylor	Sue Myrick	Andy Grum
10	Patrick McHenry	Re-election	Daniel Johnson	Patrick McHenry	
11	Heath Shuler	Re-election	Heath Shuler	Carl Mumpower	Keith Smith
12	Mel Watt	Re-election	Mel Watt	Ty Cobb Jr.	
13	Brad Miller	Re-election	Brad Miller	Hugh Webster	

2008 United States House of Representative elections in North Carolina – Summary
Party	Seats	Gains	Losses	Net gain/loss	Seats %	Votes %	Votes	+/−
Democratic	8	1	0	+1	61.54	54.42	2,293,971	+1.51
Republican	5	0	1	−1	38.46	45.11	1,901,517	−1.98
Libertarian	0	0	0	±0	0.00	0.47	19,605	+0.47

== District 1 ==
2008 North Carolina's 1st congressional district election
- November 4, 2008
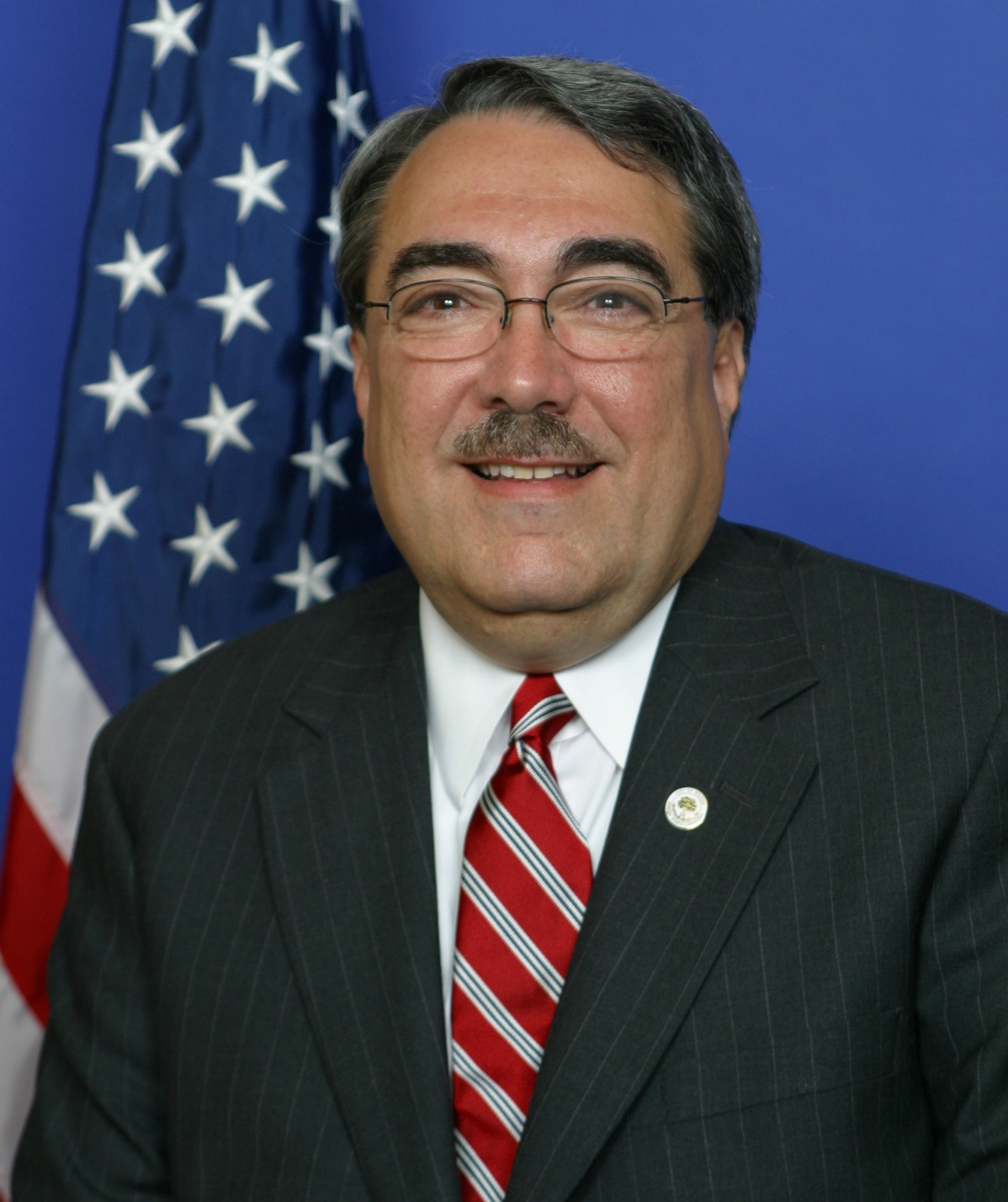

Nominee	G. K. Butterfield	Dean Stephens
Party	Democratic	Republican
Popular vote	192,765	81.506
Percentage	70.00%	30.00%
- County results Butterfield: 50–60% 60–70% 70–80% 80–90%
U.S. Representative before election
G. K. Butterfield
Democratic
Elected U.S. Representative
G. K. Butterfield
Democratic

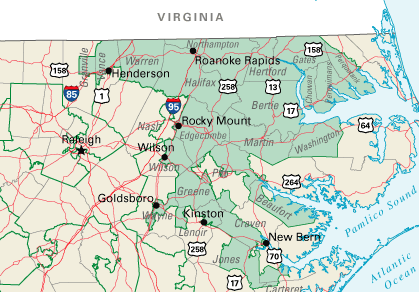

This district, located in the northeastern portion of the state, is represented by Democrat G. K. Butterfield, who first won it in a 2004 special election. It is the only majority-black district in the state, and is overwhelmingly Democratic (Cook Partisan Voting Index of D+9). It is one of the few districts in the former Confederacy that has not elected a Republican since the end of Reconstruction. Butterfield was opposed by Republican William A. "Dean" Stephens. CQ Politics forecasted the race as 'Safe Democrat'.

- Race ranking and details from CQ Politics
- Campaign contributions from OpenSecrets

=== Predictions ===
Source	Ranking	As of
The Cook Political Report	Safe D	November 6, 2008
Rothenberg	Safe D	November 2, 2008
Sabato's Crystal Ball	Safe D	November 6, 2008
Real Clear Politics	Safe D	November 7, 2008
CQ Politics	Safe D	November 6, 2008

2008 United States House of Representatives North Carolina 1st district election
Party	Candidate	Votes	%	±%
Democratic	G. K. Butterfield (incumbent)	192,765	70.28	−29.72
Republican	Dean Stephens	81,506	29.72	N/A
Turnout		274,271		

== District 2 ==
2008 North Carolina's 2nd congressional district election
- November 4, 2008
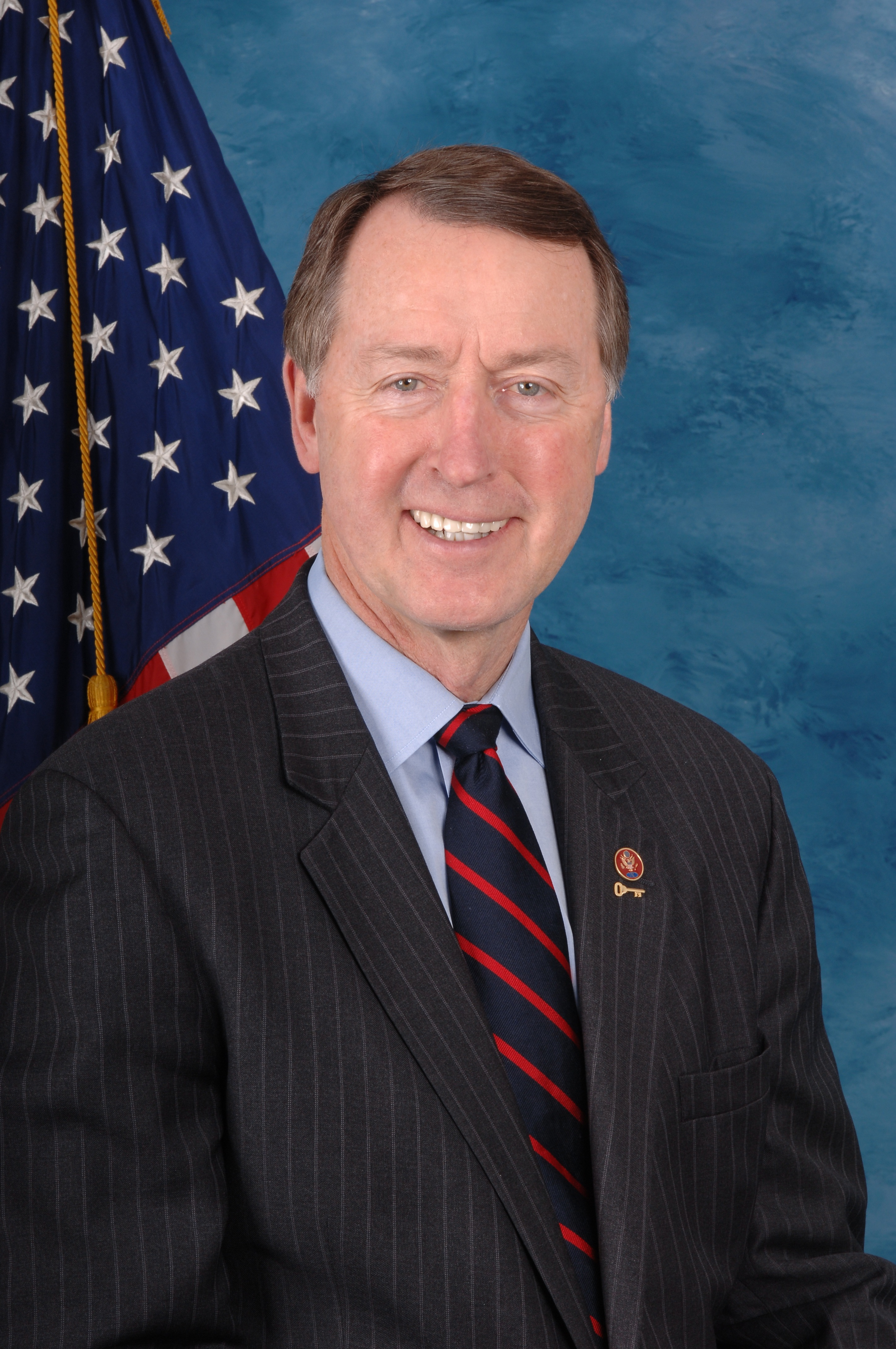

Nominee	Bob Etheridge	Dan Mansell
Party	Democratic	Republican
Popular vote	199,730	93,323
Percentage	66.93%	31.27%
- County results Etheridge: 50–60% 60–70% 70–80%
U.S. Representative before election
Bob Etheridge
Democratic
Elected U.S. Representative
Bob Etheridge
Democratic

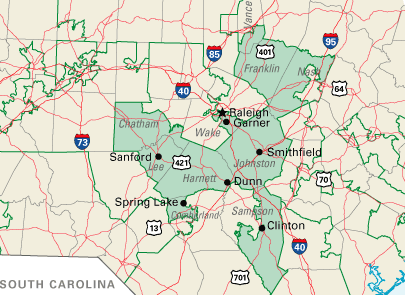

This district includes several suburban and rural areas near Raleigh, Rocky Mount and Fayetteville. It has been represented by Democrat Bob Etheridge since 1997. The district is a swing district on paper (CPVI of R+3); it narrowly supported Bill Clinton in 1992 and 1996, and gave equally narrow margins to George W. Bush in 2000 and 2004. However, Etheridge is very popular in this area. In 2008, he faced his 2006 opponent, Republican Dan Mansell, and Libertarian Will Adkins. CQ Politics forecasted the race as 'Safe Democrat'.

- Race ranking and details from CQ Politics
- Campaign contributions from OpenSecrets

=== Predictions ===
Source	Ranking	As of
The Cook Political Report	Safe D	November 6, 2008
Rothenberg	Safe D	November 2, 2008
Sabato's Crystal Ball	Safe D	November 6, 2008
Real Clear Politics	Safe D	November 7, 2008
CQ Politics	Safe D	November 6, 2008

2008 United States House of Representatives North Carolina 2nd district election
Party	Candidate	Votes	%	±%
Democratic	Bob Etheridge (incumbent)	199,730	66.93	+0.40
Republican	Dan Mansell	93,323	31.27	−2.20
Libertarian	Will Adkins	5,377	1.80	N/A
Turnout		298,430		

== District 3 ==
2008 North Carolina's 3rd congressional district election
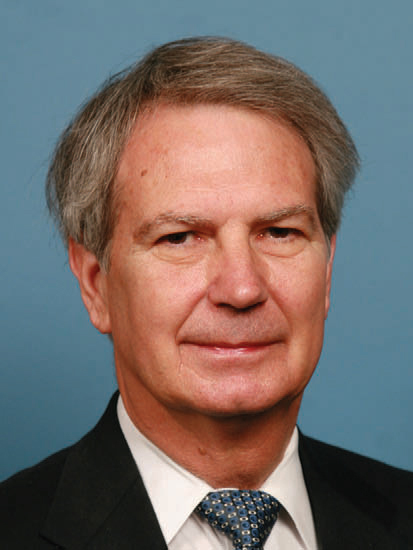

Nominee	Walter B. Jones Jr.	Craig Weber
Party	Republican	Democratic
Popular vote	201,686	104,364
Percentage	65.9%	34.1%
- County results Jones: 50–60% 60–70% 70–80%
U.S. Representative before election
Walter B. Jones Jr.
Republican
Elected U.S. Representative
Walter B. Jones Jr.
Republican

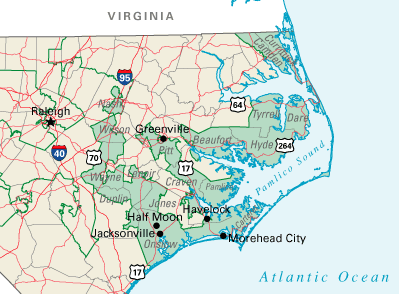

This district stretches along the northeastern and east-central portions of the state, including the Outer Banks. It has been represented by Republican Walter B. Jones Jr. since 1995. Although Democrats have a 14-point plurality of registered voters, Jones had long been thought to have an unbreakable hold on this district. Much of this area had been part of the 1st prior to 1993, and Jones's father, popular 14-term Democrat Walter B. Jones Sr., is still an icon in this region. However, Jones's voting record has shifted increasingly to the center for some time, and he has become one of the most vocal Republican opponents of the Iraq War. This has caused considerable chagrin among Republicans in his district. Onslow County Commissioner Joe McLaughlin announced in mid-2007 that he would challenge Jones in the Republican primary. Jones defeated McLaughlin in the May 6 primary, with about 60 percent of the vote. 2006 Democratic nominee Craig Weber won his party's primary over Marshall Adame, carrying about 70 percent of the vote. The district has a CPVI of R+15—a three-way statistical tie for the most Republican district in the state, making it a very difficult pickup for Democrats on paper. CQ Politics forecasted the race as 'Safe Republican'.

- Race ranking and details from CQ Politics
- Campaign contributions from OpenSecrets

=== Predictions ===
Source	Ranking	As of
The Cook Political Report	Safe R	November 6, 2008
Rothenberg	Safe R	November 2, 2008
Sabato's Crystal Ball	Safe R	November 6, 2008
Real Clear Politics	Safe R	November 7, 2008
CQ Politics	Safe R	November 6, 2008

2008 United States House of Representatives North Carolina 3rd district election
Party	Candidate	Votes	%	±%
Republican	Walter B. Jones Jr. (incumbent)	201,686	65.90	−2.74
Democratic	Craig Weber	104,364	34.10	+2.74
Turnout		306,050		

== District 4 ==
2008 North Carolina's 4th congressional district election
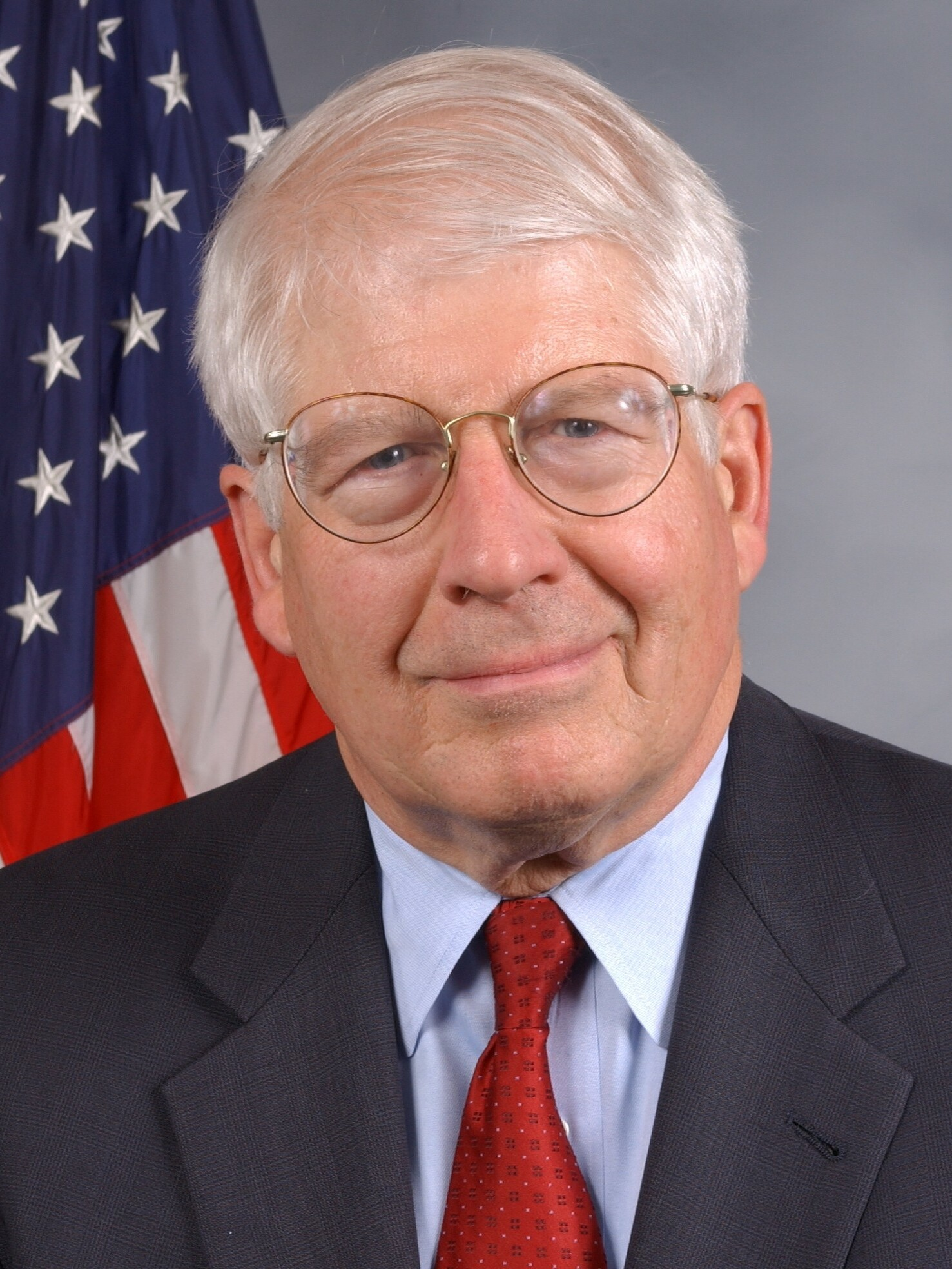

Nominee	David Price	B.J. Lawson
Party	Democratic	Republican
Popular vote	265,751	153,947
Percentage	63.3%	36.7%
- County results Price: 50–60% 60–70% 70–80%
U.S. Representative before election
David Price
Democratic
Elected U.S. Representative
David Price
Democratic

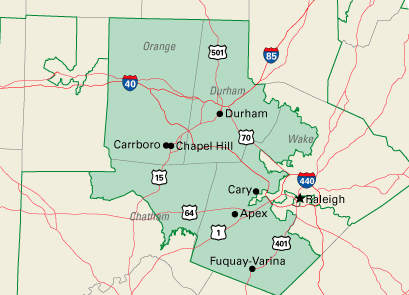

This district includes the heart of the Triangle area, including part of Raleigh and all of Durham and Chapel Hill, North Carolina. It has been represented by Democrat David Price since 1997 (he previously represented the 4th from 1987 to 1995). Despite a CPVI of only D+5, the influence of the state's three major research universities plus Price's status as an Appropriations subcommittee chairman (or "Cardinal") make Price a heavy favorite. Two Republicans competed in a May primary for the right to face Price: Augustus Cho and William (B.J.) Lawson. Lawson won, with about 70 percent of the vote. Libertarian Maximillian Longley also ran in the general election. CQ Politics forecasted the race as 'Safe Democrat'.

- Race ranking and details from CQ Politics
- Campaign contributions from OpenSecrets

=== Predictions ===
Source	Ranking	As of
The Cook Political Report	Safe D	November 6, 2008
Rothenberg	Safe D	November 2, 2008
Sabato's Crystal Ball	Safe D	November 6, 2008
Real Clear Politics	Safe D	November 7, 2008
CQ Politics	Safe D	November 6, 2008

2008 United States House of Representatives North Carolina 4th district election
Party	Candidate	Votes	%	±%
Democratic	David Price (incumbent)	265,751	63.32	−1.67
Republican	B.J. Lawson	153,947	36.68	+1.67
Turnout		419,698		

== District 5 ==
2008 North Carolina's 5th congressional district election
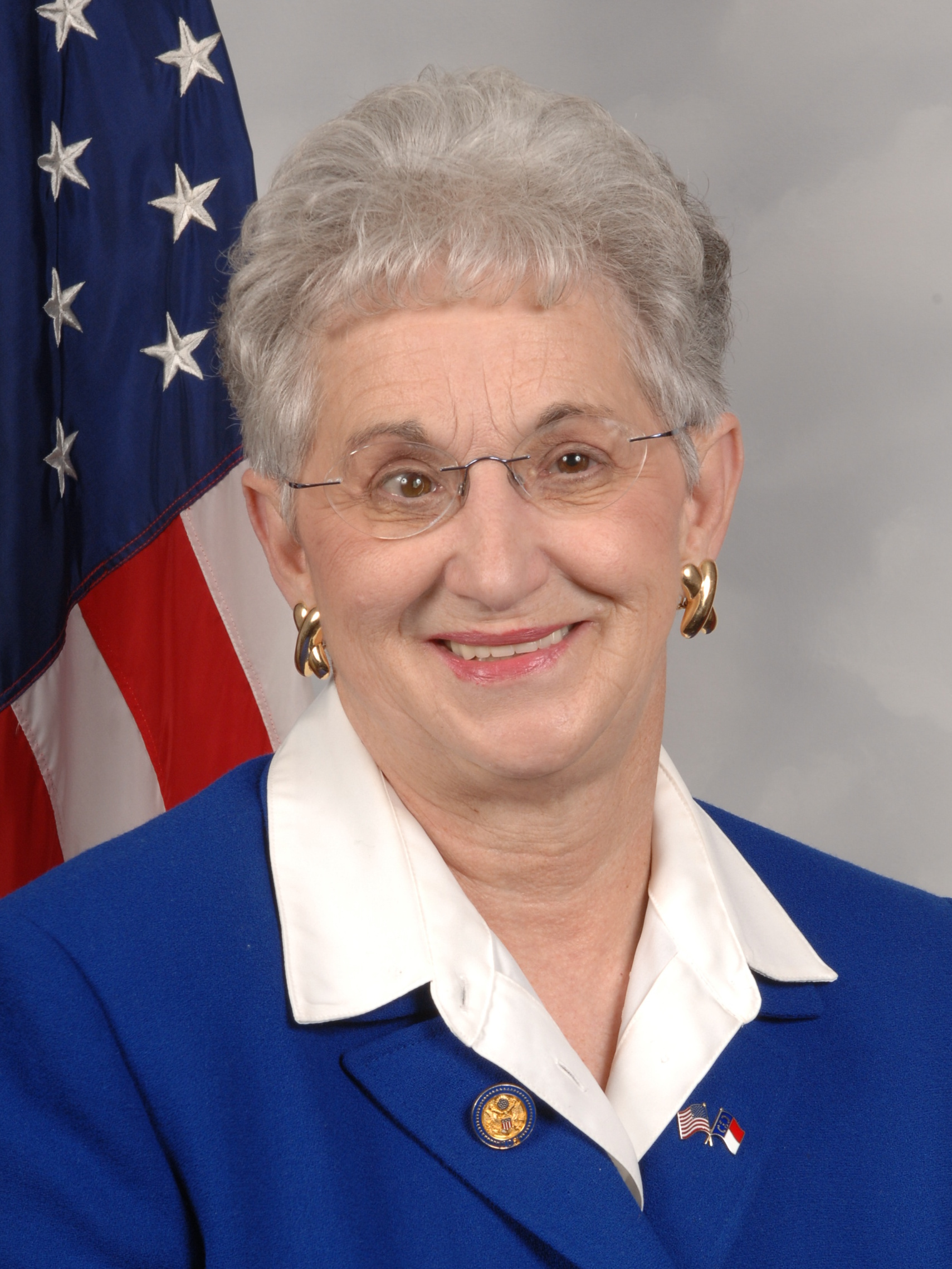

Nominee	Virginia Foxx	Roy Carter
Party	Republican	Democratic
Popular vote	190,820	136,103
Percentage	58.4%	41.6%
- County results Foxx: 50–60% 60–70% Carter: 50–60%
U.S. Representative before election
Virginia Foxx
Republican
Elected U.S. Representative
Virginia Foxx
Republican

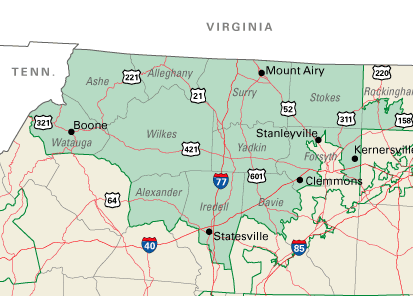

Democrats Roy Carter and Diane Hamby filed to run against incumbent Virginia Foxx. Carter won the May 6 primary, with just over 50 percent of the vote. CQ Politics forecasted the race as 'Safe Republican'.

- Race ranking and details from CQ Politics
- Campaign contributions from OpenSecrets

=== Predictions ===
Source	Ranking	As of
The Cook Political Report	Likely R	November 6, 2008
Rothenberg	Safe R	November 2, 2008
Sabato's Crystal Ball	Safe R	November 6, 2008
Real Clear Politics	Safe R	November 7, 2008
CQ Politics	Safe R	November 6, 2008

2008 United States House of Representatives North Carolina 5th district election
Party	Candidate	Votes	%	±%
Republican	Virginia Foxx (incumbent)	190,820	58.37	+1.21
Democratic	Roy Carter	136,103	41.63	−1.21
Turnout		326,923		

== District 6 ==
2008 North Carolina's 6th congressional district election
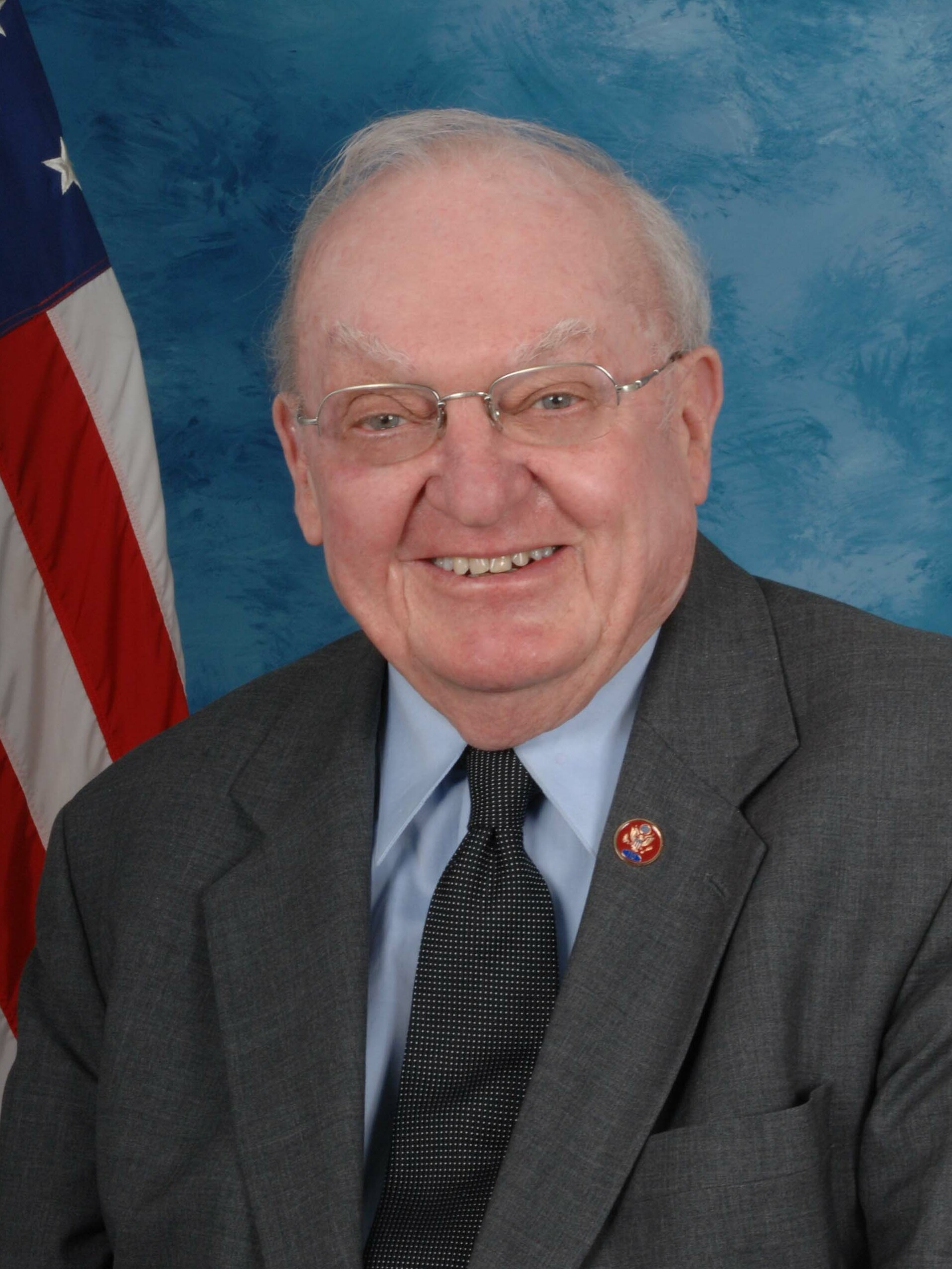

Nominee	Howard Coble	Teresa Sue Bratton
Party	Republican	Democratic
Popular vote	221,018	108,873
Percentage	67.0%	33.0%
- County results Coble: 60–70% 70–80%
U.S. Representative before election
Howard Coble
Republican
Elected U.S. Representative
Howard Coble
Republican

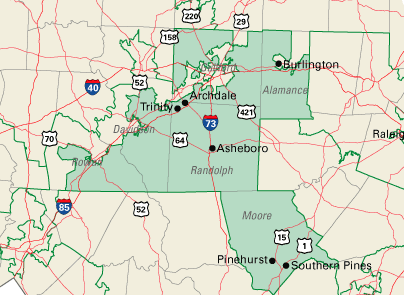

Democrats Johnny J. Carter, Jay Ovittore, and Teresa Sue Bratton (campaign website) filed to run against incumbent Howard Coble. Bratton won the May 6 primary, with 61 percent of the vote. CQ Politics forecasted the race as 'Safe Republican'.

- Race ranking and details from CQ Politics
- Campaign contributions from OpenSecrets

=== Predictions ===
Source	Ranking	As of
The Cook Political Report	Safe R	November 6, 2008
Rothenberg	Safe R	November 2, 2008
Sabato's Crystal Ball	Safe R	November 6, 2008
Real Clear Politics	Safe R	November 7, 2008
CQ Politics	Safe R	November 6, 2008

2008 United States House of Representatives North Carolina 6th district election
Party	Candidate	Votes	%	±%
Republican	Howard Coble (incumbent)	221,018	67.00	−3.83
Democratic	Teresa Sue Bratton	108,873	33.00	+3.83
Turnout		329,891		

== District 7 ==
2008 North Carolina's 7th congressional district election
- November 4, 2008
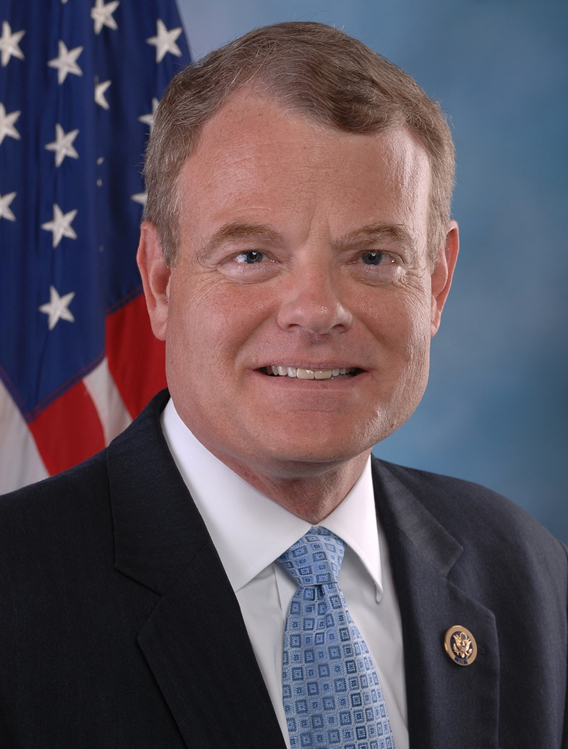

Nominee	Mike McIntyre	Will Breazeale
Party	Democratic	Republican
Popular vote	215,383	97,472
Percentage	68.8%	31.2%
- County results McIntyre: 50−60% 60−70% 70−80% 80−90%
U.S. Representative before election
Mike McIntyre
Democratic
Elected U.S. Representative
Mike McIntyre
Democratic

Republican Will Breazeale opposed incumbent Mike McIntyre. CQ Politics forecasted the race as 'Safe Democrat'.

- Race ranking and details from CQ Politics
- Campaign contributions from OpenSecrets

=== Predictions ===
Source	Ranking	As of
The Cook Political Report	Safe D	November 6, 2008
Rothenberg	Safe D	November 2, 2008
Sabato's Crystal Ball	Safe D	November 6, 2008
Real Clear Politics	Safe D	November 7, 2008
CQ Politics	Safe D	November 6, 2008

2008 United States House of Representatives North Carolina 7th district election
Party	Candidate	Votes	%	±%
Democratic	Mike McIntyre (incumbent)	215,383	68.84	−3.95
Republican	Will Breazeale	97,472	31.16	+3.95
Turnout		312,855		

== District 8 ==
2008 North Carolina's 8th congressional district election
- November 4, 2008
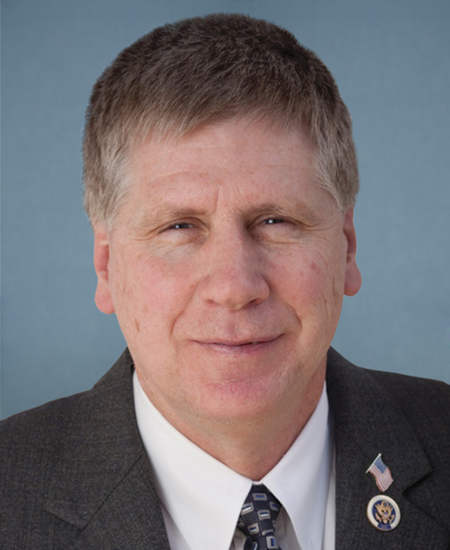

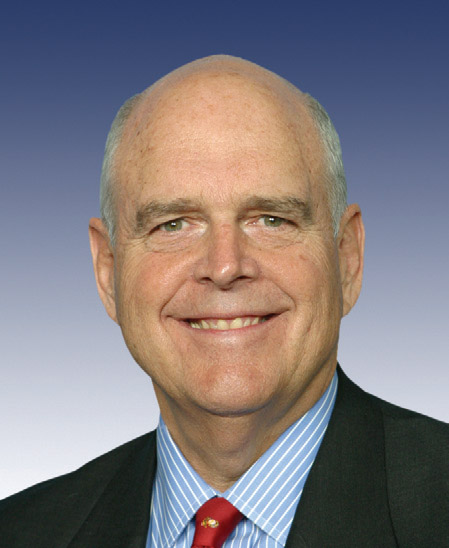
Nominee	Larry Kissell	Robin Hayes
Party	Democratic	Republican
Popular vote	157,180	126,634
Percentage	55.38%	44.62%
- County results Kissell: 50–60% 60–70% 70–80% Hayes: 50–60% 60–70%
U.S. Representative before election
Robin Hayes
Republican
Elected U.S. Representative
Larry Kissell
Democratic

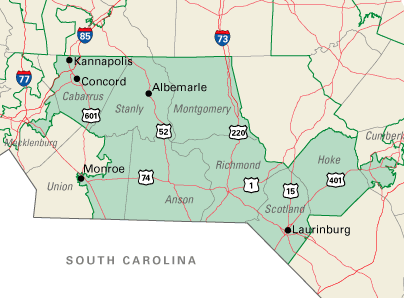

Democratic nominee Larry Kissell won against incumbent Robin Hayes, reversing the result from 2006 when Kissell came up only 329 votes short of upsetting Hayes. Libertarian Thomas Hill also ran. CQ Politics rated it as 'No Clear Favorite', The Rothenberg Political Report as 'Toss-Up/Tilt Democratic', and The Cook Political Report as 'Republican Toss Up'

- Race ranking and details from CQ Politics
- Campaign contributions from OpenSecrets
- Hayes (R-i) vs Kissell (D) graph of collected poll results from Pollster.com

=== Predictions ===
Source	Ranking	As of
The Cook Political Report	Tossup	November 6, 2008
Rothenberg	Lean D (flip)	November 2, 2008
Sabato's Crystal Ball	Lean D (flip)	November 6, 2008
Real Clear Politics	Tossup	November 7, 2008
CQ Politics	Tossup	November 6, 2008

2008 United States House of Representatives North Carolina 8th district election
Party	Candidate	Votes	%	±%
Democratic	Larry Kissell	157,185	55.38	+5.52
Republican	Robin Hayes (incumbent)	126,634	44.62	−5.52
Turnout		283,819		

== District 9 ==
2008 North Carolina's 9th congressional district election
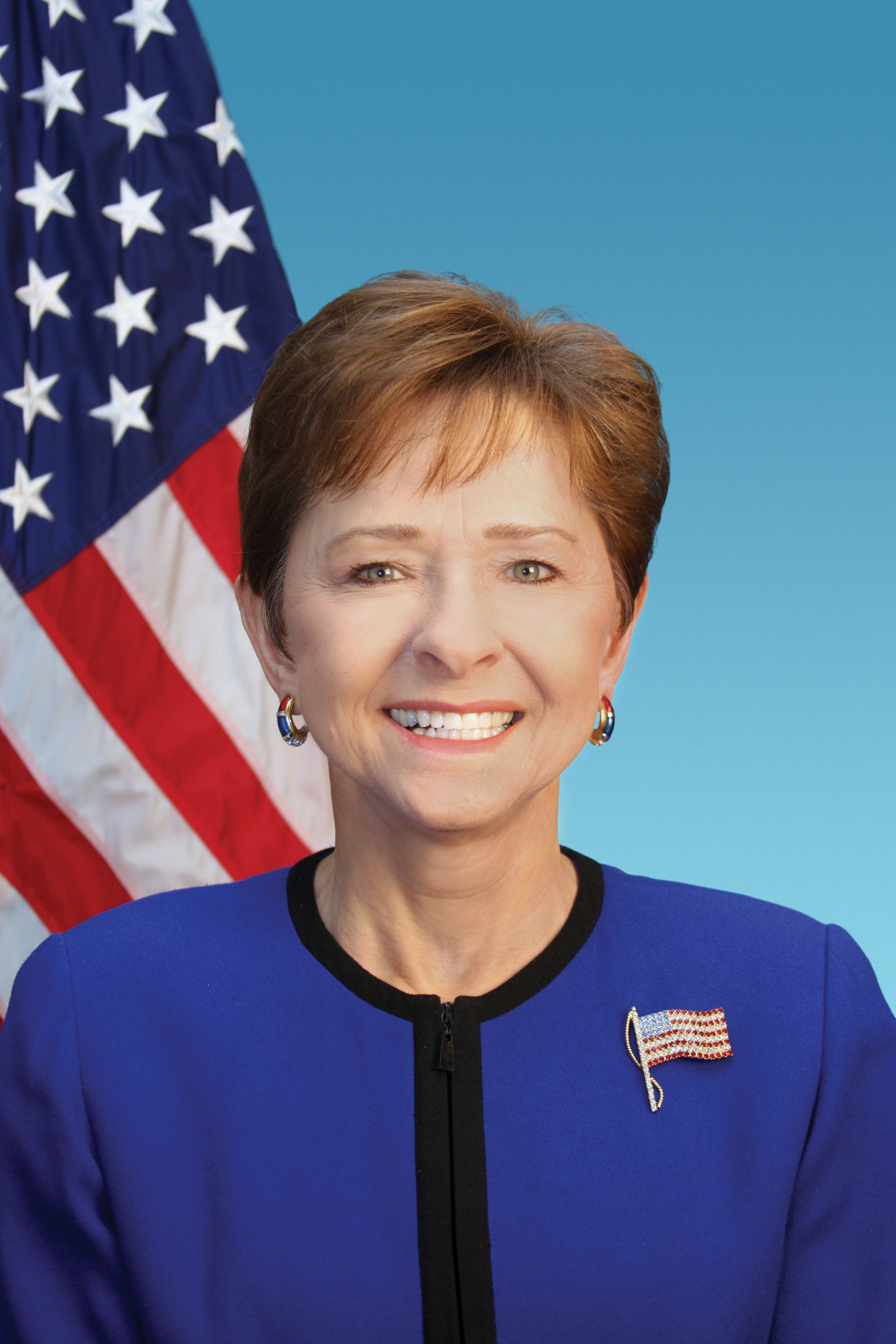

Nominee	Sue Myrick	Harry Taylor
Party	Republican	Democratic
Popular vote	241,053	138,719
Percentage	62.4%	35.9%
- County results Myrick: 50–60% 60–70% 70–80%
U.S. Representative before election
Sue Myrick
Republican
Elected U.S. Representative
Sue Myrick
Republican

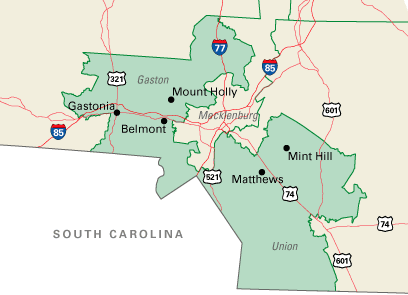

Ross Overby and Harry Taylor ran in the Democratic primary, and incumbent Sue Myrick faced opposition from Jack Stratton in the Republican primary. Taylor defeated Overby, with about 58 percent of the vote, while Myrick easily won re-nomination with 92 percent of the vote. Libertarian Andy Grum also ran in the general election. CQ Politics forecasted the race as 'Safe Republican'.

- Race ranking and details from CQ Politics
- Campaign contributions from OpenSecrets

=== Predictions ===
Source	Ranking	As of
The Cook Political Report	Safe R	November 6, 2008
Rothenberg	Safe R	November 2, 2008
Sabato's Crystal Ball	Safe R	November 6, 2008
Real Clear Politics	Safe R	November 7, 2008
CQ Politics	Safe R	November 6, 2008

2008 United States House of Representatives North Carolina 9th district election
Party	Candidate	Votes	%	±%
Republican	Sue Myrick (incumbent)	241,053	62.37	−4.16
Democratic	Harry Taylor	138,719	35.89	+2.42
Libertarian	Andy Grum	6,711	1.74	N/A
Turnout		386,483		

== District 10 ==
2008 North Carolina's 10th congressional district election
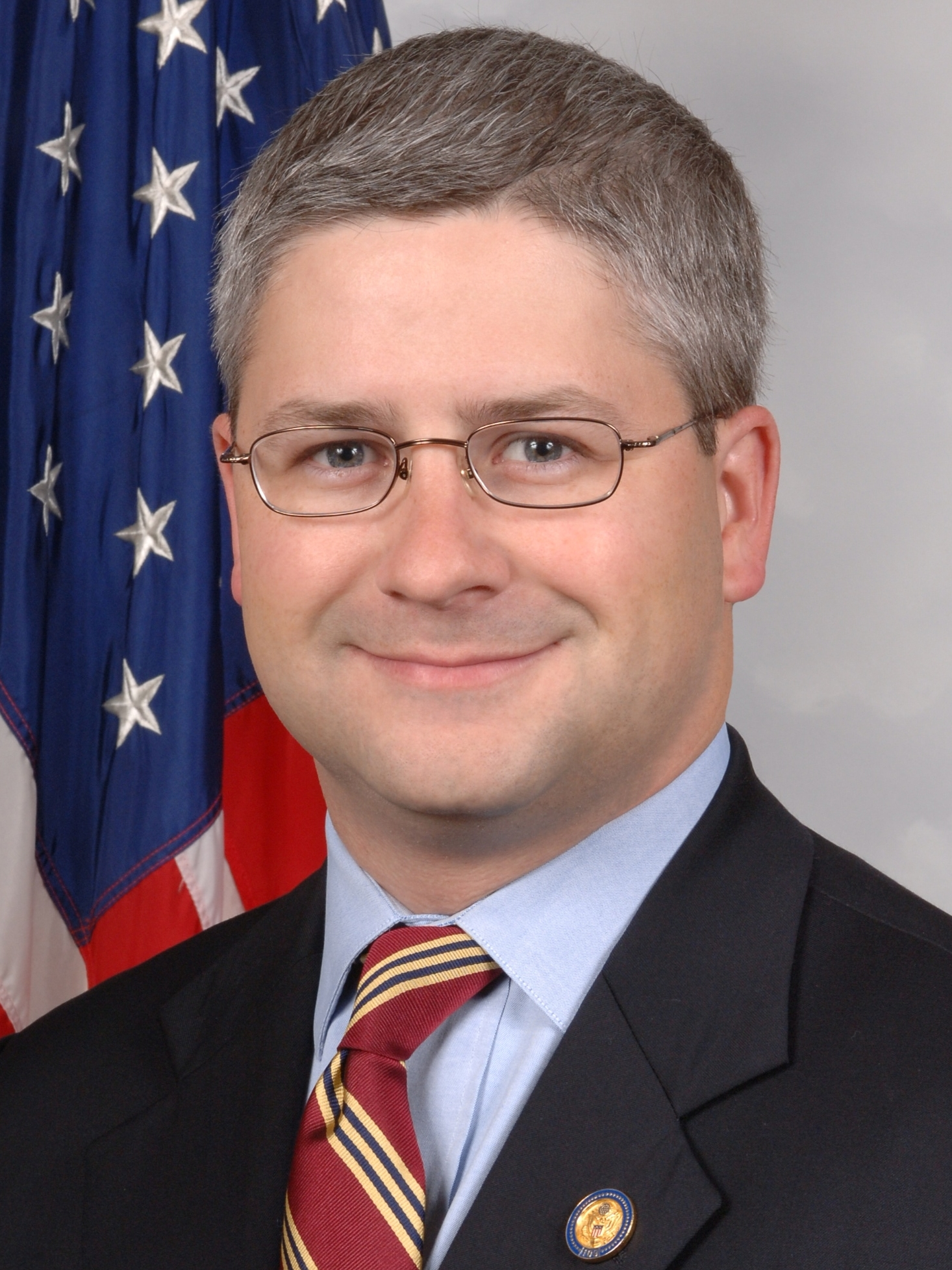

Nominee	Patrick McHenry	Daniel Johnson
Party	Republican	Democratic
Popular vote	171,774	126,699
Percentage	57.5%	42.5%
- County results Mchenry: 50–60% 60–70% 70–80%
U.S. Representative before election
Patrick McHenry
Republican
Elected U.S. Representative
Patrick McHenry
Republican

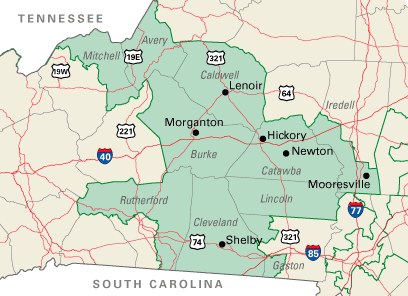

Republican incumbent Patrick McHenry defeated Democratic nominee Daniel Johnson, but the margin of victory was McHenry's smallest to date. Johnson defeated Steve Ivester in the May 6 Democratic primary, with about 60 percent of the vote. McHenry won the Republican primary, garnering about 67 percent of the vote in a race against attorney Lance Sigmon. CQ Politics forecasted the race as 'Republican Favored', while Cook Political Report ranked it as 'Likely Republican'.

- Race ranking and details from CQ Politics
- Race Rankings from Cook Political Report
- Campaign contributions from OpenSecrets
- McHenry (R-i) vs Johnson (D) graph of collected poll results from Pollster.com

=== Predictions ===
Source	Ranking	As of
The Cook Political Report	Safe R	November 6, 2008
Rothenberg	Safe R	November 2, 2008
Sabato's Crystal Ball	Safe R	November 6, 2008
Real Clear Politics	Safe R	November 7, 2008
CQ Politics	Likely R	November 6, 2008

2008 United States House of Representatives North Carolina 10th district election
Party	Candidate	Votes	%	±%
Republican	Patrick McHenry (incumbent)	171,774	57.55	−4.25
Democratic	Daniel Johnson	126,699	42.45	+4.25
Turnout		298,473		

== District 11 ==
2008 North Carolina's 11th congressional district election
- November 4, 2008
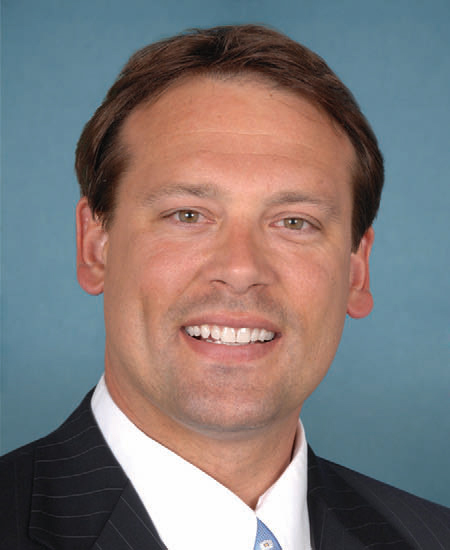

Nominee	Heath Shuler	Carl Mumpower
Party	Democratic	Republican
Popular vote	211,112	122,087
Percentage	61.96%	35.83%
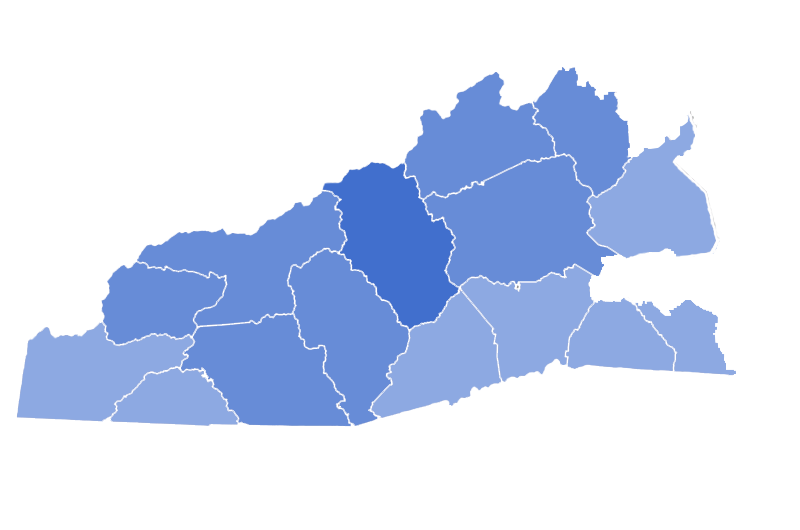
- County results Shuler: 50–60% 60–70% 70–80%
U.S. Representative before election
Heath Shuler
Democratic
Elected U.S. Representative
Heath Shuler
Democratic

First-term incumbent Heath Shuler faced Carl Mumpower, who won a three-way Republican primary that included Spence Campbell and John C. Armor. Shuler was favored, since he did not face opposition from the man he defeated in 2006, former Rep. Charles H. Taylor. Libertarian Keith Smith also ran in the general election. CQ Politics forecasted the race as 'Safe Democrat'.

- Race ranking and details from CQ Politics
- Campaign contributions from OpenSecrets

=== Predictions ===
Source	Ranking	As of
The Cook Political Report	Safe D	November 6, 2008
Rothenberg	Safe D	November 2, 2008
Sabato's Crystal Ball	Safe D	November 6, 2008
Real Clear Politics	Safe D	November 7, 2008
CQ Politics	Safe D	November 6, 2008

2008 United States House of Representatives North Carolina 11th district election
Party	Candidate	Votes	%	±%
Democratic	Heath Shuler (incumbent)	211,112	61.96	+8.17
Republican	Carl Mumpower	122,087	35.83	−10.37
Libertarian	Keith Smith	7,517	2.21	N/A
Turnout		340,716		

== District 12 ==
2008 North Carolina's 12th congressional district election
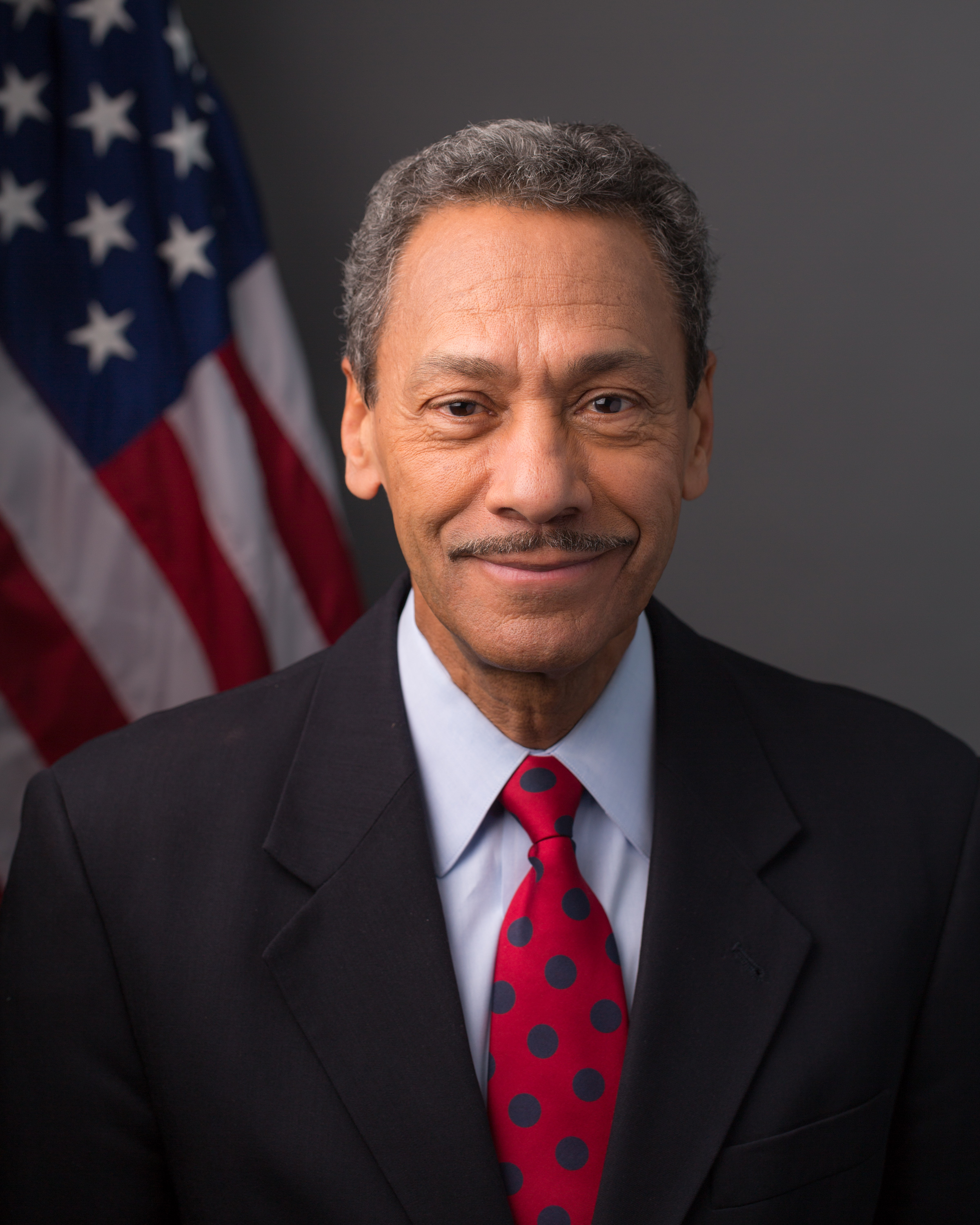

Nominee	Mel Watt	Ty Cobb Jr.
Party	Democratic	Republican
Popular vote	215,908	85,814
Percentage	71.6%	28.4%
- County results Watt: 50–60% 70–80% 80–90% Ty Cobb: 50–60%
U.S. Representative before election
Mel Watt
Democratic
Elected U.S. Representative
Mel Watt
Democratic

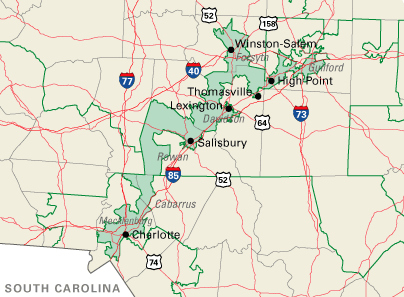

Incumbent Mel Watt was the heavy favorite over little-known Republican and U.S. Army veteran Ty Cobb Jr. (no known relation to the baseball legend Ty Cobb). CQ Politics forecasted the race as 'Safe Democrat'.

- Race ranking and details from CQ Politics
- Campaign contributions from OpenSecrets

=== Predictions ===
Source	Ranking	As of
The Cook Political Report	Safe D	November 6, 2008
Rothenberg	Safe D	November 2, 2008
Sabato's Crystal Ball	Safe D	November 6, 2008
Real Clear Politics	Safe D	November 7, 2008
CQ Politics	Safe D	November 6, 2008

2008 United States House of Representatives North Carolina 12th district election
Party	Candidate	Votes	%	±%
Democratic	Mel Watt (incumbent)	215,908	71.56	+4.55
Republican	Ty Cobb Jr.	85,814	28.44	−4.55
Turnout		301,722		

== District 13 ==
2008 North Carolina's 13th congressional district election
- November 4, 2008
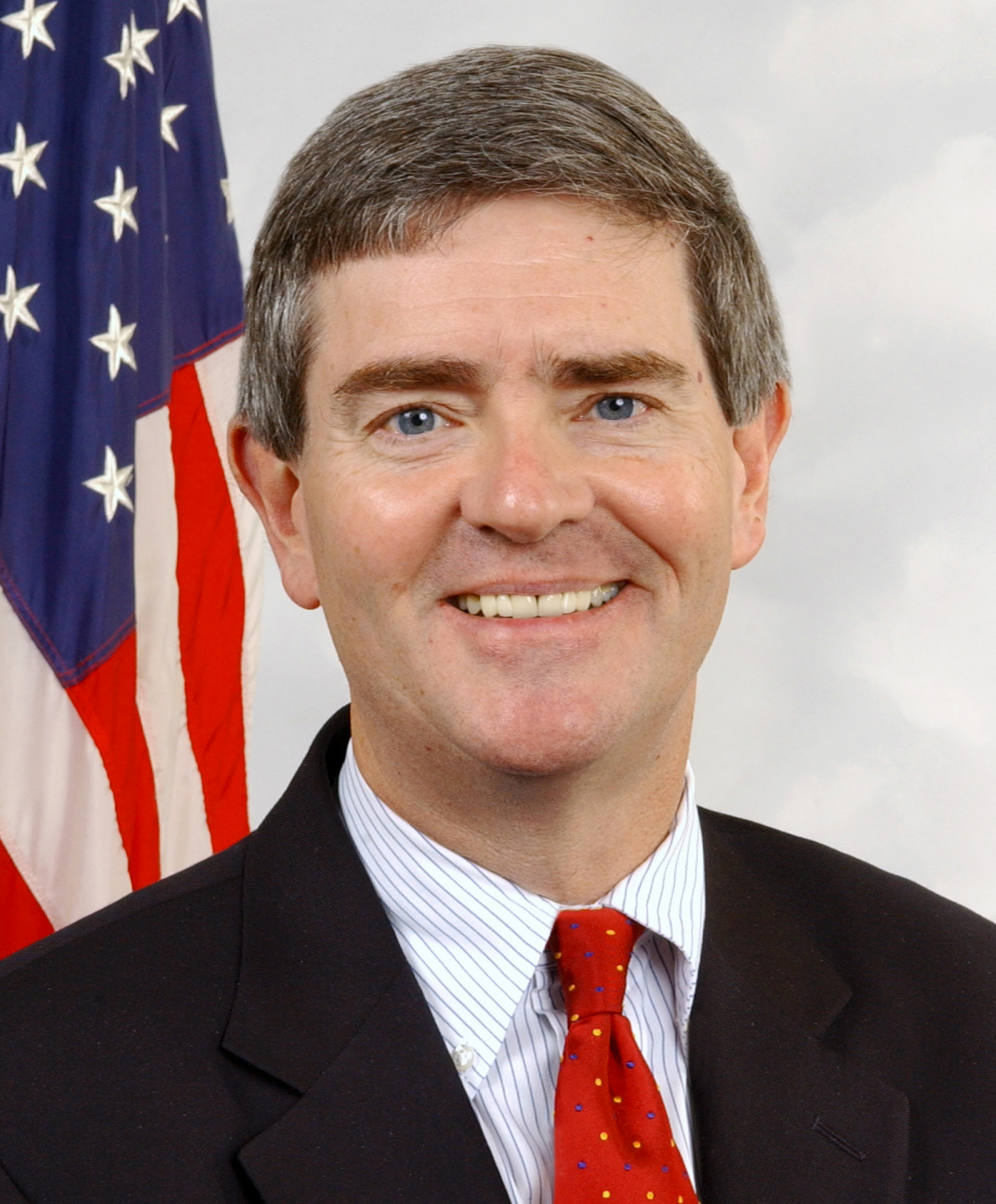

Nominee	Brad Miller	Hugh Webster
Party	Democratic	Republican
Popular vote	221,379	114,383
Percentage	65.93%	34.07%
- County results Miller: 50–60% 60–70% 70–80%
U.S. Representative before election
Brad Miller
Democratic
Elected U.S. Representative
Brad Miller
Democratic

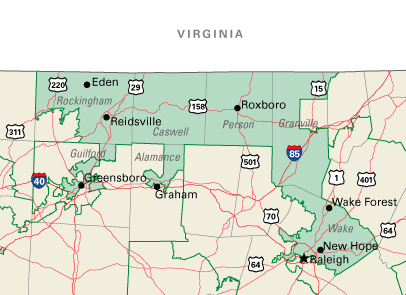

Incumbent Brad Miller faced Republican former state senator Hugh Webster, after easily defeating little-known Derald Hafner in the Democratic primary, with 88 percent of the vote. CQ Politics forecasted the race as 'Safe Democrat'.

- Race ranking and details from CQ Politics
- Campaign contributions from OpenSecrets

=== Predictions ===
Source	Ranking	As of
The Cook Political Report	Safe D	November 6, 2008
Rothenberg	Safe D	November 2, 2008
Sabato's Crystal Ball	Safe D	November 6, 2008
Real Clear Politics	Safe D	November 7, 2008
CQ Politics	Safe D	November 6, 2008

2008 United States House of Representatives North Carolina 13th district election
Party	Candidate	Votes	%	±%
Democratic	Brad Miller (incumbent)	221,379	65.93	+2.22
Republican	Hugh Webster	114,383	34.07	−2.22
Turnout		335,762		

== See also ==
- North Carolina congressional districts
