= First photographs from the floor of the United States Senate in session =

The first photographs from the floor of the United States Senate in session were a series of two photographs by Thomas D. "Tom" McAvoy published in the June 20, 1938 issue of Life magazine.

According to Life, the two images – presented in a four page photo essay showing other scenes from in and around the United States Capitol – were captured by McAvoy, one of the magazines' staff photographers, on June 2 of that year. Photography of the Senate had been informally prohibited up until that point and, in the 1950s, the prohibition was formalized through adoption of a new rule by the chamber. The publication reported that their photos were captured after McAvoy had been given special permission by United States Senator Alben W. Barkley, who was then serving as Majority Leader, to take the images.

According to the publication, their photographs of the Senate were not the first captured, but "previous photographs of the Senate at work have been sneak shots taken with smuggled cameras from the gallery". In 1963, a second set of photos was permitted by National Geographic for use in a book on the United States Capitol. In the 1980s, rules were relaxed to permit limited motion filming of the Senate's proceedings, however, this video is produced by the Senate Recording Studio, a government office, and provided to news organizations and the public; private filming by the public or media remains prohibited, as does still photography.

== See also ==
- Hideaway (U.S. Senate)
