= William Current =

American politician from North Carolina (1933–2024)

Member of the North Carolina House of Representatives from the 109th district
- In office January 1, 2005 – January 1, 2013
- Preceded by: Patrick McHenry
- Succeeded by: Dana Bumgardner

Personal details
- Born: William Ange Current Sr. May 4, 1933 Gastonia, North Carolina
- Died: February 5, 2024 (aged 90)
- Party: Republican
- Spouse: Elizabeth Oden (m. 1962, died 2019)
- Children: 4
- Education: University of North Carolina at Chapel Hill (BS, DDS)
- Profession: Dentist

William Ange Current, Sr. (May 4, 1933 – February 5, 2024) was an American politician. He served as a Republican member of the North Carolina House of Representatives for 109th district from 2005 to 2013.

== Committee Assignments ==
=== 2011–2012 session ===
- Appropriations
- Appropriations - Health and Human Services
- Commerce and Job Development
- Alcoholic Beverage Control
- Elections (Vice Chair)
- Ethics
- Health and Human Services (Chair)
- Health and Human Services - Mental Health
- Insurance
- Transportation

=== 2009–2010 session ===
- Appropriations
- Appropriations - Transportation
- Election Law and Campaign Finance Reform
- Ethics
- Health
- Insurance
- Rules, Calendar, and Operations of the House

== Electoral history ==
=== 2010 ===
North Carolina House of Representatives 109th district general election, 2010
Party	Candidate	Votes	%
Republican	William Current (incumbent)	12,183	100%
Total votes		12,183	100%
Republican hold			

=== 2008 ===
North Carolina House of Representatives 109th district general election, 2008
Party	Candidate	Votes	%
Republican	William Current (incumbent)	16,079	55.35%
Democratic	Shirley Wiggins	12,973	44.65%
Total votes		29,052	100%
Republican hold			

=== 2006 ===
North Carolina House of Representatives 109th district general election, 2006
Party	Candidate	Votes	%
Republican	William Current (incumbent)	9,047	100%
Total votes		9,047	100%
Republican hold			

=== 2004 ===
North Carolina House of Representatives 109th district Republican primary election, 2004
Party	Candidate	Votes	%
Republican	William Current	1,265	59.92%
Republican	Donnie Loftis	506	23.97%
Republican	Pat Underwood	340	16.11%
Total votes		2,111	100%

North Carolina House of Representatives 109th district general election, 2004
Party	Candidate	Votes	%
Republican	William Current	13,629	61.38%
Democratic	Shirley M. Wiggins	8,577	38.62%
Total votes		22,206	100%
Republican hold			

North Carolina House of Representatives
Preceded by Patrick McHenry	Member of the North Carolina House of Representatives from the 109th district 2005–2013	Succeeded by Dana Bumgardner

== See also ==
- List of Mitt Romney 2012 presidential campaign endorsements
