= North Carolina Department of Transportation =

Government agency in North Carolina, U.S.

North Carolina Department of Transportation (NCDOT)
- Seal of the North Carolina Department of Transportation

Agency overview
- Formed: 1979
- Preceding agencies: North Carolina Highway Commission; North Carolina Department of Transportation and Highway Safety
- Headquarters: Raleigh, North Carolina
- Agency executives: Daniel Johnson, Secretary of Transportation; Josh Stein, Governor of North Carolina
- Website: ncdot.gov

The North Carolina Department of Transportation (NCDOT) is responsible for building, repairing, and operating highways, bridges, and other modes of transportation, including ferries in the U.S. state of North Carolina.

== History ==
The North Carolina Department of Transportation was formed in 1915 as the State Highway Commission. In 1931, the commission was restructured to include a chair and six other members appointed by the governor. It also assumed responsibility for the maintenance of all county roads in the state and all inmates of county jails sentenced to over 60 days incarceration. In 1933, the agency was merged with the state prison system to form the State Highway and Public Works Commission.

In 1941 the Department of Motor Vehicles (DMV) was formed under the NCDoT by an act of the General Assembly. The Executive Organization Act of 1971 combined the state highway commission and the DMV to form the NC Department of Transportation and Highway Safety. In 1979 "Highway Safety" was dropped when the North Carolina State Highway Patrol (NCSHP) was transferred to the North Carolina Department of Crime Control and Public Safety.

== Board of Transportation ==
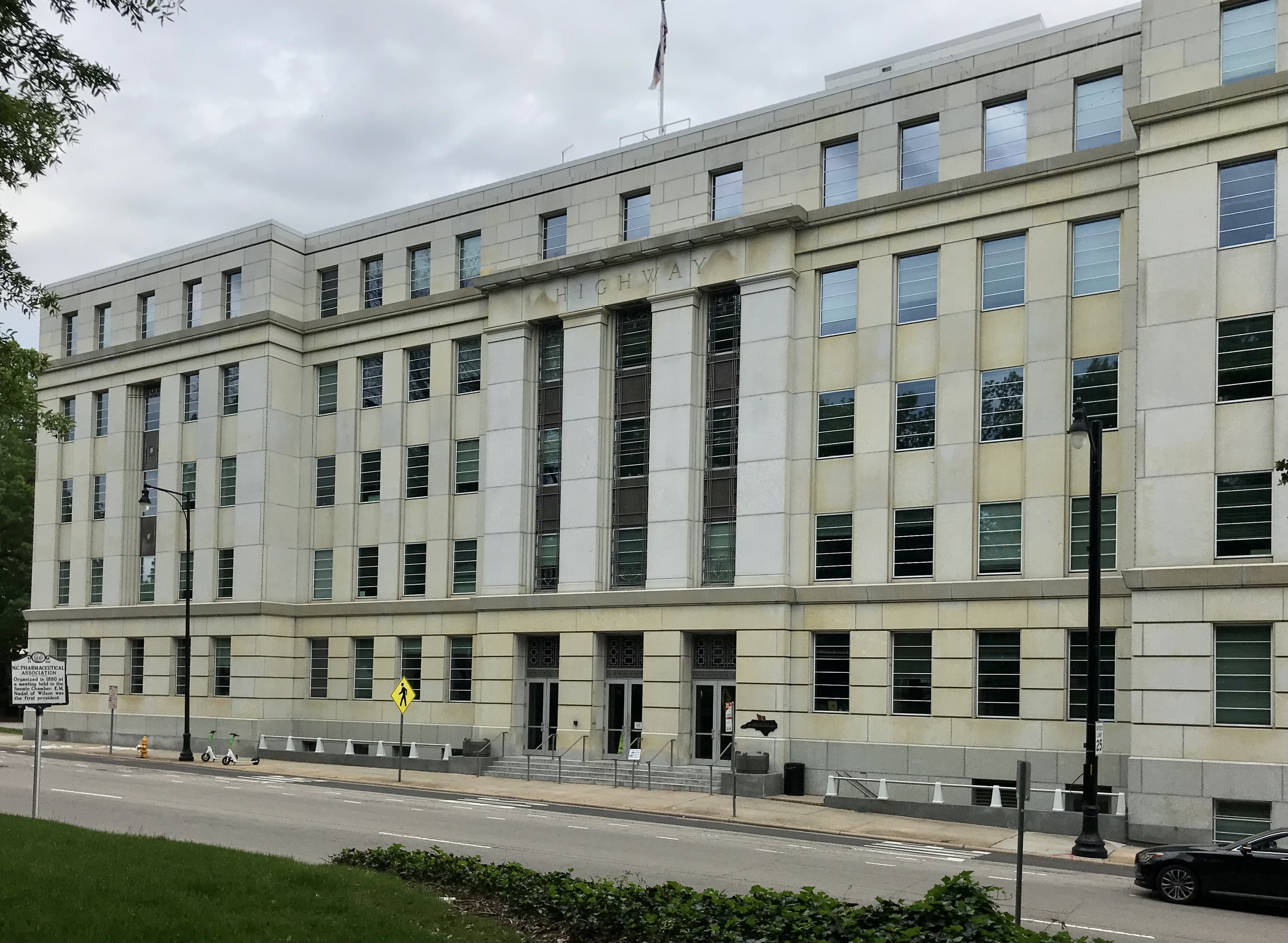
North Carolina Transportation Building

The board governs the department and is the decision-making body. Fourteen board members are appointed by the governor, one each from one of the fourteen divisions, and six others appointed by the NC House Speaker and NC Senate Pro-Tempore, representing specific functions of the department that meet once a month.

== Divisions of the NCDOT ==
=== Division of Motor Vehicles ===
The Division of Motor Vehicles (DMV) provides motor services like issuing licenses and permits, promote highway safety, giving accurate information about road conditions, enforcing motor vehicle laws, and keeping hold of official DMV records.

=== Division of Highways ===
The Division of Highways is responsible for building and maintaining the second largest state maintained highway system in the nation, incorporating over 78,615 miles (126,519 km) of highways, and 18,540 bridges collectively spanning 376.98 miles (606.69 km).

=== Division of Aviation ===
The Division of Aviation's mission is to maintain the North Carolina air transportation system development and improve aviation safety and education. The current director is Nicholas Short, PE.

=== Integrated Mobility Division ===
The Integrated Mobility Division administers state and federal funds for public transportation, bicycle, and pedestrian programs and provides subject matter expertise related to multimodal transportation funding, planning, innovation, data, technology, and emerging mobility trends. The current director is Brennon Fuqua.

The division's mission is to provide leadership for safe, affordable, and innovative multimodal transportation throughout North Carolina.

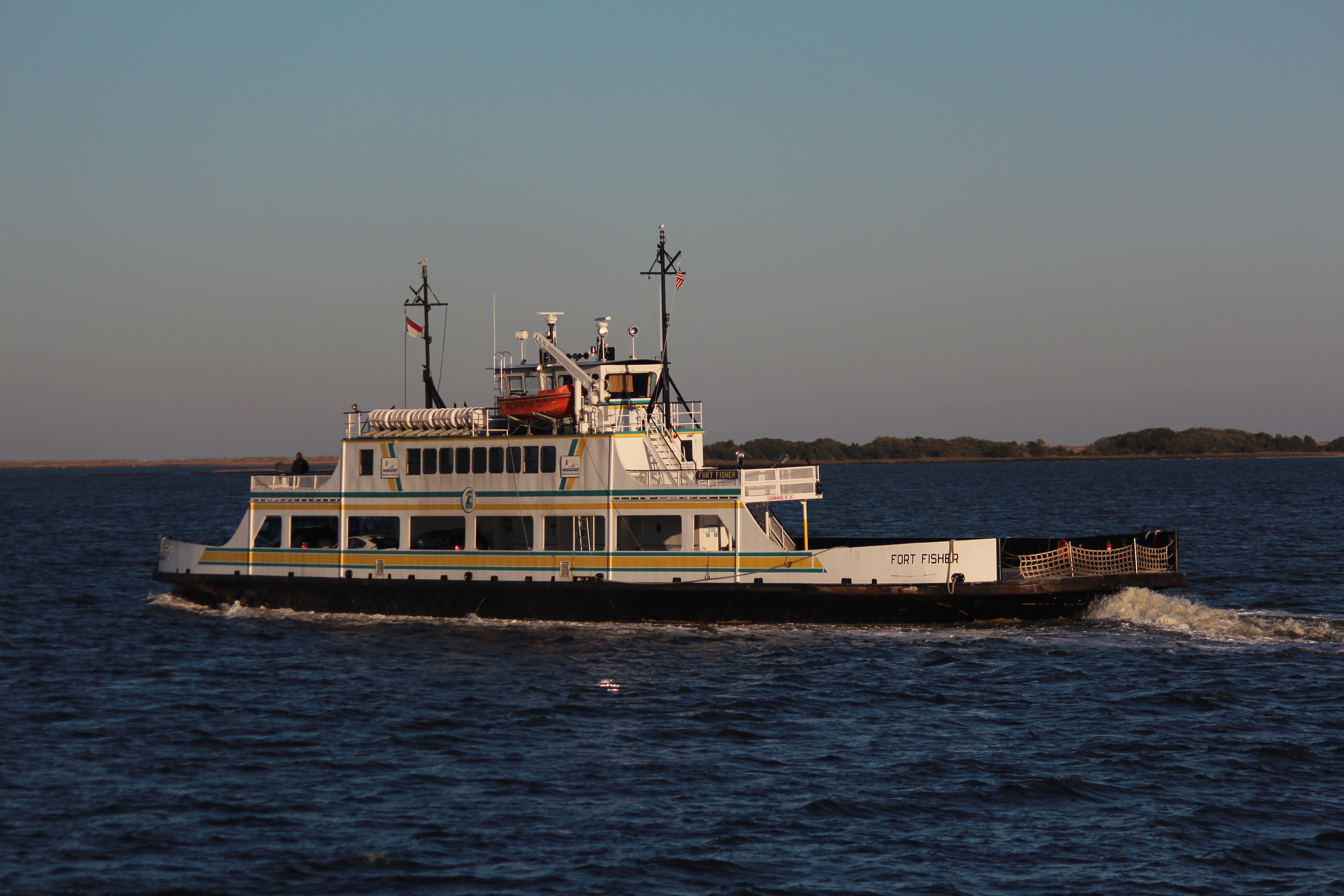
M/V Fort Fisher, one of 23 ferries operated by NCDOT

=== Ferry Division ===
The Ferry Division is responsible for providing ferry services to public. The Ferry Division operates eight routes connecting mainland North Carolina with various outer banks and islands along the coast of North Carolina. The current director is Jed Dixon.

=== Rail Division ===
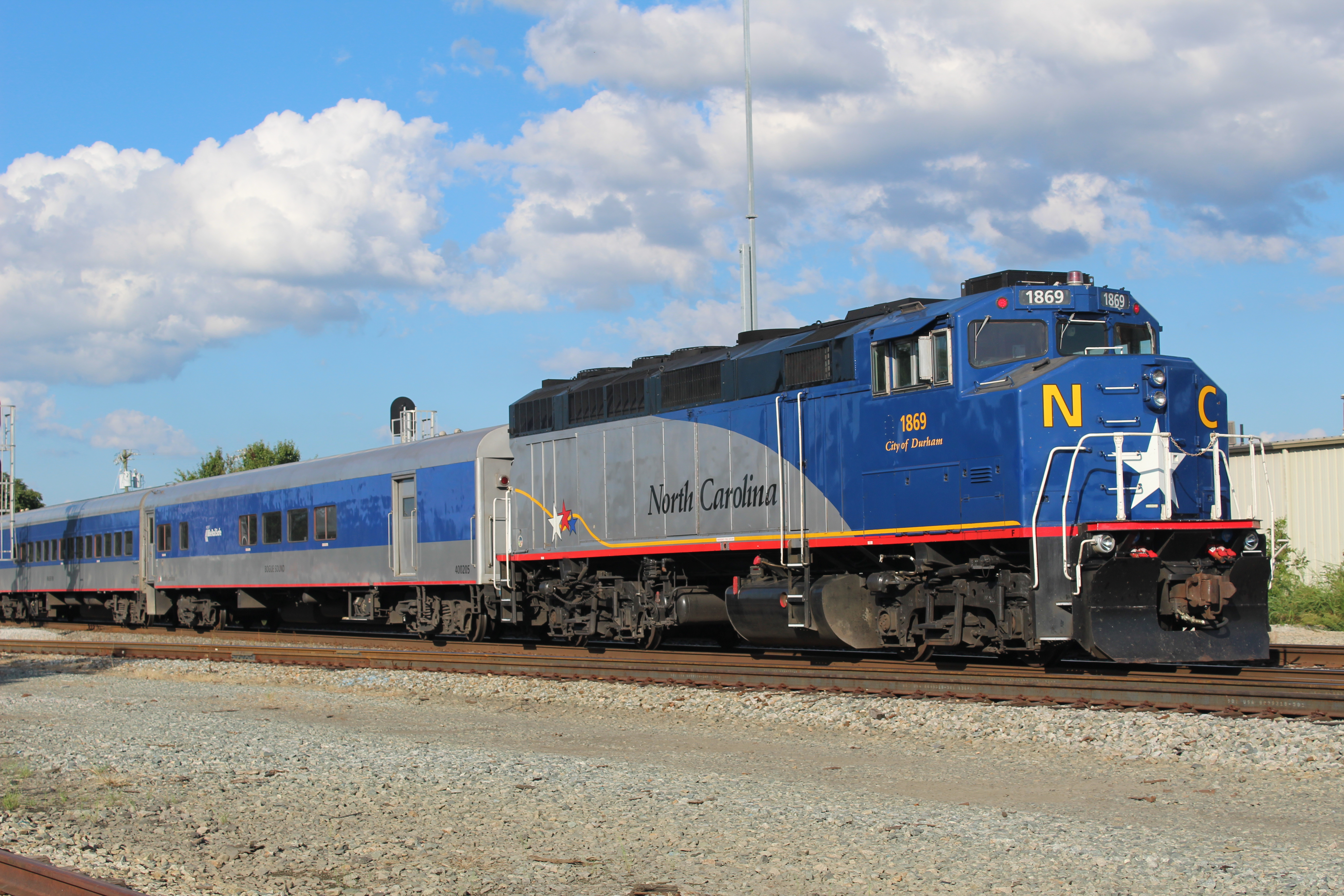
The Amtrak Piedmont train, funded by the NCDOT.

The Rail Division is responsible for operation of six Amtrak trains within North Carolina under the NC By Train brand and works with the North Carolina Railroad Company, a state owned railroad that carries both freight and passenger rail service. The route is 317 miles (510 km) long and runs from Charlotte, North Carolina to one of the state ports at Morehead City, NC. The route passes through the cities of Charlotte, Salisbury, Lexington, Greensboro, Burlington, Durham, Raleigh, Goldsboro and on to Morehead City. The North Carolina Railroad trackage is currently leased to Norfolk Southern Railway. A small portion between Raleigh and Cary is co-operated with Norfolk Southern by CSX Transportation. The state operates no freight trains and all freight is handled by either CSX or Norfolk Southern. However, the division does own the rolling stock used on the Piedmont under the reporting mark RNCX. The current director is Jason Orthner, PE.

NCDOT Passenger Rail Division Services (offered jointly with Amtrak)
Train Name	Train Number	Train Routing
Piedmont	71/72/73/74/75/76/77/78	Raleigh to Charlotte
Carolinian	79/80	New York to Charlotte

== See also ==
- North Carolina Ferry System
- North Carolina Highway System
- North Carolina Turnpike Authority
- Vehicle registration plates of North Carolina

== Works cited ==
- Sawyer, Ann L. (1981). "Fifty Years of North Carolina State Government". Popular Government. Vol. 46, no. 3. UNC Institute of Government. pp. 4–10.
