= Dana Bumgardner =

American politician (1954–2021)

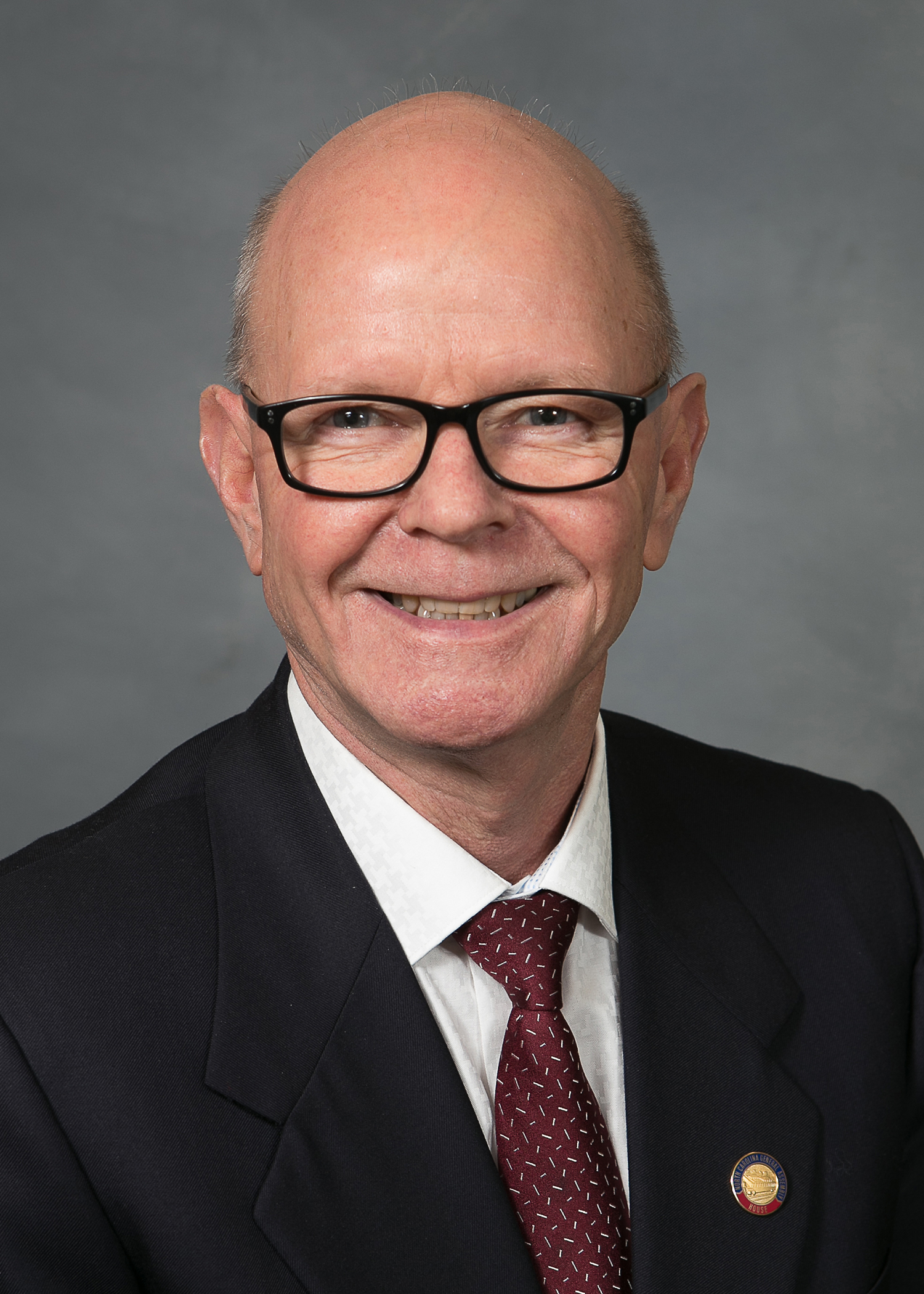

Member of the North Carolina House of Representatives from the 109th district
- In office January 1, 2013 – October 2, 2021
- Preceded by: William Current
- Succeeded by: Donnie Loftis

Personal details
- Born: Dana Byron Bumgardner; May 16, 1954 Mooresville, North Carolina, U.S.
- Died: October 2, 2021 (aged 67) Gastonia, North Carolina, U.S.
- Party: Republican

Dana Byron Bumgardner (May 16, 1954 – October 2, 2021) was an American businessman and politician who served as a Republican member of the North Carolina General Assembly from 2013 until his death. He represented the 109th district, representing a portion of Gaston County.

== Life and career ==
Bumgardner was the president and CEO of LPM, Inc., a now-defunct label printing business in Dallas, North Carolina, and lived in Gastonia, North Carolina. Bumgardner died from liver cancer at his home in Gastonia on October 2, 2021, at age 67.

== Electoral history ==
=== 2020 ===
North Carolina House of Representatives 109th district general election, 2020
Party	Candidate	Votes	%
Republican	Dana Bumgardner (incumbent)	29,143	62.13%
Democratic	Susan Maxon	17,767	37.87%
Total votes		46,910	100%
Republican hold			

=== 2018 ===
North Carolina House of Representatives 109th district general election, 2018
Party	Candidate	Votes	%
Republican	Dana Bumgardner (incumbent)	16,407	58.84%
Democratic	Susan Maxon	11,400	40.88%
Write-in		55	0.20%
Unaffaliated	Jennie Stultz (Write-In)	22	0.08%
Total votes		27,884	100%
Republican hold			

=== 2016 ===
North Carolina House of Representatives 109th district general election, 2016
Party	Candidate	Votes	%
Republican	Dana Bumgardner (incumbent)	21,687	61.19%
Democratic	Susan Maxon	13,755	38.81%
Total votes		35,442	100%
Republican hold			

=== 2014 ===
North Carolina House of Representatives 109th district Republican primary election, 2014
Party	Candidate	Votes	%
Republican	Dana Bumgardner (incumbent)	2,342	65.97%
Republican	Mickey Price	1,208	34.03%
Total votes		3,550	100%

North Carolina House of Representatives 109th district general election, 2014
Party	Candidate	Votes	%
Republican	Dana Bumgardner (incumbent)	14,221	100%
Total votes		14,221	100%
Republican hold			

=== 2012 ===
North Carolina House of Representatives 109th district Republican primary election, 2012
Party	Candidate	Votes	%
Republican	Dana Bumgardner	2,990	35.05%
Republican	Wil Neumann	2,023	23.71%
Republican	Tom Keigher	1,885	22.10%
Republican	Donnie Loftis	1,633	19.14%
Total votes		8,531	100%

North Carolina House of Representatives 109th district Republican primary run-off election, 2012
Party	Candidate	Votes	%
Republican	Dana Bumgardner	1,585	52.83%
Republican	Wil Neumann	1,415	47.17%
Total votes		3,000	100%

North Carolina House of Representatives 109th district general election, 2012
Party	Candidate	Votes	%
Republican	Dana Bumgardner	19,772	59.22%
Democratic	Dodie Reese	13,618	40.78%
Total votes		33,390	100%
Republican hold			

== Committee assignments ==
=== 2021-2022 Session ===
- Appropriations (Chair)
- Appropriations - Transportation (Vice Chair)
- Transportation
- Insurance (Vice Chair)
- Rules, Calendar, and Operations of the House

=== 2019-2020 Session ===
- Appropriations
- Appropriations - Health and Human Services
- Insurance (Chair)
- Transportation
- Finance
- Rules, Calendar, and Operations of the House
- Judiciary

=== 2017-2018 Session ===
- Appropriations
- Appropriations - Transportation
- Insurance (Chair)
- Health Care Reform (Chair)
- Transportation
- Judiciary II
- Energy and Public Utilities
- Rules, Calendar, and Operations of the House

=== 2015-2016 Session ===
- Appropriations
- Appropriations - Transportation
- Insurance (Chair)
- Transportation
- Banking
- Judiciary II
- Public Utilities

=== 2013-2014 Session ===
- Appropriations
- Commerce and Job Development
- Education
- Insurance
- Transportation (Vice Chair)

North Carolina House of Representatives
Preceded by William Current	Member of the North Carolina House of Representatives from the 109th district 2013-2021	Succeeded by Donnie Loftis
