= North Carolina's 109th House district =

American legislative district

North Carolina's 109th State House of Representatives district
Representative
Donnie Loftis; R–Gastonia
- Demographics: 66% White; 17% Black; 10% Hispanic; 2% Asian; 1% Other; 4% Multiracial
- Population (2024): 91,323

North Carolina's 109th House district is one of 120 districts in the North Carolina House of Representatives. It has been represented by Republican Donnie Loftis since his appointment in November 2021.

== Geography ==
Since 2003, the district has included part of Gaston County. The district overlaps with the 43rd Senate district.

== District officeholders since 2003 ==
Representative	Party	Dates	Notes	Counties
District created January 1, 2003.				2003–Present; Part of Gaston County.
Patrick McHenry (Gastonia)	Republican	January 1, 2003 – January 1, 2005	Retired to run for Congress.	2003–Present; Part of Gaston County.
William Current (Gastonia)	Republican	January 1, 2005 – January 1, 2013	Retired.	2003–Present; Part of Gaston County.
Dana Bumgardner (Gastonia)	Republican	January 1, 2013 – October 2, 2021	Died.	2003–Present; Part of Gaston County.
Vacant		October 2, 2021 – November 1, 2021		2003–Present; Part of Gaston County.
Donnie Loftis (Gastonia)	Republican	November 1, 2021 – Present	Appointed to finish Bumgardner's term.	2003–Present; Part of Gaston County.

== Election results ==
=== 2024 ===
North Carolina House of Representatives 109th district general election, 2024
Party	Candidate	Votes	%
Republican	Donnie Loftis (incumbent)	28,167	58.03%
Democratic	Pam Morgenstern	20,374	41.97%
Total votes		48,541	100%
Republican hold			

=== 2022 ===
North Carolina House of Representatives 109th district Republican primary election, 2022
Party	Candidate	Votes	%
Republican	Donnie Loftis (incumbent)	2,649	33.69%
Republican	John Gouch	1,814	23.07%
Republican	Ronnie Worley	1,742	22.15%
Republican	Lauren Bumgardner Current	1,658	21.09%
Total votes		7,863	100%

North Carolina House of Representatives 109th district general election, 2022
Party	Candidate	Votes	%
Republican	Donnie Loftis (incumbent)	18,785	60.80%
Democratic	Eric Hughes	12,112	39.20%
Total votes		30,897	100%
Republican hold			

=== 2020 ===
North Carolina House of Representatives 109th district general election, 2020
Party	Candidate	Votes	%
Republican	Dana Bumgardner (incumbent)	29,143	62.13%
Democratic	Susan Maxon	17,767	37.87%
Total votes		46,910	100%
Republican hold			

=== 2018 ===
North Carolina House of Representatives 109th district general election, 2018
Party	Candidate	Votes	%
Republican	Dana Bumgardner (incumbent)	16,407	58.84%
Democratic	Susan Maxon	11,400	40.88%
Write-in		55	0.20%
Independent	Jennie Stultz (Write-In)	22	0.08%
Total votes		27,884	100%
Republican hold			

=== 2016 ===
North Carolina House of Representatives 109th district general election, 2016
Party	Candidate	Votes	%
Republican	Dana Bumgardner (incumbent)	21,687	61.19%
Democratic	Susan Maxon	13,755	38.81%
Total votes		35,442	100%
Republican hold			

=== 2014 ===
North Carolina House of Representatives 109th district Republican primary election, 2014
Party	Candidate	Votes	%
Republican	Dana Bumgardner (incumbent)	2,342	65.97%
Republican	Mickey Price	1,208	34.03%
Total votes		3,550	100%

North Carolina House of Representatives 109th district general election, 2014
Party	Candidate	Votes	%
Republican	Dana Bumgardner (incumbent)	14,221	100%
Total votes		14,221	100%
Republican hold			

=== 2012 ===
North Carolina House of Representatives 109th district Republican primary election, 2012
Party	Candidate	Votes	%
Republican	Dana Bumgardner	2,990	35.05%
Republican	Wil Neumann	2,023	23.71%
Republican	Tom Keigher	1,885	22.10%
Republican	Donnie Loftis	1,633	19.14%
Total votes		8,531	100%

North Carolina House of Representatives 109th district Republican primary run-off election, 2012
Party	Candidate	Votes	%
Republican	Dana Bumgardner	1,585	52.83%
Republican	Wil Neumann	1,415	47.17%
Total votes		3,000	100%

North Carolina House of Representatives 109th district general election, 2012
Party	Candidate	Votes	%
Republican	Dana Bumgardner	19,772	59.22%
Democratic	Dodie Reese	13,618	40.78%
Total votes		33,390	100%
Republican hold			

=== 2010 ===
North Carolina House of Representatives 109th district general election, 2010
Party	Candidate	Votes	%
Republican	William Current (incumbent)	12,183	100%
Total votes		12,183	100%
Republican hold			

=== 2008 ===
North Carolina House of Representatives 109th district general election, 2008
Party	Candidate	Votes	%
Republican	William Current (incumbent)	16,079	55.35%
Democratic	Shirley Wiggins	12,973	44.65%
Total votes		29,052	100%
Republican hold			

=== 2006 ===
North Carolina House of Representatives 109th district general election, 2006
Party	Candidate	Votes	%
Republican	William Current (incumbent)	9,047	100%
Total votes		9,047	100%
Republican hold			

=== 2004 ===
North Carolina House of Representatives 109th district Republican primary election, 2004
Party	Candidate	Votes	%
Republican	William Current	1,265	59.92%
Republican	Donnie Loftis	506	23.97%
Republican	Pat Underwood	340	16.11%
Total votes		2,111	100%

North Carolina House of Representatives 109th district general election, 2004
Party	Candidate	Votes	%
Republican	William Current	13,629	61.38%
Democratic	Shirley M. Wiggins	8,577	38.62%
Total votes		22,206	100%
Republican hold			

=== 2002 ===
North Carolina House of Representatives 109th district Democratic primary election, 2002
Party	Candidate	Votes	%
Democratic	John Eaker	1,852	73.46%
Democratic	Glenda Payne Eudy	669	26.54%
Total votes		2,521	100%

North Carolina House of Representatives 109th district Republican primary election, 2002
Party	Candidate	Votes	%
Republican	Patrick McHenry	1,400	55.87%
Republican	David Carlyle Beam	561	22.39%
Republican	Walt Mallonee	545	21.75%
Total votes		2,506	100%

North Carolina House of Representatives 109th district general election, 2002
Party	Candidate	Votes	%
Republican	Patrick McHenry	7,643	54.37%
Democratic	John Eaker	6,093	43.34%
Libertarian	David Secrist	321	2.28%
Total votes		14,057	100%
Republican win (new seat)			
