= Donnie Loftis =

American politician from North Carolina (born 1956)

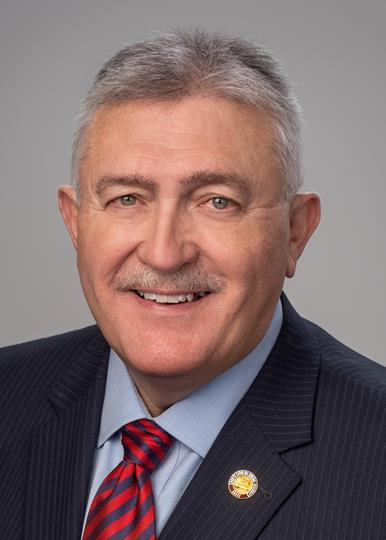

Member of the North Carolina House of Representatives from the 109th district
- Incumbent
- Assumed office November 1, 2021
- Preceded by: Dana Bumgardner

Personal details
- Born: September 7, 1956 (age 69)
- Party: Republican
- Spouse: Deena
- Children: 1

Donnie Loftis (born September 7, 1956) is an American politician who has served in the North Carolina House of Representatives since November 2021. A member of the Republican Party, he represents the 109th district, which contains part of Gaston County.

Loftis previously served as chair of the Gaston County board of commissioners and as chair of the board of directors of CaroMont Health. He resigned the latter position on May 4, 2020, in the midst of the COVID-19 pandemic in North Carolina, and posting on his personal Facebook page that Gov. Roy Cooper's stay-at-home order amounted to "tyranny".

Loftis was also present at the U.S. Capitol riot on January 6, 2021. He wrote on social media on January 6 that he "got gassed three times and was at the entrance when they breached the door". When asked by a reporter in October 2021 about his involvement, he claimed that he "had absolutely zero involvement in the rioting and categorically condemn the storming of our Capitol building that day".

== North Carolina House of Representatives (2021–present) ==
Loftis previously ran for the 109th district seat in the North Carolina House of Representatives in 2012. In the four-candidate Republican primary won by Dana Bumgardner, he placed fourth with 19.1% of the vote.

=== Appointment ===
After Rep. Bumgardner died in office on October 2, 2021, from liver cancer, the county Republican Party convened to recommend a candidate to replace him. The governor, Roy Cooper, was then required to appoint this candidate to the North Carolina House of Representatives within seven days. Loftis defeated county commissioner Ronnie Worley and Bumgardner's daughter Lauren Bumgardner Current to win the party endorsement on October 21.

Loftis was sworn in on November 1, 2021. His seating led to a walk-out by House Democrats to protest his involvement in the U.S. Capitol riot. Bobbie Richardson, chair of the North Carolina Democratic Party, said in a statement that "today marks a new low for General Assembly Republicans, because instead of condemning those actions and rejecting the rhetoric that incites violence, they are welcoming a Capitol insurrection participant with open arms".

=== 2021-2022 session ===
- Appropriations
- Appropriations - Transportation
- Health
- Homeland Security, Military, and Veterans Affairs
- Local Government
- Transportation

== Electoral history ==
=== 2022 ===
North Carolina House of Representatives 109th district Republican primary election, 2022
Party	Candidate	Votes	%
Republican	Donnie Loftis (incumbent)	2,649	33.69%
Republican	John Gouch	1,814	23.07%
Republican	Ronnie Worley	1,742	22.15%
Republican	Lauren Bumgardner Current	1,658	21.09%
Total votes		7,863	100%

=== 2012 ===
North Carolina House of Representatives 109th district Republican primary election, 2012
Party	Candidate	Votes	%
Republican	Dana Bumgardner	2,990	35.05%
Republican	Wil Neumann	2,023	23.71%
Republican	Tom Keigher	1,885	22.10%
Republican	Donnie Loftis	1,633	19.14%
Total votes		8,531	100%

=== 2008 ===
Gaston County Board of Commissioners Gastonia Township district general election, 2008
Party	Candidate	Votes	%
Republican	Donnie Loftis	44,305	55.52%
Democratic	Jennifer Pharr Davis	35,490	44.48%
Total votes		79,795	100%

=== 2004 ===
North Carolina House of Representatives 109th district Republican primary election, 2004
Party	Candidate	Votes	%
Republican	William Current	1,265	59.92%
Republican	Donnie Loftis	506	23.97%
Republican	Pat Underwood	340	16.11%
Total votes		2,111	100%

North Carolina House of Representatives
Preceded by Dana Bumgardner	Member of the North Carolina House of Representatives from the 109th district 2021–present	Incumbent
