= Hideaway (U.S. Senate) =

Secret offices of the US Senate

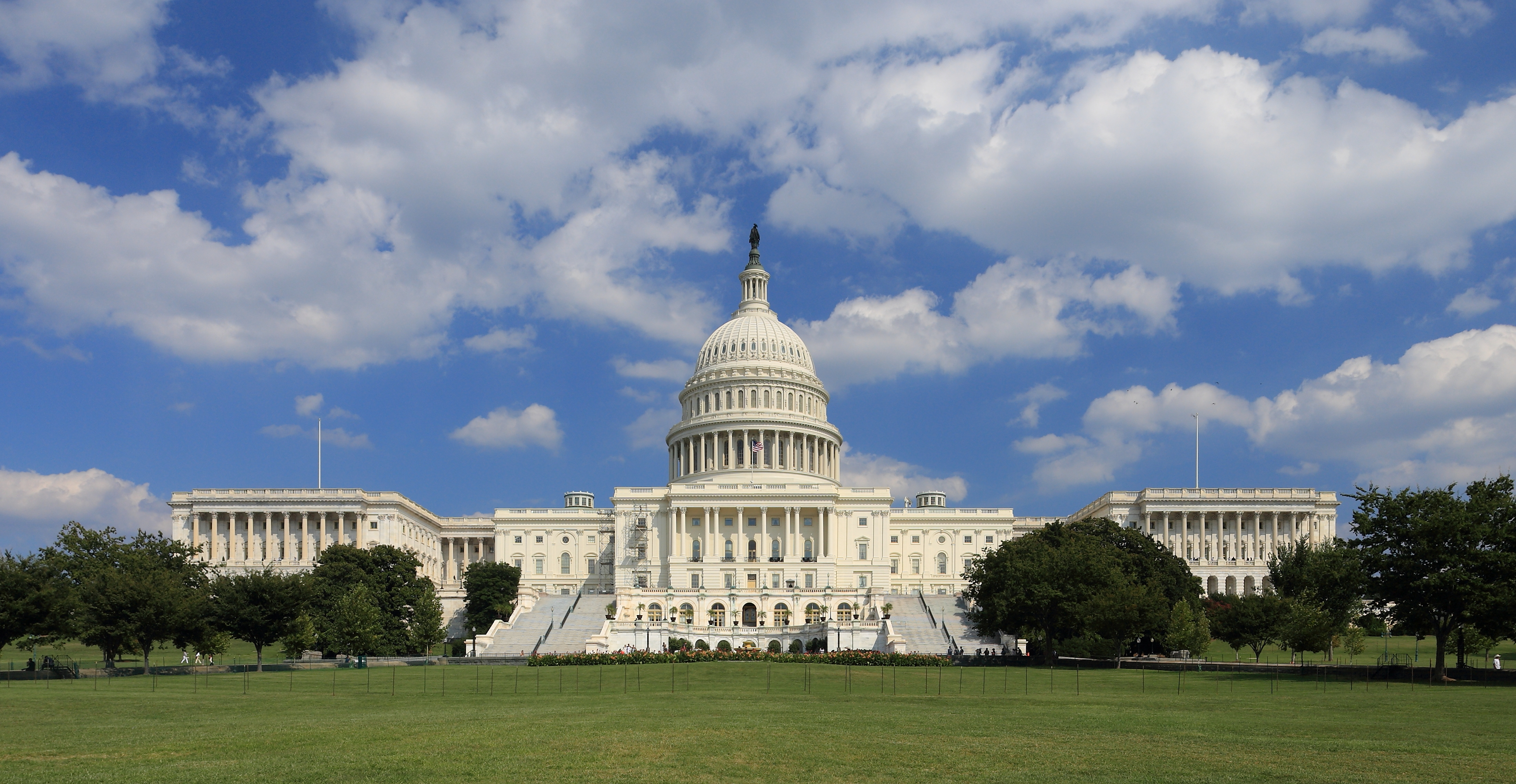
Hideaways are secret offices located in "ancient nooks" of the United States Capitol building

The United States Senate's hideaways are about 100 secret offices in the U.S. Capitol building used by members of the Senate and by a few senior members of the U.S. House of Representatives. Their locations are unlisted in any official directory, and their doors are marked only by a room number. Senators use hideaways as a private space to prepare for sessions of the Senate, conduct confidential meetings, take naps, and for other personal purposes. They range from lavish and expansive upper-floor offices to small, cramped offices in the basement. Hideaways are assigned to senators based on seniority. The history of hideaways dates to the earliest occupancy of the U.S. Capitol in 1800. However, they proliferated in the early 20th century.

== Background ==
Members of the United States Senate and their staff have office suites in either the Dirksen Senate Office Building, the Russell Senate Office Building, or the Hart Senate Office Building in Washington, D.C. In addition to these primary offices, Senators are allocated a single-room office in the United States Capitol, informally known as a hideaway.

== History ==
Senate hideaways date to the earliest occupancy of the U.S. Capitol. When the Capitol opened in 1800, senators were not assigned any workspaces other than their desks on the floor of the Senate chamber and so utilized unused spaces throughout the complex. The opening of the Russell Senate Office Building in 1909, and the United States Supreme Court Building in 1935, resulted in the vacancy of additional space in the Capitol, where senators quickly started squatting.

=== Location and design ===
Hideaway offices are located on all four floors of the Capitol building, including the basement level. Many hideaways are situated in what the Associated Press has described as "ancient nooks" of the centuries-old Capitol. Writing about Barbara Mikulski's hideaway, Politico described it as being in "an unmarked room accessed by corridors and staircases reminiscent of the ones that appear and disappear at Hogwarts". By the end of the 20th century there were about 75 hideaways, but in 2010, the number of hideaways was increased to 100 to accommodate all senators who wish to have one, after basement space opened up from the relocation of a Capitol police office into the newly opened Capitol Visitor Center.

Hideaways are assigned by the Senate Rules Committee based on seniority. The offices assigned to the most senior senators are often lush and expansive. The third floor "Kennedy Hideaway" – so-called as it was long occupied by Senator Edward Kennedy – is considered the most luxurious hideaway to occupy and, according to The Hill, is the "pinnacle of insider prestige". The unusually large space features a fireplace, arched ceilings, and a sweeping view of the National Mall, described by The Hill as being like an "upscale clubroom". The room is entirely private but easily accessible to both the Senate chambers and the press gallery.

By contrast, many junior senators have windowless hideaways in the basement of the Capitol, some not more than 300 square feet (28 m^{2}). In 1991, the basement office of Jeff Bingaman, junior senator from New Mexico who ranked no. 63 on the Senate seniority list, consisted of "a low, fiberboard ceiling, a desk with a cheap office chair on rollers, a refrigerator, a cupboard, and a cot with no bedspread". Hideaway furniture is supplied by the sergeant at arms; however, senators can move in their own furniture.

Hideaways that become vacant after an electoral defeat or due to the death of a sitting senator are reassigned at the beginning of each two-year Congressional term.

=== Use ===
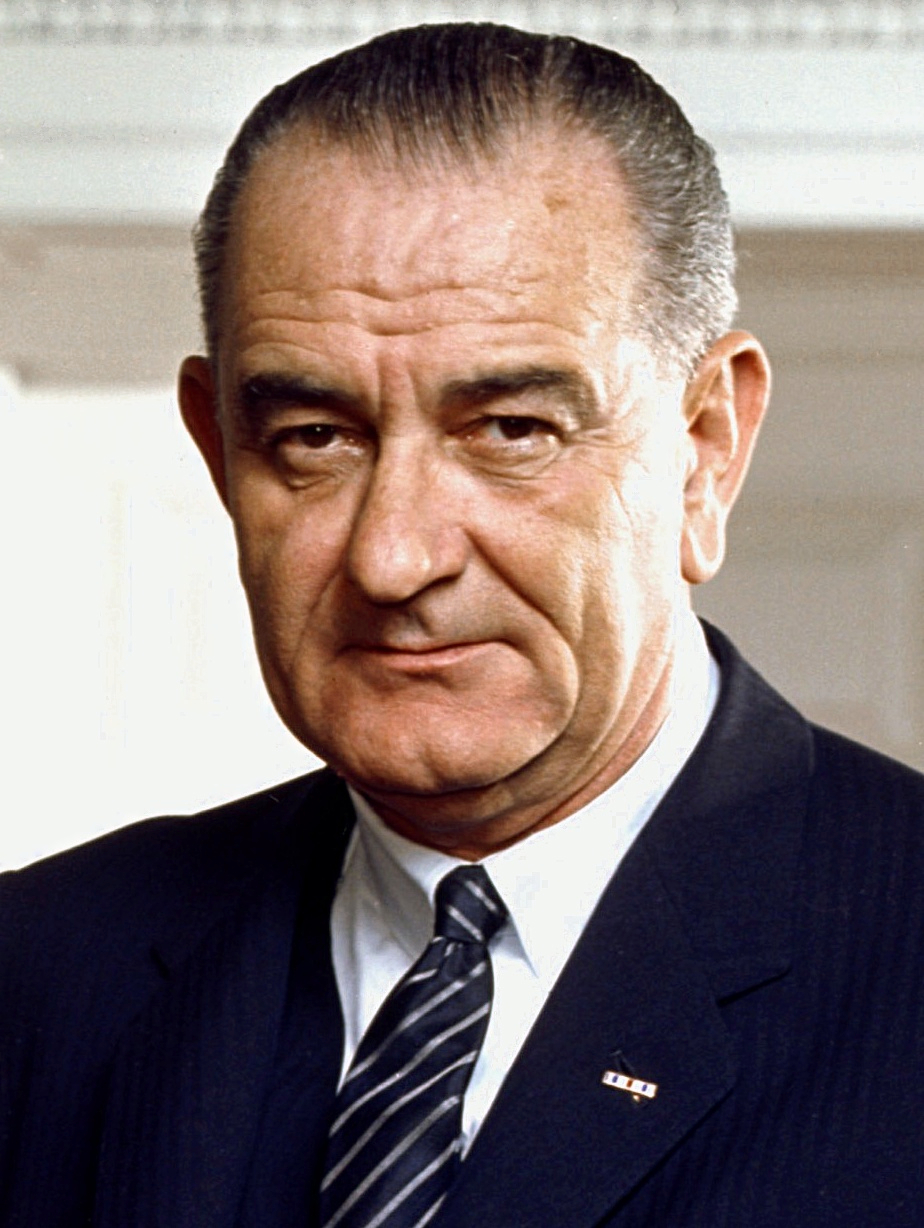
While a member of the Senate, Lyndon Johnson amassed no fewer than five hideaways.

Senators use hideaways to prepare for Senate sessions, take naps, or conduct private or confidential meetings. Senator Daniel Webster, a senator from Massachusetts in the mid-19th century, stocked his hideaway with a private wine collection. Mid-20th century senator Allen J. Ellender of Louisiana installed a kitchen in his hideaway where he enjoyed cooking Creole dishes and praline candies.

Historically, male Senate members have also used hideaways to engage in private sexual liaisons with their mistresses. Bill Moyers recounts one instance of an unnamed senator "stashing" his mistress in a hideaway so well-hidden that it took him several hours to locate her again. During his tenure in the Senate, Lyndon Johnson amassed no fewer than five hideaways where he would receive women. Senator Bob Packwood of Oregon, meanwhile, is alleged to have sexually assaulted a woman in his hideaway.

A number of senators used them to hide during the January 6, 2021, insurrection of the U.S. Capitol Building.

== Secrecy ==
The process for assigning hideaways is, according to The Hill, "secretive". In 2015, a former aide to Harry Reid said that "it's all done by secret handshake. All of a sudden you're told you've got a hideaway and here are the keys". In 2011, when asked about his hideaway by a journalist, Orrin Hatch said he was "not allowed to talk about that". According to the Associated Press, none of several senatorial offices contacted for a 2010 story responded to requests for information about hideaways. The Architect of the Capitol, meanwhile, referred questions to the Senate Rules Committee which, in turn, also did not respond.

The locations of hideaways are unlisted in any official directory, and their doors are marked only by a room number. In some cases, members of the senator's staff are unaware of the location of their hideaway.

== House of Representatives ==
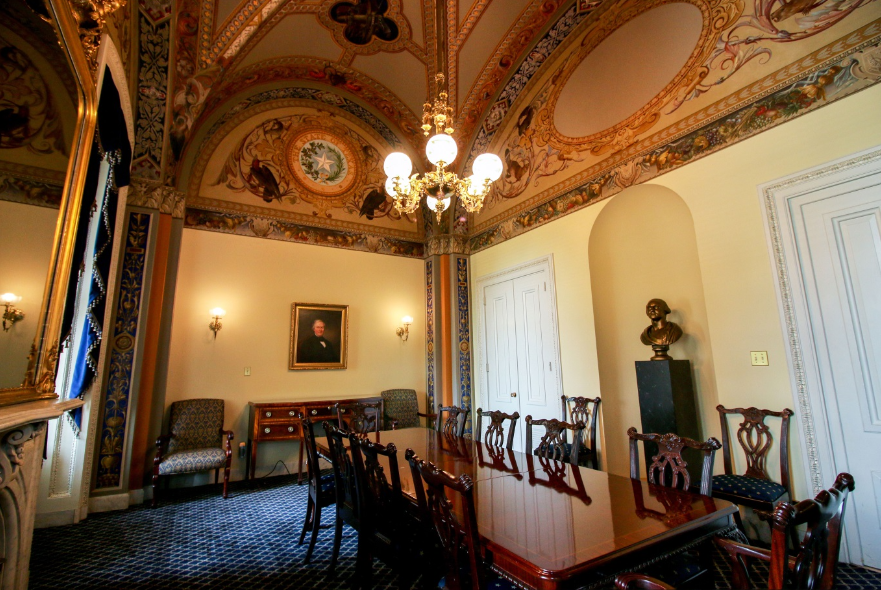
The "Board of Education room", occupied by the Speaker of the House of Representatives

While a few senior members of the U.S. House of Representatives also have hideaways, they are generally reserved for senators. The Speaker of the House has a hideaway traditionally occupied by the Speaker. The first-floor office is colloquially known as the "Board of Education room", though no entity by such a name has ever occupied the space. In 1945 Harry Truman, then serving as U.S. vice president, learned of the death of Franklin Roosevelt while being feted with afternoon cocktails in this hideaway, which was then occupied by Sam Rayburn.

After Kevin McCarthy was removed as Speaker of the House on October 3, 2023, one of the first actions of Patrick McHenry as speaker pro tempore was to evict Nancy Pelosi from her hideaway. Pelosi, a former speaker, called it "a sharp departure from tradition".

== In popular culture ==
In the book Woman First: First Woman, a companion work to the television series Veep, fictional former Senator Selina Meyer writes about the traditions and usage of the hideaways, and her experiences with them.

The hideaways feature prominently in Dan Brown's The Lost Symbol (2009). A character in the novel, Peter Solomon, has a hideaway located in the Capitol's sub-basement identified as SBB13. While the floor plan for the United States Capitol does show a sub-basement, no such room number exists.

Hideaway office number 105 was a significant plot element in the first season of ABC's Designated Survivor (2016).

== See also ==
- Brumidi Corridors
- President's Room
- United States Capitol crypt
