= Daniel Johnson (naval officer) =

American lawyer

Daniel H. Johnson is an attorney in Wake County, North Carolina and a veteran of the United States Navy who received the Navy and Marine Corps Medal for saving the life of a crewmate on the USS Blue Ridge in 1999. As a result of that incident, both of Johnson's legs were amputated below the knee.

Johnson later became General Counsel and Deputy Secretary of the North Carolina Department of Transportation. Governor Josh Stein named him the next Secretary of the department in 2025.

== Military service ==
After graduating from the University of North Carolina at Chapel Hill, Johnson began his service as an officer in the United States Navy. On August 23, 1999, while serving aboard U.S.S. Blue Ridge near South Korea, Johnson risked his own life to save a fellow serviceman. Both survived, but Johnson lost both of his legs below the knee. For his bravery, Johnson received the Navy and Marine Corps Medal, the second highest peacetime medal for heroism.

Johnson is a member of American Legion Post 48.

== Early career ==
After recovering from his injuries, Johnson worked on Capitol Hill for U.S. Senator Max Cleland of Georgia. Johnson then enrolled in law school at UNC, where he met his wife, Creecy. He began his legal career as a prosecutor in Wake County, North Carolina, and quickly worked his way up from handling misdemeanor DWI cases to felony assignments, including drug trafficking, robbery, and murder.

In 2007–2008, Johnson was an attorney at Sigmon, Clark, Mackie, Hutton, Hanvey & Ferrell, P.A. in his hometown of Hickory. He and his wife were members of the First Presbyterian Church of Hickory, where his father has been the senior minister for eighteen years.

== Congressional campaign ==
In 2007, Johnson resigned as a Wake County prosecutor, moved back to his hometown of Hickory, and announced that he would run for election to the United States House of Representatives in North Carolina's 10th congressional district.

After announcing his run for Congress in late 2007, Johnson was able to raise more than $123,000 in campaign funds during the fourth quarter of 2007, an amount the Hickory Daily Record termed "competitive."

Johnson won the May 6, 2008 Democratic primary election with approximately 60 percent of the vote.

The Democratic Congressional Campaign Committee added Johnson to its "Red to Blue" program in September 2008, indicating confidence that Johnson had momentum and could win in November.

The Hickory Daily Record endorsed Johnson on October 31, writing, "We need independent-thinking candidates who will not be guided by their own political aspirations."

He lost to incumbent Rep. Patrick McHenry on November 4, 2008.

In 2009, he opened a solo criminal defense practice in Raleigh. He later formed a new firm, Willis, Johnson and Nelson.
