= Patrick McHenry =

American politician (born 1975)

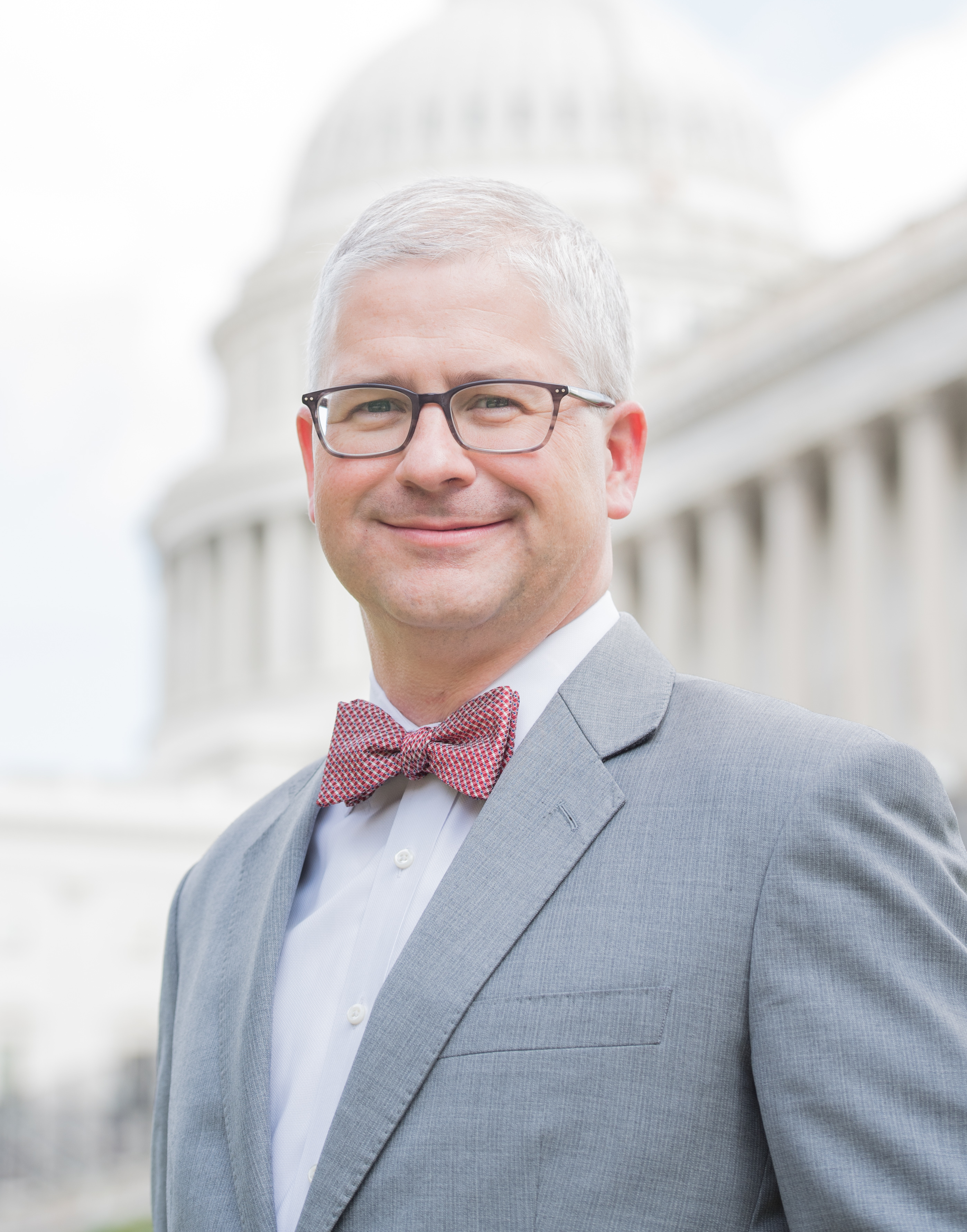
- Official portrait, 2018

Speaker pro tempore of the United States House of Representatives
- Acting; October 3, 2023 – October 25, 2023
- Preceded by: Kevin McCarthy (as Speaker)
- Succeeded by: Mike Johnson (as Speaker)
House positions
Chair of the House Financial Services Committee
In office January 3, 2023 – January 3, 2025
Preceded by	Maxine Waters
Succeeded by	French Hill
Ranking Member of the House Financial Services Committee
In office January 3, 2019 – January 3, 2023
Preceded by	Maxine Waters
Succeeded by	Maxine Waters
House Republican Chief Deputy Whip
In office August 1, 2014 – January 3, 2019
Leader	John Boehner; Paul Ryan
Preceded by	Peter Roskam
Succeeded by	Drew Ferguson

Member of the U.S. House of Representatives from North Carolina's 10th district
- In office January 3, 2005 – January 3, 2025
- Preceded by: Cass Ballenger
- Succeeded by: Pat Harrigan

Member of the North Carolina House of Representatives from the 109th district
- In office January 1, 2003 – January 1, 2005
- Preceded by: Constituency established
- Succeeded by: William Current

Personal details
- Born: Patrick Timothy McHenry; October 22, 1975 (age 51) Gastonia, North Carolina, U.S.
- Party: Republican
- Spouse: Giulia Cangiano (m. 2010)
- Children: 3
- Education: North Carolina State University; Belmont Abbey College (BA)
- McHenry's voice McHenry on former Sen. Jim Broyhill's death. Recorded February 27, 2023

Patrick Timothy McHenry (born October 22, 1975) is an American politician who served as the U.S. representative for North Carolina's 10th congressional district, which includes the communities of Hickory and Mooresville, from 2005 to 2025. He also chaired the House Financial Services Committee from 2023 to 2025. A member of the Republican Party, he served as a member of the North Carolina House of Representatives for one term before being elected to Congress.

McHenry served as a House Republican chief deputy whip from 2014 to 2019 and ranking member of the House Financial Services Committee from 2019 to 2023. McHenry acted as Speaker pro tempore of the House for 22 days following the removal of Kevin McCarthy via a motion to vacate.

McHenry was the dean of the North Carolina's congressional delegation shared with fellow Representative Virginia Foxx.

== Early life, education, and career ==
McHenry was born in Gastonia, North Carolina. He grew up in suburban Gastonia, the son of the owner of the Dixie Lawn Care Company, and attended Ashbrook High School. A Roman Catholic, he was the youngest of five children.

McHenry attended North Carolina State University before transferring to Belmont Abbey College. At Belmont, he founded the school's College Republican chapter, then became chair of the North Carolina Federation of College Republicans and treasurer of the College Republican National Committee.

In 1998, while a junior in college, McHenry ran for the North Carolina House of Representatives. He won the Republican primary but lost the general election.

After earning a B.A. in history in 1999, McHenry worked for the media consulting firm DCI/New Media in Washington, D.C. He was involved in Rick Lazio's campaign in the 2000 United States Senate election in New York; his main project was running a Web site, NotHillary.com. In 2012, he received an honorary M.B.A. in entrepreneurship from the now-closed Yorktown University.

== Early political career ==
In mid-2000, Karl Rove hired McHenry to be the national coalition director for George W. Bush's 2000 presidential campaign. In late 2000 and early 2001, he was a volunteer coordinator for Bush's inaugural committee. After working for six months in 2001 as a special assistant to Elaine Chao, the United States secretary of labor, McHenry returned to North Carolina and ran again for the North Carolina General Assembly, winning in the 2002 election.

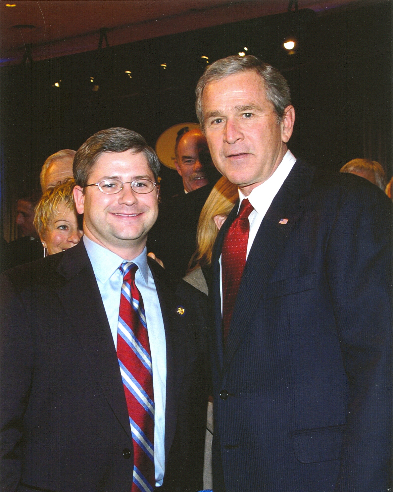
McHenry with President George W. Bush in 2005

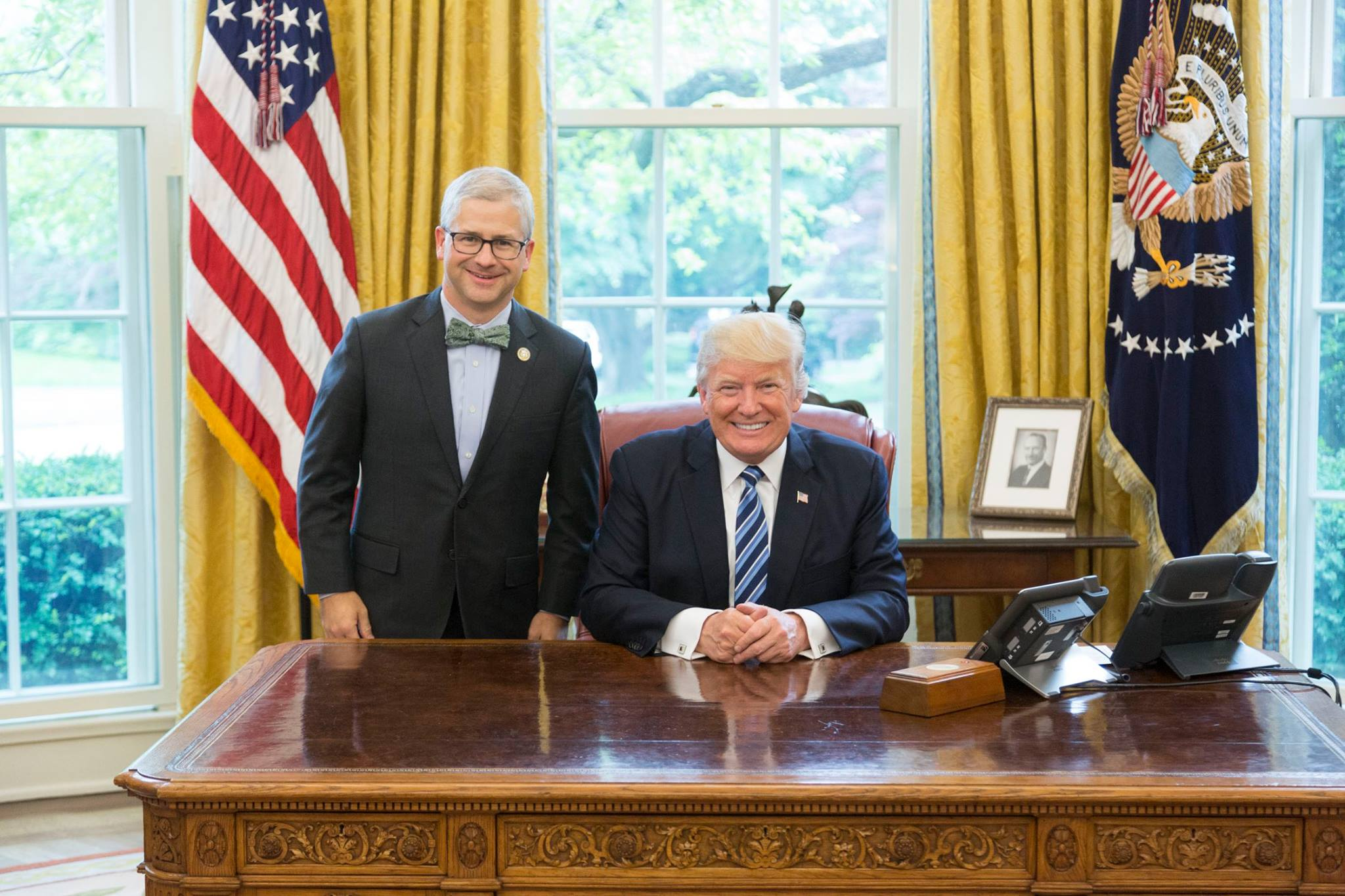
McHenry with President Donald Trump in 2017

A resident of Denver, North Carolina, McHenry represented the state's 109th House district, including constituents in Gaston County, for the 2003–04 session. He sat on the House Appropriations Committee.

== U.S. House of Representatives ==
=== Tenure ===
At age 29, McHenry was the youngest member of the 109th United States Congress. He was a deputy whip and vice chair of finance for the National Republican Congressional Committee's executive committee. McHenry was known on Capitol Hill for his preference for bow ties.

==== Baghdad video ====
McHenry was the subject of discussion in April 2008, regarding a video posted on his congressional campaign website that featured him in the Green Zone in Baghdad, pointing out landmarks and destruction after missile attacks. Veterans' affairs blog VetVoice posted a scathing attack, claiming the video violated operations security. McHenry later removed the video after discussing the information with the Pentagon, which requested he not place the video back online. Lance Sigmon, McHenry's opponent, later called a press conference to demand an investigation of the video's effect on Green Zone troops.

==== Use of PAC funds ====
On April 16, 2008, Roll Call reported that McHenry used funds from his political action committee, "More Conservatives", to fund the defense of former aide Michael Aaron Lay's voter fraud charges incurred during McHenry's 2004 race. McHenry gave Lay $20,000 to pay legal bills on charges brought while Lay worked for him. These expenses were labeled a "Legal Expense Donation", according to Federal Election Commission reports. Lay agreed to a deferred prosecution agreement, which stipulated he complete 100 hours of community service and pay $240.50 in court fees and $250 in community service fees to have the charges dismissed. An employee of the 2004 campaign, Lay lived in McHenry's home in Cherryville, which also served as the campaign headquarters during the 2004 election, and was indicted for voter fraud in McHenry's election, allegedly voting illegally in two separate instances. In response, McHenry claimed the case was part of a "three-year smear campaign" by District Attorney Locke Bell, despite Bell fund-raising for McHenry in previous elections.

==== Elizabeth Warren ====
On May 24, 2011, Elizabeth Warren, appointed by President Obama to oversee the development of the new U.S. Consumer Financial Protection Bureau (CFPB), attended a House subcommittee meeting chaired by McHenry, who invited her because he felt she had given misleading testimony during another hearing. Earlier that day, McHenry had appeared on CNBC and accused Warren of lying to Congress about her involvement in government inquiries into mortgage servicing.

The meeting had several late and last-minute changes, so Warren altered her schedule to accommodate his request. Around 2:15 p.m., McHenry called for a temporary recess to partake in a floor vote. In response, Warren indicated that McHenry's staff had agreed to the 2:15 p.m. closing time to allow her ample time to attend another meeting. McHenry replied, "You had no agreement. You're making this up, Ms. Warren. This is not the case." As Warren and some in the audience reacted with surprise, Representative Elijah Cummings interjected, "Mr. Chairman, I'm trying to be cordial here, but you just accused the lady of lying. I think you need to clear this up with your staff."

The CFPB confirmed the agreement, but McHenry refused to apologize for his remarks to Warren.

The Hickory Daily Record, the largest paper in McHenry's district, called for McHenry to apologize, saying that it was "unacceptable for any member of Congress, especially a subcommittee chairman", to treat a witness in the manner in which he treated Warren.

==== Payday lenders ====
McHenry supported a 2020 rule change by the Trump administration whereby payday lenders would no longer have to check whether prospective borrowers can afford to repay high-interest loans.

==== 2020 presidential election ====
McHenry did not join the majority of Republican members of Congress who sided with the Trump campaign's attempts to overturn the 2020 United States presidential election. He voted to certify Arizona's and Pennsylvania's votes in the 2021 United States Electoral College vote count.

==== Speaker pro tempore ====
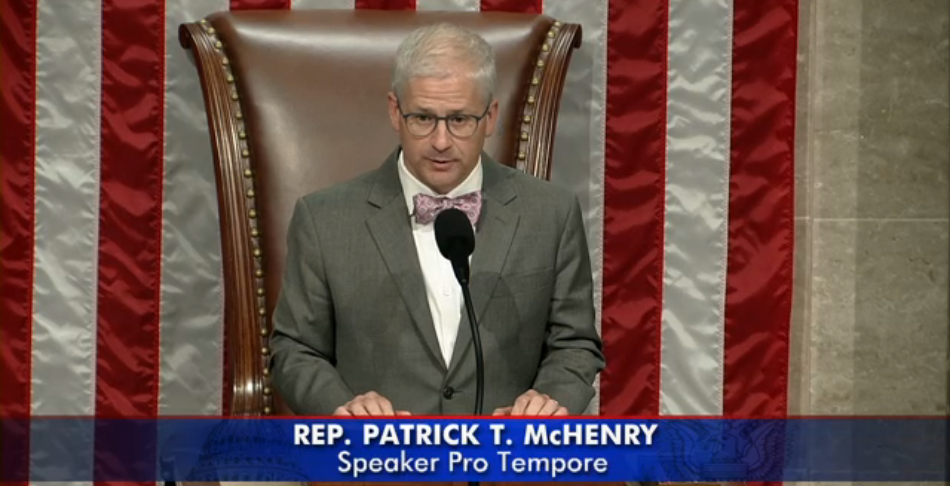
Patrick McHenry addressing the House after assuming pro tempore speakership

On October 3, 2023, McHenry was appointed as Speaker pro tempore of the United States House of Representatives, after a successful motion to vacate led to the removal of Kevin McCarthy from the speakership. Subsequently, he ordered that former speaker of the House Nancy Pelosi and former majority leader Steny Hoyer vacate their Capitol Hill hideaway office. McHenry served as Speaker pro tempore until October 25, when Mike Johnson was elected as Speaker.

On December 5, 2023, McHenry announced that he would not seek reelection in 2024. McHenry had previously announced running for reelection for an 11th term in October following the elections for a new speaker in the House.

=== Committee assignments ===
- Committee on Financial Services (Chair)
  - As Chair of the whole committee, McHenry served as an ex officio member of all subcommittees.
- Committee on Oversight and Government Reform
  - Subcommittee on Health Care, District of Columbia, Census and the National Archives
  - Subcommittee on TARP, Financial Services and Bailouts of Public and Private Programs (Chair)

=== Caucus memberships ===
- Republican Study Committee
- Congressional NextGen 9-1-1 Caucus
- Congressional Taiwan Caucus

== Political campaigns ==
=== 2004 ===
In 2004, after one term in the North Carolina General Assembly, McHenry ran for Congress in the 10th congressional district when nine-term incumbent Cass Ballenger retired. McHenry faced a heavily contested primary and bested his closest opponent, Catawba County sheriff David Huffman, in a runoff by only 85 votes.

In the general election, McHenry won 64% of the popular vote, defeating Democrat Anne Fischer. It was generally thought McHenry's victory in the primary runoff was tantamount to election in November: his district is considered North Carolina's most Republican district, having sent Republicans to represent it since 1963.

=== 2006 ===
In the 2006 election, McHenry defeated Democrat Richard Carsner with almost 62% of the vote.

=== 2008 ===
In 2008, McHenry defeated Lance Sigmon in the Republican primary with 67% of the vote and faced Democrat Daniel Johnson in the general election. Johnson was considered the strongest and best-funded Democrat to run in the district in over 20 years. In part because of this, the Cook Political Report moved the race from "Safe Republican" to "Likely Republican." This meant that in Charlie Cook's opinion, while McHenry still had a considerable advantage, a victory by Johnson could not be ruled out. Shortly after the Cook Political Report's update, Stuart Rothenberg of the Rothenberg Political Report, also a nonpartisan analysis of American politics and elections, addressed the race and indicated his opinion that an upset was unlikely. McHenry defeated Johnson, 58% to 42%.

=== 2010 ===
McHenry defeated Republicans Vance Patterson, Scott Keadle, and David Michael Boldon with 63.09% of the vote to win the primary. He defeated Democrat Jeff Gregory with 71.18% of the vote in the general election.

=== 2012 ===
McHenry defeated Ken Fortenberry and Don Peterson with 72.54% of the vote in the primary. He defeated Democrat Patsy Keever in the general election with 56.99% of the vote.

=== 2014 ===
McHenry defeated Richard Lynch in the primary with 78.04% of the vote. He defeated Democrat Tate MacQueen with 61.02% of the vote in the general election.

=== 2016 ===
McHenry defeated Jeff Gregory, Jeffrey Baker, and Albert Lee Wiley Jr. with 78.42% of the vote in the primary. He defeated Democrat Andy Millard with 63.14% of the vote in the general election.

=== 2018 ===
McHenry defeated a host of fellow Republicans in the primary with 70.72% of the vote. He defeated Democrat David Wilson Brown with 59.29% percent of the vote in the general election.

=== 2020 ===
McHenry defeated David Johnson and Ralf Walters in the primary with 71.67% of the vote. He defeated Democrat David Parker with 68.91% of the vote in the general election.

=== 2022 ===
McHenry defeated five opponents in the primary with 68.1% of the vote. He defeated Democrat Pam Genant with 72.6% of the vote in the general election.

== Personal life ==
McHenry has been married to Giulia Cangiano since 2010. They live in Denver, North Carolina, and have three children.

U.S. House of Representatives
Preceded by Cass Ballenger	Member of the U.S. House of Representatives from North Carolina's 10th congressional district 2005–2025	Succeeded by Pat Harrigan
Preceded by Maxine Waters	Ranking Member of the House Financial Services Committee; 2019–2023	Succeeded by Maxine Waters
Preceded by Maxine Waters	Chair of the House Financial Services Committee; 2023–2025	Succeeded by French Hill
Honorary titles
Preceded by Adam Putnam	Baby of the House; 2005–2009	Succeeded by Aaron Schock
Party political offices
Preceded by Peter Roskam	House Republican Chief Deputy Whip; 2014–2019	Succeeded by Drew Ferguson
Political offices
Preceded by Kevin McCarthy as Speaker of the U.S. House of Representatives	Speaker pro tempore of the United States House of Representatives; 2023	Succeeded by Mike Johnson as Speaker of the U.S. House of Representatives
U.S. order of precedence (ceremonial)
Preceded by Mel Watt as Former U.S. Representative	Order of precedence of the United States as Former U.S. Representative	Succeeded by Ed Whitfield as Former U.S. Representative
