= 2014 United States House of Representatives elections in North Carolina =

- November 4, 2014

All 13 North Carolina seats in the United States House of Representatives
	Majority party	Minority party
Party	Republican	Democratic
Last election	9	4
Seats won	10	3
Seat change	▲1	▼1
Popular vote	1,555,364	1,234,027
Percentage	55.39%	43.95%
Swing	▲6.64%	▼6.65%

Republican
50–60%
60–70%
70–80%
80–90%
90–100%
Democratic
40–50%
50–60%
60–70%
70–80%

The 2014 United States House of Representatives elections in North Carolina were held on Tuesday, November 4, 2014, to elect the 13 U.S. representatives from the state of North Carolina, one from each of the state's 13 congressional districts. The elections coincided with other elections to the United States Senate and House of Representatives and various state and local elections, including an election to the U.S. Senate.

Primary elections were held on Tuesday, May 6, 2014. In primaries in which no candidate won more than 40% of the vote (the Democratic primary in the 5th district and the Republican primary in the 6th district), second primary elections (runoffs) were held between the top two candidates on July 15, 2014.

== Overview ==
=== Statewide ===
Party	Candidates	Votes		Seats		
Party	Candidates	No.	%	No.	+/–	%
Republican	13	1,555,364	55.39	10	▲1	76.92
Democratic	12	1,234,027	43.95	3	▼1	23.08
Libertarian	1	7,850	0.28	0	Steady	0.00
Write-In	2	10,757	0.38	0	Steady	0.00
Total	28	2,807,998	100.0	13	Steady	100.0

Popular vote
Republican	55.39%
Democratic	43.95%
Libertarian	0.28%
Other	0.38%

House seats
Republican	76.92%
Democratic	23.08%
Libertarian	0.00%
Other	0.00%

=== By district ===
Results of the 2014 United States House of Representatives elections in North Carolina by district:

District	Republican		Democratic		Others		Total		Result
District	Votes	%	Votes	%	Votes	%	Votes	%	Result
District 1	55,990	26.62%	154,333	73.38%	0	0.00%	210,323	100.00%	Democratic hold
District 2	122,128	58.83%	85,479	41.17%	0	0.00%	207,607	100.00%	Republican hold
District 3	139,415	67.81%	66,182	32.19%	0	0.00%	205,597	100.00%	Republican hold
District 4	57,416	25.25%	169,946	75.75%	0	0.00%	227,362	100.00%	Democratic hold
District 5	139,279	61.02%	88,973	38.98%	0	0.00%	228,252	100.00%	Republican hold
District 6	147,312	58.67%	103,758	41.33%	0	0.00%	251,070	100.00%	Republican hold
District 7	134,431	59.35%	84,054	37.11%	8,019	3.54%	226,504	100.00%	Republican gain
District 8	121,568	64.86%	65,854	35.14%	0	0.00%	187,422	100.00%	Republican hold
District 9	163,080	93.90%	0	0.00%	10,588	6.10%	173,668	100.00%	Republican hold
District 10	133,504	61.02%	85,292	38.98%	0	0.00%	218,796	100.00%	Republican hold
District 11	144,682	62.90%	85,342	37.10%	0	0.00%	230,024	100.00%	Republican hold
District 12	42,568	24.65%	130,096	75.35%	0	0.00%	172,664	100.00%	Democratic hold
District 13	153,991	57.31%	114,718	42.69%	0	0.00%	268,709	100.00%	Republican hold
Total	1,555,364	55.39%	1,234,027	43.95%	18,607	0.66%	2,807,998	100.00%	

== District 1 ==
2014 North Carolina's 1st congressional district election
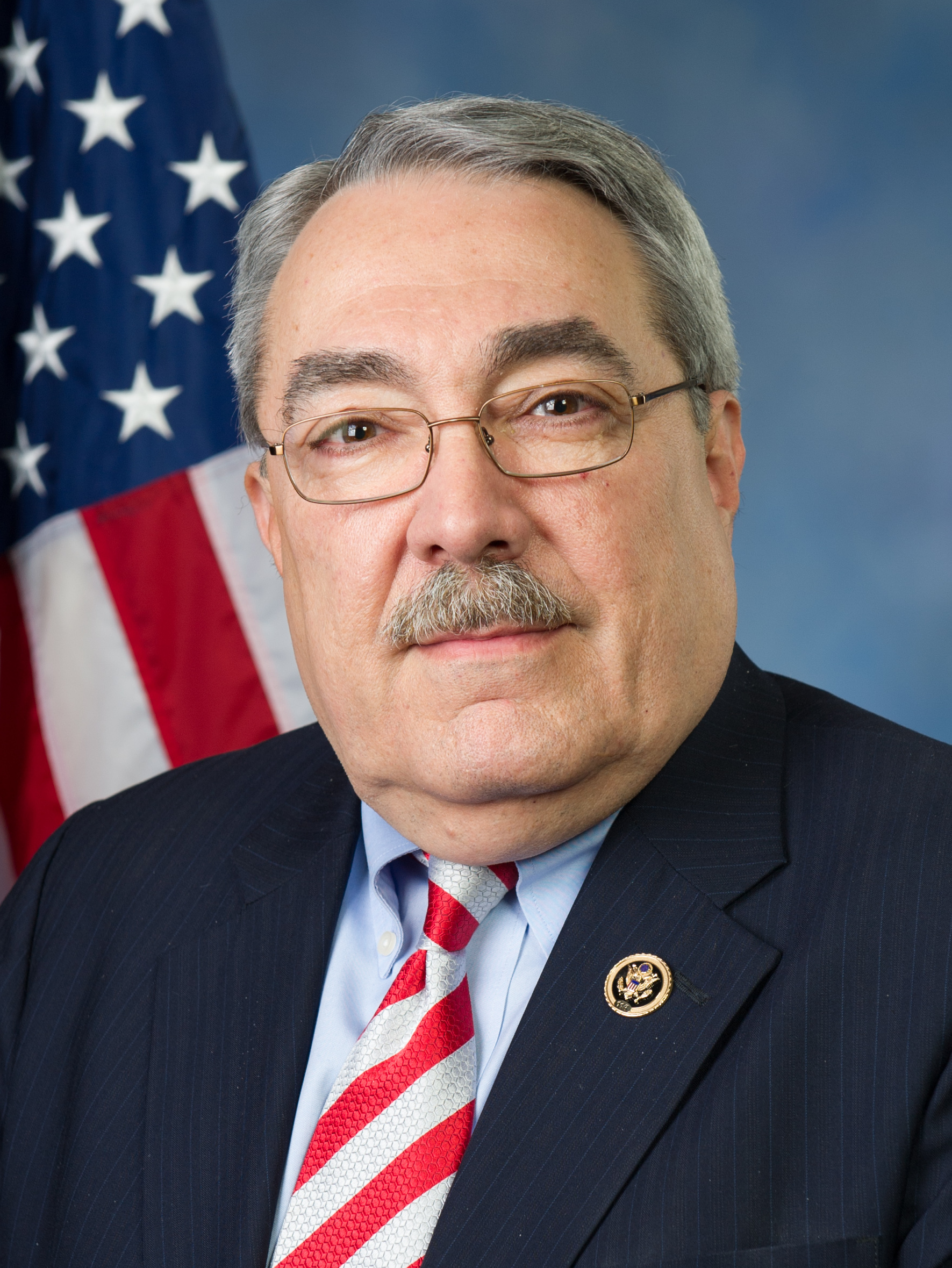

Nominee	G. K. Butterfield	Arthur Rich
Party	Democratic	Republican
Popular vote	240,661	55,990
Percentage	73.4%	26.6%
- County results Butterfield: 50–60% 60–70% 70–80% 80–90%
U.S. Representative before election
G. K. Butterfield
Democratic
Elected U.S. Representative
G. K. Butterfield
Democratic

The 1st district is located in Northeastern North Carolina and includes towns such as Durham, Elizabeth City, Henderson, Roanoke Rapids, Rocky Mount, Goldsboro and New Bern. The incumbent was Democrat G. K. Butterfield, who has represented the district since 2004. He was re-elected with 75% of the vote in 2012, and the district has a PVI of D+19.

=== Democratic primary ===
==== Candidates ====
===== Nominee =====
- G. K. Butterfield, incumbent U.S. Representative

===== Eliminated in primary =====
- Dan Whittacre, high school teacher, HHS federal agent, and candidate for this district in 2012

===== Withdrawn =====
- Rodward Hewlin

==== Results ====
Democratic primary results
Party	Candidate	Votes	%
Democratic	G. K. Butterfield (incumbent)	60,847	81.1
Democratic	Dan Whittacre	14,147	18.9
Total votes		74,994	100.0

=== Republican primary ===
==== Candidates ====
===== Nominee =====
- Arthur Rich, accountant and candidate for lieutenant governor in 2012

===== Eliminated in primary =====
- Brent Shypulefski

==== Results ====
Republican primary results
Party	Candidate	Votes	%
Republican	Arthur Rich	5,519	51.3
Republican	Brent Shypulefski	5,232	48.7
Total votes		10,751	100.0

=== General election ===
==== Endorsements ====
G. K. Butterfield (D)

Labor unions

- AFL-CIO
- International Brotherhood of Boilermakers
- National Association of Letter Carriers
- North Carolina Association of Educators

Organizations

- Human Rights Campaign
- Sierra Club

Newspapers

- Indy Week

==== Polling ====
Poll source	Date(s) administered	Sample size	Margin of error	G. K. Butterfield (D)	Arthur Rich (R)	Undecided
New York Times/CBS News Battleground Tracker	October 16–23, 2014	84	± 17%	58%	22%	20%

==== Predictions ====
Source	Ranking	As of
The Cook Political Report	Safe D	November 3, 2014
Rothenberg	Safe D	October 24, 2014
Sabato's Crystal Ball	Safe D	October 30, 2014
RCP	Safe D	November 2, 2014
Daily Kos Elections	Safe D	November 4, 2014

==== Results ====
North Carolina's 1st congressional district, 2014
Party	Candidate	Votes	%
Democratic	G. K. Butterfield (incumbent)	154,333	73.4
Republican	Arthur Rich	55,990	26.6
Total votes		210,323	100.0
Democratic hold			

== District 2 ==
2014 North Carolina's 2nd congressional district election
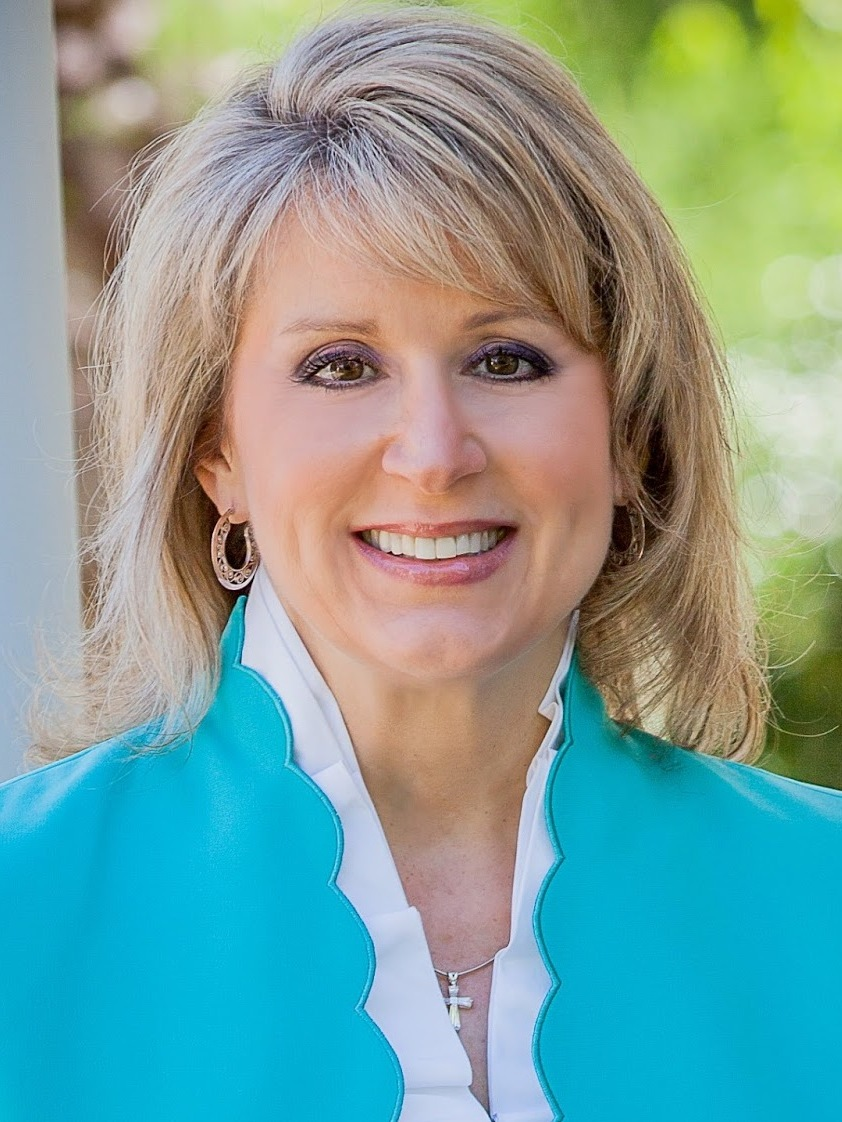

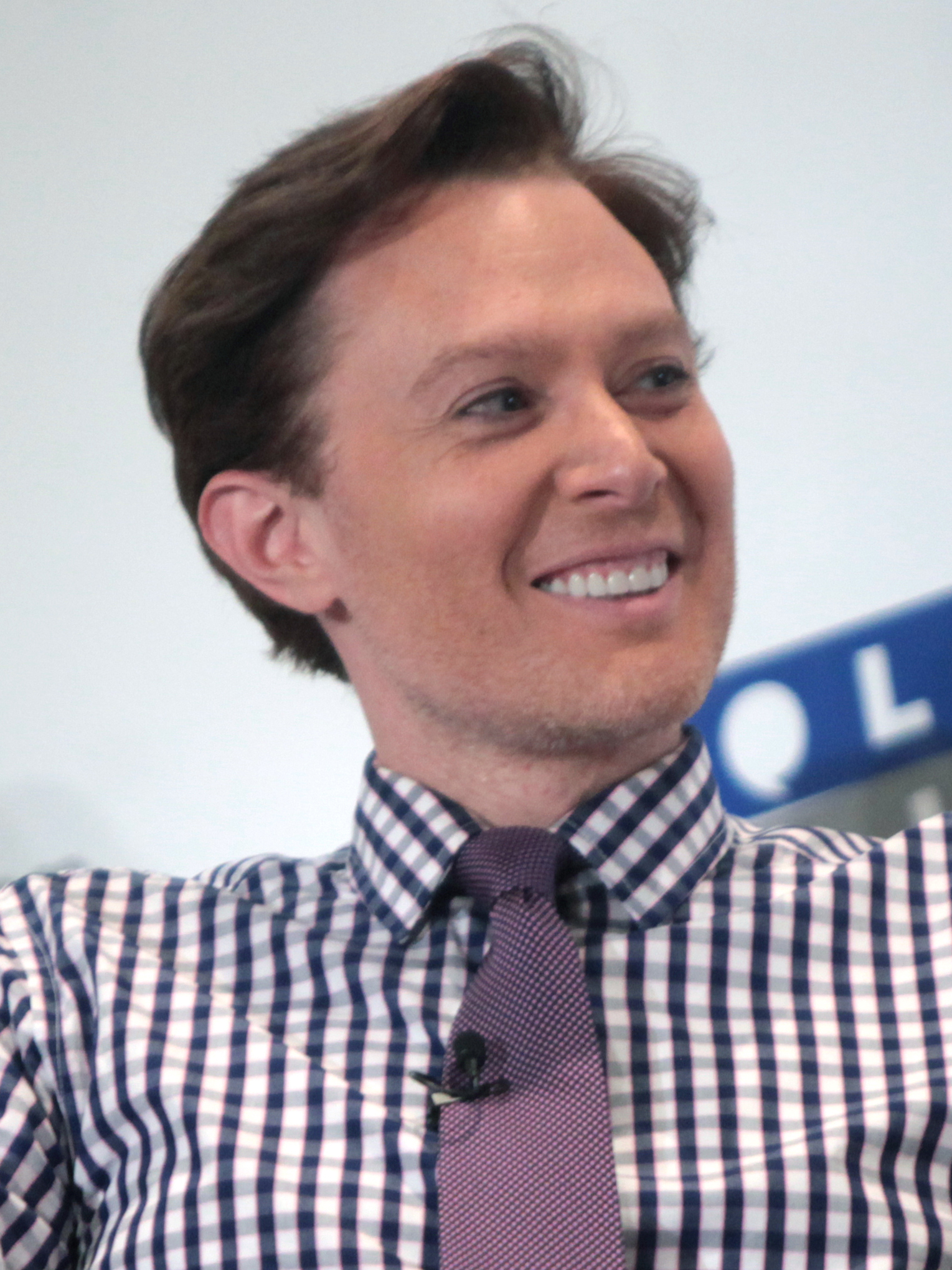
Nominee	Renee Ellmers	Clay Aiken
Party	Republican	Democratic
Popular vote	122,128	85,479
Percentage	58.8%	41.2%
- County results Ellmers: 50–60% 60–70% 70–80% Aiken: 50–60%
U.S. Representative before election
Renee Ellmers
Republican
Elected U.S. Representative
Renee Ellmers
Republican

The 2nd district is located in central North Carolina and includes all or parts of Alamance, Chatham, Cumberland, Harnett, Hoke, Lee, Moore, and Wake counties. The incumbent was Republican Renee Ellmers, who had represented the district since 2011. She was re-elected with 56% of the vote in 2012, and the district has a PVI of R+10.

Ellmers had considered running for the U.S. Senate but instead ran for re-election.

=== Republican primary ===
==== Candidates ====
===== Nominee =====
- Renee Ellmers, incumbent U.S. Representative

===== Eliminated in primary =====
- Frank Roche, conservative internet talk show host and lecturer in economics at Elon University, candidate for North Carolina's 4th congressional district in 2010 & candidate for State Treasurer in 2012

===== Declined =====
- Jim Duncan, chair of the Chatham County Republican Party, co-founder of the grassroots organization Coalition for American Principles

==== Results ====
Republican primary results
Party	Candidate	Votes	%
Republican	Renee Ellmers (incumbent)	21,412	58.7
Republican	Frank Roche	15,045	41.3
Total votes		36,457	100.0

=== Democratic primary ===
==== Candidates ====
===== Nominee =====
- Clay Aiken, singer, actor and activist

===== Eliminated in primary =====
- Keith Crisco, former North Carolina Secretary of Commerce
- Toni Morris, professional counselor and candidate for the district in 2012

===== Withdrawn =====
- Houston Barnes, attorney (endorsed Aiken)

==== Results ====
The results were too close to call even a week later, with Crisco only narrowly behind Aiken, who was only just above the 40% necessary to avoid a runoff. As both candidates were waiting for the results to be certified (this was to be done May 13, 2014), Crisco died suddenly on May 12, after suffering a fall in his home. He was 71. Though Crisco had initially said he would not concede, he changed his mind and had planned to concede on May 13.

Democratic primary results
Party	Candidate	Votes	%
Democratic	Clay Aiken	11,678	40.9
Democratic	Keith Crisco	11,288	39.5
Democratic	Toni Morris	5,616	19.6
Total votes		28,582	100.0

=== General election ===
==== Debate ====
2014 North Carolina's 2nd congressional district debate
No.	Date	Host	Moderator	Link	Republican	Democratic
Key: P Participant A Absent N Not invited I Invited W Withdrawn						
Key: P Participant A Absent N Not invited I Invited W Withdrawn					Renee Ellmers	Clay Aiken
1	Oct. 6, 2014	Capital Broadcasting Company; North Carolina Bankers Association	David Crabtree		P	P

==== Endorsements ====
Renee Ellmers (R)

Organizations

- National Association of Women Business Owners
- National Federation of Independent Business
- National Right to Life Committee
- NRA Political Victory Fund
Clay Aiken (D)

U.S. Representatives

- Brad Miller, U.S. representative from North Carolina's 13th congressional district (2001–2013)

State legislators

- Duane Hall, state representative (2013–present)
- Eric L. Mansfield, former state senator from the 21st district (2011–2013) and candidate for Lieutenant Governor of North Carolina in 2012

Labor unions

- AFL–CIO
- American Postal Workers Union
- International Brotherhood of Boilermakers
- International Brotherhood of Electrical Workers
- North Carolina Association of Educators

Organizations

- American Association for Justice
- Democratic Congressional Campaign Committee "Emerging Races" Program
- Equality North Carolina
- Human Rights Campaign
- National Organization for Women
- Victory Fund

Newspapers

- Indy Week
- The News & Observer
- The Pilot

Local officials

- Bill Bell, Mayor of Durham (2001–present)

Individuals

- Mark Wylea Erwin, former United States Ambassador to Mauritius & Seychelles (1999–2001)
- Jeanette W. Hyde, former United States Ambassador to Barbados (1994–1998)

==== Polling ====
Poll source	Date(s) administered	Sample size	Margin of error	Renee Ellmers (R)	Clay Aiken (D)	Undecided
New York Times/CBS News Battleground Tracker	October 16–23, 2014	132	± 13%	59%	36%	4%
Civitas	September 26–28, 2014	400	± 5%	47%	39%	14%

==== Predictions ====
Source	Ranking	As of
The Cook Political Report	Safe R	November 3, 2014
Rothenberg	Safe R	October 24, 2014
Sabato's Crystal Ball	Safe R	October 30, 2014
RCP	Safe R	November 2, 2014
Daily Kos Elections	Safe R	November 4, 2014

==== Results ====
North Carolina's 2nd congressional district, 2014
Party	Candidate	Votes	%
Republican	Renee Ellmers (incumbent)	122,128	58.8
Democratic	Clay Aiken	85,479	41.2
Total votes		207,607	100.0
Republican hold			

== District 3 ==
2014 North Carolina's 3rd congressional district election
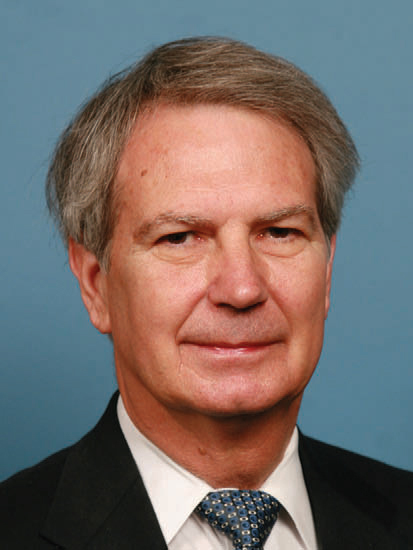

Nominee	Walter B. Jones Jr.	Marshall Adame
Party	Republican	Democratic
Popular vote	139,415	66,182
Percentage	67.8%	32.2%
- County results Jones: 50–60% 60–70% 70–80% Adame: 70–80%
U.S. Representative before election
Walter B. Jones Jr.
Republican
Elected U.S. Representative
Walter B. Jones Jr.
Republican

The 3rd district is located on the Atlantic coast of North Carolina. It covers the Outer Banks and the counties adjacent to the Pamlico Sound. The incumbent was Republican Walter B. Jones, Jr., who had represented the district since 1995. He was re-elected with 63% of the vote in 2012, and the district has a PVI of R+11.

=== Republican primary ===
Taylor Griffin, a one-time aide to United States Senator Jesse Helms and to President George W. Bush, ran in the primary against Jones. Griffin sold his consulting firm in Washington, D.C., and moved back to New Bern.

==== Candidates ====
===== Nominee =====
- Walter Jones, incumbent U.S. Representative

===== Eliminated in primary =====
- Taylor Griffin, former aide to Senator Jesse Helms and President George W. Bush
- Albin "Big Al" Novinec

===== Declined =====
- Scott Dacey, Craven County Commissioner

Jason Thigpen, a U.S. Army veteran and founder of the Student Veterans Advocacy Group, first announced that he would challenge Jones in the Republican primary, but then left the Republican Party and said he would run as a Democrat. Ultimately, he did not file to run for any party's nomination.

==== Endorsements ====
Taylor Griffin

State officials

- Sarah Palin, Governor of Alaska (2006–2009) and nominee for Vice President in 2008

Organizations

- Emergency Committee for Israel
Walter B. Jones

U.S. Representatives

- Ron Paul, U.S. representative from Texas's 14th congressional district (1976–1977, 1979–1985, 1997–2013)

Organizations

- Republican Liberty Caucus

Individuals

- Dorothy Helms, widow of U.S. Senator Jesse Helms

==== Results ====
Republican primary results
Party	Candidate	Votes	%
Republican	Walter B. Jones, Jr. (incumbent)	22,616	50.9
Republican	Taylor Griffin	20,024	45.1
Republican	Albin "Big Al" Novinec	1,798	4.0
Total votes		44,438	100.0

=== Democratic primary ===
==== Candidates ====
===== Nominee =====
- Marshall Adame, retired U.S. Marine, former U.S. diplomat in Iraq, former member of the Congressional Commission on Wartime Contracting in Iraq and Afghanistan and former U.S. Basra International Airport Director

=== General election ===
==== Endorsements ====
Walter B. Jones (R)

U.S. Representatives

- Ron Paul, U.S. representative from Texas's 14th congressional district (1976–1977, 1979–1985, 1997–2013)

Organizations

- J Street
- National Federation of Independent Business
- National Right to Life Committee
- NRA Political Victory Fund
- Republican Liberty Caucus

Individuals

- Dorothy Helms, widow of U.S. Senator Jesse Helms
Marshall Adame (D)

Labor unions

- AFL-CIO

Organizations

- Equality North Carolina

==== Polling ====
Poll source	Date(s) administered	Sample size	Margin of error	Walter B. Jones, Jr. (R)	Marshall Adame (D)	Undecided
New York Times/CBS News Battleground Tracker	October 16–23, 2014	128	± 19%	60%	37%	3%

==== Predictions ====
Source	Ranking	As of
The Cook Political Report	Safe R	November 3, 2014
Rothenberg	Safe R	October 24, 2014
Sabato's Crystal Ball	Safe R	October 30, 2014
RCP	Safe R	November 2, 2014
Daily Kos Elections	Safe R	November 4, 2014

==== Results ====
North Carolina's 3rd congressional district, 2014
Party	Candidate	Votes	%
Republican	Walter B. Jones, Jr. (incumbent)	139,415	67.8
Democratic	Marshall Adame	66,182	32.2
Total votes		205,597	100.0
Republican hold			

== District 4 ==
2014 North Carolina's 4th congressional district election
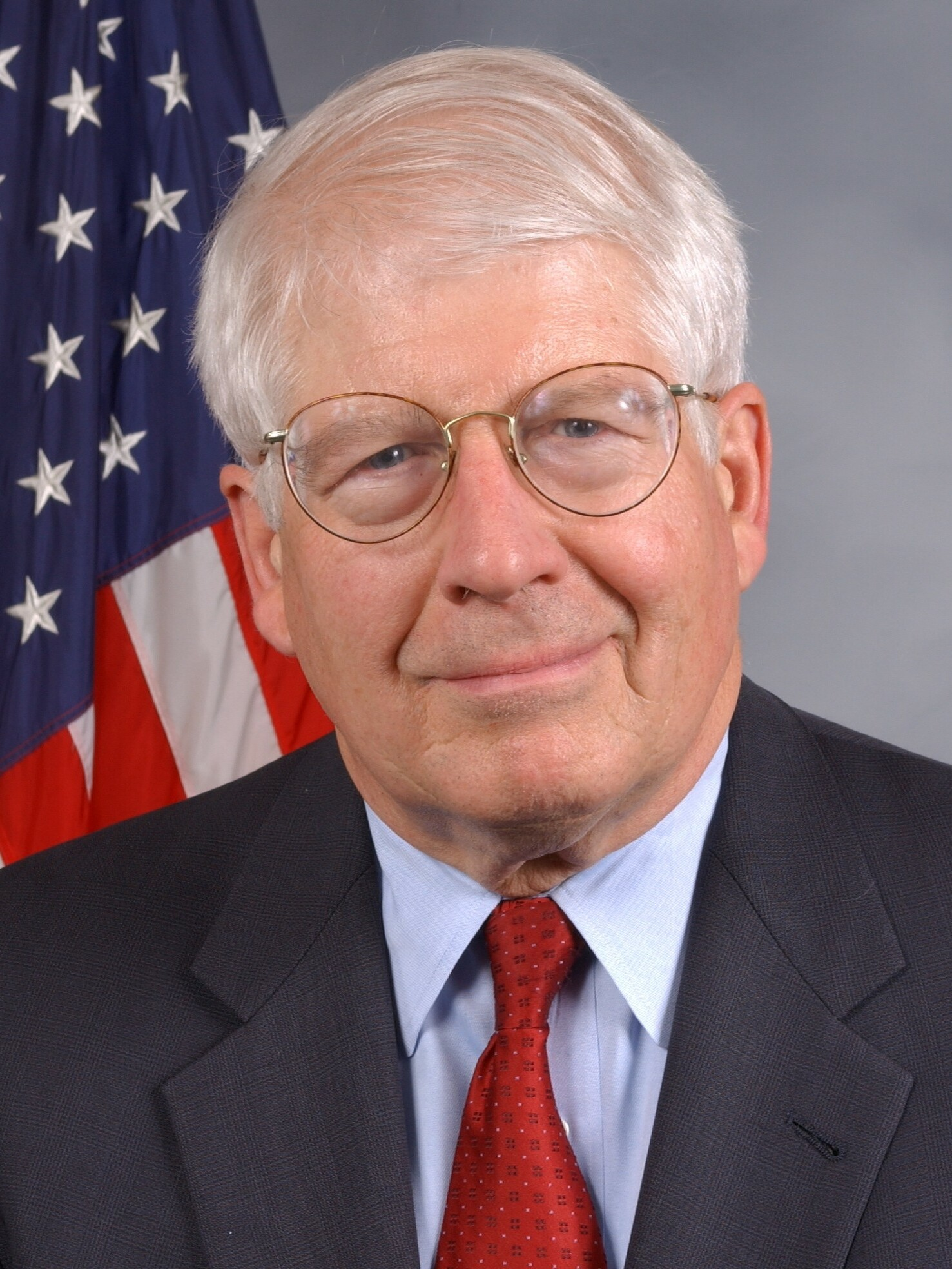

Nominee	David Price	Paul Wright
Party	Democratic	Republican
Popular vote	169,946	57,416
Percentage	74.2%	25.2%
- County results Price: 50–60% 60–70% 70–80% 80–90%
U.S. Representative before election
David Price
Democratic
Elected U.S. Representative
David Price
Democratic

The 4th district is located in northern North Carolina and includes Orange, Durham, Harnett, Chatham and Wake counties. The incumbent was Democrat David Price, who had represented the district since 1997, and previously represented it from 1987 to 1995. He was re-elected with 74% of the vote in 2012, and the district has a PVI of D+20.

=== Democratic primary ===
==== Candidates ====
===== Nominee =====
- David Price, incumbent U.S. Representative

=== Republican primary ===
==== Candidates ====
===== Nominee =====
- Paul Wright, attorney, former District Court & Superior Court judge and candidate for Governor of North Carolina in 2012

=== General election ===
==== Endorsements ====
David Price (D)

Labor unions

- AFL-CIO
- International Brotherhood of Boilermakers
- National Association of Letter Carriers
- North Carolina Association of Educators

Organizations

- Equality North Carolina
- Everytown for Gun Safety
- Human Rights Campaign
- J Street
- Sierra Club

Newspapers

- Indy Week
- The News & Observer

==== Polling ====
Poll source	Date(s) administered	Sample size	Margin of error	David Price (D)	Paul Wright (R)	Undecided
New York Times/CBS News Battleground Tracker	October 16–23, 2014	158	± 12%	73%	21%	6%

==== Predictions ====
Source	Ranking	As of
The Cook Political Report	Safe D	November 3, 2014
Rothenberg	Safe D	October 24, 2014
Sabato's Crystal Ball	Safe D	October 30, 2014
RCP	Safe D	November 2, 2014
Daily Kos Elections	Safe D	November 4, 2014

==== Results ====
North Carolina's 4th congressional district, 2014
Party	Candidate	Votes	%
Democratic	David Price (incumbent)	169,946	74.8
Republican	Paul Wright	57,416	25.2
Total votes		227,362	100.0
Democratic hold			

== District 5 ==
2014 North Carolina's 5th congressional district election
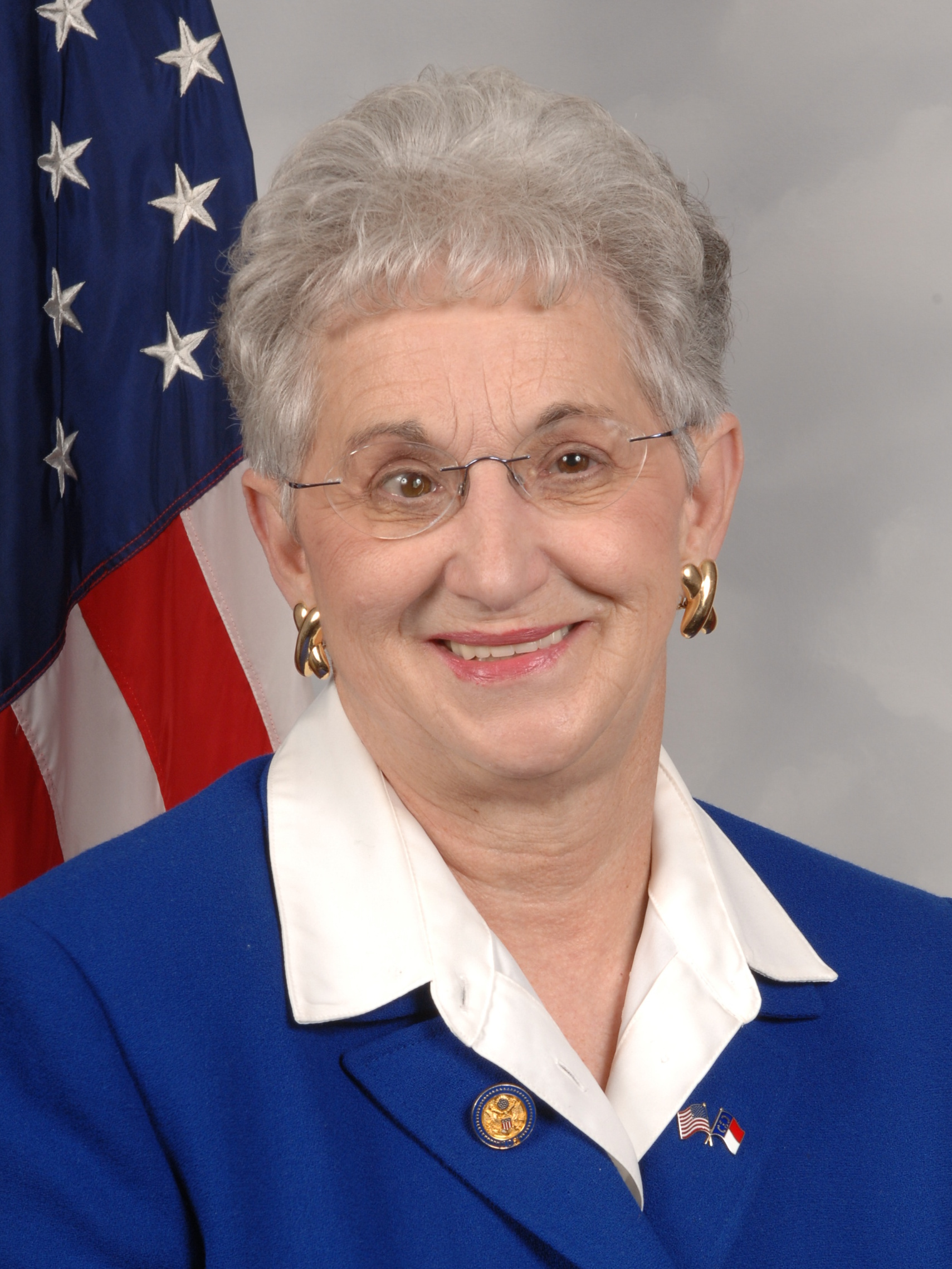

Nominee	Virginia Foxx	Josh Brannon
Party	Republican	Democratic
Popular vote	139,279	88,973
Percentage	61.0%	39.0%
- County results Foxx: 50–60% 60–70% 70–80% Brannon: 50–60%
U.S. Representative before election
Virginia Foxx
Republican
Elected U.S. Representative
Virginia Foxx
Republican

The 5th district is located in northwestern North Carolina, from the Appalachian Mountains to the Piedmont Triad and includes Watauga, Ashe, Wilkes, Alexander, Iredell, Davie, Yadkin, Surry, Alleghany, Forsyth, Stokes and Reckingham counties. The incumbent was Republican Virginia Foxx, who had represented the district since 2005. She was re-elected with 58% of the vote in 2012, and the district has a PVI of R+11.

Foxx had considered running for the U.S. Senate but instead ran for re-election.

=== Republican primary ===
==== Candidates ====
===== Nominee =====
- Virginia Foxx, incumbent U.S. Representative

===== Eliminated in primary =====
- Philip Doyle

==== Results ====
Republican primary results
Party	Candidate	Votes	%
Republican	Virginia Foxx (incumbent)	49,572	75.4
Republican	Philip Doyle	16,175	24.6
Total votes		65,747	100.0

=== Democratic primary ===
==== Candidates ====
===== Nominee =====
- Joshua Brannon, software developer

===== Eliminated in primary =====
- Gardenia Henley, retired U.S. Agency for International Development auditor, candidate for state representative in 2010, for governor in 2012 and for Mayor of Winston-Salem in 2013
- Michael W. Holleman
- Will Stinson, candidate for state representative in 2012

==== Results ====
Democratic primary results
Party	Candidate	Votes	%
Democratic	Joshua Brannon	8,010	33.0
Democratic	Gardenia Henley	6,417	26.5
Democratic	Michael W. Holleman	5,618	23.2
Democratic	Will Stinson	4,189	17.3
Total votes		24,234	100.0

==== Runoff ====
Because Brannon did not secure more than 40 percent of the vote, he and Henley advanced to a runoff.

Democratic primary runoff results
Party	Candidate	Votes	%
Democratic	Joshua Brannon	2,748	65.6
Democratic	Gardenia Henley	1,443	34.4
Total votes		4,191	100.0

=== General election ===
==== Endorsements ====
Virginia Foxx (R)

Organizations

- National Federation of Independent Business
- NRA Political Victory Fund
- National Right to Life Committee
Joshua Brannon (D)

Organizations

- Equality North Carolina

==== Polling ====
Poll source	Date(s) administered	Sample size	Margin of error	Virginia Foxx (R)	Joshua Brannon (D)	Undecided
New York Times/CBS News Battleground Tracker	October 16–23, 2014	140	± 12%	58%	29%	12%

==== Predictions ====
Source	Ranking	As of
The Cook Political Report	Safe R	November 3, 2014
Rothenberg	Safe R	October 24, 2014
Sabato's Crystal Ball	Safe R	October 30, 2014
RCP	Safe R	November 2, 2014
Daily Kos Elections	Safe R	November 4, 2014

==== Results ====
North Carolina's 5th congressional district, 2014
Party	Candidate	Votes	%
Republican	Virginia Foxx (incumbent)	139,279	61.0
Democratic	Joshua Brannon	88,973	39.0
Total votes		228,252	100.0
Republican hold			

== District 6 ==
2014 North Carolina's 6th congressional district election
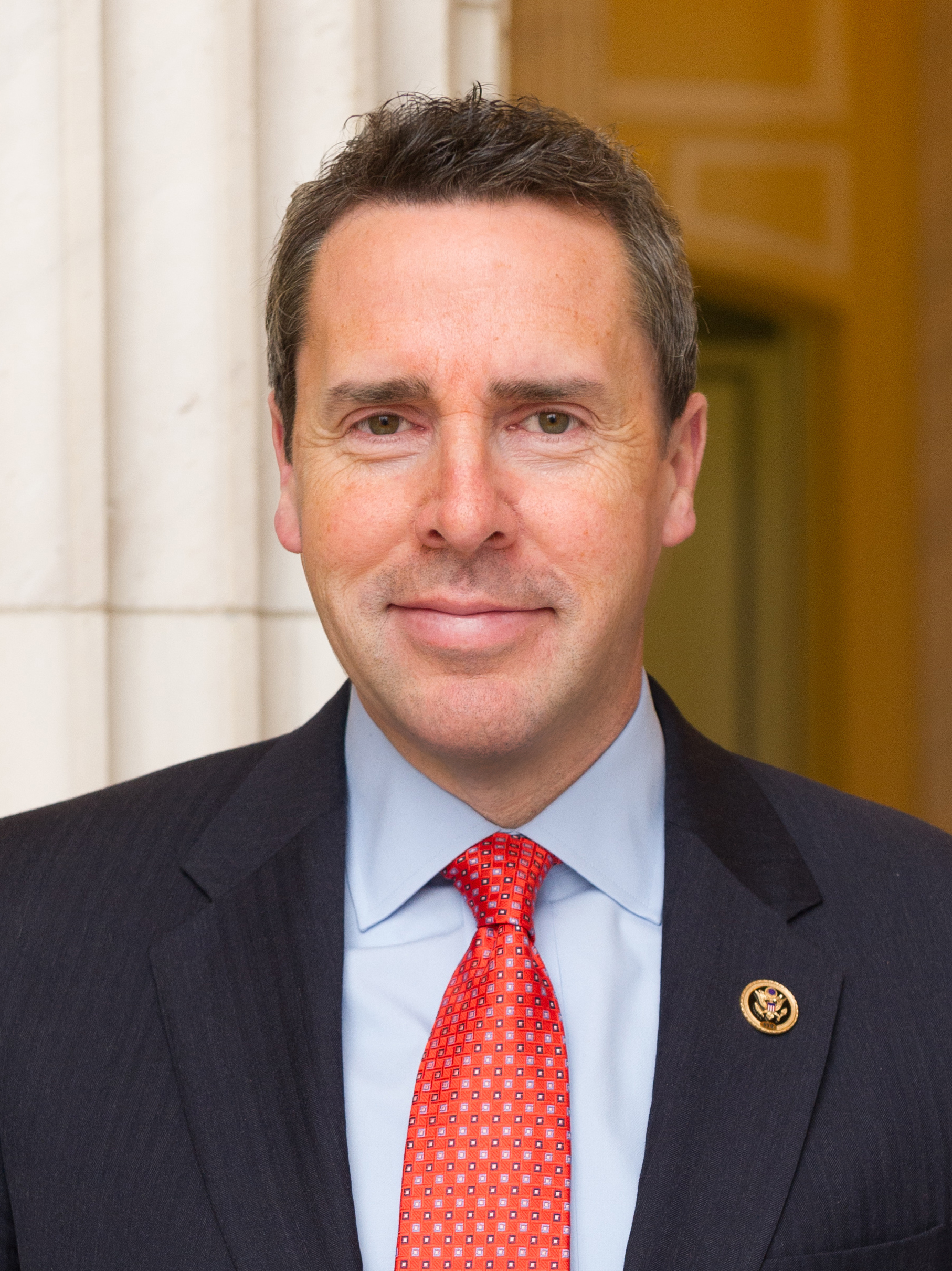

Nominee	Mark Walker	Laura Fjeld
Party	Republican	Democratic
Popular vote	147,312	103,758
Percentage	58.7%	41.3%
- County results Walker: 50–60% 60–70% 70–80% Fjeld: 50–60%
U.S. Representative before election
Howard Coble
Republican
Elected U.S. Representative
Mark Walker
Republican

The 6th district is located in northern North Carolina and includes all of Caswell, Person, Rockingham, Surry and Stokes counties as well as parts of Guilford, Alamance, Durham, Granville and Orange counties. The incumbent was Republican Howard Coble, who had represented the district since 1985. He was re-elected with 61% of the vote in 2012, and the district has a PVI of R+10.

=== Republican primary ===
Citing his health, Coble announced on November 7, 2013, that he would retire and not seek another term in 2014.

==== Candidates ====
===== Nominee =====
- Mark Walker, pastor

===== Eliminated in primary =====
- Phil Berger Jr., Rockingham County District Attorney
- Mike Causey, former insurance agent and nominee for North Carolina Commissioner of Insurance in 2012
- Kenn Kopf, attorney
- Zack Matheny, businessman and Greensboro City Councilman
- Jeff Phillips, financial adviser, Guilford County Commissioner and candidate for this seat in 2010
- Charlie Sutherland, retired businessman and candidate for District 13 in 2006
- Bruce VonCannon, retired banker
- Don Webb, financial adviser and Piedmont Triad International Airport Authority member

===== Declined =====
- Howard Coble, incumbent U.S. Representative

==== Polling ====
Poll source	Date(s) administered	Sample size	Margin of error	Phil Berger	Mike Causey	Kenn Kopf	Zack Matheny	Jeff Phillips	Charlie Sutherland	Bruce VonCannon	Mark Walker	Don Webb	Undecided
Public Opinion Strategies (R-Berger)	April 8–10, 2014	300	±5.66%	36%	—	—	6%	—	—	6%	14%	—	38%
Tel Opinion Research	April 2014	–	–	29%	1%	0%	2%	4%	0%	4%	4%	2%	54%

==== Endorsements ====
Phil Berger Jr.

U.S. Representatives

- Howard Coble, U.S. representative from North Carolina's 6th congressional district (1985–present)
- Virginia Foxx, U.S. representative from North Carolina's 5th congressional district (2005–present)
- Patrick McHenry, U.S. representative from North Carolina's 10th congressional district (2005–present)
- Mark Meadows, U.S. representative from North Carolina's 11th congressional district (2013–present)

State legislators

- Mike Hager, state representative (2011–present)
- Jason Saine, state representative (2011–present)
- Sarah Stevens, state representative (2009–present)

Organizations

- Tea Party Express
Mark Walker

State legislators

- John Blust, state representative (2001–present)

Organizations

- Eagle Forum

==== Results ====
Republican primary results
Party	Candidate	Votes	%
Republican	Phil Berger, Jr.	15,127	34.3
Republican	Mark Walker	11,123	25.2
Republican	Bruce VonCannon	5,055	11.4
Republican	Zack Matheny	5,043	11.4
Republican	Jeff Phillips	3,494	7.9
Republican	Don Webb	1,899	4.3
Republican	Mike Causey	1,427	3.2
Republican	Kenn Kopf	510	1.2
Republican	Charlie Sutherland	458	1.0
Total votes		44,136	100.0

==== Runoff ====
Because Berger did not win more than 40 percent of the vote, he and Walker advanced to a runoff, which Walker won.

Republican primary runoff results
Party	Candidate	Votes	%
Republican	Mark Walker	18,965	59.9
Republican	Phil Berger, Jr.	12,722	40.1
Total votes		31,687	100.0

=== Democratic primary ===
==== Candidates ====
===== Nominee =====
- Laura Fjeld, attorney and former vice president of the University of North Carolina system

===== Eliminated in primary =====
- Bruce Davis, Guilford County Commissioner and candidate for the state senate in 2008, 2010 and 2012

==== Results ====
Democratic primary results
Party	Candidate	Votes	%
Democratic	Laura Fjeld	19,066	56.2
Democratic	Bruce Davis	14,882	43.8
Total votes		33,948	100.0

=== General election ===
==== Endorsements ====
Mark Walker (R)

State legislators

- John Blust, state representative (2001–present)

Organizations

- Eagle Forum
- NRA Political Victory Fund
- National Right to Life Committee
Laura Fjeld (D)

Labor unions

- AFL-CIO
- International Brotherhood of Boilermakers
- North Carolina Association of Educators

Organizations

- EMILY's List
- Equality North Carolina

Newspapers

- Indy Week
- The News & Observer

==== Polling ====
Poll source	Date(s) administered	Sample size	Margin of error	Mark Walker (R)	Laura Fjeld (D)	Undecided
New York Times/CBS News Battleground Tracker	October 16–23, 2014	180	± 10%	60%	38%	2%
WPA Opinion Research (R-Walker)	September 3–4, 2014	306	± 5.7%	54%	31%	15%

==== Predictions ====
Source	Ranking	As of
The Cook Political Report	Safe R	November 3, 2014
Rothenberg	Safe R	October 24, 2014
Sabato's Crystal Ball	Safe R	October 30, 2014
RCP	Safe R	November 2, 2014
Daily Kos Elections	Safe R	November 4, 2014

==== Results ====
North Carolina's 6th congressional district, 2014
Party	Candidate	Votes	%
Republican	Mark Walker	147,312	58.7
Democratic	Laura Fjeld	103,758	41.3
Total votes		251,070	100.0
Republican hold			

== District 7 ==
2014 North Carolina's 7th congressional district election
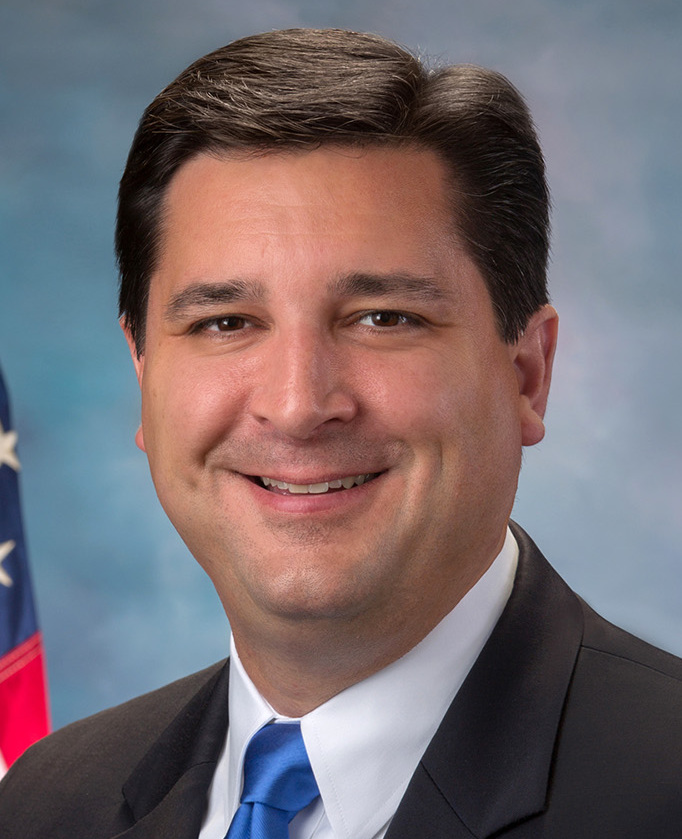

Nominee	David Rouzer	Jonathan Barfield, Jr.
Party	Republican	Democratic
Popular vote	134,431	84,054
Percentage	59.3%	37.1%
- County results Rouzer: 50–60% 60–70% Jonathan barfield: 40–50% 60–70%
U.S. Representative before election
Mike McIntyre
Democratic
Elected U.S. Representative
David Rouzer
Republican

The 7th district is located in southeastern North Carolina and includes Robeson, Cumberland, Sampson, Bladen, Columbus, Brunswick, New Hanover, Pender and Duplin counties. The incumbent was Democrat Mike McIntyre, who had represented the district since 1997. He was re-elected with 50% of the vote in 2012, and the district has a PVI of R+12.

=== Democratic primary ===
==== Candidates ====
===== Nominee =====
- Jonathan Barfield, Jr., New Hanover County Commissioner

===== Eliminated in primary =====
- Walter A. Martin, Jr., Princeton Town Commissioner

===== Declined =====
- Mike McIntyre, incumbent U.S. Representative

==== Results ====
Democratic primary results
Party	Candidate	Votes	%
Democratic	Jonathan Barfield, Jr.	21,966	58.2
Democratic	Walter A. Martin, Jr.	15,741	41.8
Total votes		37,707	100.0

=== Republican primary ===
==== Candidates ====
===== Nominee =====
- David Rouzer, former state senator from the 12th district and nominee for this district in 2012

===== Eliminated in primary =====
- Chris Andrade
- Haywood "Woody" White, New Hanover County Commissioner and former state senator

==== Results ====
Republican primary results
Party	Candidate	Votes	%
Republican	David Rouzer	23,010	53.0
Republican	Haywood "Woody" White	17,389	40.1
Republican	Chris Andrade	3,000	6.9
Total votes		43,399	100.0

=== Minor parties ===
Attorney J. Wesley Casteen, who ran for a seat on the North Carolina Court of Appeals in 2010, was the Libertarian Party nominee. Louis Harmati, who ran for the state legislature as a Republican in 2012, ran as a write-in candidate.

=== General election ===
==== Endorsements ====
Jonathan Barfield (D)

Labor unions

- AFL-CIO
- International Brotherhood of Boilermakers
- North Carolina Association of Educators

Newspapers

- The News & Observer
David Rouzer (R)

State officials

- Mike Huckabee, former Governor of Arkansas (1996–2007) and candidate for President in 2008

Organizations

- National Federation of Independent Business
- NRA Political Victory Fund
- National Right to Life Committee
- Tea Party Express
- United States Chamber of Commerce

==== Polling ====
Poll source	Date(s) administered	Sample size	Margin of error	Jonathan Barfield, Jr. (D)	David Rouzer (R)	J. Wesley Casteen (L)	Undecided
New York Times/CBS News Battleground Tracker	October 16–23, 2014	324	± 9%	32%	54%	—	13%

==== Predictions ====
Source	Ranking	As of
The Cook Political Report	Likely R (flip)	November 3, 2014
Rothenberg	Safe R (flip)	October 24, 2014
Sabato's Crystal Ball	Safe R (flip)	October 30, 2014
RCP	Safe R (flip)	November 2, 2014
Daily Kos Elections	Safe R (flip)	November 4, 2014

==== Results ====
North Carolina's 7th congressional district, 2014
Party	Candidate	Votes	%
Republican	David Rouzer	134,431	59.3
Democratic	Jonathan Barfield, Jr.	84,054	37.1
Libertarian	J. Wesley Casteen	7,850	3.5
Write-in		169	0.1
Total votes		226,504	100.0
Republican gain from Democratic			

== District 8 ==
2014 North Carolina's 8th congressional district election
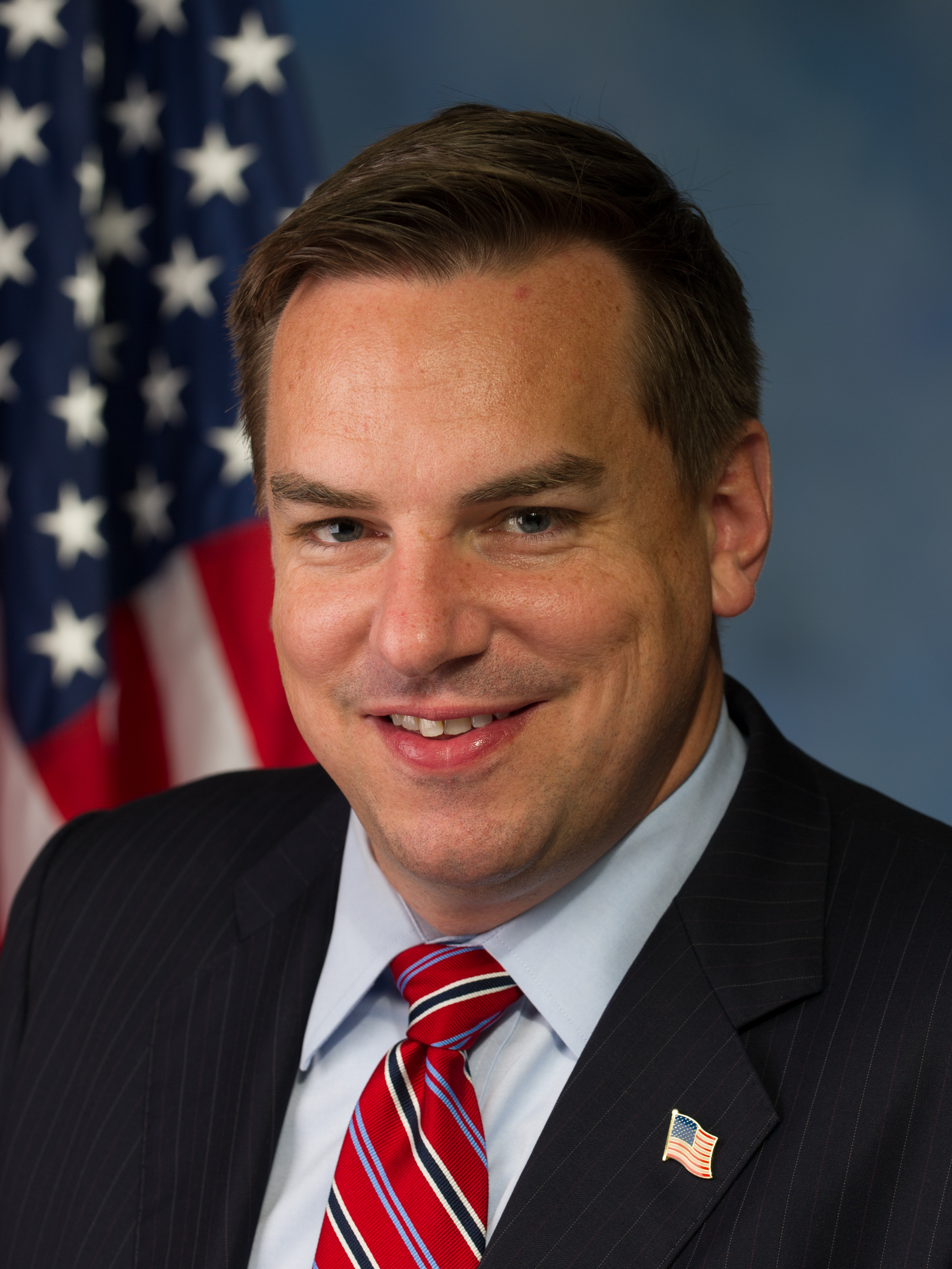

Nominee	Richard Hudson	Antonio Blue
Party	Republican	Democratic
Popular vote	121,568	65,854
Percentage	64.9%	35.1%
- County results Hudson: 50–60% 60–70% 70–80% 80–90% Blue: 50–60% 60–70%
U.S. Representative before election
Richard Hudson
Republican
Elected U.S. Representative
Richard Hudson
Republican

The 8th district is located in Southern North Carolina and includes all of Anson County, Montgomery County, Richmond County, Scotland County and Stanly County, as well as portions of Cabarrus County, Davidson County, Mecklenburg County, Randolph County, Robeson County, Rowan County and Union County. The incumbent was Republican Richard Hudson, who had represented the district since 2013. He was elected in 2012, defeating Democratic incumbent Larry Kissell with 53% of the vote. The district has a PVI of R+11.

=== Republican primary ===
==== Candidates ====
===== Nominee =====
- Richard Hudson, incumbent U.S. Representative

=== Democratic primary ===
==== Candidates ====
===== Nominee =====
- Antonio Blue, Mayor of Dobbins Heights, U.S. Army veteran and write-in candidate for this district in 2012

=== General election ===
==== Endorsements ====
Richard Hudson (R)

Organizations

- National Federation of Independent Business
- NRA Political Victory Fund
- National Right to Life Committee

==== Polling ====
Poll source	Date(s) administered	Sample size	Margin of error	Richard Hudson (R)	Antonio Blue (D)	Undecided
New York Times/CBS News Battleground Tracker	October 16–23, 2014	90	± 16%	57%	33%	9%

==== Predictions ====
Source	Ranking	As of
The Cook Political Report	Safe R	November 3, 2014
Rothenberg	Safe R	October 24, 2014
Sabato's Crystal Ball	Safe R	October 30, 2014
RCP	Safe R	November 2, 2014
Daily Kos Elections	Safe R	November 4, 2014

==== Results ====
North Carolina's 8th congressional district, 2014
Party	Candidate	Votes	%
Republican	Richard Hudson (incumbent)	121,568	64.9
Democratic	Antonio Blue	65,854	35.1
Total votes		187,422	100.0
Republican hold			

== District 9 ==
2014 North Carolina's 9th congressional district election
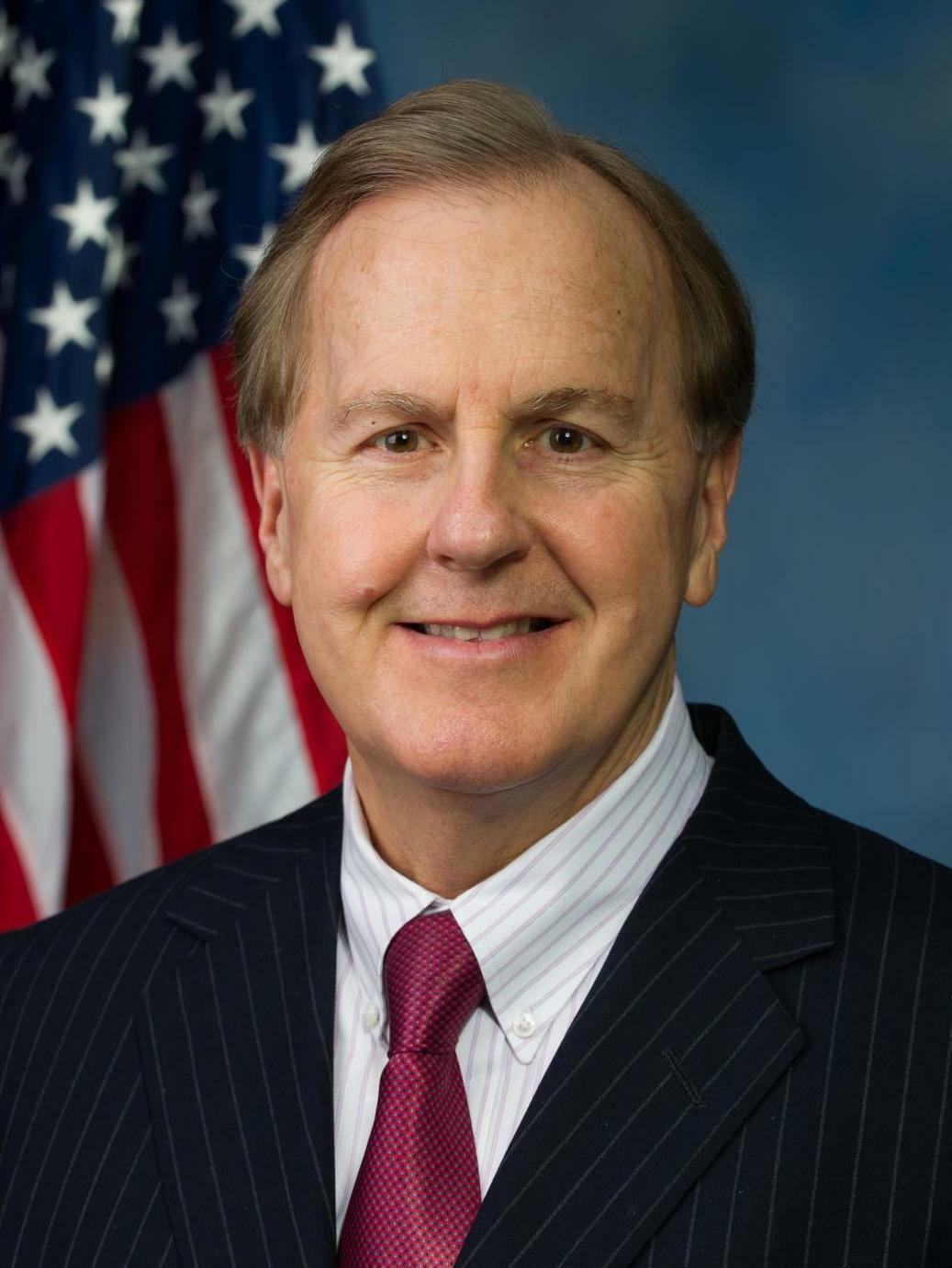
Candidate	Robert Pittenger
Party	Republican
Popular vote	163,080
Percentage	93.9%
U.S. Representative before election
Robert Pittenger
Republican
Elected U.S. Representative
Robert Pittenger
Republican

The 9th district is located in south-central North Carolina and includes parts of Iredell, Mecklenburg and Union counties. The incumbent was Republican Robert Pittenger, who had represented the district since 2013. He was elected with 52% of the vote in 2012, succeeding retiring Republican incumbent Sue Myrick. The district has a PVI of R+8.

Pittenger had considered running for the U.S. Senate but instead ran for re-election.

=== Republican primary ===
==== Candidates ====
===== Nominee =====
- Robert Pittenger, incumbent U.S. Representative

==== Eliminated in primary ====
- Michael Steinberg, businessman and candidate for this seat in 2012.

==== Results ====
Republican primary results
Party	Candidate	Votes	%
Republican	Robert Pittenger (incumbent)	29,505	67.6
Republican	Michael Steinberg	14,146	32.4
Total votes		43,651	100.0

=== Democratic primary ===
No Democrat filed to run for the seat, making this district the only one in the state not being contested by both major parties in 2014.

=== Independents ===
There was a write-in campaign for candidate Shawn Eckles of Iredell County.

=== General election ===
==== Endorsements ====
Robert Pittenger (R)

Organizations

- National Federation of Independent Business
- National Right to Life Committee
- NRA Political Victory Fund

==== Predictions ====
Source	Ranking	As of
The Cook Political Report	Safe R	November 3, 2014
Rothenberg	Safe R	October 24, 2014
Sabato's Crystal Ball	Safe R	October 30, 2014
RCP	Safe R	November 2, 2014
Daily Kos Elections	Safe R	November 4, 2014

==== Results ====
North Carolina's 9th congressional district, 2014
Party	Candidate	Votes	%
Republican	Robert Pittenger (incumbent)	163,080	93.9
Write-in		8,219	4.7
Independent	Shawn Eckles (write-in)	2,369	1.4
Total votes		173,668	100.0
Republican hold			

== District 10 ==
2014 North Carolina's 10th congressional district election
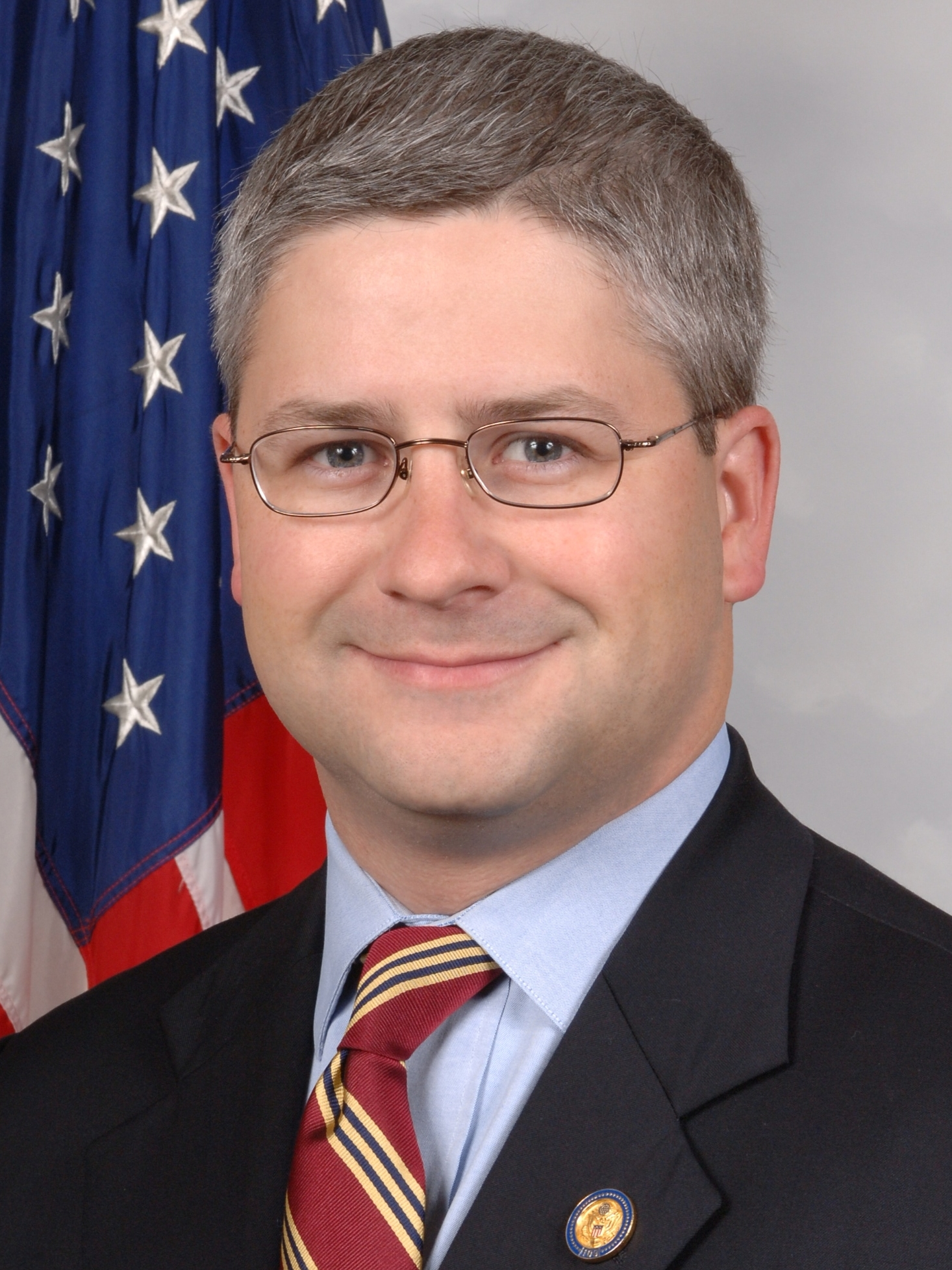

Nominee	Patrick McHenry	Tate MacQueen
Party	Republican	Democratic
Popular vote	133,504	85,292
Percentage	61.0%	39.0%
- County results Mchenry: 50–60% 60–70% 70–80% Macqueen: 60–70%
U.S. Representative before election
Patrick McHenry
Republican
Elected U.S. Representative
Patrick McHenry
Republican

The 10th district is located in central and western North Carolina and includes all of Cleveland, Gaston, Lincoln and Rutherford counties and parts of Catawba, Iredell and Buncombe counties. The incumbent was Republican Patrick McHenry, who had represented the district since 2005. He was re-elected with 57% of the vote in 2012, and the district has a PVI of R+11.

McHenry had considered running for the U.S. Senate but instead ran for re-election.

=== Republican primary ===
==== Candidates ====
===== Nominee =====
- Patrick McHenry, incumbent U.S. Representative

===== Eliminated in primary =====
- Richard Lynch, business owner and candidate for North Carolina's 9th congressional district in 2012

==== Results ====
Republican primary results
Party	Candidate	Votes	%
Republican	Patrick McHenry (incumbent)	29,400	78.0
Republican	Richard Lynch	8,273	22.0
Total votes		37,673	100.0

=== Democratic primary ===
==== Candidates ====
===== Nominee =====
- Tate MacQueen, High school social studies teacher and soccer coach

===== Declined =====
- Terry Bellamy, Mayor of Asheville and candidate for this seat in 2012

=== General election ===
==== Endorsements ====
Patrick McHenry (R)

Organizations

- National Federation of Independent Business
- National Right to Life Committee
- NRA Political Victory Fund
Tate MacQueen (D)

Labor unions

- AFL-CIO
- North Carolina Association of Educators

Organizations

- Equality North Carolina
- Progressive Democrats of America

==== Polling ====
Poll source	Date(s) administered	Sample size	Margin of error	Patrick McHenry (R)	Tate MacQueen (D)	Undecided
New York Times/CBS News Battleground Tracker	October 16–23, 2014	128	± 21%	51%	29%	20%

==== Predictions ====
Source	Ranking	As of
The Cook Political Report	Safe R	November 3, 2014
Rothenberg	Safe R	October 24, 2014
Sabato's Crystal Ball	Safe R	October 30, 2014
RCP	Safe R	November 2, 2014
Daily Kos Elections	Safe R	November 4, 2014

==== Results ====
North Carolina's 10th congressional district, 2014
Party	Candidate	Votes	%
Republican	Patrick McHenry (incumbent)	133,504	61.0
Democratic	Tate MacQueen	85,292	39.0
Total votes		218,796	100.0
Republican hold			

== District 11 ==
2014 North Carolina's 11th congressional district election
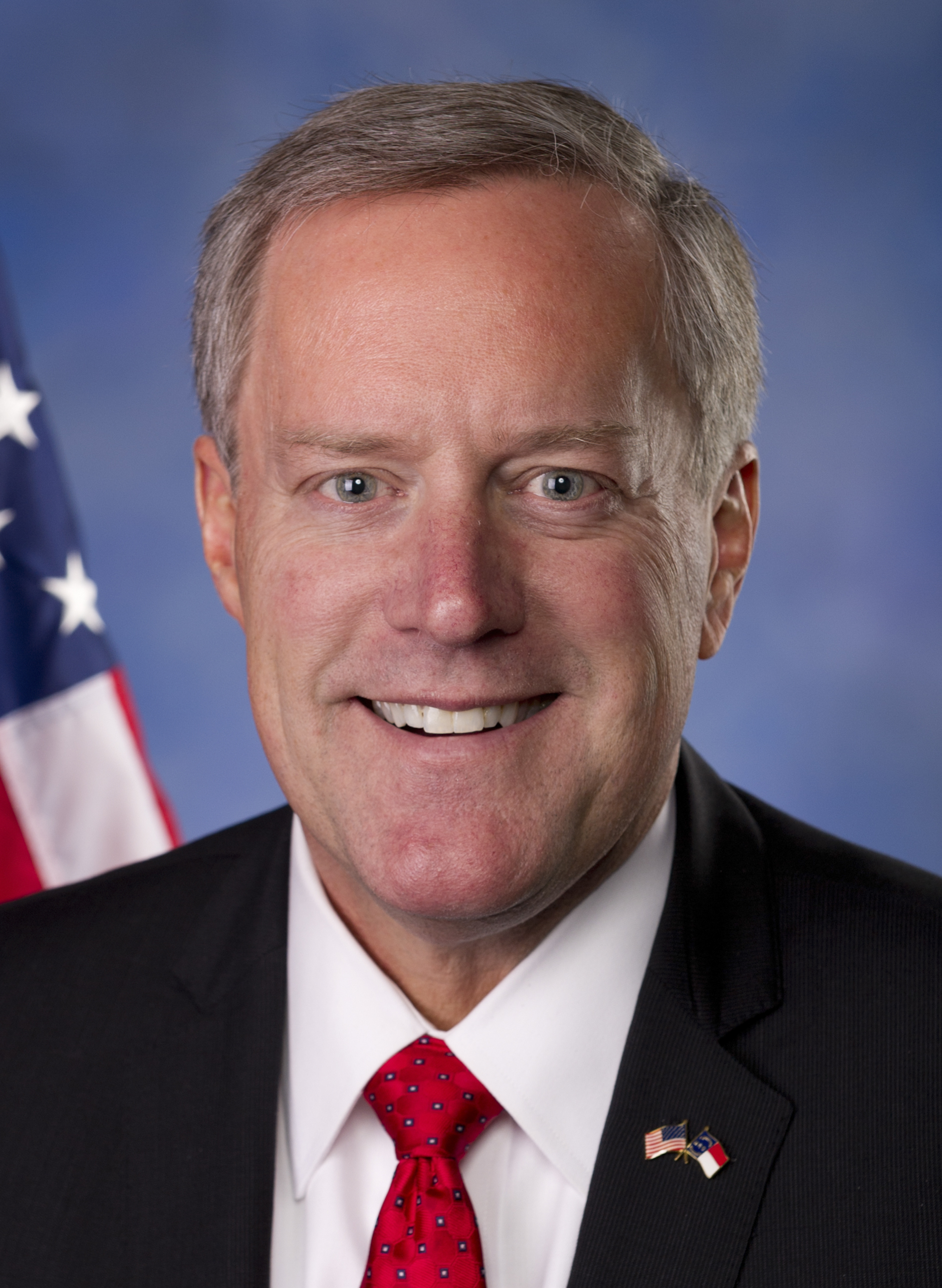

Nominee	Mark Meadows	Tom Hill
Party	Republican	Democratic
Popular vote	144,682	85,342
Percentage	62.9%	37.1%
- County results Meadows: 50–60% 60–70% 70–80%
U.S. Representative before election
Mark Meadows
Republican
Elected U.S. Representative
Mark Meadows
Republican

The 11th district is located in western North Carolina and includes Yancey, McDowell, Rutherford, Polk, Henderson, Buncombe, Madison, Haywood, Jackson, Transylvania, Swain, Macon, Clay, Graham and Cherokee counties. The incumbent was Republican Mark Meadows, who had represented the district since 2013. He was elected with 57% of the vote in 2012, succeeding retiring Democratic incumbent Heath Shuler. The district has a PVI of R+13.

=== Republican primary ===
==== Candidates ====
===== Nominee =====
- Mark Meadows, incumbent U.S. Representative

=== Democratic primary ===
==== Candidates ====
===== Nominee =====
- Tom Hill, physicist and candidate for this seat in 2012

===== Eliminated in primary =====
- Keith Ruehl, businessman and volunteer firefighter

==== Results ====
Democratic primary results
Party	Candidate	Votes	%
Democratic	Tom Hill	16,819	54.1
Democratic	Keith Ruehl	14,272	45.9
Total votes		31,091	100.0

=== General election ===
==== Endorsements ====
Mark Meadows (R)

Organizations

- Eagle Forum
- National Federation of Independent Business
- National Right to Life Committee
- NRA Political Victory Fund
Tom Hill (D)

Labor unions

- AFL-CIO

==== Polling ====
Poll source	Date(s) administered	Sample size	Margin of error	Mark Meadows (R)	Tom Hill (D)	Undecided
New York Times/CBS News Battleground Tracker	October 16–23, 2014	141	± 14%	59%	34%	8%

==== Predictions ====
Source	Ranking	As of
The Cook Political Report	Safe R	November 3, 2014
Rothenberg	Safe R	October 24, 2014
Sabato's Crystal Ball	Safe R	October 30, 2014
RCP	Safe R	November 2, 2014
Daily Kos Elections	Safe R	November 4, 2014

==== Results ====
North Carolina's 11th congressional district, 2014
Party	Candidate	Votes	%
Republican	Mark Meadows (incumbent)	144,682	62.9
Democratic	Tom Hill	85,342	37.1
Total votes		230,024	100.0
Republican hold			

== District 12 ==
2014 North Carolina's 12th congressional district election
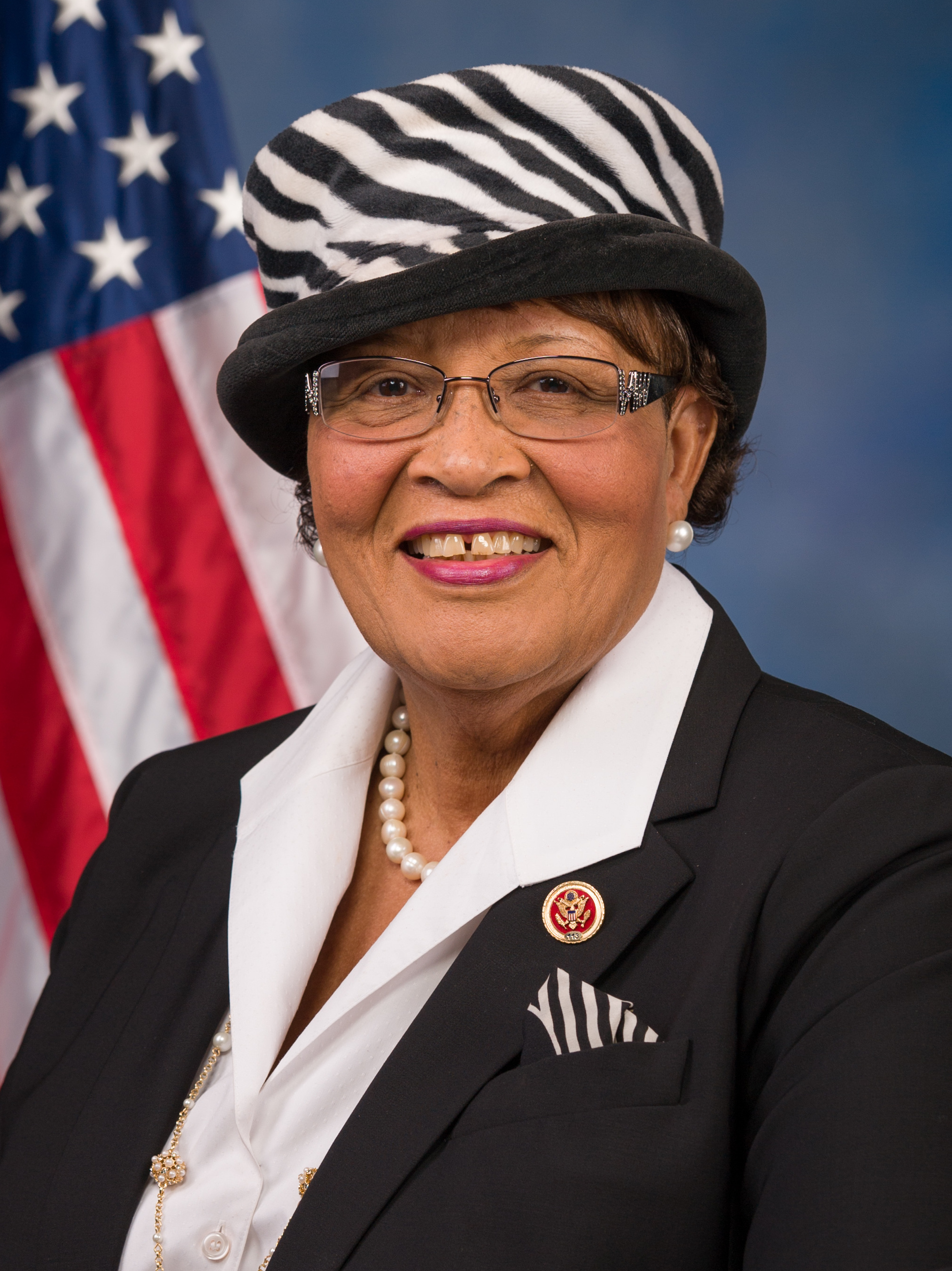

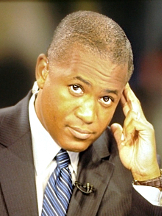
Nominee	Alma Adams	Vince Coakley
Party	Democratic	Republican
Popular vote	130,096	42,568
Percentage	75.4%	24.6%
U.S. Representative before election
Alma Adams
Democratic
Elected U.S. Representative
Alma Adams
Democratic

The 12th district is located in central North Carolina and includes parts of Charlotte, Winston-Salem, Greensboro, Lexington, Salisbury, Concord, and High Point. Democrat Mel Watt held this seat from 1993 until he resigned on January 6, 2014, to become director of the Federal Housing Finance Agency. The special election to fill the seat for the remainder of the current Congress would be held concurrently with the regular 2014 elections. Watt was re-elected with 80% of the vote in 2012 and the district has a PVI of D+26.

=== Democratic primary ===
==== Candidates ====
===== Nominee =====
- Alma Adams, state representative

===== Eliminated in primary =====
- George Battle III, general counsel to the Charlotte-Mecklenburg school board
- Marcus Brandon, state representative
- Malcolm Graham, state senator
- Curtis C. Osborne, attorney
- Rajive Patel, former mayor of East Spencer

All except Patel also ran in the special election.

===== Withdrew =====
- Brad Craver, management consultant
- Beverly M. Earle, state representative and nominee for Mayor of Charlotte in 2007
- James "Smuggie" Mitchell, Jr., former Charlotte City Council member and candidate for Mayor of Charlotte in 2013
- Rodney W. Moore, state representative

==== Polling ====
Poll source	Date(s) administered	Sample size	Margin of error	Alma Adams	George Battle	Marcus Brandon	Malcolm Graham	James Mitchell	Curtis Osborne	Rajive Patel	Undecided
Hamilton Campaigns (D-Adams)	Feb. 28–Mar. 4, 2014	500	± 4.4%	26%	9%	4%	19%	9%	3%	1%	29%

==== Results ====
Democratic primary results
Party	Candidate	Votes	%
Democratic	Alma Adams	15,235	44.0
Democratic	Malcolm Graham	8,180	23.6
Democratic	George Battle III	4,342	12.5
Democratic	Marcus Brandon	2,856	8.3
Democratic	James "Smuggie" Mitchell, Jr.	1,775	5.1
Democratic	Curtis C. Osborne	1,733	5.0
Democratic	Rajive Patel	502	1.4
Total votes		34,623	100.0

=== Republican primary ===
==== Candidates ====
===== Nominee =====
- Vince Coakley, former TV news anchor

===== Eliminated in primary =====
- Leon Threatt

Coakley was the only Republican to file for the special election.

==== Results ====
Republican primary results
Party	Candidate	Votes	%
Republican	Vince Coakley	8,652	78.0
Republican	Leon Threatt	2,439	22.0
Total votes		11,091	100.0

=== General election ===
==== Endorsements ====
Alma Adams (D)

Labor unions

- AFL-CIO
- International Brotherhood of Boilermakers
- National Association of Letter Carriers
- North Carolina Association of Educators

Organizations

- Equality North Carolina
- Human Rights Campaign
- League of Conservation Voters
- National Organization for Women
- Sierra Club
Vince Coakley (R)

Organizations

- Eagle Forum
- National Right to Life Committee

==== Polling ====
Poll source	Date(s) administered	Sample size	Margin of error	Alma Adams (D)	Vince Coakley (R)	Undecided
New York Times/CBS News Battleground Tracker	October 16–23, 2014	91	± 15%	70%	19%	11%

==== Predictions ====
Source	Ranking	As of
The Cook Political Report	Safe D	November 3, 2014
Rothenberg	Safe D	October 24, 2014
Sabato's Crystal Ball	Safe D	October 30, 2014
RCP	Safe D	November 2, 2014
Daily Kos Elections	Safe D	November 4, 2014

==== Results ====
North Carolina's 12th congressional district, 2014
Party	Candidate	Votes	%
Democratic	Alma Adams	130,096	75.4
Republican	Vince Coakley	42,568	24.6
Total votes		172,664	100.0
Democratic hold			

== District 13 ==
2014 North Carolina's 13th congressional district election
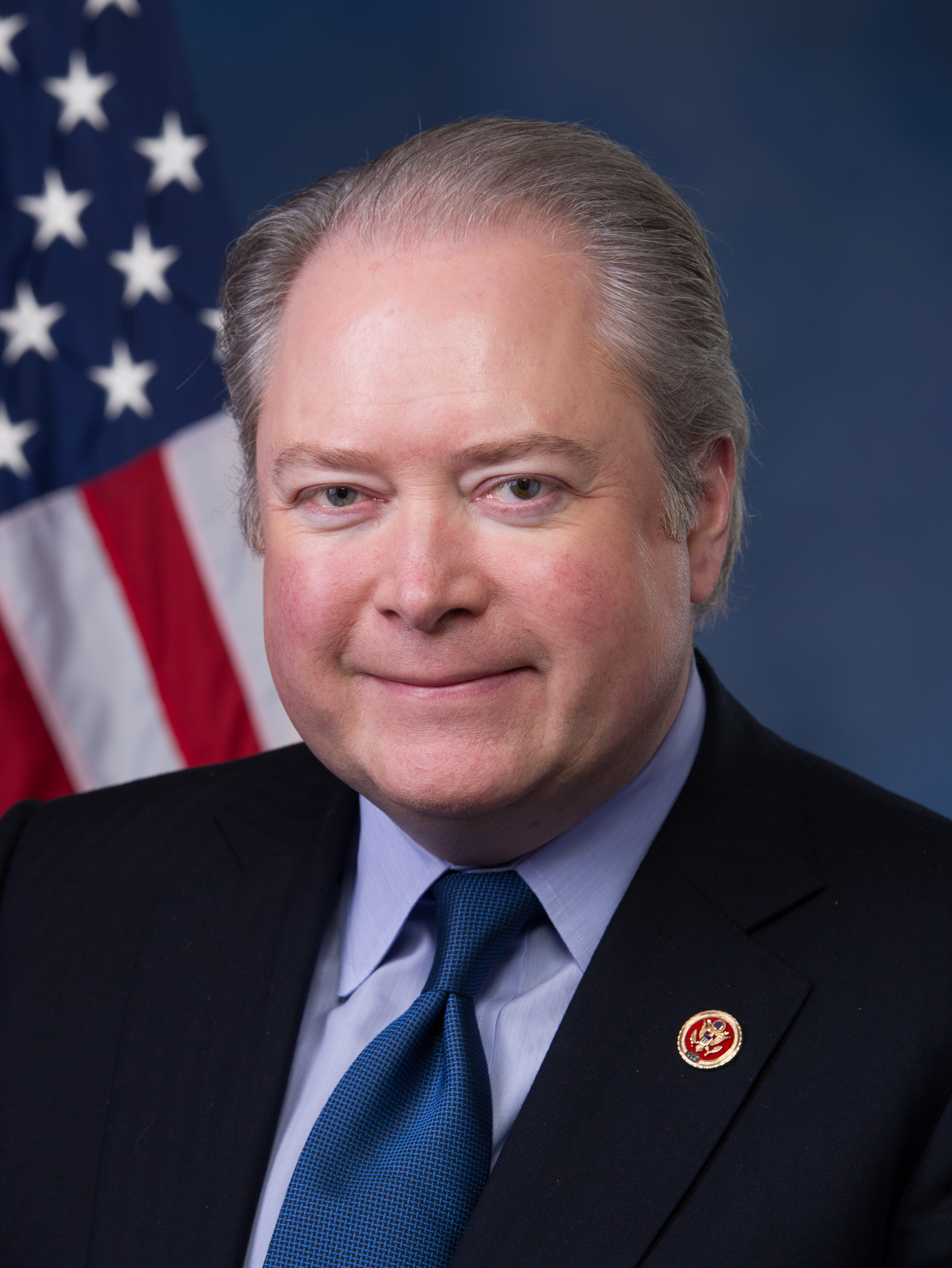

Nominee	George Holding	Brenda Cleary
Party	Republican	Democratic
Popular vote	153,991	114,718
Percentage	57.3%	42.7%
- County results Holding: 50–60% 60–70% 70–80% Cleary: 50–60%
U.S. Representative before election
George Holding
Republican
Elected U.S. Representative
George Holding
Republican

The 13th district is located in northern North Carolina and includes parts of Granville, Wake, Durham, Edgecombe, Franklin, Nash, Vance, Wayne and Wilson counties. The incumbent was Republican George Holding, who had represented the district since 2013. He was elected with 57% of the vote in 2012, succeeding retiring Democratic incumbent Brad Miller. The district has a PVI of R+8.

Holding had considered running for the U.S. Senate but instead ran for re-election.

=== Republican primary ===
==== Candidates ====
===== Nominee =====
- George Holding, incumbent U.S. Representative

=== Democratic primary ===
==== Candidates ====
===== Nominee =====
- Brenda Cleary, registered nurse and former executive director of the North Carolina Center for Nursing

===== Eliminated in primary =====
- Virginia Conlon
- Arunava "Ron" Sanyal

==== Results ====
Democratic primary results
Party	Candidate	Votes	%
Democratic	Brenda Cleary	24,631	70.4
Democratic	Virginia Conlon	6,308	18.0
Democratic	Arunava "Ron" Sanyal	4,052	11.6
Total votes		34,991	100.0

=== General election ===
==== Endorsements ====
George Holding (R)

Organizations

- National Federation of Independent Business
- National Right to Life Committee
- NRA Political Victory Fund
Brenda Cleary (D)

Labor unions

- International Brotherhood of Boilermakers

Organizations

- Equality North Carolina

Newspapers

- Indy Week
- The News & Observer

==== Polling ====
Poll source	Date(s) administered	Sample size	Margin of error	George Holding (R)	Brenda Cleary (D)	Undecided
New York Times/CBS News Battleground Tracker	October 16–23, 2014	168	± 13%	62%	31%	7%

==== Predictions ====
Source	Ranking	As of
The Cook Political Report	Safe R	November 3, 2014
Rothenberg	Safe R	October 24, 2014
Sabato's Crystal Ball	Safe R	October 30, 2014
RCP	Safe R	November 2, 2014
Daily Kos Elections	Safe R	November 4, 2014

==== Results ====
North Carolina's 13th congressional district, 2014
Party	Candidate	Votes	%
Republican	George Holding (incumbent)	153,991	57.3
Democratic	Brenda Cleary	114,718	42.7
Total votes		268,709	100.0
Republican hold			

== See also ==
- 2014 United States House of Representatives elections
- 2014 United States elections
