= 2014 North Carolina's 12th congressional district special election =

- November 4, 2014

North Carolina's 12th congressional district
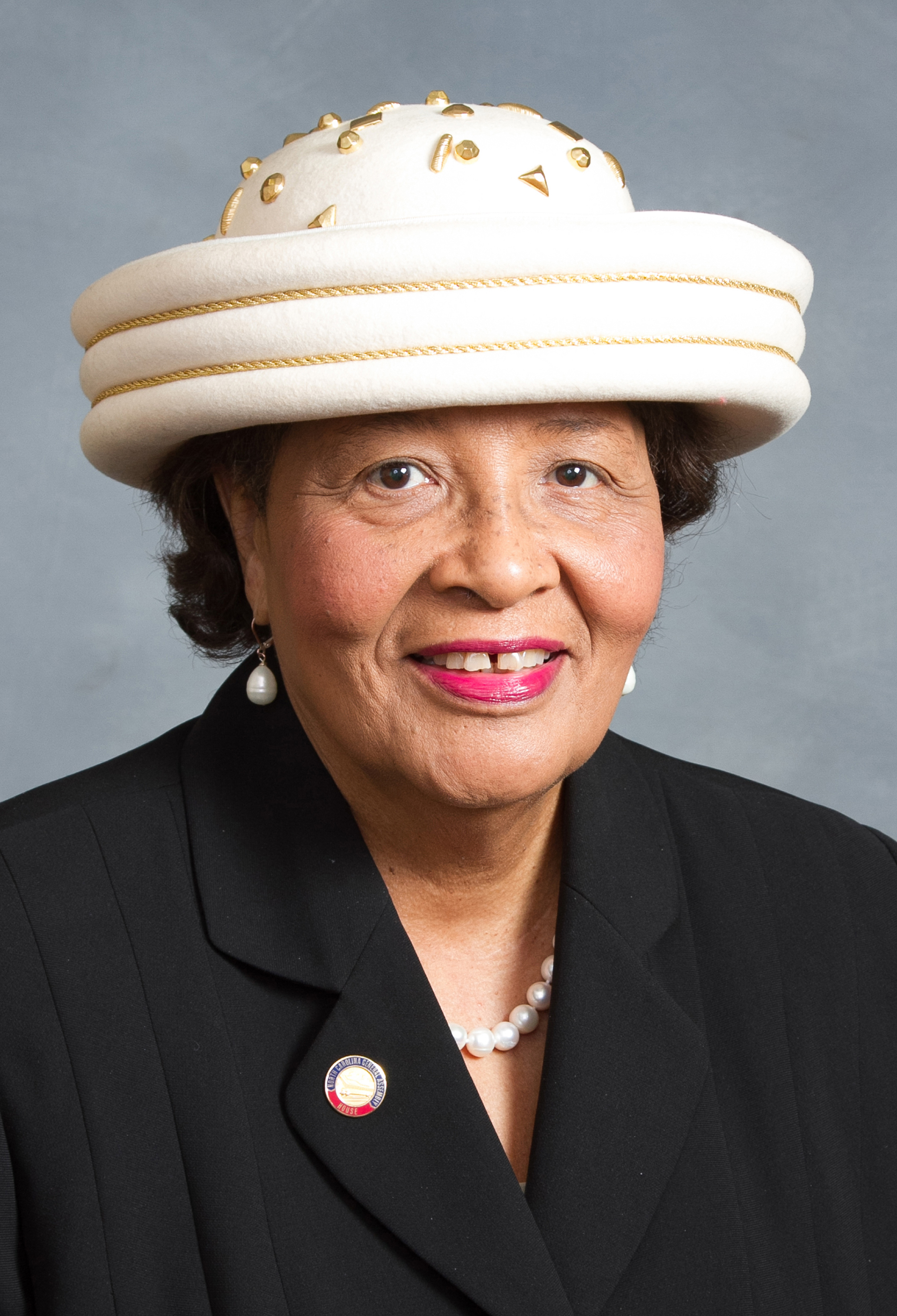

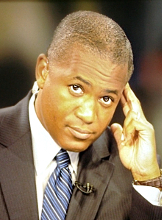
Nominee	Alma Adams	Vince Coakley
Party	Democratic	Republican
Popular vote	127,668	41,578
Percentage	75.4%	24.6%
- County results
U.S. Representative before election
Mel Watt
Democratic
Elected U.S. Representative
Alma Adams
Democratic

A special election for the United States House of Representatives in North Carolina's 12th congressional district was held on November 4, 2014, to fill the vacancy caused by the resignation of U.S. Rep. Mel Watt following his appointment to head the Federal Housing Administration.

North Carolina Governor Pat McCrory chose to hold the election concurrently with the regular 2014 general elections, rather than hold a separate special election at an earlier date to fill the vacancy. Party primary elections for the seat would be held May 6. Primary runoffs, if needed, were scheduled for July 15 but proved unnecessary, because the only primary winner won more than 40 percent of the vote. According to politician Gerry Cohen, the primary was the first special primary election in North Carolina history, because in previous special elections, committees or conventions of party leaders selected their nominees.

The winner of the special election would serve through the remaining months of the 113th Congress, while the winner of the regular general election being held the same day would serve in the 114th Congress. This is essentially the same procedure used in North Carolina in 1992 to fill the vacancy in the First Congressional District (other than the addition of a primary election). Because Watt resigned in January and the winner of the special election was not seated until after the November election result is official, the district was without a representative for more than 11 months.

== Background ==
Democratic Congressman Mel Watt was confirmed by the United States Senate on December 10, 2013, to head the Federal Housing Finance Agency. He resigned from Congress on January 6, 2014, the day he took office as director of FHFA.

== Democratic primary ==
=== Candidates ===
==== Declared ====
- Alma Adams, state representative
- George Battle III, general counsel to the Charlotte-Mecklenburg school board
- Marcus Brandon, state representative
- Malcolm Graham, state senator
- Curtis C. Osborne, attorney

==== Withdrew ====
- Brad Craver, management consultant
- Beverly M. Earle, state representative and nominee for Mayor of Charlotte in 2007
- James "Smuggie" Mitchell Jr., former Charlotte City Council member and candidate for Mayor of Charlotte in 2013
- Rodney W. Moore, state representative

=== Polling ===
Poll source	Date(s) administered	Sample size	Margin of error	Alma Adams	George Battle	Marcus Brandon	Malcolm Graham	James Mitchell	Curtis Osborne	Rajive Patel	Undecided
Hamilton (D-Adams)	February 28 – March 4, 2014	500	± 4.4%	26%	9%	4%	19%	9%	3%	1%	29%

=== Results ===
Democratic primary election results
Party	Candidate	Votes	%
Democratic	Alma Adams	14,967	44.2
Democratic	Malcolm Graham	7,495	22.1
Democratic	George Battle III	4,431	13.1
Democratic	Marcus Brandon	2,984	8.8
Democratic	James "Smuggie" Mitchell, Jr.	2,034	6.0
Democratic	Curtis C. Osborne	1,939	5.7
Total votes		33,850	100.0

== Republican primary ==
=== Candidates ===
==== Declared ====
- Vince Coakley, former TV news anchor

=== Endorsements ===
Vince Coakley
- LibertyConservatives.com

== General election ==
=== Results ===
North Carolina's 12th congressional district, 2014 (special)
Party	Candidate	Votes	%	±%
Democratic	Alma Adams	127,668	75.43%	−4.20%
Republican	Vince Coakley	41,578	24.57%	+4.20%
Total votes		169,246	100.00%	N/A
Democratic hold				
