= Alma Adams =

American politician (born 1946)

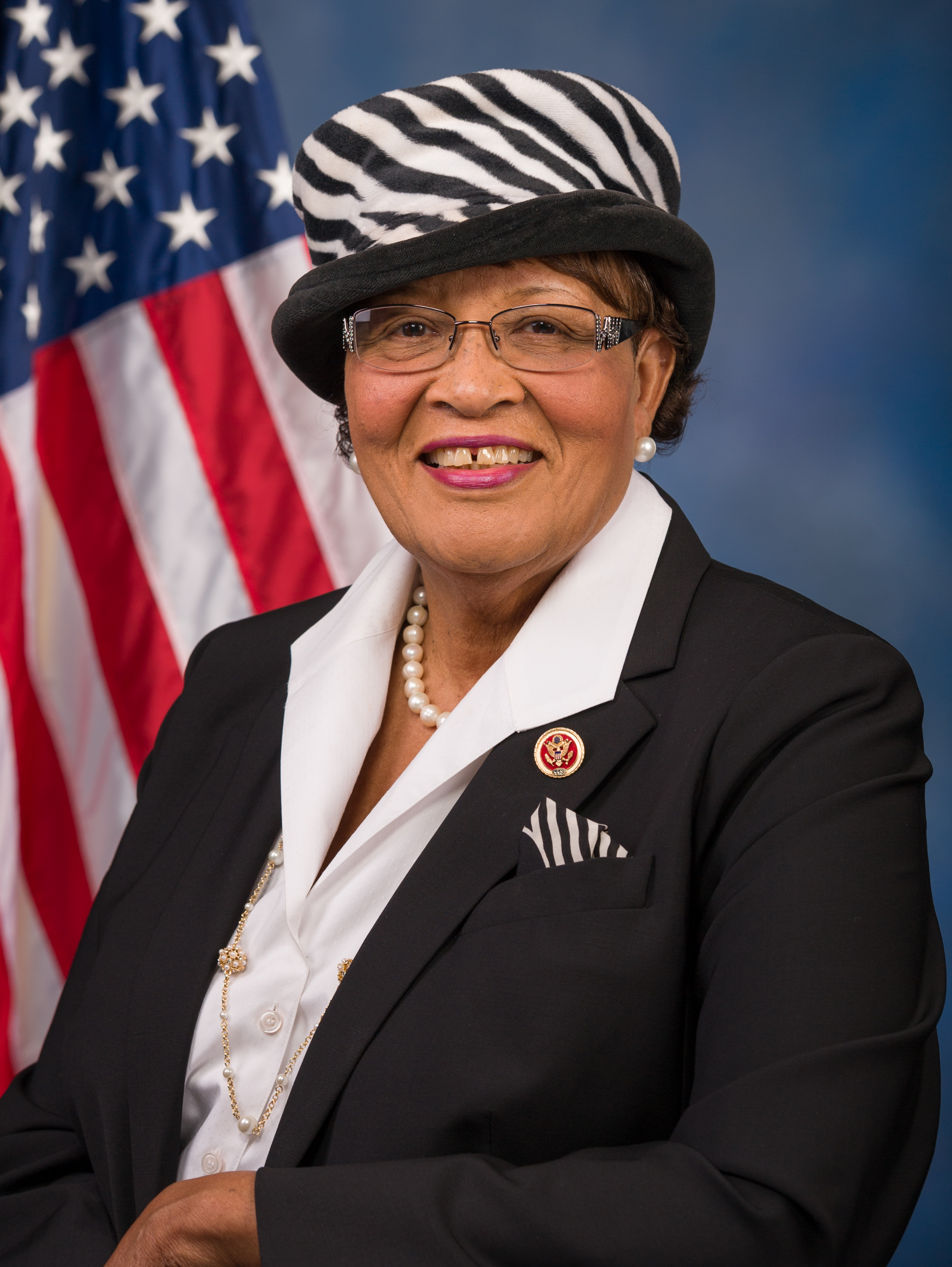
- Official portrait, 2014

Member of the U.S. House of Representatives from North Carolina's 12th district
- Incumbent
- Assumed office November 4, 2014 (Note: Adams's official service begins on the date of the special election, while she was not sworn in until November 12, 2014.)
- Preceded by: Mel Watt

Member of the North Carolina House of Representatives
- In office April 1994 – November 4, 2014
- Preceded by: Herman Gist
- Succeeded by: Ralph Johnson
- Constituency: 26th district (1994–2003); 58th district (2003–2014)

Personal details
- Born: Alma Shealey; May 27, 1946 (age 80) High Point, North Carolina, U.S.
- Party: Democratic
- Children: 2
- Education: North Carolina A&T State University (BS, MS); Ohio State University (PhD)
- Website: House website Campaign website
- Adams's voice Adams supporting the IGNITE HBCU Excellence Act. Recorded June 28, 2021

Alma Shealey Adams (born May 27, 1946) is an American politician who represents North Carolina's 12th congressional district in the United States House of Representatives. A Democrat, Adams represented the state's 58th House district in Guilford County in the North Carolina General Assembly from her appointment in April 1994 until her election to Congress, succeeded by Ralph C. Johnson. Adams will become the dean of North Carolina's congressional delegation beginning in 2027, following the defeats of Virginia Foxx and Richard Hudson.

Adams is a former college administrator and art professor from Greensboro. She is known for her distinctive hats. She won the 2014 special election in North Carolina's 12th congressional district to fill the vacancy created by the resignation of Mel Watt. She won election to a full two-year term at the same time.

== Early life and education ==
Adams was born on May 27, 1946, in High Point, North Carolina, to Benjamin Shealey and Mattie Stokes. She was raised by her mother, who worked as a domestic worker. Adams moved with her family to Baltimore, Maryland, as a child before settling in Newark, New Jersey. She attended the predominantly white West Side High School in Newark and graduated in 1964.

Adams then went to North Carolina A&T State University in Greensboro, North Carolina, where she earned a Bachelor of Science degree in 1969 and a Master of Science degree in 1972, both in art education. While at NC A&T, she served as president of the Arts Circle and became a member of Alpha Kappa Alpha sorority.

== Art career ==
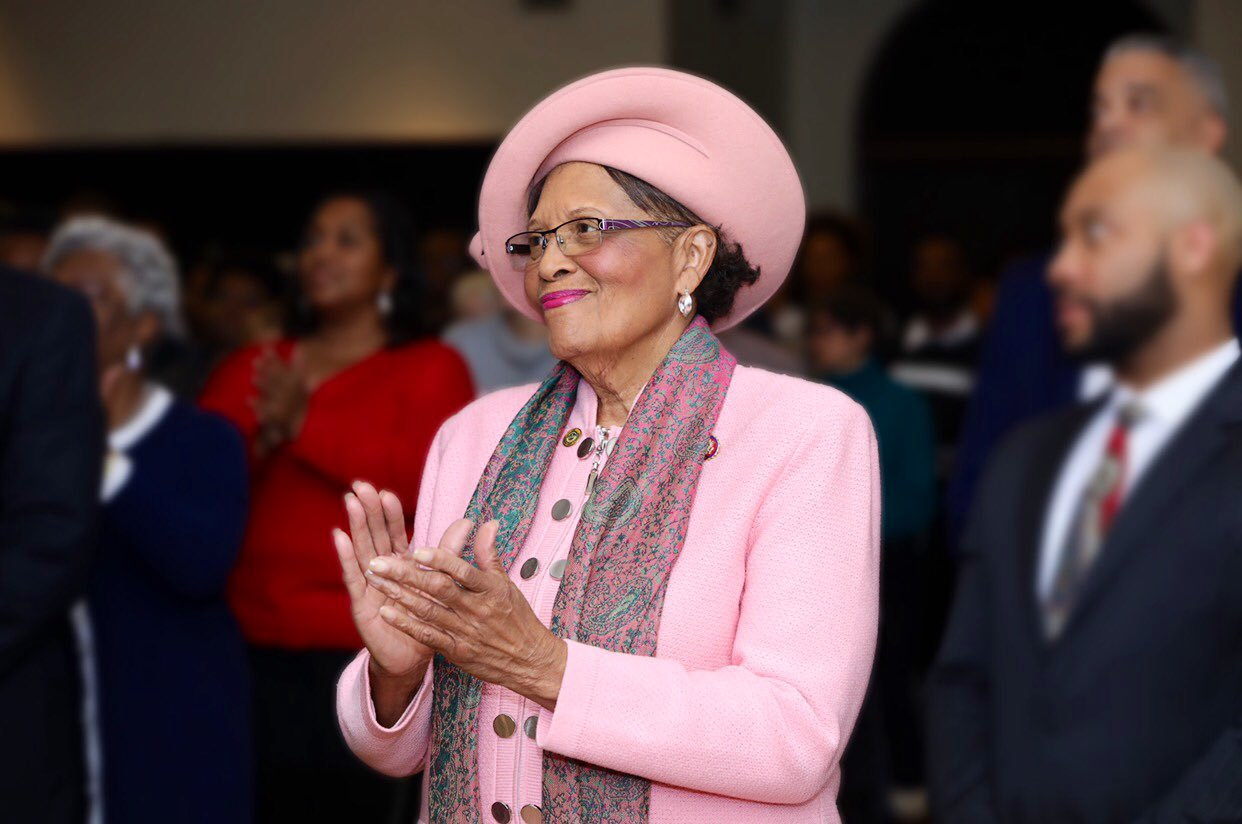
Adams wearing one of her distinctive hats in 2020

After completing her graduate studies, Adams was appointed chair of the art department at the Palmer Institute, where she taught students in grades seven through twelve. She later earned a Ph.D. in art education and multicultural education from Ohio State University in 1981.

Adams later joined the faculty of Bennett College in Greensboro, where she taught until 2012. She was also the director of the Steel Hall Art Gallery. In 1990, Adams and artist Eva Hamlin Miller co-founded the African American Atelier, an organization established to advance awareness and appreciation for visual arts and cultures of African Americans.

== State legislature ==
Adams began her political career as a member of the Greensboro City School Board from 1984 to 1986, before serving on the Greensboro City Council from 1987 until her appointment to the North Carolina House of Representatives in 1994.

She was appointed to the state House to fill the seat of Representative Herman Gist, who had died in office. At the time of her appointment, Adams had already announced her candidacy to challenge Gist in the upcoming Democratic primary in 1994. The house district included most of southeastern Greensboro in Guilford County. In the primary election, she defeated O.C. Stafford, a businessman, retired engineer, and perennial candidate, who had previously run for office as both a Democrat and a Republican. Adams won a full term in the 1994 general election, defeating Republican Roger G. Coffer. She went on to win reelection in 1996 and 1998 against Stafford, who ran as a Republican in both races. In 2000, Adams was unopposed in the Democratic primary and defeated Republican Jim Rumley in the general election.

Following redistricting in 2002, Adams' district was renumbered from the 26th to the 58th. That year, she was challenged by Libertarian candidate David Williams, who withdrew from the race before the election but remained on the ballot. Adams won reelection with nearly 86% of the vote. From 2004 onward, she faced repeated challenges from Republican legal assistant and party activist Olga Morgan Wright, defeating her in every election through 2008, and then again in 2012.

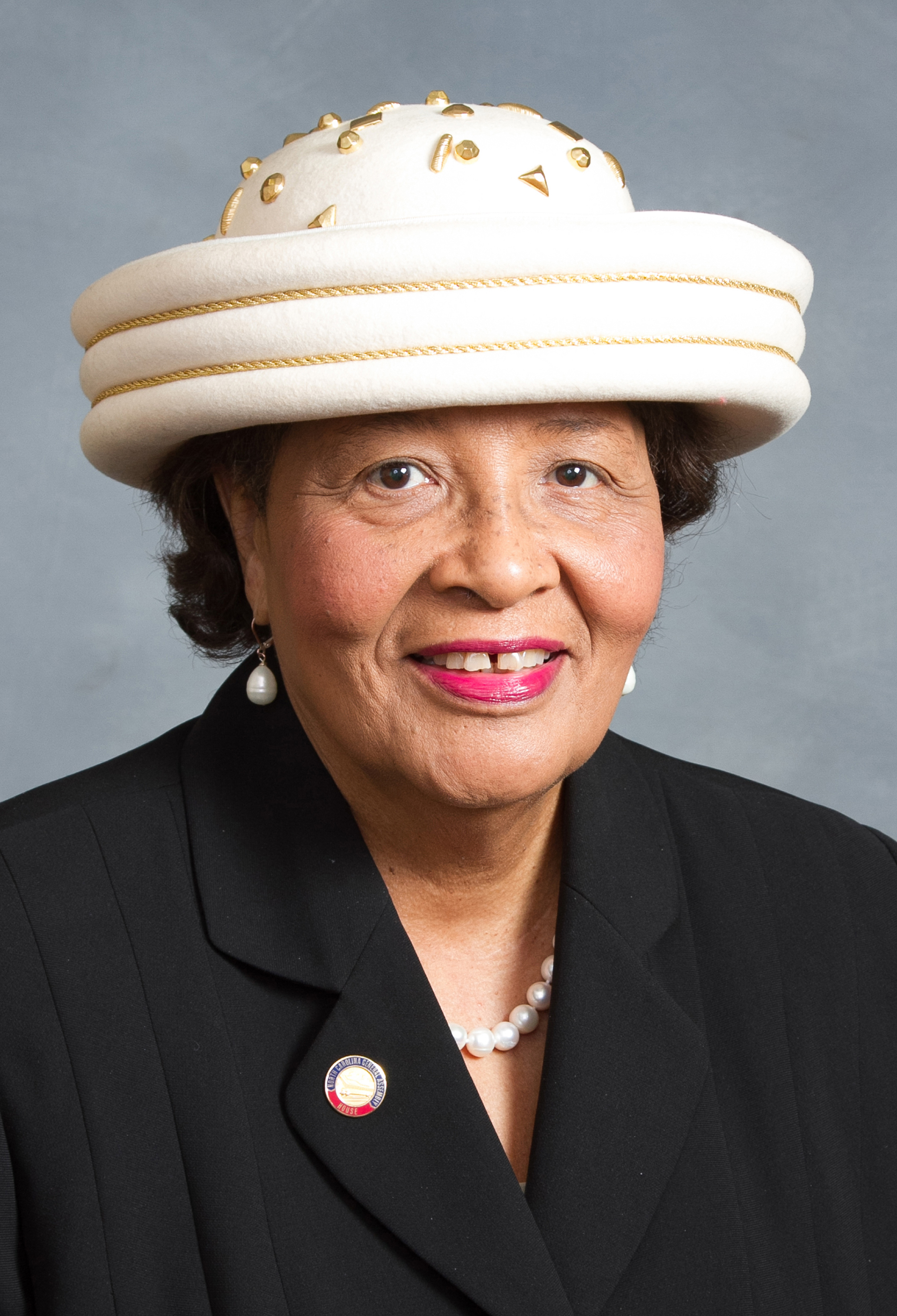
Adam's North Carolina House of Representatives portrait, 2013

Adams defeated Wright and Libertarian challenger Walter Sperko with 66% of the vote in 2004. In the next election Adams had no competition in the primary; she defeated Wright in the general election 66%–34%. In 2008, the year Barack Obama was elected president, Democratic voters had a high rate of participation, and Adams defeated Wright 71.35%–28.65% In 2010, Adams was challenged in the Democratic primary by Ralph C. Johnson. She defeated Johnson with 76.56% of the vote. Adams next faced Republican Darin H. Thomas in the general election, beating him 63.15%–36.85%. In 2012, Adams had no primary opposition and defeated Olga Wright in the general election, 79.86%–20.14%.

During her tenure in the North Carolina House, Adams was elected chair of the North Carolina Legislative Black Caucus and served a second term in that role in 2008. She also chaired the North Carolina Legislative Black Caucus Foundation, which provides scholarships to students attending the state's Historically Black Colleges and Universities. Adams held leadership roles in several committees, including serving as vice chair of the Government Committee, chair of the Appropriations Committee, and vice chair of the Commerce, Small Business, and Entrepreneurship Committee.

== U.S. House of Representatives ==
=== Elections ===
==== 2014 special and general elections ====
In April 2013, Mel Watt, the only congressman to have served the 12th District since its creation in 1993, was appointed director of the Federal Housing Finance Agency. Adams was one of the first to announce that if Watt were confirmed, she would run in the ensuing special election. Watt was confirmed in December 2013. Adams formally filed paperwork to run in both the Democratic primary for a full two-year term in the 114th Congress and the special election held in November 2014 to fill the balance of Watt's 11th term. Adams was sworn in on November 12, 2014, to complete the remaining seven weeks of Watt's term. After the swearing-in, Adams became the 100th female member of the congressional class, beating the previous record of 99.

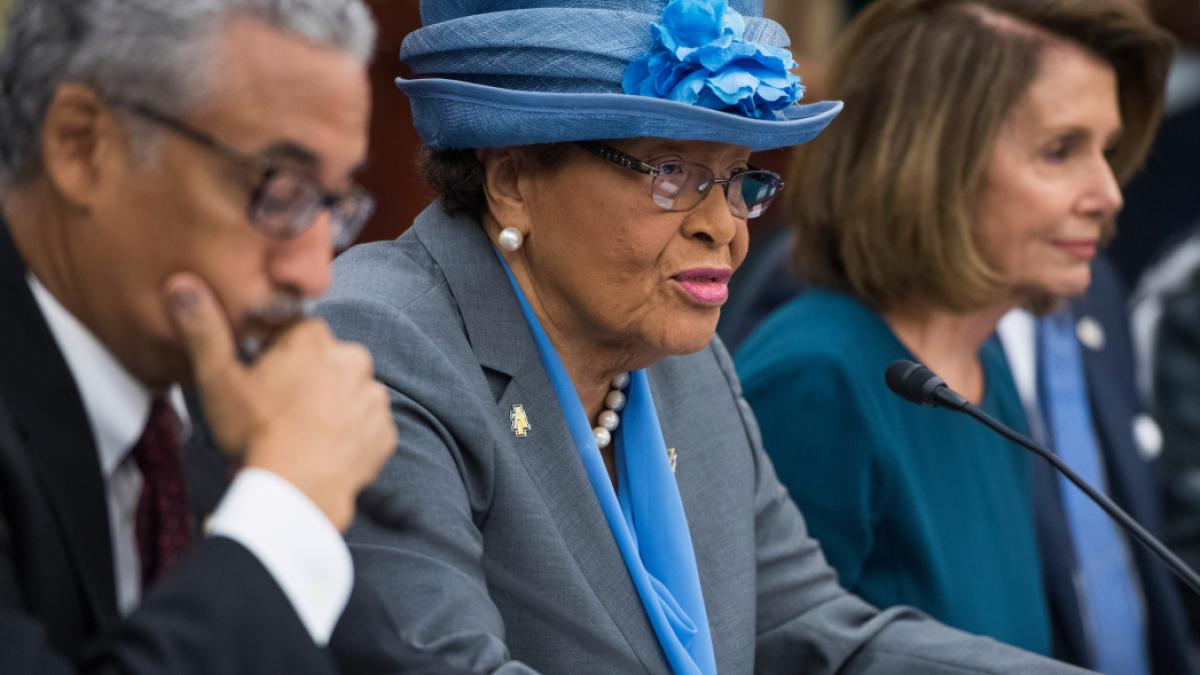
Adams during a congressional hearing sitting next to Speaker of the House Nancy Pelosi

Analysts thought that Adams was at a geographic disadvantage in the five-way primary for both the special and regular elections (held on the same day in November 2014). She is from Greensboro, but the bulk of the district's population is in Charlotte. But with three Charlotteans in the race splitting that region's vote, Adams won both primaries with about 44% of the vote, a few thousand votes over the 40% threshold needed to avoid a runoff. She faced Republican Vince Coakley, a former television and radio broadcaster from Matthews, in the general and special elections, which were held on the same day. The 12th was a heavily Democratic district with a majority-black voting population and a Cook Partisan Voting Index of D+26, and Adams won both elections handily.

Adams is the second woman of color to represent North Carolina in the House. The first was Eva Clayton, who represented much of eastern North Carolina from 1992 to 2002.

==== 2016 ====
A court-ordered redistricting in 2016 made the Adam's 12th district somewhat more compact. It now comprised nearly all of Mecklenburg County, home to Charlotte. Her home in Greensboro was drawn into the 13th district. She subsequently moved to Charlotte to remain in the 12th district. Whether she had moved by June was not clear.

With seven Charlotteans splitting the vote, Adams won the 2016 Democratic primary with 42%, just over the threshold to avoid a runoff. This all but assured her of a second full term; due to Charlotte and Mecklenburg County's heavy swing to the Democrats in recent years, the reconfigured 12th is no less Democratic than its predecessor.

=== Tenure ===
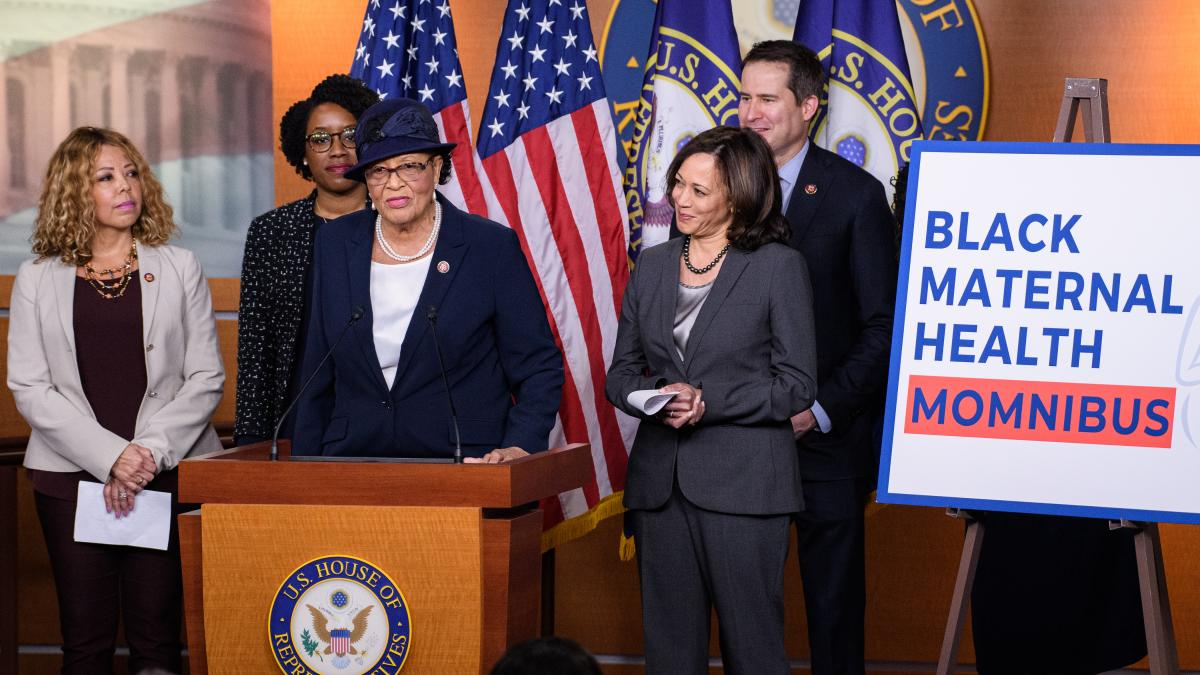
Adams speaks in support of the black maternal health Momnibus bill, 2020

Adams endorsed Hillary Clinton in the 2016 presidential election and pledged her support as a superdelegate. She did not attend the Inauguration of Donald Trump in 2017.

Adams and Representatives A. Donald McEachin and Brian Fitzpatrick introduced the African American Burial Grounds Preservation Act in 2022, would have the National Park Service work with local governments to identify, survey, research, and preserve historic African American cemeteries and burial grounds. The legislation has bipartisan support in the House.

Adams voted to provide Israel with support following the October 7 attacks.

As of June, 2025, Adams has received an "A" rating from the National Organization for the Reform of Marijuana Laws (NORML) based on public statements and voting records.

In 2025, Adams participated in The Price of Excellence, a short documentary produced by The Century Foundation with support from The Kresge Foundation and directed by JD Jones, examining the historical underfunding of HBCUs. Adams co-presented the film at the Congressional Black Caucus Foundation's Annual Legislative Conference in Washington, D.C. on September 25, 2025.

=== Committee assignments ===
- Committee on Agriculture (Vice Chair)
  - Subcommittee on Nutrition, Oversight, and Department Operations
- Committee on Education and Labor
  - Subcommittee on Workforce Protections (Chair)
- Committee on Financial Services
  - Subcommittee on Diversity and Inclusion

=== Caucus memberships ===
- Black Maternal Health Caucus (Co-chair)
- Congressional Progressive Caucus
- Blue Collar Caucus
- Congressional Black Caucus
- Congressional Arts Caucus
- Congressional Caucus for the Equal Rights Amendment
- Congressional Equality Caucus
- Congressional Caucus on Turkey and Turkish Americans

== Personal life ==
Adams is divorced and has two children, four grandchildren, and one great-granddaughter. She is well known for wearing many distinctive hats, and owns more than nine hundred.

== Electoral history ==
=== North Carolina General Assembly ===
North Carolina's 26th State House district results, 1994
Party	Candidate	Votes	%
Democratic	Alma Adams (incumbent)	5,259	68.93
Republican	Roger G. Coffer	2,371	31.07
Total votes		7,630	100
Democratic hold			

North Carolina's 26th State House district results, 1996
Party	Candidate	Votes	%
Democratic	Alma Adams (incumbent)	13,777	73.86
Republican	O.C. "Ozzie" Stafford	4,876	26.14
Total votes		18,653	100
Democratic hold			

North Carolina's 26th State House district results, 1998
Party	Candidate	Votes	%
Democratic	Alma Adams (incumbent)	10,150	74.28
Republican	O.C. "Ozzie" Stafford	3,514	25.72
Total votes		13,664	100
Democratic hold			

North Carolina's 26th State House district results, 2000
Party	Candidate	Votes	%
Democratic	Alma Adams (incumbent)	14,677	73.75
Republican	Jim Rumley	5,224	26.25
Total votes		19,901	100
Democratic hold			

North Carolina's 58th State House district results, 2002
Party	Candidate	Votes	%
Democratic	Alma Adams (incumbent)	14,054	85.83
Libertarian	David Williams	2,320	14.17
Total votes		16,374	100
Democratic hold			

North Carolina's 58th State House district results, 2004
Party	Candidate	Votes	%
Democratic	Alma Adams (incumbent)	21,087	65.74
Republican	Olga Morgan Wright	10,374	32.34
Libertarian	Walter Sperko	618	1.93
Total votes		32,079	100
Democratic hold			

North Carolina's 58th State House district results, 2006
Party	Candidate	Votes	%
Democratic	Alma Adams (incumbent)	10,391	65.63
Republican	Olga Morgan Wright	5,441	34.37
Total votes		15,832	100
Democratic hold			

North Carolina's 58th State House district results, 2008
Party	Candidate	Votes	%
Democratic	Alma Adams (incumbent)	29,113	71.35
Republican	Olga Morgan Wright	11,690	28.65
Total votes		40,803	100
Democratic hold			

North Carolina's 58th State House district results, 2010
Party	Candidate	Votes	%
Democratic	Alma Adams (incumbent)	15,210	63.09
Republican	Darrin H. Thomas	8,899	36.91
Total votes		24,109	100
Democratic hold			

North Carolina's 58th State House district results, 2012
Party	Candidate	Votes	%
Democratic	Alma Adams (incumbent)	32,895	79.86
Republican	Olga Morgan Wright	8,294	20.14
Total votes		41,189	100
Democratic hold			

=== United States Congress ===
North Carolina's 12th congressional district results, 2014
Primary election
Party	Candidate	Votes	%
Democratic	Alma Adams	15,235	44.00
Democratic	Malcolm Graham	8,180	23.63
Democratic	George Battle	4,342	12.54
Democratic	Marcus Brandon	2,856	8.25
Democratic	James "Smuggie" Mitchell	1,775	5.13
Democratic	Curtis C. Osborne	1,733	5.01
Democratic	Rajive Patel	502	1.45
Total votes		34,623	100
General election
Democratic	Alma Adams	130,096	75.35
Republican	Vince Coakley	42,568	24.65
Total votes		172,664	100
Democratic hold			

North Carolina's 12th congressional district results, 2016
Primary election
Party	Candidate	Votes	%
Democratic	Alma Adams (incumbent)	12,400	42.51
Democratic	Malcolm Graham	8,428	28.89
Democratic	Tricia Cotham	6,165	21.13
Democratic	Carla Cunningham	1,255	4.30
Democratic	Gardenia Henley	444	1.52
Democratic	Rodney Moore	245	0.84
Democratic	Rick Miller	235	0.81
Total votes		29,172	100
General election
Democratic	Alma Adams (incumbent)	234,115	67.02
Republican	Leon Threatt	115,185	32.98
Total votes		349,300	100
Democratic hold			

North Carolina's 12th congressional district results, 2018
Party	Candidate	Votes	%
Democratic	Alma Adams (incumbent)	203,974	73.07
Republican	Paul Wright	75,164	26.93
Total votes		279,138	100
Democratic hold			

North Carolina's 12th congressional district results, 2020
Party	Candidate	Votes	%
Democratic	Alma Adams (incumbent)	341,457	100.00
Total votes		341,457	100
Democratic hold			

North Carolina's 12th congressional district results, 2022
Party	Candidate	Votes	%
Democratic	Alma Adams (incumbent)	140,494	62.75
Republican	Tyler Lee	83,414	37.25
Total votes		223,908	100
Democratic hold			

North Carolina's 12th congressional district results, 2024
Party	Candidate	Votes	%
Democratic	Alma Adams (incumbent)	259,627	74.02
Republican	Addul Ali	91,128	25.98
Total votes		350,755	100
Democratic hold			

== See also ==
- List of African-American United States representatives
- Women in the United States House of Representatives

U.S. House of Representatives
Preceded by Mel Watt	Member of the U.S. House of Representatives from North Carolina's 12th congressional district 2014–present	Incumbent
U.S. order of precedence (ceremonial)
Preceded by Katherine Clark	United States representatives by seniority 122nd	Succeeded by Donald Norcross
