= Ruth Braswell Jones =

American educator (1914–2001)

- Born: November 21, 1914; Rocky Mount, North Carolina
- Died: July 6, 2001 (aged 86)
- Occupation: Educator

Ruth Braswell Jones (1914–2001) was an American educator. She is known for serving as president of the North Carolina Teachers Association and the North Carolina Association of Educators. She went on to become the first African American woman to serve on the board of the National Education Association.

== Biography ==
Jones née Braswell was born on November 21, 1914, in Rocky Mount, North Carolina, one of 10 children. She attended Brick Junior College in Enfield, North Carolina, Elizabeth City State University in Elizabeth City, North Carolina, and the North Carolina A&T State University in Greensboro, North Carolina. Jones taught elementary school in North Carolina from 1933 through 1980.

Jones was active in education associations. During the Jim Crow segregation era she served as president of the North Carolina Teachers Association from 1968 to 1970. Following court-mandated school integration she served as president of the North Carolina Association of Educators. Nationally, she served on the board of the National Education Association, the first African American woman on the board.

Jones died on July 6, 2001.
