= Eva Hamlin Miller =

Eva Katherine Hamlin Miller (1911 - 1991) was an artist from Greensboro, North Carolina. She was born and raised in Brooklyn and studied art at the Pratt Institute, Columbia University, the Graduate School of Fine Art in Florence and the University of Ibadan in Nigeria before settling in North Carolina.

She became an art instructor at Bennett College in 1937, and went on to have a long career as an educator in many universities and colleges, as well as the Greensboro city schools.

Along with former student and Greensboro Congresswoman, Alma Adams, Miller helped cofound the African American Atelier in 1990. She served as its curator until her death in 1991.

== Early life ==
Miller was the daughter of Floyd and Katherine Hamlin. She attended the Pratt Institute and earned her B.F.A. degree in fine arts there, then moved on to earn her M.A. in degree in art education at Columbia University.

== Professional positions ==
Hamlin served as associate professor of art at North Carolina A&T State University, in which she founded and owned the Z Gallery. In addition, Miller headed art departments at Bennett College, Tuskegee Institute, and Winston-Salem State University. She was a professor at North Carolina A&T State University. There she founded the HC Taylor Art Gallery. She served 8 years as the art supervisor for Greensboro public schools.

== Personal life ==
Miller married Dr. W. Lloyd T. Miller and had two sons, Floyd T. Miller and Tyrone Miller. Miller also had four grandchildren.

== Works ==
Miller has created many masterpieces. Her art work consists of stained glass art and her paintings of African themes and issues. Listed down below is a list of her artwork. It is sorted by year and alphabetically.

Complexities of the Madonna, 1964

Sound into Sight - A Rhapsody, 1964

Luba Mask, 1968

A time to leave, 1975

Song of Mozambique #2, 1975

Nefertiti, 1991

Skinny Dipping II

...

She also designed the stained-glass windows at Bennett College, Saint James Presbyterian Church, Saint Matthews Methodist Church, and the Shiloh Baptist Church.

Many artists looked up to Miller, including painter and graphic artist John Rogers who collaborated with her multiple times. Miller was adored by her students, many of whom looked to her for mentorship within their own artistic practice, claiming that Rogers made better artists and people.

== Death ==
Miller died on December 26, 1991, in New York City. Her funeral was held at St. James Presbyterian Church and she was buried in Maplewood Cemetery.

== Achievements ==
Miller experienced many achievements throughout her lifetime. In the book Greensboro North Carolina, Otis Hairston writes, "one of the highlights of her career included an invitation by President and Mrs. Carter to the White House for her recognition as a major African-American artist." She was curator of the African American Atelier until she died.
