= George Battle =

American methodist bishop (1947–2025)

George Edward Battle Jr.

Personal details
- Born: May 14, 1947 Edgecombe County, North Carolina, U.S.
- Died: March 9, 2025 (aged 77) Charlotte, North Carolina, U.S.
- Denomination: African Methodist Episcopal Zion Church

George Edward Battle Jr. (May 14, 1947 – March 9, 2025) was an American bishop of the African Methodist Episcopal Zion Church. Born in Edgecombe County, North Carolina, on May 14, 1947, he served as the senior bishop of AME Zion Church to the Piedmont episcopal district from 2012 until his retirement in 2021. He was also a member of the Charlotte-Mecklenburg school board from 1978 to 1995, the latter four years being spent as the board's chairman. Battle died in Charlotte, North Carolina, on March 9, 2025, at the age of 77.
