= North Carolina Association of Educators =

North Carolina Association of Educators (NCAE)
- Founded: 1970
- Headquarters: Raleigh, North Carolina
- Location: United States
- Members: Under 25,000
- Key people: Tamika Walker Kelly, president.
- Affiliations: NEA
- Website: www.ncae.org

The North Carolina Association of Educators (NCAE) is a professional association for public school employees formed in 1970 by the merger of the North Carolina Education Association with the North Carolina Teachers Association. Since North Carolina prohibits collective bargaining by public employees, the NCAE works as a professional development and advocacy organization. It is affiliated with the National Education Association. The organization has under 25,000 members.

== History ==
The history of the NCAE began in 1857 with the formation of the North Carolina Education Association. The North Carolina Teachers Association began in 1880.

The North Carolina Teachers Association was the first African American teachers' association to affiliate with the NEA-Department of Classroom Teachers.

Just like the schools systems were separated along racial lines, so were the two education associations divided. The NC Education Association represented white teachers while the NC Teachers Association represented black teachers. When integration began in the school systems, the two organizations looked to merge as well. The merger of the two groups that created the North Carolina Association of Educators was approved in 1970.

== Structure and governance ==
Officers of the NCAE are elected to four-year terms. The current President is Tamika Walker Kelly. The Vice President is Bryan Proffitt.

== Funding ==
The NCAE is a 501(c)6 tax-exempt organization.

After the Republicans gained control of the North Carolina General Assembly for the first time since 1870, one of the laws passed included Senate Bill 727 which takes away the ability for school employees to have automatic deductions taken out for dues payments to the North Carolina Association of Educators. The NCAE claims that the Republicans specifically targeted their group for retribution with this legislation by using a late-night override of Governor Bev Perdue's veto. In December, 2012, a Wake County Superior Court judge struck down this law stating that it violated the state constitution.

== Notable people ==
- Bernard Allen (1937–2006), Former educator and long-time lobbyist for the NCAE; served in the North Carolina House 2003–2006.
- Elizabeth Duncan Koontz (1919–1989), African-American educator. Led the NC Teachers Association 1959–1963 and president of the National Association of Educators, 1968.
- Ruth Braswell Jones (1914–2001)

== See also ==
- List of education trade unions – includes NEA state affiliates
