= 2007 Charlotte mayoral election =

- 6 November 2007
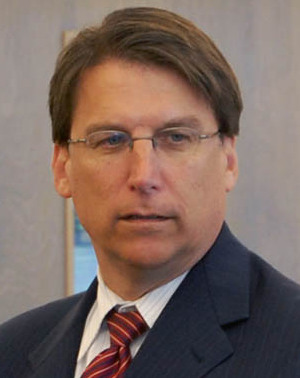

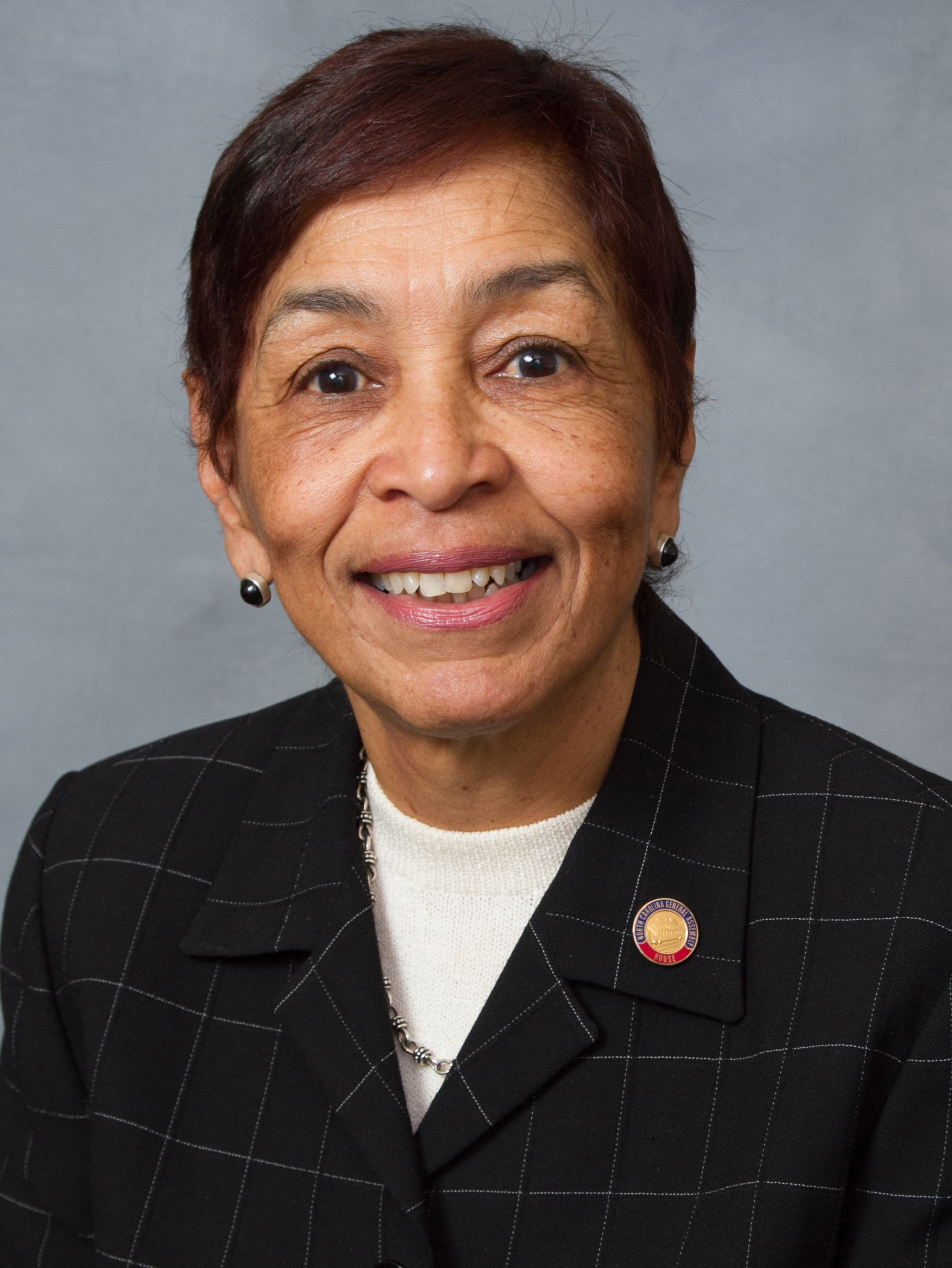
Nominee	Pat McCrory	Beverly Earle
Party	Republican	Democratic
Popular vote	58,501	37,624
Percentage	61%	39%
Mayor before election
Pat McCrory
Republican
Elected mayor
Pat McCrory
Republican

The biennial Charlotte mayoral election was held on November 6, 2007. Mayor Pat McCrory, a Republican, was re-elected to a seventh term.

== Hot button issues ==
- Light rail: was a source of controversy.
- Potential fallout over Charlotte Bobcats Arena: Arena bonds were voted down in 2002 but were later pushed through without voters' permission. This may have cost Republican city councilwoman Lynn Wheeler, a close McCrory ally, her job.
- Growth: Charlotte is one of the fastest-growing cities in the United States. Around 32 people move to Charlotte every day and the city has found it hard to keep up in areas such as education.
- Drunk driving: Charlotte saw a rash of drunk driving incidents, many resulting in deaths, in 2006, leading many to wonder if tougher punishments should be meted out.

== Candidates ==
=== Democrats ===
- Beverly Earle: Seven-term North Carolina State Representative.
- Andy Silver: hypnotherapist dropped out of the race after learning that Earle would run

=== Republicans ===
- Pat McCrory: Six-term incumbent
- Ken Gjertsen: Member of the Charlotte-Mecklenburg Schools Board of Education, Transit tax opponent

== Primary Election Results ==
=== Democratic ===
Beverly Earle was unopposed and did not face a primary.

=== Republican ===
Mayor of Charlotte Republican Primary Election 2007
Party	Candidate	Votes	%
Republican	Pat McCrory (incumbent)	7,432	67
Republican	Ken Gjertsen	3,629	33
Total votes		11,061	100.00

== General Election Results ==
Mayor of Charlotte General Election Results 2007
Party	Candidate	Votes	%
Republican	Pat McCrory (incumbent)	58,501	61
Democratic	Beverly Earle	37,624	39
Total votes		96,125	100.00
