= Fortenberry =

Fortenberry is a surname. Notable people with the surname include:

- Brandon Fortenberry (born 1990), American basketball player
- Jeff Fortenberry (born 1960), American politician from Nebraska
- Joe Fortenberry (1911–1993), American basketball player
- John Fortenberry, American film and television director
- Ken Fortenberry (born 1951), American journalist

== Fictional ==
- Hoyt Fortenberry, fictional character

== See also ==
- Fortenberry Glacier
- Hendrick Jacobs Falkenberg, ancestor of most members of American Fortenberry family
- Nash-Fortenberry UFO sighting
