= 2016 North Carolina gubernatorial election =

- November 8, 2016
- Turnout: 68.98% ▲1.68%
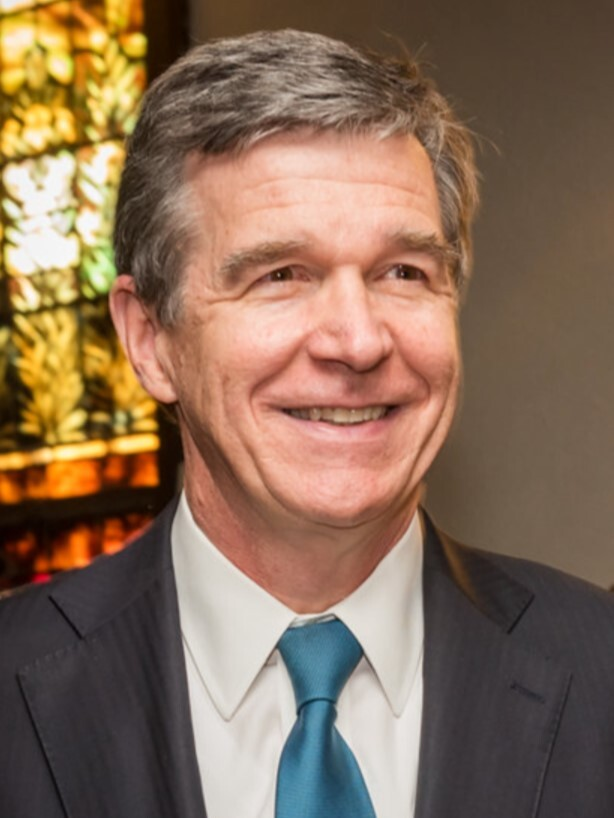

Nominee	Roy Cooper	Pat McCrory
Party	Democratic	Republican
Popular vote	2,309,157	2,298,880
Percentage	49.02%	48.80%
- Cooper: 40–50% 50–60% 60–70% 70–80% 80–90% >90% McCrory: 40–50% 50–60% 60–70% 70–80% 80–90% >90% Tie: 40–50%
Governor before election
Pat McCrory
Republican
Elected Governor
Roy Cooper
Democratic

The 2016 North Carolina gubernatorial election was held on November 8, 2016, concurrently with the 2016 U.S. presidential election, as well as elections to the United States Senate and elections to the United States House of Representatives and various state and local elections. Democratic state Attorney General Roy Cooper won his first term in office, narrowly defeating Republican incumbent Pat McCrory.

Primary elections were held March 15. Both McCrory and Cooper won their primaries by overwhelming margins. Lon Cecil, a consultant and electrical engineer, was the Libertarian nominee. This race was expected to be among the most competitive in the country in the 2016 gubernatorial election cycle.

On election night, the race was too close to call, with Cooper leading by fewer than 5,000 votes out of more than 4.6 million cast. That lead eventually widened to 10,281 votes. Cooper claimed victory that night, with thousands of provisional ballots still yet to be counted, saying, "We have won this race." However, McCrory refused to concede, claiming that the race was still too close to call and the winner had not yet been determined. He cast doubt on the authenticity of 90,000 late-arriving votes from Durham County, which put Cooper in the lead. McCrory's campaign filed complaints alleging voter fraud in over 50 counties. Both campaigns anticipated a protracted legal battle over the results.

On November 22, 2016, McCrory formally requested a statewide recount; once all ballots are counted, North Carolina election law allows either candidate to request a recount if the margin is fewer than 10,000 votes. On November 30, 2016, the North Carolina State Board of Elections ordered a recount of certain votes in Durham County. The recount was slated to be completed on December 5, 2016. However, when early results made it apparent that the margin would not change, McCrory conceded the race to Cooper on the afternoon of December 5.

This was the first time since North Carolina governors became eligible for immediate reelection in 1976 that a sitting officeholder was defeated in a bid for a second term and the only North Carolina gubernatorial election since 1896 in which neither major party nominee received over 50% of the vote.

== Republican primary ==
=== Candidates ===
==== Declared ====
- Robert Brawley, former state representative
- Pat McCrory, incumbent governor
- Charles Moss, preacher, former Randolph County Soil & Water Conservation Board member, Democratic state senate candidate in 2004, and candidate for governor in 2012

==== Declined ====
- Greg Brannon, physician, Tea Party activist and candidate for the U.S. Senate in 2014 (running for U.S. Senate)
- Dan Forest, Lieutenant Governor of North Carolina (running for re-election)

=== Polling ===
Poll source	Date(s) administered	Sample size	Margin of error	Pat McCrory	Charles Moss	Robert Brawley	Undecided
Public Policy Polling	March 11–13, 2016	749	± 3.6%	70%	7%	6%	17%
High Point University	March 9–10, 2016	734	± 2.5%	73%	6%	8%	13%
SurveyUSA	March 4–7, 2016	688	± 3.6%	66%	6%	9%	19%
SurveyUSA	February 14–16, 2016	437	± 4.5%	67%	–	17%	16%
Public Policy Polling	February 14–16, 2016	597	± 4.0%	69%	4%	5%	22%
High Point University	January 30–February 4, 2016	477	± 4.5%	75%	3%	2%	20%
Public Policy Polling	January 18–19, 2016	433	± 3.2%	68%	6%	4%	22%

Hypothetical polling

Poll source	Date(s) administered	Sample size	Margin of error	Pat McCrory	Dan Forest	Undecided
Public Policy Polling	August 12–16, 2015	406	± 4.9%	60%	20%	20%

=== Results ===
Republican primary results
Party	Candidate	Votes	%
Republican	Pat McCrory (incumbent)	869,114	82.0%
Republican	Robert Brawley	112,624	11.0%
Republican	Charles Moss	81,315	7.0%
Total votes		1,063,053	100.00%

== Democratic primary ==
=== Candidates ===
==== Declared ====
- Roy Cooper, North Carolina Attorney General
- Kenneth Spaulding, former state representative and candidate for North Carolina's 2nd congressional district in 1984

==== Withdrawn ====
- James Protzman, businessman and former Chapel Hill town council member

==== Declined ====
- Janet Cowell, North Carolina State Treasurer (not seeking re-election or running for any other office)
- Anthony Foxx, United States Secretary of Transportation and former Mayor of Charlotte
- Kay Hagan, former U.S. Senator, and former State Senator
- Charles Meeker, former mayor of Raleigh (running for Labor Commissioner)
- Heath Shuler, former U.S. Representative
- Josh Stein, state senator and former deputy attorney general of North Carolina (running for Attorney General)

=== Polling ===
Poll source	Date(s) administered	Sample size	Margin of error	Roy Cooper	Kenneth Spaulding	Other	Undecided
Public Policy Polling	March 11–13, 2016	746	± 3.6%	53%	17%	—	30%
High Point University	March 9–10, 2016	669	± 2.5%	64%	18%	—	19%
SurveyUSA	March 4–7, 2016	687	± 3.8%	51%	19%	—	30%
SurveyUSA	February 14–16, 2016	449	± 4.7%	50%	21%	—	29%
Public Policy Polling	February 14–16, 2016	575	± 4.1%	55%	12%	—	33%
High Point University	January 30–February 4, 2016	478	± 4.5%	49%	11%	—	40%
Public Policy Polling	January 18–19, 2016	461	± 3.2%	55%	10%	—	35%
Public Policy Polling	December 5–7, 2015	555	± 2.8%	54%	10%	—	36%
Public Policy Polling	October 23–25, 2015	421	± 4.8%	58%	13%	—	29%

Hypothetical polling

Poll source	Date(s) administered	Sample size	Margin of error	Roy Cooper	Anthony Foxx	Kay Hagan	Charles Meeker	Kenneth Spaulding	Other/ Undecided
Civitas Institute	March 20–23, 2015	400	± 5%	31%	7%	43%	3%	4%	12%

=== Results ===
Results by county: Cooper: Cooper—80–90%; Cooper—70–80%; Cooper—60–70%; Cooper—50–60%; Spaulding: Spaulding—50–60%; Spaulding—60–70%

Democratic primary results
Party	Candidate	Votes	%
Democratic	Roy Cooper	710,658	69.0%
Democratic	Kenneth Spaulding	323,774	31.0%
Total votes		1,034,432	100.0%

== Libertarian primary ==
=== Candidates ===
==== Declared ====
- Lon Cecil, retired engineer and nominee for NC-12 in 2010

==== Withdrawn ====
- Ken Fortenberry, newspaper publisher, author, journalist and Republican candidate for North Carolina's 10th congressional district in 2012

==== Declined ====
- Sean Haugh, pizza delivery man and nominee for the U.S. Senate in 2002 and 2014 (running for U.S. Senate)

== Write-in candidates ==
=== Declared ===
- Daniel Orr, navy veteran

== General election ==
=== Debates ===
- Complete video of debate, October 11, 2016 - C-SPAN
- Complete video of debate, October 18, 2016 - C-SPAN

=== Predictions ===
Source	Ranking	As of
The Cook Political Report	Tossup	August 12, 2016
Daily Kos	Tossup	November 8, 2016
Rothenberg Political Report	Tilt D (flip)	November 3, 2016
Sabato's Crystal Ball	Lean D (flip)	November 7, 2016
Real Clear Politics	Tossup	November 1, 2016
Governing	Tossup	October 27, 2016

=== Polling ===
Aggregate polls

Source of poll aggregation	Dates administered	Dates updated	Pat McCrory (R)	Roy Cooper (D)	Other/Undecided (Note: Calculated by taking the difference of 100% and all other candidates combined.)	Margin
Real Clear Politics	October 23 – November 6, 2016	November 6, 2016	46.2%	48.4%	5.4%	Cooper +2.2%

Poll source	Date(s) administered	Sample size	Margin of error	Pat McCrory (R)	Roy Cooper (D)	Lon Cecil (L)	Other	Undecided
SurveyMonkey	November 1–7, 2016	3,126	± 4.6%	43%	54%	—	—	3%
New York Times Upshot/Siena College	November 4–6, 2016	800	± 3.5%	46%	47%	—	—	7%
Quinnipiac University	November 3–6, 2016	870	± 3.3%	47%	50%	—	1%	3%
SurveyMonkey	October 31–November 6, 2016	2,865	± 4.6%	43%	54%	—	—	3%
SurveyMonkey	October 28–November 3, 2016	2,292	± 4.6%	44%	53%	—	—	3%
SurveyMonkey	October 27–November 2, 2016	1,886	± 4.6%	45%	53%	—	—	2%
Quinnipiac University	October 27–November 1, 2016	602	± 4.0%	47%	49%	—	1%	3%
SurveyMonkey	October 26–November 1, 2016	1,617	± 4.6%	45%	52%	—	—	3%
SurveyUSA	October 28–31, 2016	659	± 3.9%	47%	48%	2%	—	4%
SurveyMonkey	October 25–31, 2016	1,574	± 4.6%	46%	52%	—	—	2%
CBS News/YouGov	October 26–28, 2016	992	± 4.1%	44%	46%	—	1%	9%
Elon University Poll	October 23–27, 2016	710	± 3.7%	44%	44%	1%	3%	8%
NBC/WSJ/Marist	October 25–26, 2016	780 LV	± 3.5%	45%	51%	—	2%	2%
NBC/WSJ/Marist	October 25–26, 2016	1,018 RV	± 3.1%	45%	50%	—	3%	3%
Quinnipiac University	October 20–26, 2016	702	± 3.7%	47%	49%	—	—	3%
New York Times Upshot/Siena College	October 20–23, 2016	792	± 3.5%	45%	51%	—	—	4%
Monmouth University	October 20–23, 2016	402	± 4.9%	48%	47%	2%	—	3%
Public Policy Polling	October 21–22, 2016	875	± 3.3%	44%	46%	3%	—	8%
The Times-Picayune/Lucid	October 17–18, 2016	924	± 3.0%	43%	50%	—	—	7%
SurveyUSA	October 14–18, 2016	651	± 3.9%	45%	47%	3%	—	5%
Civitas Institute (R)	October 14–17, 2016	600	± 4.0%	46%	42%	—	—	10%
Washington Post/SurveyMonkey	October 8–16, 2016	1,191	± 0.5%	42%	55%	—	—	2%
CNN/ORC	October 10–15, 2016	788 LV	± 3.5%	48%	49%	—	—	2%
CNN/ORC	October 10–15, 2016	929 RV	± 3.0%	47%	49%	—	—	2%
NBC/WSJ/Marist	October 10–12, 2016	743 LV	± 3.6%	48%	49%	—	1%	3%
NBC/WSJ/Marist	October 10–12, 2016	1,025 RV	± 3.1%	47%	48%	—	1%	4%
High Point University	October 1–6, 2016	479	± 4.5%	42%	49%	3%	—	5%
SurveyUSA	September 29–October 3, 2016	656	± 3.9%	44%	48%	2%	—	6%
Bloomberg/Selzer	September 29–October 3, 2016	805	± 3.5%	44%	50%	—	—	6%
Quinnipiac University	September 27–October 2, 2016	507	± 4.4%	46%	48%	—	—	6%
Elon University Poll	September 27–30, 2016	660	± 3.8%	44%	48%	3%	—	5%
Public Policy Polling	September 27–28, 2016	861	± 3.3%	42%	45%	4%	—	9%
Public Policy Polling	September 27–28, 2016	861	± 3.3%	44%	49%	—	—	7%
Meredith College	September 18–22, 2016	487	± 4.4%	41%	39%	1%	6%	14%
High Point University	September 17–22, 2016	404	± 4.9%	41%	50%	3%	—	5%
FOX News	September 18–20, 2016	734 LV	± 3.5%	46%	43%	3%	1%	7%
FOX News	September 18–20, 2016	800 RV	± 3.5%	45%	42%	3%	1%	9%
Public Policy Polling	September 18–20, 2016	1,024	± 3.1%	41%	46%	2%	—	11%
Public Policy Polling	September 18–20, 2016	1,024	± 3.1%	43%	50%	—	—	8%
New York Times Upshot/Siena College	September 16–19, 2016	782	± 3.6%	42%	50%	—	—	7%
Elon University Poll	September 12–16, 2016	644	± 3.9%	49%	46%	2%	—	3%
Civitas Institute (R)	September 11–12, 2016	600	± 4.0%	45%	43%	1%	—	9%
Quinnipiac University	August 29–September 7, 2016	751	± 3.6%	44%	51%	—	—	5%
Monmouth University	August 20–23, 2016	401	± 4.9%	43%	52%	3%	—	3%
CNN/ORC	August 18–23, 2016	803 LV	± 3.5%	46%	52%	—	—	2%
CNN/ORC	August 18–23, 2016	912 RV	± 3.5%	46%	52%	—	—	2%
NBC/WSJ/Marist	August 4–10, 2016	921	± 3.2%	44%	51%	—	—	5%
Public Policy Polling	August 5–7, 2016	830	± 3.4%	42%	43%	4%	—	11%
NBC/WSJ/Marist	July 5–11, 2016	907	± 3.3%	45%	49%	—	1%	5%
Civitas Institute (R)	June 21–23, 2016	600	± 4.0%	45%	40%	3%	—	10%
Public Policy Polling	June 20–21, 2016	947	± 3.2%	41%	41%	6%	—	13%
Civitas Institute (R)	May 21–23, 2016	600	± 4.0%	45%	40%	3%	—	11%
Public Policy Polling	May 20–22, 2016	928	± 3.2%	41%	41%	5%	—	13%
RABA Research	April 27–28, 2016	688	± 3.7%	36%	41%	6%	—	17%
Civitas Institute (R)	April 23–25, 2016	600	± 4.0%	39%	48%	5%	—	8%
Public Policy Polling	April 22–24, 2016	960	± 3.2%	42%	43%	4%	—	11%
Elon University Poll	April 10–15, 2016	621	± 3.9%	42%	48%	—	6%	5%
SurveyUSA	April 8–11, 2016	701	± 3.8%	43%	47%	2%	—	8%
Public Policy Polling	March 18–20, 2016	843	± 3.4%	42%	40%	6%	—	12%
High Point University	March 9–10, 2016	1,576	± 2.5%	47%	45%	—	—	8%
Elon University Poll	February 15–19, 2016	1,530	± 2.5%	40%	42%	—	3%	15%
Public Policy Polling	February 14–16, 2016	1,291	± 2.7%	43%	41%	—	—	16%
SurveyUSA	February 14–16, 2016	1,250	± 2.8%	45%	42%	—	—	12%
Public Policy Polling	January 18–19, 2016	948	± 3.2%	40%	43%	—	—	17%
Public Policy Polling	December 5–7, 2015	1,214	± 2.8%	44%	42%	—	—	14%
Elon University Poll	October 29–November 2, 2015	1,040	± 3.0%	40%	45%	—	3%	13%
Public Policy Polling	October 23–25, 2015	893	± 3.3%	43%	44%	—	—	13%
Public Policy Polling	September 24–27, 2015	1,268	± 2.8%	44%	41%	—	—	15%
Elon University Poll	September 17–21, 2015	1,258	± 3.0%	43%	42%	—	3%	11%
Public Policy Polling	August 12–16, 2015	957	± 3.2%	39%	42%	—	—	18%
Civitas Institute (R)	August 10–12, 2015	400	± 4.0%	32%	34%	—	—	33%
Public Policy Polling	July 2–6, 2015	529	± 4.3%	41%	43%	—	—	16%
Civitas Institute (R)	June 23–25, 2015	600	± 4.0%	43%	38%	—	—	17%
Public Policy Polling	May 28–31, 2015	561	± 4.1%	41%	44%	—	—	15%
Elon University Poll	April 20–24, 2015	677	± 3.8%	45%	43%	—	4%	8%
Public Policy Polling	April 2–5, 2015	751	± 3.6%	44%	41%	—	—	15%
Public Policy Polling	February 24–26, 2015	849	± 3.4%	43%	41%	—	—	16%
Diversified Research	February 2–3, 2015	800	± 3.5%	44%	42%	—	—	14%
Public Policy Polling	January 29–31, 2015	845	± 3.4%	44%	39%	—	—	17%
Meeting Street Research	January 21–22, 2015	500	± 4.4%	47%	44%	—	—	9%
Public Policy Polling	December 4–7, 2014	823	± 3.4%	46%	39%	—	—	15%
Gravis Marketing	October 29–30, 2014	1,006	± 3.0%	47%	45%	—	—	8%
Gravis Marketing	October 16–18, 2014	1,022	± 3.0%	49%	41%	—	—	9%
Gravis Marketing	September 22–23, 2014	860	± 3.0%	45%	42%	—	—	12%
Public Policy Polling	September 11–14, 2014	1,266	± 2.8%	44%	41%	—	—	15%
Public Policy Polling	August 14–17, 2014	856	± 3.4%	44%	43%	—	—	14%
Gravis Marketing	July 22–27, 2014	1,380	± 3.0%	44%	46%	—	—	10%
Public Policy Polling	June 12–15, 2014	1,076	± 3.0%	44%	42%	—	—	14%
Public Policy Polling	May 9–11, 2014	877	± 3.3%	43%	42%	—	—	15%
Public Policy Polling	April 3–6, 2014	740	± 3.6%	43%	43%	—	—	15%
Public Policy Polling	February 6–9, 2014	708	± 3.7%	43%	41%	—	—	15%
Public Policy Polling	September 6–9, 2013	600	± 4.0%	42%	48%	—	—	11%

Hypothetical polling

with Pat McCrory

Poll source	Date(s) administered	Sample size	Margin of error	Pat McCrory (R)	Kenneth Spaulding (D)	Other	Undecided
Public Policy Polling	February 14–16, 2016	1,291	± 2.7%	44%	32%	—	24%
SurveyUSA	February 14–16, 2016	1,250	± 2.8%	48%	38%	—	15%
Public Policy Polling	January 18–19, 2016	948	± 3.2%	43%	34%	—	22%
Public Policy Polling	December 5–7, 2015	1,214	± 2.8%	47%	32%	—	21%
Public Policy Polling	October 23–25, 2015	893	± 3.3%	46%	31%	—	23%
Public Policy Polling	September 24–27, 2015	1,268	± 2.8%	46%	34%	—	21%
Public Policy Polling	August 12–16, 2015	957	± 3.2%	40%	35%	—	25%
Public Policy Polling	July 2–6, 2015	529	± 4.3%	43%	33%	—	24%
Public Policy Polling	May 28–31, 2015	561	± 4.1%	43%	32%	—	25%
Public Policy Polling	April 2–5, 2015	751	± 3.6%	46%	33%	—	21%
Public Policy Polling	February 24–26, 2015	849	± 3.4%	44%	35%	—	21%
Public Policy Polling	January 29–31, 2015	845	± 3.4%	47%	36%	—	17%

Poll source	Date(s) administered	Sample size	Margin of error	Pat McCrory (R)	Janet Cowell (D)	Undecided
Public Policy Polling	December 4–7, 2014	823	± 3.4%	47%	36%	16%
Public Policy Polling	September 6–9, 2013	600	± 4%	43%	47%	10%

Poll source	Date(s) administered	Sample size	Margin of error	Pat McCrory (R)	Anthony Foxx (D)	Undecided
Public Policy Polling	December 4–7, 2014	823	± 3.4%	48%	34%	18%

Poll source	Date(s) administered	Sample size	Margin of error	Pat McCrory (R)	Kay Hagan (D)	Undecided
Meeting Street Research	January 21–22, 2015	500	± 4.38%	50%	42%	8%

Poll source	Date(s) administered	Sample size	Margin of error	Pat McCrory (R)	Charles Meeker (D)	Undecided
Public Policy Polling	April 3–6, 2014	740	± 3.6%	45%	38%	17%
Public Policy Polling	September 6–9, 2013	600	± 4%	42%	45%	13%

Poll source	Date(s) administered	Sample size	Margin of error	Pat McCrory (R)	Josh Stein (D)	Undecided
Public Policy Polling	September 6–9, 2013	600	± 4%	42%	44%	14%

with Phil Berger

Poll source	Date(s) administered	Sample size	Margin of error	Phil Berger (R)	Roy Cooper (D)	Undecided
Public Policy Polling	December 4–7, 2014	823	± 3.4%	35%	41%	24%

Poll source	Date(s) administered	Sample size	Margin of error	Phil Berger (R)	Janet Cowell (D)	Undecided
Public Policy Polling	December 4–7, 2014	823	± 3.4%	37%	38%	25%

Poll source	Date(s) administered	Sample size	Margin of error	Phil Berger (R)	Anthony Foxx (D)	Undecided
Public Policy Polling	December 4–7, 2014	823	± 3.4%	39%	36%	25%

with Dan Forest

Poll source	Date(s) administered	Sample size	Margin of error	Dan Forest (R)	Roy Cooper (D)	Undecided
Public Policy Polling	August 12–16, 2015	957	± 3.2%	33%	42%	25%

=== Preliminary results and legal battle ===
North Carolina's gubernatorial election, 2016
Party	Candidate	Votes	%	±%
Democratic	Roy Cooper	2,309,162	49.02%	+5.79%
Republican	Pat McCrory (incumbent)	2,298,881	48.80%	−5.82%
Libertarian	Lon Cecil	102,978	2.19%	+0.06%
Margin of victory		10,281	0.22%	−7.92%
Turnout		4,711,021	68.98%	+1.68%
Democratic gain from Republican				

Polls closed at 7:30 pm on election day. On election night, as votes were tallied, Cooper held an early lead, but was overtaken by McCrory around 9:30 pm, and McCrory held the lead for most of the evening. Shortly before midnight, McCrory held a 60,000 vote lead until a block of 90,000 votes from Durham County was added to the total, putting Cooper back in the lead by fewer than 5,000 votes out of 4,500,000 cast. Both candidates addressed supporters around 12:30 am; Cooper declared victory, while McCrory vowed the race was not over and that every vote needed to be counted.

Under North Carolina state law, absentee ballots postmarked on or before election day must be counted, and military and overseas ballots accepted through November 17 must also be counted. Additionally, election administrators "must decide the eligibility of more than 60,000 provisional ballots and the validity of thousands of challenged votes." This process, plus a protracted legal challenge from the McCrory campaign, was likely to leave the election result not formally decided for some time after election day.

McCrory's campaign said that it had "grave concerns over potential irregularities in Durham County." Republican Party of North Carolina Chairman Robin Hayes called Cooper's declaration of victory "rude and grossly premature." On November 10, 2016, both campaigns announced they had retained attorneys in anticipation of a protracted legal battle: Cooper hired lawyers from Washington-based firm Perkins Coie (including Marc Elias), while McCrory hired lawyers from Virginia-based firm Holtzman Vogel Josefiak.

Once all ballots are counted, North Carolina election law allows either candidate to request a recount if the margin is fewer than 10,000 votes.

On November 12, the general counsel of the Durham County Republican Party filed a formal protest with the Durham County Board of Elections alleging "malfeasance" in the tallying of votes in Durham County and calling for a recount. McCrory's campaign said that the 90,000 votes added to the total late on election night appeared to have come from corrupted memory cards. A campaign spokesman said, "What transpired in Durham County is extremely troubling and no citizen can have confidence in the results at this point in time."

On November 14, WRAL reported that there was speculation among political operatives about whether the race could possibly be contested and handed to the North Carolina General Assembly to determine the winner, as was done in 2005, when the General Assembly made June Atkinson the winner of a disputed election for the office of North Carolina Superintendent of Public Instruction. North Carolina House Speaker Tim Moore said getting the General Assembly involved would be "an absolute last resort".

Also on November 14, WRAL reported that the State Bureau of Investigation was investigating whether crimes were committed in the mishandling of 1,000 ballots in the March 2016 primaries in Durham County, the likely epicenter of the battle over the gubernatorial race. The Durham County electoral board chairman said there was no connection between the investigation and the gubernatorial race.

On November 15 Bladen County Soil and Water Conservation District Supervisor McCrae Dowless, a Republican and the incumbent for reelection, filed a protest with that county's board of elections over several hundred absentee ballots cast for Cooper and other Democrats, claiming that they were fraudulent; on the basis of similarity of the handwriting with which they were filled out. In his initial filing, Dowless claimed corroboration by a handwriting expert. The complainant had initially expressed concerns about voter fraud related to his own reelection campaign, and before election day. The McCrory campaign alleged that the ballots were filled out by paid employees of the Bladen County Improvement Association PAC, a political action committee that received funding from the North Carolina Democratic Party. The complaint alleged that one person served as a witness for at least 67 mail-in absentee ballots, and the same person appeared to have filled out the selections on 71 ballots. It said there were at least 250 questionable ballots connected to five people paid by the Bladen County Improvement Association PAC. That organization has responded that the people involved were volunteers with their get-out-the-vote effort, and that the only payments made to them were small stipends for expenses incurred as part of that activity; such as food and gas costs. The McCrory campaign stated, "A massive voting fraud scheme has been uncovered in Bladen County." In response, the Cooper campaign stated: "Governor McCrory has set a new standard for desperation in his attempts to undermine the results of an election he lost."

On November 16, the McCrory campaign announced it had filed election protests alleging fraud in 11 more counties. On November 17, the McCrory campaign announced the number of counties in which it had filed protests alleging voter fraud had grown to 50 counties, which the Associated Press reported were "without offering detailed proof."

Every county election board in the state has three members: two Republican appointees and one Democrat.

Durham County has been seen as the most pivotal county, as it has the most votes at stake. On November 16, the Durham County Board of Elections voted 2–1 to hold an evidentiary hearing on election protest about the ballots in Durham County. At the hearing on November 18, the board unanimously dismissed the protest, with the board's Republican chairman, William Brian Jr., saying that all the evidence shows that the count is correct.

By November 18, Cooper's unofficial advantage over McCrory had grown to about 6,600 votes, out of almost 4.7 million cast.

On November 20, the state Board of Elections held an emergency meeting. They declined a McCrory campaign petition for the state board to take jurisdiction over all 50 county election protests, except for the one in Bladen County, which they took over. They decided to convene another meeting on November 22 to issue guidance to county boards on how to handle the protests.

On November 22, the McCrory campaign formally requested a statewide recount.

Also on November 22, the Civitas Institute filed a federal lawsuit seeking an injunction to delay the State Board of Elections' count of ballots of unverified same-day registrants, alleging that there is not enough time to verify the eligibility of voters who registered to vote on election day. Civitas said that neither the McCrory campaign nor the state Republican Party were involved in the lawsuit. Civitas cited a 2012 review conducted by the state Board of Elections that found 2.44% of voters who used same-day registration in 2012 failed the verification process, but the process was not completely finished when the ballots were counted. A court hearing is scheduled for December 8.

On November 26, the Durham County Republican Party's general counsel asked the state Board of Elections to hold an expedited hearing on his appeal of the Durham County Board of Elections' refusal to conduct a recount of that county's votes. The campaign stated they would withdraw their request for a statewide recount if a manual recount of Durham County votes produced the same results as were reported on election day.

On November 30, the State Board of Elections ordered a recount of the Durham County votes. The recount was to be completed by 7 p.m. on December 5. However, by that morning, early results showed no change in the tally. McCrory announced on his campaign's YouTube channel that he was conceding the race to Cooper, saying that it was now clear that "the majority of our citizens had spoken."

=== Official results ===
North Carolina's gubernatorial election, 2016
Party	Candidate	Votes	%	±%
Democratic	Roy Cooper	2,309,157	49.02%	+5.79%
Republican	Pat McCrory (incumbent)	2,298,880	48.80%	−5.82%
Libertarian	Lon Cecil	102,977	2.19%	+0.06%
Total votes		4,711,014	100.00%	N/A
Democratic gain from Republican				

==== Counties that flipped from Democratic to Republican ====
- Bladen (largest town: Elizabethtown)
- Gates (largest town: Gatesville)
- Martin (largest town: Williamston)
- Robeson (largest city: Lumberton)

==== Counties that flipped from Republican to Democratic ====
- Chatham (largest municipality: Siler City)
- Forsyth (largest town: Winston-Salem)
- Granville (largest city: Oxford)
- Jackson (largest town: Sylva)
- Mecklenburg (largest municipality: Charlotte)
- Nash (largest city: Rocky Mount)
- New Hanover (largest municipality: Wilmington)
- Wake (largest town: Raleigh)
- Watauga (largest town: Boone)

== Aftermath ==
Following the election, the General Assembly, controlled by Republicans, passed legislation that would limit the incoming governor's powers. Democrats have referred to the move as a power grab, and Republicans have countered that Democrats have made similar moves when they controlled the legislature.
