= Cecil Bothwell =

American politician

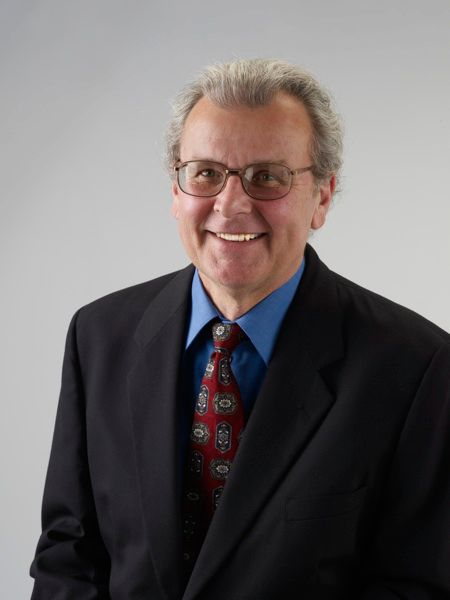

Member of the Asheville, North Carolina city council
- In office December 8, 2009 – December 7, 2017

Personal details
- Born: 1950 (age 75–76) Oak Park, Illinois, United States
- Party: Democratic Party (before 2016, 2017–present); Independent (2016–2017)
- Spouse: Divorced
- Occupation: Politician, writer, builder, artist, musician

Cecil Bothwell (born 16 October 1950) is an American politician, writer, artist, musician and builder. Bothwell was elected to the Asheville, North Carolina city council in 2009 and reelected in 2013, but lost in the 2017 primary, coming in 7th out of 12 candidates.

In 2011, Bothwell announced he would challenge U.S. Representative Heath Shuler in the Democratic primary for North Carolina's 11th congressional district in the 2012 U.S. House of Representatives election. On May 8, 2012, he lost the Democratic primary to Hayden Rogers by a margin of 55–30 percent.

== Early life and career ==
Bothwell was born in 1950 in Oak Park, Illinois, graduated from Winter Park High School lived in several states and held several jobs in the area of Asheville, North Carolina. Bothwell moved to Buncombe County, North Carolina in 1981 to work in construction with an emphasis on environmental building. He was an editor of the alternative newspaper Mountain Xpress and published nonfiction and poetry as well as music. Bothwell is the author of Usin' the Juice: an oratorio; Whale Falls: An exploration of belief and its consequences; The Prince of War: Billy Graham's Crusade for a Wholly Christian Empire, which reports on the political activity of North Carolina preacher Billy Graham; Asheville's best-selling guide book; and a syndicated column, "Duck Soup".

Following Bothwell's loss in the 2017 election, Joel Burgess, reporter for the Asheville Citizen-Times, wrote a retrospective on his years shaping the Asheville political scene.

== Local politics ==
In 2008, Bothwell ran unsuccessfully for the Buncombe County Board of Commissioners, and ran for the Asheville, North Carolina city council in 2009, winning the most votes in the October 6 primary election. Bothwell raised more than $19,000 for his council election and ran as a progressive candidate in support of water conservation, government reform, and eliminating capital punishment. He stated that he favored the public financing of elections and would support its implementation as a city council member. Bothwell had been endorsed by the Asheville Fire Fighters Association. Fliers mailed to voters before the election criticized Bothwell for his nontheism.

Bothwell was elected on November 3, 2009, to the city council after he won the third highest number of votes in the city election. Following the election, opponents of Bothwell, including H. K. Edgerton, a former president of the Asheville NAACP, challenged his election because the Constitution of North Carolina does not allow for atheists to hold public office in the state. Law experts argued the provision was invalid because the United States Constitution prevents religious tests for public office. The Supreme Court of the United States held in Torcaso v. Watkins (1961) that such provisions violate the First and Fourteenth Amendments to the U.S. Constitution. Bothwell began his service with an affirmation of the oath of office. Bothwell was raised as a Presbyterian, became a non-theist by the age of 20, and is a member of the Unitarian Universalist Church. He later stated that he believed the question of the existence of a deity was irrelevant to governance and that he believed in the Golden Rule. He has also described himself as a "post theist."

Consequent to the well-publicized challenge to his investiture in office, Bothwell was named the most Courageous Elected Official of 2010 by the American Atheists. He became a frequent speaker at humanist, secular and atheist conferences across the U.S., speaking in dozens of cities in 12 states and Washington D.C. in ensuing years.

In 2011, he announced his intent to challenge blue dog Congressman Heath Shuler in the 2012 Democratic primary. When Shuler declined to run for reelection under the new Republican-drawn redistricted maps, Bothwell stayed in the race, coming in second in a three-way primary behind Schuler's chief of staff, Hayden Rogers, who in turn, was defeated by Mark Meadows in the general election.

Bothwell was reelected to city council in 2013.

On June 19, 2014, Bothwell was pulled over after a state highway patrol officer noticed he was driving a car with no license plate, which belonged to one of his friends. The car was legally registered, legally had no plate, and Bothwell had committed no moving violation. Bothwell was arrested and charged with suspected DUI. An hour or more later he registered a .10 on a breathalyzer, above the .08 legal limit for driving. The arresting officer denied he knew who was in the vehicle before it was pulled over and claimed Bothwell was cooperative. Bothwell acknowledged his wrongdoing in an interview with WLOS and agreed to appear in court on August 4. Soon after Bothwell denied that he willfully violated the law. Some residents called for his resignation. While Bothwell's attorney asserted that the stop itself was illegal since there was no moving violation and driving without a tag is legal under North Carolina law, when the case was adjudicated in November 2014, the District Attorney threatened to pursue charges against the car's owner for aiding and abetting (which would have accorded the friend the equivalent of a DUI on her record). Bothwell chose to plead guilty instead of challenging the wrongful arrest.

In July 2016, he officially de-registered as a Democrat and switched to Independent, as he would not be supporting Hillary Clinton for president due to his previous support for Bernie Sanders and disillusionment with the party's current political views. He later officially endorsed Jill Stein for president.

In January 2017, citing the enthusiasm generated by Our Revolution (the ongoing Sanders campaign to change the direction of the Democratic Party), Bothwell re-registered as a Democrat.

On October 10, 2017, Bothwell lost in the 2017 Asheville primary local election, finishing 7th out of 12 candidates. This might be considered a surprising rebuke, given that Bothwell had been tapped as the #1 local politician in the local weekly Mountain Xpress reader poll in 7 of the 8 years he served on Council, falling to #2 in 2017. Bothwell's successor, Indian-American businessman Vijay Kapoor, was sworn into office on December 7, 2017.
