= Ken Fortenberry =

Ken H. Fortenberry
- Born: Miami, Florida, U.S.
- Occupation: Businessman
- Spouse: Anna Fortenberry (m. 1975)
- Children: 5

Kenneth Hale Fortenberry (born 1951) is an author, journalist, and former newspaper publisher residing in Georgia. He was the owner and publisher of news@norman, a weekly newspaper serving the Denver and the West Lake Norman area of North Carolina. He sought the Republican nomination for North Carolina's 10th congressional district in 2012, losing to incumbent Patrick McHenry in the primary. He ran for Governor of North Carolina as a Libertarian in the 2016 election, but withdrew in August 2015.

== Early life ==
Born in Miami, Florida, Fortenberry grew up in Spartanburg, South Carolina. His father was a Pan American World Airways pilot, and his mother was a housewife.

== Newspaper career ==
As a journalist, Fortenberry has won several awards. While serving as executive editor of the Winter Haven News Chief, the newspaper landed the coveted Sigma Delta Chi Bronze Medallion in Public Service for a series about teachers with past felonies and other criminal records who were working in the state of Florida. The investigative reports led to legislation requiring better screening for those being considered for hiring.

== Author ==
Fortenberry gained international recognition in 1987 when his house was rocked by two explosions because of stories he published in the McCormick (S.C.) Messenger. His coverage of corruption in local law enforcement led to a federal prison term for the sheriff, the bribery conviction of the sheriff's replacement, the exposure of the chief deputy as an ex-convict, and changes in state law enforcement certification.

Fortenberry was featured on the CBS News program 60 Minutes, the NBC Today show, and his story was reported in dozens of publications including Newsweek and The New York Times. A book he wrote about the experience, Kill the Messenger, was published in 1989 by Peachtree Publishers LTD of Atlanta and has been under option for a TV movie.

In "The Mystery of the Lost Clipper", an article co-written by Fortenberry and Dr. Gregg Herken, the authors offer evidence of possible causes of the 1957 fatal crash of Pan Am Flight 7, en route from San Francisco, California, to Honolulu, Hawaii. Fortenberry's father, William, was the second officer and navigator of this flight. The article was featured in the September 2004 issue of Air & Space magazine. Fortenberry and Herken authored a follow-up article, "What Happened to Pan Am Flight 7?", in the January 2017 edition of Air & Space.

His latest book, Flight 7 is Missing: The Search for My Father's Killer, is the result of his lifelong search for the probable cause of the 1957 Pan American plane crash that killed his father and 43 others aboard. It was published on May 19, 2020, by Fayetteville Mafia Press of New York City.

== Politics ==
Fortenberry ran against incumbent U.S. Representative Patrick McHenry in the Republican primary for North Carolina's 10th congressional district in 2012. McHenry defeated him by 58,844 votes (72.5%) to 15,936 (19.6%).
