= 2012 United States House of Representatives elections in North Carolina =

- November 6, 2012

All 13 North Carolina seats in the United States House of Representatives
	Majority party	Minority party
Party	Republican	Democratic
Last election	6	7
Seats won	9	4
Seat change	▲3	▼3
Popular vote	2,137,167	2,218,357
Percentage	48.75%	50.60%
Swing	▼5.38%	▲5.35%

Republican
40–50%
50–60%
60–70%
70–80%
Democratic
40–50%
50–60%
60–70%
70–80%

The 2012 United States House of Representatives elections in North Carolina were held on Tuesday, November 6, 2012, to elect the 13 U.S. representatives from the state of North Carolina. The elections coincided with the U.S. presidential election, N.C. gubernatorial election, statewide judicial elections, Council of State elections, and various local elections. Primary elections were held on May 8, 2012; for races in which no candidate received 40 percent of the vote in the primary, runoff elections (officially known as "second" primaries) were held on July 17.

North Carolina was one of five states in which the party that won the state's popular vote did not win a majority of seats in 2012, along with Arizona, Michigan, Pennsylvania, and Wisconsin.

== Overview ==
=== Statewide ===
Party	Candidates	Votes		Seats		
Party	Candidates	No.	%	No.	+/–	%
Republican	13	2,137,167	48.75	9	▲3	69.23
Democratic	13	2,218,357	50.60	4	▼3	30.77
Libertarian	3	24,142	0.55	0	Steady	0.00
Write-in	1	4,446	0.10	0	Steady	0.00
Total	30	4,384,112	100.0	13	Steady	100.0

Popular vote
Democratic	50.60%
Republican	48.75%
Libertarian	0.55%
Other	0.10%

House seats
Republican	69.23%
Democratic	30.77%
Libertarian	0.00%
Other	0.00%

=== By district ===
Results of the 2012 United States House of Representatives elections in North Carolina by district:

District	Democratic		Republican		Others		Total		Result
District	Votes	%	Votes	%	Votes	%	Votes	%	Result
District 1	254,644	75.32%	77,288	22.86%	6,134	1.81%	338,066	100.00%	Democratic hold
District 2	128,973	41.42%	174,066	55.90%	8,358	2.68%	311,397	100.00%	Republican hold
District 3	114,314	36.89%	195,571	63.11%	0	0.00%	309,885	100.00%	Republican hold
District 4	259,534	74.47%	88,951	25.53%	0	0.00%	348,485	100.00%	Democratic hold
District 5	148,252	42.46%	200,945	57.54%	0	0.00%	349,197	100.00%	Republican hold
District 6	142,467	39.08%	222,116	60.92%	0	0.00%	364,583	100.00%	Republican hold
District 7	168,695	50.10%	168,041	49.90%	0	0.00%	336,736	100.00%	Democratic hold
District 8	137,139	45.37%	160,695	53.16%	4,446	1.47%	302,280	100.00%	Republican gain
District 9	171,503	45.65%	194,537	51.78%	9,650	2.57%	375,690	100.00%	Republican hold
District 10	144,023	43.01%	190,826	56.99%	0	0.00%	334,849	100.00%	Republican hold
District 11	141,107	42.58%	190,319	57.42%	0	0.00%	331,426	100.00%	Republican gain
District 12	247,591	79.63%	63,317	20.37%	0	0.00%	310,908	100.00%	Democratic hold
District 13	160,115	43.20%	210,495	56.80%	'0	0.00%	370,610	100.00%	Republican gain
Total	2,218,357	50.60%	2,137,167	48.75%	28,588	0.65%	4,384,112	100.00%	

== Redistricting ==
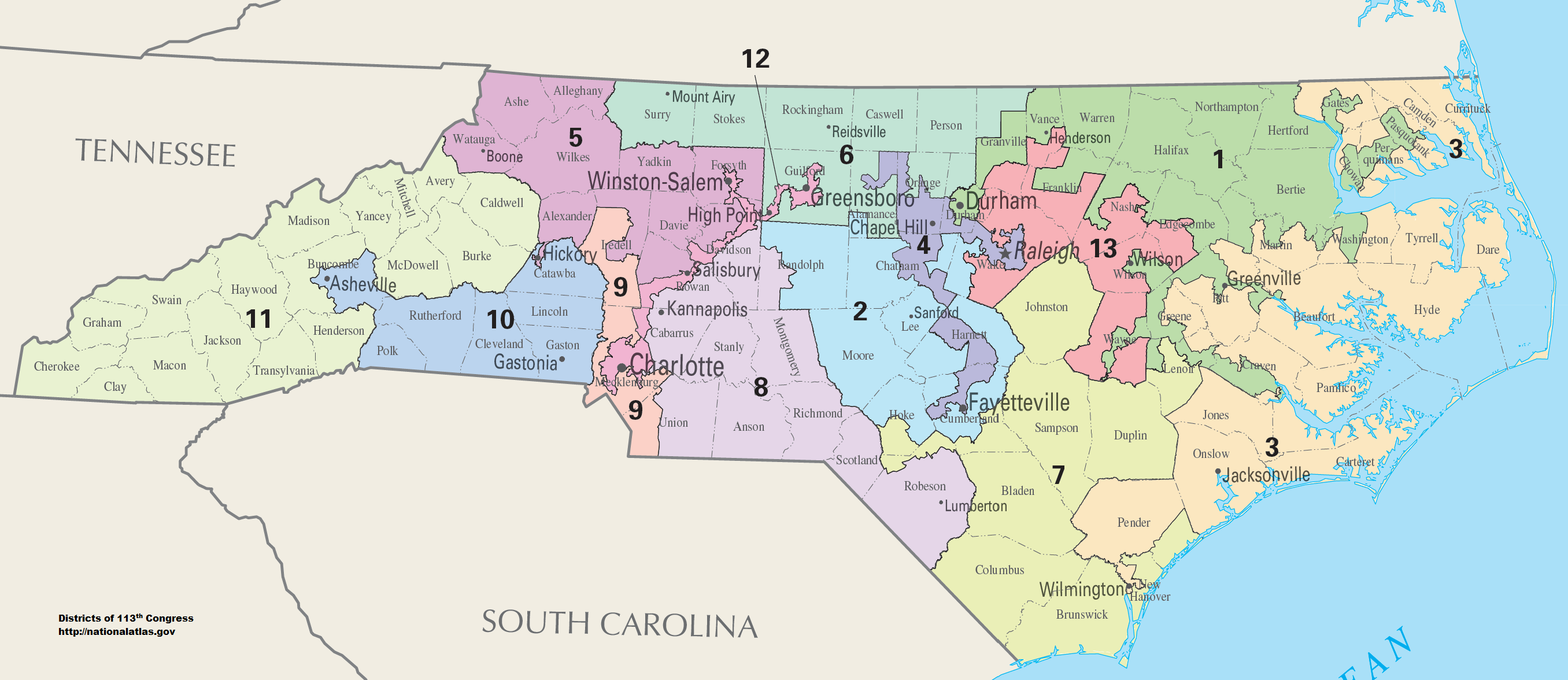
North Carolina's congressional districts after 2010 census redistricting

A redistricting map, drawn to reflect changes observed in the 2010 United States census, was passed into law in July 2011. The map must receive approval from either the U.S. District Court for the District of Columbia or the U.S. Department of Justice before it can be enforced (under the 1965 Voting Rights Act). The North Carolina chapter of the National Association for the Advancement of Colored People challenged the map on the grounds that it reduces the influence of African American voters.

District	Old PVI	New PVI	Incumbent
1st	D+9	D+17	G. K. Butterfield
2nd	R+2	R+11	Renee Ellmers
3rd	R+16	R+10	Walter B. Jones Jr.
4th	D+8	D+17	David Price
5th	R+15	R+12	Virginia Foxx
6th	R+18	R+11	Howard Coble
7th	R+5	R+11	Mike McIntyre
8th	R+2	R+12	Larry Kissell
9th	R+11	R+10	Sue Myrick
10th	R+17	R+11	Patrick McHenry
11th	R+6	R+12	Heath Shuler
12th	D+16	D+23	Mel Watt
13th	D+5	R+9	Brad Miller

== District 1 ==
2012 North Carolina's 1st congressional district election
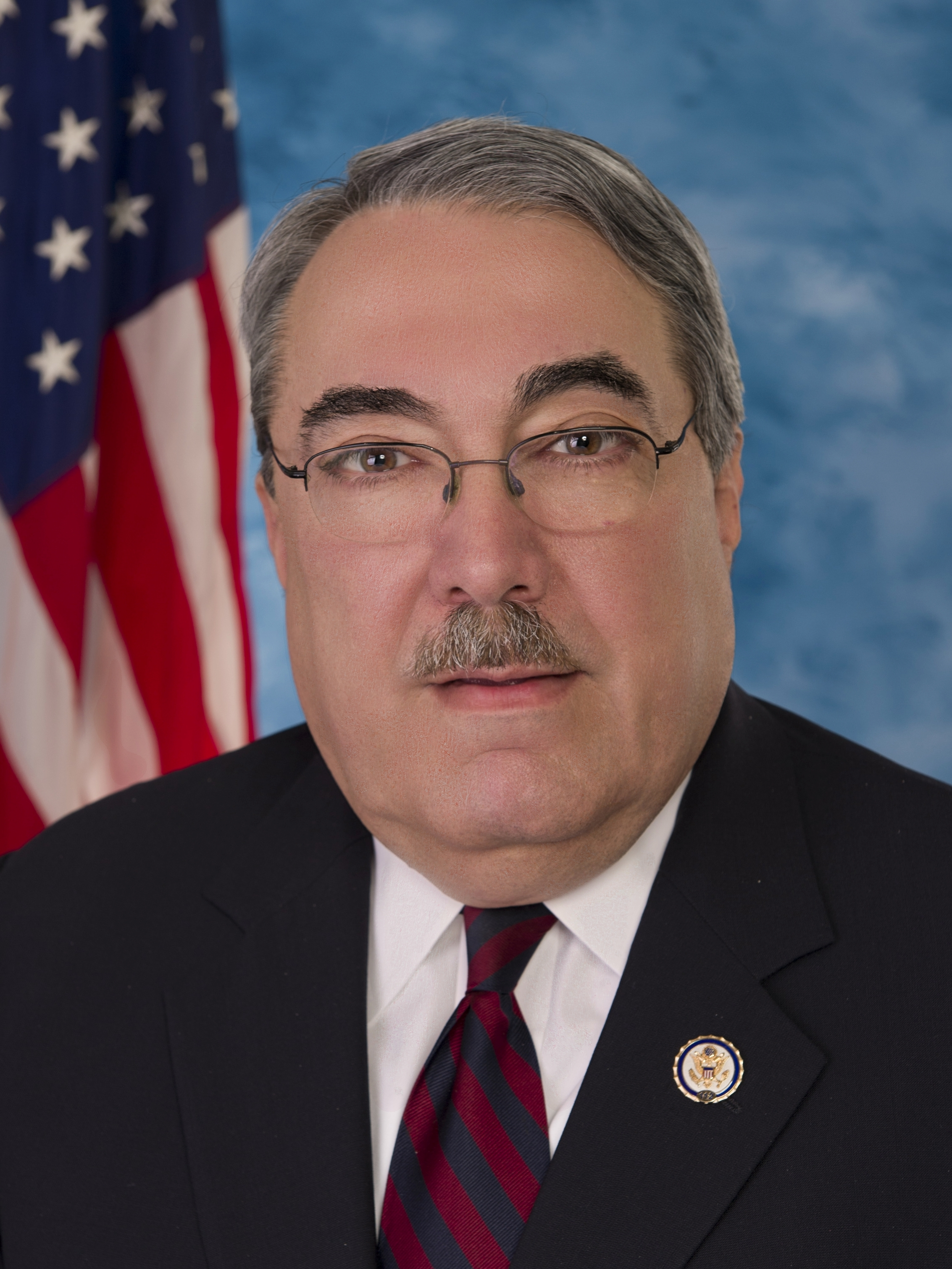

Nominee	G. K. Butterfield	Pete DiLauro
Party	Democratic	Republican
Popular vote	254,644	77,288
Percentage	75.3%	22.9%
- County results Butterfield: 50–60% 60–70% 70–80% 80–90%
U.S. Representative before election
G. K. Butterfield
Democratic
Elected U.S. Representative
G. K. Butterfield
Democratic

Incumbent Democrat G. K. Butterfield, who had represented the district since 2004, ran for re-election. The 1st district, which is majority-minority and already strongly favored Democrats, favored them even more so after redistricting. The redrawn district had a PVI of D+17, whereas the old 1st had a PVI of D+9.

=== Democratic primary ===
==== Candidates ====
===== Nominee =====
- G. K. Butterfield, incumbent U.S. representative

===== Eliminated in primary =====
- Daniel-Lynn Whittacre, high school teacher, HHS federal agent

==== Primary results ====
Democratic primary results
Party	Candidate	Votes	%
Democratic	G. K. Butterfield (incumbent)	89,531	81.1
Democratic	Daniel-Lynn Whittacre	20,822	18.9
Total votes		28,582	100.0

=== Republican primary ===
==== Candidates ====
===== Nominee =====
- Pete DiLauro, former law enforcement officer

=== General election ===
==== Endorsements ====
G. K. Butterfield (D)

Labor unions

- AFL-CIO
- International Brotherhood of Boilermakers
- National Association of Letter Carriers
- National Education Association
- North Carolina Association of Educators
- United Steelworkers

Organizations

- Humane Society of the United States
- Sierra Club

Newspapers

- Indy Week

==== Predictions ====
Source	Ranking	As of
The Cook Political Report	Safe D	November 5, 2012
Rothenberg	Safe D	November 2, 2012
Roll Call	Safe D	November 4, 2012
Sabato's Crystal Ball	Safe D	November 5, 2012
NY Times	Safe D	November 4, 2012
RCP	Safe D	November 4, 2012
The Hill	Safe D	November 4, 2012

==== Results ====
North Carolina's 1st congressional district, 2012
Party	Candidate	Votes	%
Democratic	G. K. Butterfield (incumbent)	254,644	75.3
Republican	Pete DiLauro	77,288	22.9
Libertarian	Darryl Holloman	6,134	1.8
Total votes		338,066	100.0
Democratic hold			

== District 2 ==
2012 North Carolina's 2nd congressional district election
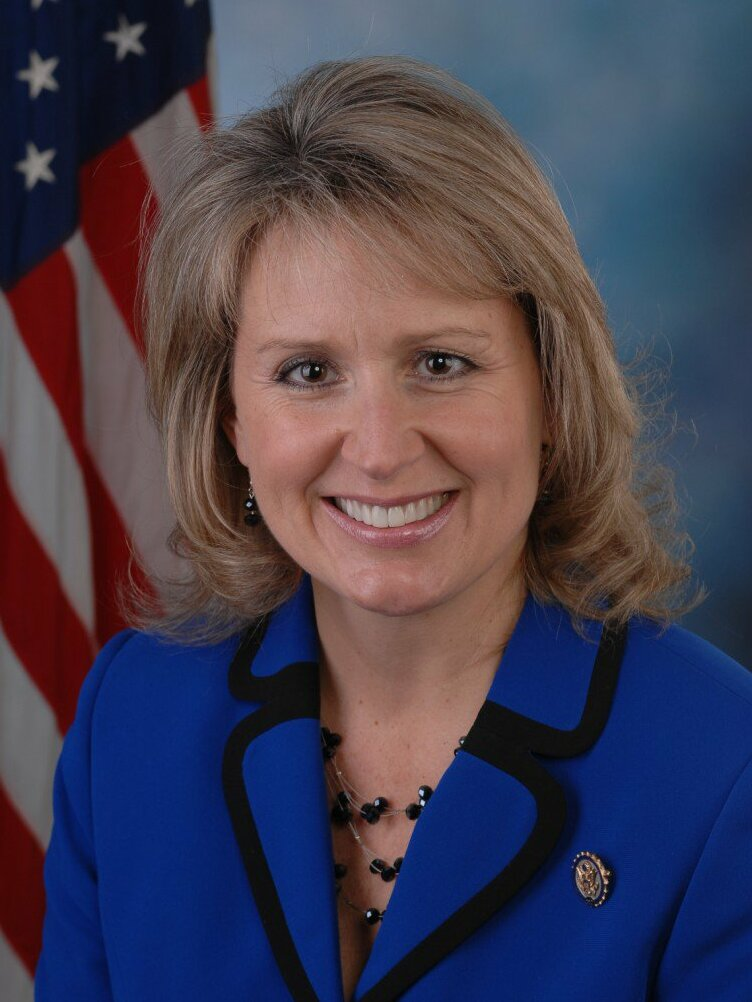

Nominee	Renee Ellmers	Steve Wilkins
Party	Republican	Democratic
Popular vote	174,066	128,973
Percentage	55.9%	41.4%
- County results Ellmers: 40–50% 50–60% 60–70% 70–80% Wilkins: 40–50% 50–60%
U.S. Representative before election
Renee Ellmers
Republican
Elected U.S. Representative
Renee Ellmers
Republican

Incumbent Republican Renee Ellmers, who had represented the district since 2011, ran for re-election. The 2nd district was made more favorable to Republicans in redistricting, with The Hill ranking Ellmers at second in its list of house members most helped by redistricting. The redrawn district had a PVI of R+11, whereas the old 2nd had a PVI of R+2.

=== Republican primary ===
==== Candidates ====
===== Nominee =====
- Renee Ellmers, incumbent U.S. representative

===== Eliminated in primary =====
- Sonya Holmes
- Clement F. Munno
- Richard Speer, contract farmer

==== Primary results ====
Republican primary results
Party	Candidate	Votes	%
Republican	Renee Ellmers (incumbent)	37,661	56.0
Republican	Richard Speer	20,099	29.9
Republican	Sonya Holmes	6,535	9.7
Republican	Clement F. Munno	2,982	4.4
Total votes		67,277	100.0

=== Democratic primary ===
==== Candidates ====
===== Nominee =====
- Steve Wilkins, retired U.S. Army officer and businessman

===== Eliminated in primary =====
- Toni Morris, professional counselor

===== Withdrawn =====
- Jim Bibbs

===== Declined =====
- Bob Etheridge, former U.S. representative (ran for governor)

==== Primary results ====
Democratic primary results
Party	Candidate	Votes	%
Democratic	Steve Wilkins	24,327	50.7
Democratic	Toni Morris	20,431	42.6
Democratic	Jim Bibbs (Withdrawn)	3,238	6.7
Total votes		47,996	100.0

=== Libertarian primary ===
==== Candidates ====
===== Nominee =====
- Brian Irving, retired U.S. Air Force officer

=== General election ===
==== Endorsements ====
Renee Ellmers (R)

Organizations

- Campaign for Working Families
- GOProud
- Maggie's List
- National Right to Life Committee
- NRA Political Victory Fund
- Susan B. Anthony List
- United States Chamber of Commerce
Steve Wilkins (D)

Labor unions

- AFL-CIO
- United Steelworkers

Newspapers

- Indy Week
Did not endorse

Newspapers

- Raleigh News & Observer

==== Predictions ====
Source	Ranking	As of
The Cook Political Report	Safe R	November 5, 2012
Rothenberg	Safe R	November 2, 2012
Roll Call	Safe R	November 4, 2012
Sabato's Crystal Ball	Safe R	November 5, 2012
NY Times	Safe R	November 4, 2012
RCP	Safe R	November 4, 2012
The Hill	Safe R	November 4, 2012

==== Results ====
North Carolina's 2nd congressional district, 2012
Party	Candidate	Votes	%
Republican	Renee Ellmers (incumbent)	174,066	55.9
Democratic	Steve Wilkins	128,973	41.4
Libertarian	Brian Irving	8,358	2.7
Total votes		311,397	100.0
Republican hold			

== District 3 ==
2012 North Carolina's 3rd congressional district election
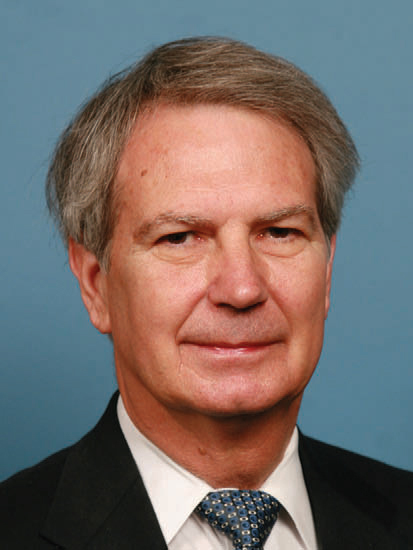

Nominee	Walter B. Jones Jr.	Erik Anderson
Party	Republican	Democratic
Popular vote	195,571	114,314
Percentage	63.1%	36.9%
- County results Jones: 50–60% 60–70% 70–80% Anderson: 70–80%
U.S. Representative before election
Walter B. Jones Jr.
Republican
Elected U.S. Representative
Walter B. Jones Jr.
Republican

Incumbent Republican Walter B. Jones Jr., who had represented the district since 1995, ran for re-election. The 3rd district was made slightly more favorable to Democrats in redistricting, but continued to strongly favor Republicans. The redrawn district had a PVI of R+10, whereas the old 3rd had a PVI of R+16.

=== Republican primary ===
==== Candidates ====
===== Nominee =====
- Walter B. Jones Jr., incumbent U.S. representative

===== Eliminated in primary =====
- Frank Palombo, former New Bern police chief

==== Primary results ====
Republican primary results
Party	Candidate	Votes	%
Republican	Walter B. Jones (incumbent)	42,644	69.0
Republican	Frank Palombo	19,166	31.0
Total votes		61,810	100.0

=== Democratic primary ===
==== Candidates ====
===== Nominee =====
- Erik Anderson, former U.S. Marine

=== General election ===
==== Endorsements ====
Walter B. Jones (R)

Labor unions

- National Association of Letter Carriers

Organizations

- Humane Society of the United States
- National Right to Life Committee
- NRA Political Victory Fund
- United States Chamber of Commerce

==== Predictions ====
Source	Ranking	As of
The Cook Political Report	Safe R	November 5, 2012
Rothenberg	Safe R	November 2, 2012
Roll Call	Safe R	November 4, 2012
Sabato's Crystal Ball	Safe R	November 5, 2012
NY Times	Safe R	November 4, 2012
RCP	Safe R	November 4, 2012
The Hill	Safe R	November 4, 2012

==== Results ====
North Carolina's 3rd congressional district, 2012
Party	Candidate	Votes	%
Republican	Walter B. Jones Jr. (incumbent)	195,571	63.1
Democratic	Erik Anderson	114,314	36.9
Total votes		309,885	100.0
Republican hold			

== District 4 ==
2012 North Carolina's 4th congressional district election
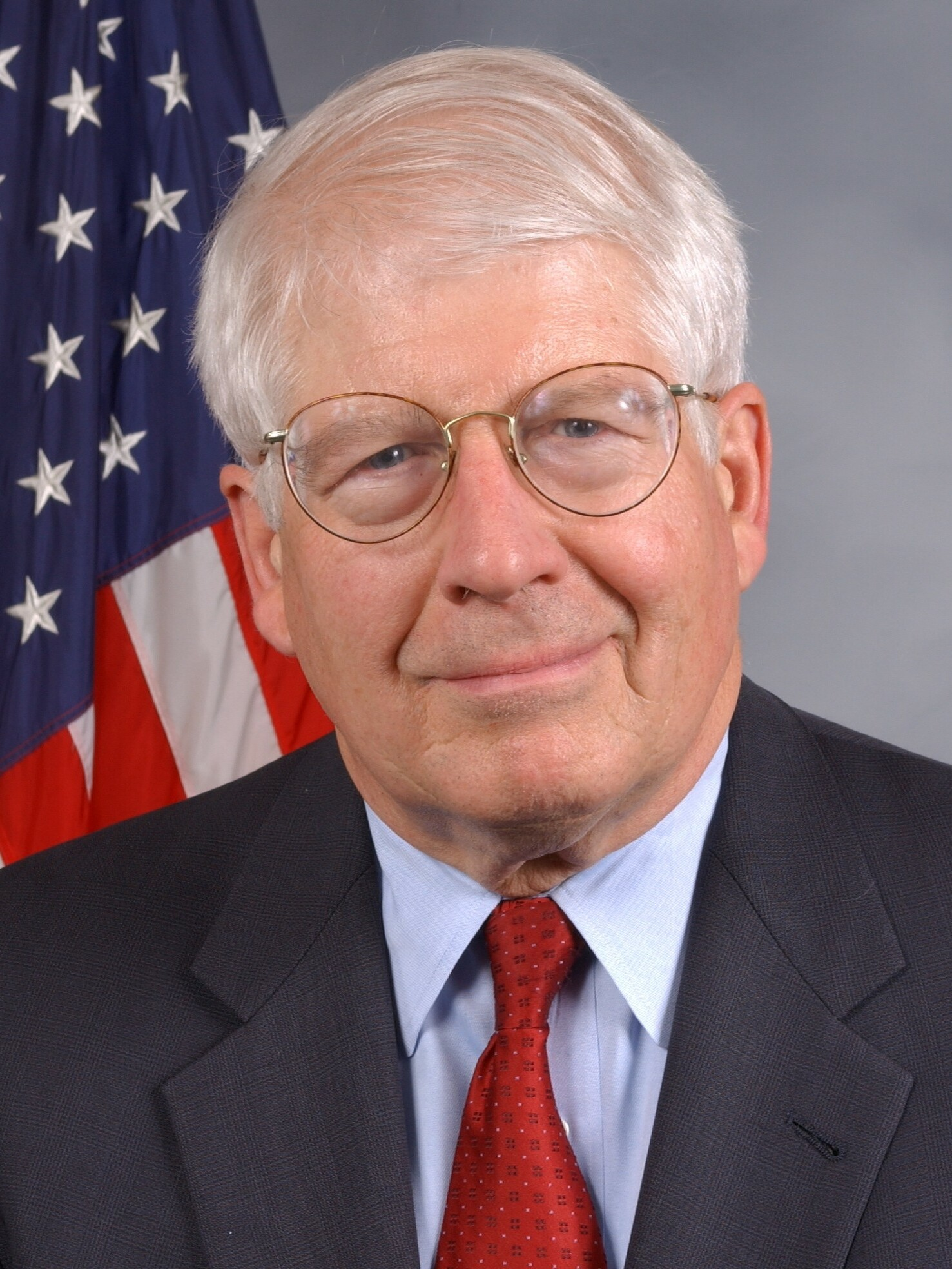

Nominee	David Price	Tim D'Annunzio
Party	Democratic	Republican
Popular vote	259,534	88,951
Percentage	74.5%	25.5%
- County results Price: 60–70% 70–80%
U.S. Representative before election
David Price
Democratic
Elected U.S. Representative
David Price
Democratic

Democrat David Price, who had represented North Carolina's 4th congressional district since 1997 and previously served from 1987 until 1995, ran for re-election. Brad Miller, who had represented the 13th district since 2003, considered challenging Price in the 4th district primary after having his home drawn into it, but announced in January 2012 that he would not seek either seat and would instead retire.

=== Democratic primary ===
Price was unopposed in the Democratic primary.

==== Candidates ====
===== Nominee =====
- David Price, incumbent U.S. representative

===== Declined =====
- Brad Miller, incumbent U.S. representative for North Carolina's 13th congressional district

=== Republican primary ===
==== Candidates ====
===== Nominee =====
- Tim D'Annunzio, businessman and candidate for North Carolina's 8th congressional district in 2010.

===== Eliminated in primary =====
- Jim Allen, electrical contractor
- George Hutchins, former US Marine, veteran of the first Gulf War and candidate for this district in 2010

===== Withdrawn =====
- Doug Yopp, director of the Friends of the Library at NC State

==== Primary results ====
Republican primary results
Party	Candidate	Votes	%
Republican	Tim D'Annunzio	14,065	46.4
Republican	Jim Allen	10,430	34.4
Republican	George Frank Hutchins	5,811	19.2
Total votes		30,306	100.0

=== General election ===
==== Endorsements ====
David Price (D)

Labor unions

- AFL-CIO
- National Association of Letter Carriers
- National Education Association
- North Carolina Association of Educators
- United Steelworkers

Organizations

- Human Rights Campaign
- Humane Society of the United States
- Planned Parenthood Action Fund
- Sierra Club

Newspapers

- Indy Week
- Raleigh News & Observer

==== Predictions ====
Source	Ranking	As of
The Cook Political Report	Safe D	November 5, 2012
Rothenberg	Safe D	November 2, 2012
Roll Call	Safe D	November 4, 2012
Sabato's Crystal Ball	Safe D	November 5, 2012
NY Times	Safe D	November 4, 2012
RCP	Safe D	November 4, 2012
The Hill	Safe D	November 4, 2012

==== Results ====
North Carolina's 4th congressional district, 2012
Party	Candidate	Votes	%
Democratic	David Price (incumbent)	259,534	74.5
Republican	Tim D'Annunzio	88,951	25.5
Total votes		348,485	100.0
Democratic hold			

== District 5 ==
2012 North Carolina's 5th congressional district election
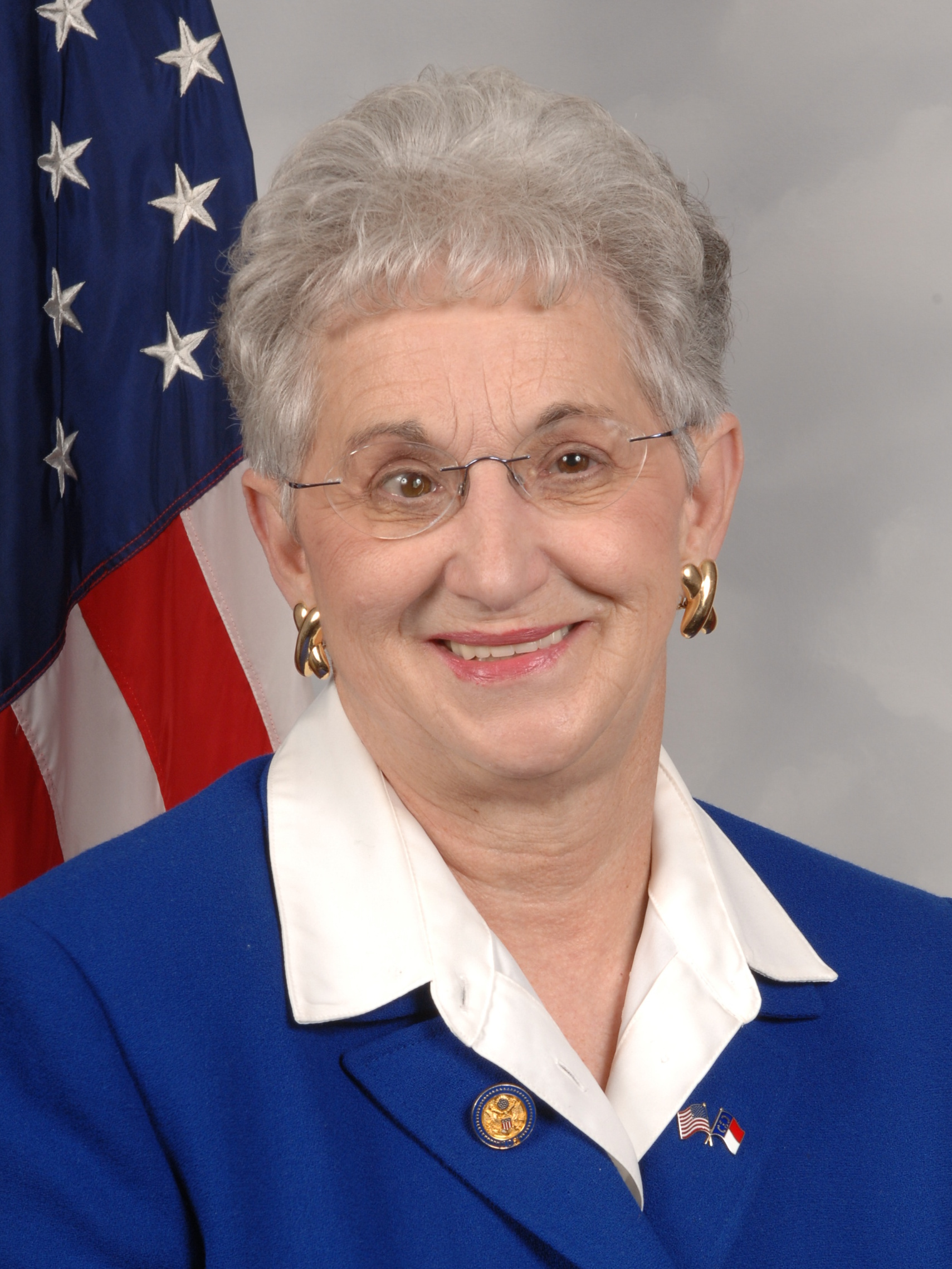

Nominee	Virginia Foxx	Elisabeth Motsinger
Party	Republican	Democratic
Popular vote	200,945	148,252
Percentage	57.5%	42.5%
- County results Foxx: 50–60% 60–70% 70–80% Motsinger: 50–60%
U.S. Representative before election
Virginia Foxx
Republican
Elected U.S. Representative
Virginia Foxx
Republican

Republican Virginia Foxx, who had represented North Carolina's 5th congressional district since 2005, ran for re-election. The 5th district was made slightly more favorable to Democrats in redistricting, but continued to strongly favor Republicans.

=== Republican primary ===
==== Candidates ====
===== Nominee =====
- Virginia Foxx, incumbent U.S. representative

=== Democratic primary ===
==== Candidates ====
===== Nominee =====
- Elisabeth Motsinger, Winston-Salem/Forsyth County School Board member

===== Eliminated in primary =====
- Bruce Peller, dentist

===== Withdrawn =====
- Treva Johnson, Wilkes County Democratic chairwoman

==== Primary results ====
Democratic primary results
Party	Candidate	Votes	%
Democratic	Elisabeth Motsinger	38,512	69.7
Democratic	Bruce G. Peller	16,716	30.3
Total votes		55,228	100.0

=== General election ===
==== Endorsements ====
Virginia Foxx (R)

Organizations

- Campaign for Working Families
- Maggie's List
- National Right to Life Committee
- NRA Political Victory Fund
- Susan B. Anthony List
- United States Chamber of Commerce
Elisabeth Motsinger (D)

Labor unions

- AFL-CIO
- National Education Association

==== Predictions ====
Source	Ranking	As of
The Cook Political Report	Safe R	November 5, 2012
Rothenberg	Safe R	November 2, 2012
Roll Call	Safe R	November 4, 2012
Sabato's Crystal Ball	Safe R	November 5, 2012
NY Times	Safe R	November 4, 2012
RCP	Safe R	November 4, 2012
The Hill	Safe R	November 4, 2012

==== Results ====
North Carolina's 5th congressional district, 2012
Party	Candidate	Votes	%
Republican	Virginia Foxx (incumbent)	200,945	57.5
Democratic	Elisabeth Motsinger	148,252	42.5
Total votes		349,197	100.0
Republican hold			

== District 6 ==
2012 North Carolina's 6th congressional district election
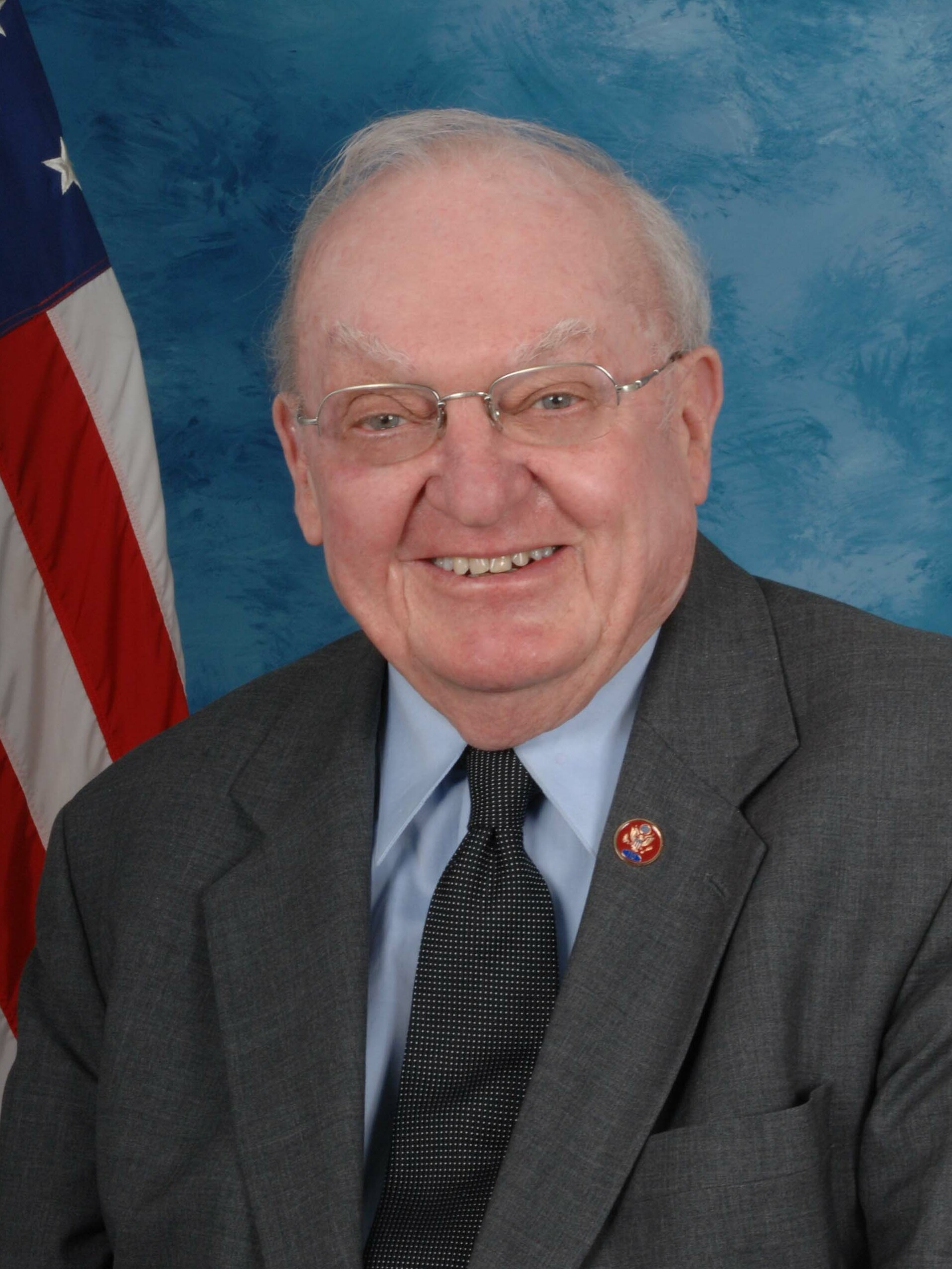

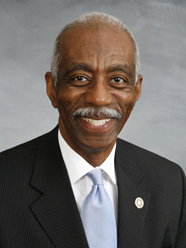
Nominee	Howard Coble	Anthony Foriest
Party	Republican	Democratic
Popular vote	222,116	142,467
Percentage	60.9%	39.1%
- County results Coble: 50–60% 60–70% 70–80% Foriest: 50–60%
U.S. Representative before election
Howard Coble
Republican
Elected U.S. Representative
Howard Coble
Republican

Republican Howard Coble, who had represented North Carolina's 6th congressional district since 1985, ran for re-election. The 6th district was expected to continue to strongly favor Republicans.

=== Republican primary ===
==== Candidates ====
===== Nominee =====
- Howard Coble, incumbent U.S. representative

===== Eliminated in primary =====
- Bill Flynn, former radio personality
- Billy Yow, Guilford County commissioner

==== Primary results ====
Republican primary results
Party	Candidate	Votes	%
Republican	Howard Coble (incumbent)	50,701	57.3
Republican	Bill Flynn	19,741	22.3
Republican	Billy Yow	18,057	20.4
Total votes		88,499	100.0

=== Democratic primary ===
==== Candidates ====
===== Nominee =====
- Tony Foriest, former state senator from the 24th district

=== General election ===
==== Endorsements ====
Howard Coble (R)

Organizations

- National Right to Life Committee
- NRA Political Victory Fund
- United States Chamber of Commerce

Newspapers

- Greensboro News and Record
Tony Foriest (D)

Newspapers

- Indy Week

==== Predictions ====
Source	Ranking	As of
The Cook Political Report	Safe R	November 5, 2012
Rothenberg	Safe R	November 2, 2012
Roll Call	Safe R	November 4, 2012
Sabato's Crystal Ball	Safe R	November 5, 2012
NY Times	Safe R	November 4, 2012
RCP	Safe R	November 4, 2012
The Hill	Safe R	November 4, 2012

==== Results ====
North Carolina's 6th congressional district, 2012
Party	Candidate	Votes	%
Republican	Howard Coble (incumbent)	222,116	60.9
Democratic	Anthony Foriest	142,467	39.1
Total votes		364,583	100.0
Republican hold			

== District 7 ==
2012 North Carolina's 7th congressional district election
- November 6, 2012
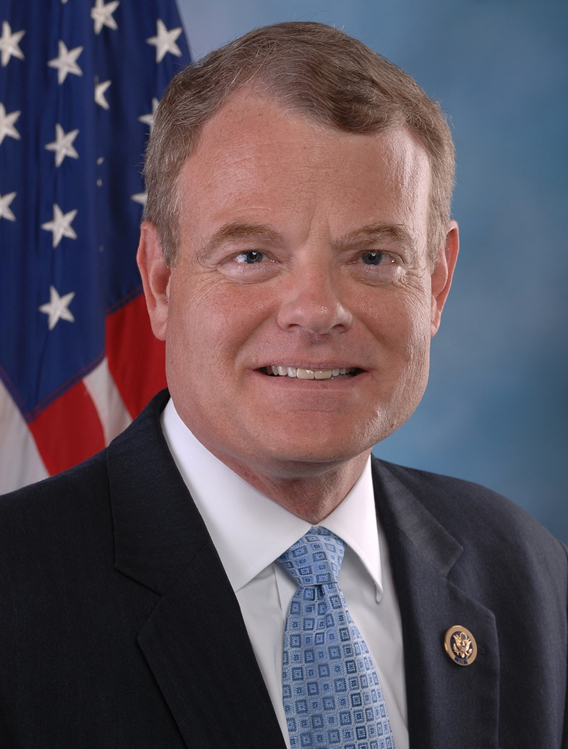

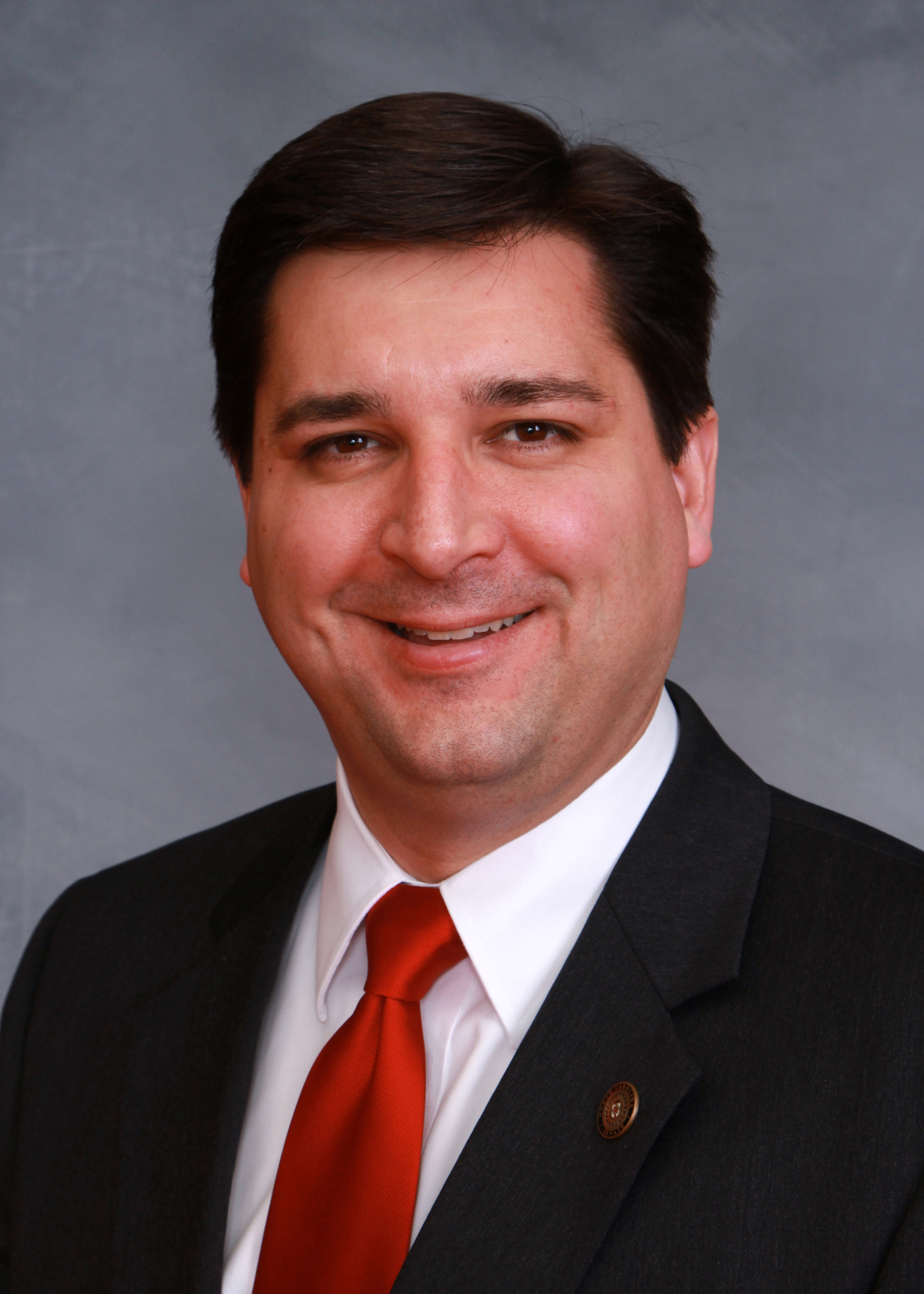
Nominee	Mike McIntyre	David Rouzer
Party	Democratic	Republican
Popular vote	168,695	168,041
Percentage	50.1%	49.9%
- County results Mcintyre: 50–60% 60–70% 70–80% Rouzer: 50–60% 60–70%
U.S. Representative before election
Mike McIntyre
Democratic
Elected U.S. Representative
Mike McIntyre
Democratic

The home of Democrat Mike McIntyre, who had represented North Carolina's 7th congressional district since 1997, was drawn into the 8th district in redistricting. McIntyre, who had briefly considered running for governor following Bev Perdue's announcement that she would not seek re-election, decided to seek re-election in the newly redrawn 7th district. The district was made more favorable to Republicans in redistricting: 58% of its residents voted for Republican nominee John McCain in the 2008 presidential election.

=== Democratic primary ===
==== Candidates ====
===== Nominee =====
- Mike McIntyre, incumbent U.S. representative

=== Republican primary ===
==== Candidates ====
===== Nominee =====
- David Rouzer, state senator from the 12th district

===== Eliminated in primary =====
- Randy Crow, business executive
- Ilario Pantano, retired U.S. Marine and nominee for this district in 2010

===== Withdrawn =====
- Timothy Alan Wilkes

==== Primary results ====
Republican primary results
Party	Candidate	Votes	%
Republican	David Rouzer	34,647	48.5
Republican	Ilario Gregory Pantano	31,752	44.5
Republican	Randy Crow	5,012	7.0
Total votes		71,411	100.0

=== General election ===
==== Campaign ====
McIntyre was heavily targeted by Republicans, especially after the GOP-controlled North Carolina General Assembly had redrawn congressional boundaries to put his home in Robeson County into the 8th district, something that McIntyre accused the GOP of doing “solely for the reason of giving my opponent a seat in Congress”.

Nearly $9 million was spent by both parties, with McIntyre airing ads stating he was a "strong conservative and Christian who walks his faith every day" and Rouzer trying to tie McIntyre to his votes for Nancy Pelosi and for the stimulus.

==== Endorsements ====
Mike McIntyre (D)

Labor unions

- AFL-CIO
- International Brotherhood of Boilermakers
- National Association of Letter Carriers
- National Education Association
- North Carolina Association of Educators
- United Steelworkers

Organizations

- Blue Dog Coalition
- Democratic Congressional Campaign Committee "Frontline" Program
- National Federation of Independent Business
- National Right to Life Committee
- NRA Political Victory Fund
- United States Chamber of Commerce

Newspapers

- The Robesonian
- Star-News
- Tabor-Loris Tribune
- Wilmington Journal
- Wilmington Morning Star
David Rouzer (R)

U.S. senators

- Lauch Faircloth, former U.S. senator (1993–1999)

U.S. representatives

- Renee Ellmers, U.S. representative from North Carolina's 2nd congressional district (2011–present)
- Patrick McHenry, U.S. representative from North Carolina's 10th congressional district (2005–present)

Statewide officials

- Steve Troxler, North Carolina Commissioner of Agriculture (2005–present)

State legislators

- Phil Berger, president pro tempore of the North Carolina Senate (2011–present)
- Thom Goolsby, state senator from the 9th district (2011–present)
- W. Brent Jackson, state senator from the 10th district (2011–present)
- Bill Rabon, state senator from the 8th district (2011–present)
- Thom Tillis, Speaker of the North Carolina House of Representatives (2011–present)

Organizations

- National Republican Congressional Committee "Young Guns" Program
- Tea Party Express

Local officials

- Pat McCrory, mayor of Charlotte (1995–2009) and nominee for Governor in 2008 & 2012.

Individuals

- Dorothy Helms, widow of U.S. Senator Jesse Helms

McIntyre was the lone Democratic federal candidate endorsed by National Right to Life Committee in this election cycle.

==== Polling ====
Poll source	Date(s) administered	Sample size	Margin of error	Mike McIntyre (D)	David Rouzer (R)	Undecided
Wenzel Strategies	October 23–24, 2012	600	± 3.98%	39%	45%	17%
North Star Opinion Research (R-YG Action)	August 12–13, 2012	400	± 4.9%	49%	40%	11%
Grove Insight	July 26–29, 2012	400	± 4.9%	52%	34%	13%
Public Opinion Strategies Rouzer (R)	July 22–23, 2012	400	± 4.9%	44%	40%	15%

==== Predictions ====
Source	Ranking	As of
The Cook Political Report	Tossup	November 5, 2012
Rothenberg	Tossup	November 2, 2012
Roll Call	Tossup	November 4, 2012
Sabato's Crystal Ball	Lean R (flip)	November 5, 2012
NY Times	Lean D	November 4, 2012
RCP	Tossup	November 4, 2012
The Hill	Tossup	November 4, 2012

==== Results ====
The election outcome left McIntyre the winner by 655 votes. A recount requested by Rouzer began on November 26, 2012; two days later, Rouzer conceded the race to McIntyre. This was the closest House race in 2012.

North Carolina's 7th congressional district, 2012
Party	Candidate	Votes	%
Democratic	Mike McIntyre (incumbent)	168,695	50.1
Republican	David Rouzer	168,041	49.9
Total votes		336,736	100.0
Democratic hold			

== District 8 ==
2012 North Carolina's 8th congressional district election
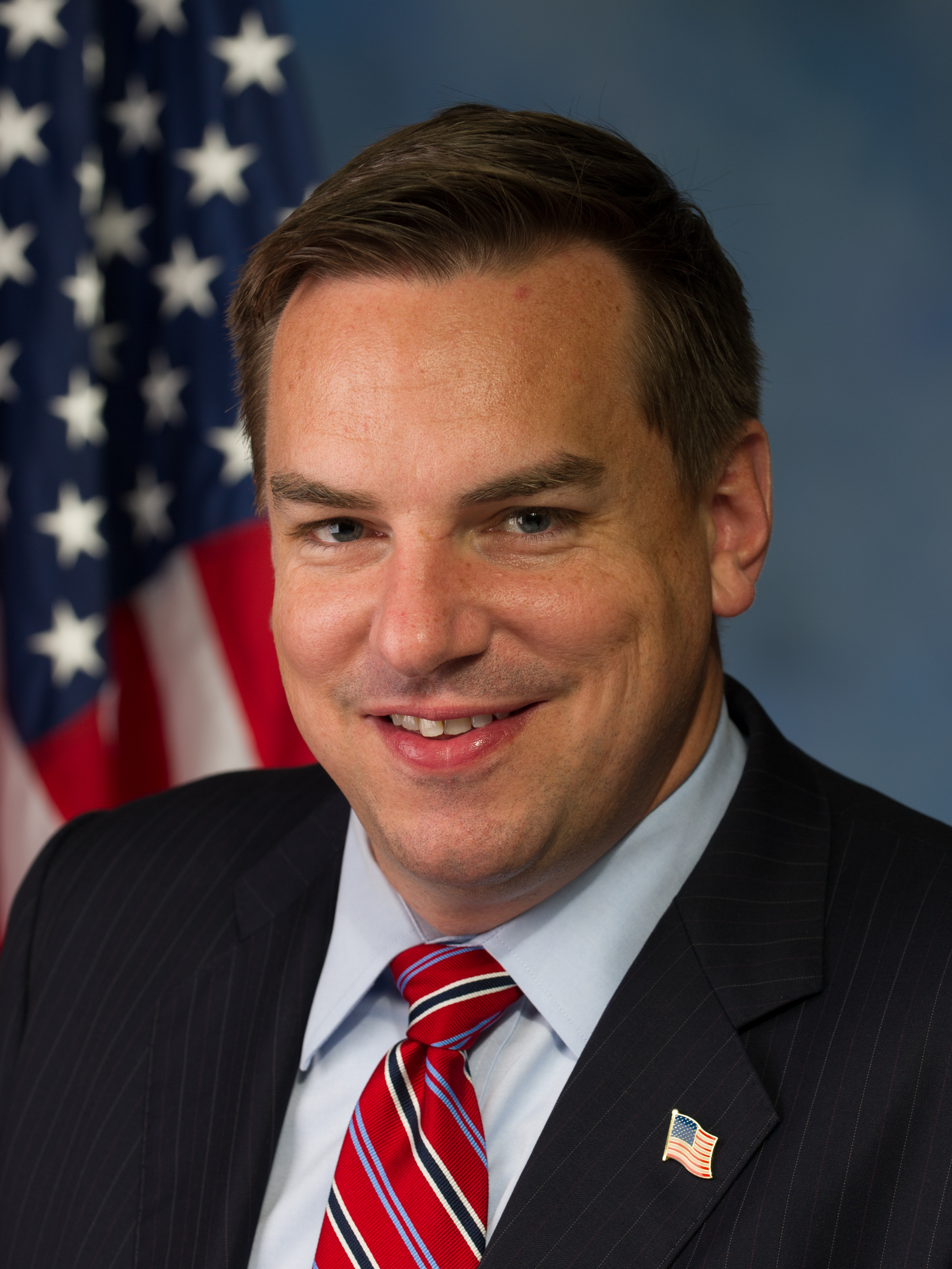

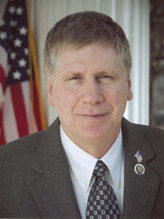
Nominee	Richard Hudson	Larry Kissell
Party	Republican	Democratic
Popular vote	160,695	137,139
Percentage	53.2%	45.4%
- County results Hudson: 50–60% 60–70% 70–80% Kissell: 50–60% 60–70%
U.S. Representative before election
Larry Kissell
Democratic
Elected U.S. Representative
Richard Hudson
Republican

Democrat Larry Kissell, who had represented North Carolina's 8th congressional district since 2009, ran for re-election. The home of Kissell's fellow Democrat Mike McIntyre, who had represented the 7th district since 1997, was drawn into the 8th district in redistricting, but McIntyre sought re-election in the 7th district. The 8th district was made more favorable to Republicans in redistricting: only 42% of its residents voted for Democratic nominee Barack Obama in the 2008 presidential election.

=== Democratic primary ===
==== Candidates ====
===== Nominee =====
- Larry Kissell, incumbent U.S. representative

===== Eliminated in primary =====
- Marcus Williams, attorney and candidate for U.S. Senate in 2008

==== Primary results ====
Democratic primary results
Party	Candidate	Votes	%
Democratic	Larry Kissell (incumbent)	45,987	72.6
Democratic	Marcus Williams	17,393	27.4
Total votes		63,380	100.0

=== Republican primary ===
==== Candidates ====
===== Nominee =====
- Richard Hudson, former U.S. Representative Robin Hayes' district director

===== Eliminated in primary =====
- Scott Keadle, former Iredell County commissioner
- Vernon Robinson, former Winston-Salem city council member and nominee for the 13th district in 2006
- Fred Steen, state representative
- John Whitley, neurosurgeon

===== Withdrawn =====
- Daniel Barry, insurance executive

===== Declined =====
- Justin Burr, state representative
- Jerry Dockham, state representative
- Pat Molamphy, businessman
- Harold Johnson, sportscaster and candidate for this district in 2010

==== Endorsements ====
Scott Keadle (R)

Organizations

- Club for Growth

==== Primary results ====
Republican primary results
Party	Candidate	Votes	%
Republican	Richard Hudson	21,451	32.1
Republican	Scott Keadle	14,687	22.0
Republican	Vernon Robinson	12,181	18.2
Republican	Fred F. Steen II	9,670	14.4
Republican	John M. Whitley	8,894	13.3
Total votes		67,277	100.0

==== Runoff results ====
Republican primary runoff results
Party	Candidate	Votes	%
Republican	Richard Hudson	10,699	63.6
Republican	Scott Keadle	6,118	36.4
Total votes		16,817	100.0

=== General election ===
==== Endorsements ====
Larry Kissell (D)

Labor unions

- AFL-CIO
- International Association of Fire Fighters
- International Brotherhood of Boilermakers
- National Association of Letter Carriers
- National Education Association
- North Carolina Association of Educators
- United Steelworkers

Organizations

- Alliance for Retired Americans
- Blue Dog Coalition
- Democratic Congressional Campaign Committee "Frontline" Program
- NRA Political Victory Fund
Richard Hudson (R)

U.S. senators

- Lauch Faircloth, former U.S. senator (1993–1999)
- Rick Santorum, former U.S. senator from Pennsylvania (1993–2007) and candidate for president in 2012

U.S. representatives

- Mike Conaway, U.S. representative from Texas's 11th congressional district (2005–present)
- Virginia Foxx, U.S. representative from North Carolina's 5th congressional district (2005–present)
- Paul Ryan, U.S. representative from Wisconsin's 1st congressional district (1999–present)

Statewide officials

- Mike Huckabee, former governor of Arkansas (1996–2007) and candidate for president in 2008
- James G. Martin, former governor of North Carolina (1985–1993)

State legislators

- Fred Steen, state representative (2004–present)

Organizations

- Campaign for Working Families
- Gun Owners of America
- Huck PAC
- National Association of Realtors
- National Federation of Independent Business
- National Republican Congressional Committee "Young Guns" Program
- National Right to Life Committee
- Tea Party Express
- United States Chamber of Commerce

Newspapers

- The Charlotte Observer

Local officials

- Pat McCrory, mayor of Charlotte (1995–2009) and nominee for governor in 2008 & 2012

Individuals

- Dorothy Helms, widow of U.S. Senator Jesse Helms

==== Polling ====
Poll source	Date(s) administered	Sample size	Margin of error	Larry Kissell (D)	Richard Hudson (R)	Undecided
Anzalone Liszt Research Kissell (D)	September 25–27, 2012	400	±4.9%	40%	39%	21%
NRCC	September 25, 2012	784	±3.5%	41%	50%	9%
Anzalone Liszt Research Kissell (D)	August 6–9, 2012	500	±4.4%	43%	39%	18%
Anzalone Liszt Research Kissell (D)	March 15–20, 2012	500	±4.4%	46%	36%	18%

==== Debates ====
- Complete video of debate, September 24, 2012

==== Predictions ====
Source	Ranking	As of
The Cook Political Report	Likely R (flip)	November 5, 2012
Rothenberg	Likely R (flip)	November 2, 2012
Roll Call	Likely R (flip)	November 4, 2012
Sabato's Crystal Ball	Likely R (flip)	November 5, 2012
NY Times	Tossup	November 4, 2012
RCP	Likely R (flip)	November 4, 2012
The Hill	Likely R (flip)	November 4, 2012

==== Result ====
North Carolina's 8th congressional district, 2012
Party	Candidate	Votes	%
Republican	Richard Hudson	160,695	53.2
Democratic	Larry Kissell (incumbent)	137,139	45.4
Independent	Antonio Blue (write-in)	3,990	1.3
Write-in		456	0.1
Total votes		302,280	100.0
Republican gain from Democratic			

== District 9 ==
2012 North Carolina's 9th congressional district election
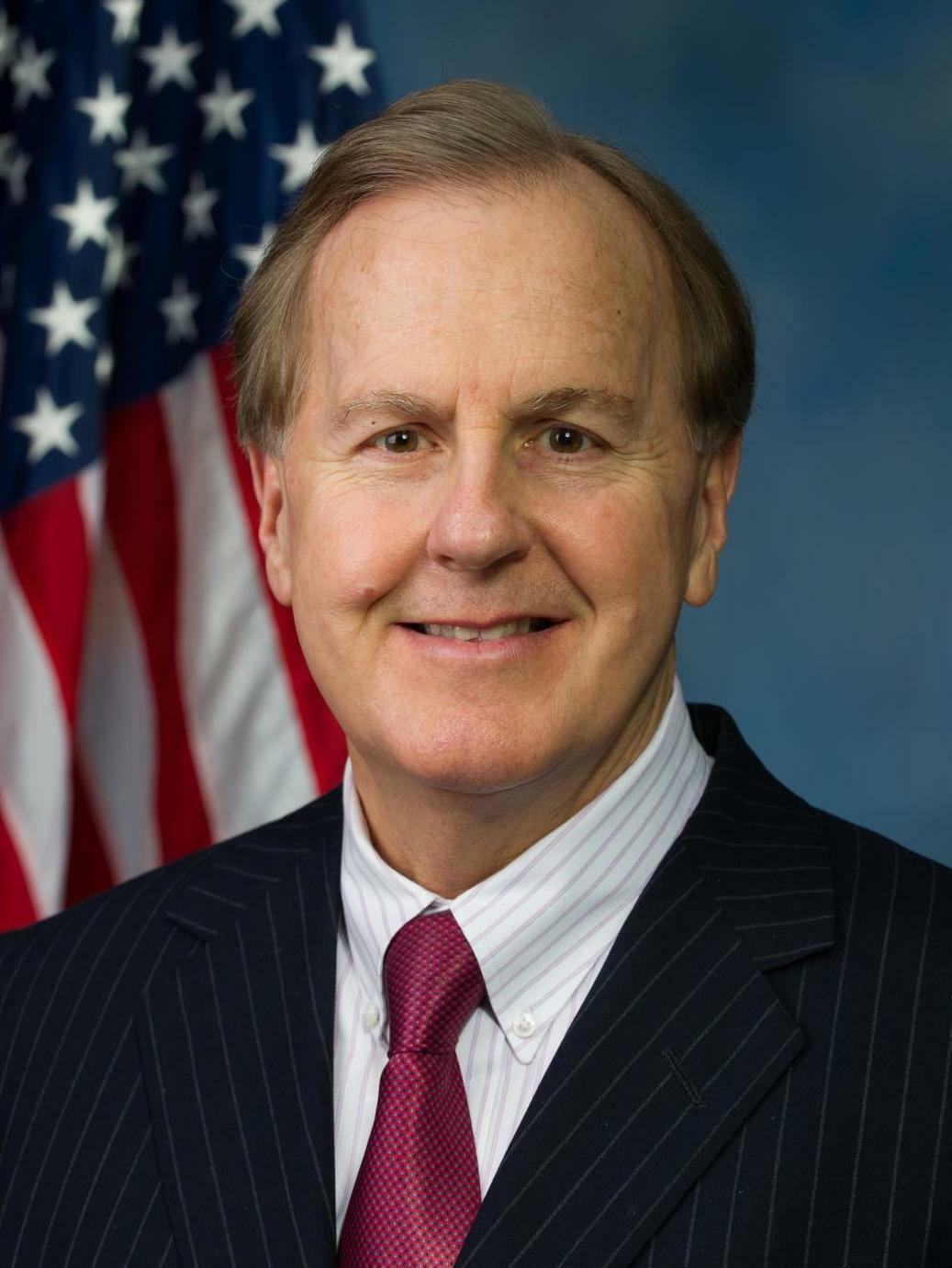

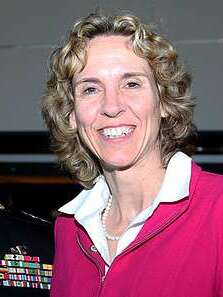
Nominee	Robert Pittenger	Jennifer Roberts
Party	Republican	Democratic
Popular vote	194,537	171,503
Percentage	51.8%	45.7%
- County results Pittenger: 60–70% Roberts: 50–60%
U.S. Representative before election
Sue Myrick
Republican
Elected U.S. Representative
Robert Pittenger
Republican

Republican Sue Myrick, who had represented North Carolina's 9th congressional district since 1995, did not seek another term. Curtis Campbell ran as the Libertarian nominee.

=== Republican primary ===
==== Candidates ====
===== Nominee =====
- Robert Pittenger, former state senator from the 39th district and nominee for lieutenant governor in 2008

===== Eliminated in primary =====
- Dan Barry, mayor pro tem of Weddington
- Andy Dulin, member of Charlotte City Council
- Jon Gauthier, financial adviser
- Ric Killian, former state representative
- Ken Leonwyzk, lawyer and ordained minister
- Richard Lynch, business owner
- Edwin Peacock, member of Charlotte City Council
- Jim Pendergraph, Mecklenburg County commissioner
- Michael Steinberg, businessman

===== Withdrawn =====
- Michael Schaffer, real estate broker (endorsed Barry)

===== Declined =====
- Sue Myrick, incumbent U.S. representative
- Bob Rucho, state senator from the 39th district

In the Republican primary, Pittenger and Pendergraph qualified for the runoff election, earning 33% and 25% of the vote, respectively. On July 17, Pittenger won the primary runoff.

==== Primary results ====
Republican primary results
Party	Candidate	Votes	%
Republican	Robert Pittenger	29,999	32.4
Republican	Jim Pendergraph	23,401	25.3
Republican	Edwin B. Peacock III	11,336	12.3
Republican	Ric Killian	9,691	10.5
Republican	Dan Barry	5,515	6.0
Republican	Andy Dulin	4,526	4.9
Republican	Mike Steinberg	2,297	2.5
Republican	Jon Gauthier	2,056	2.2
Republican	Ken Leonczyk	2,047	2.2
Republican	Richard Lynch	1,000	1.1
Republican	Michael Shaffer (withdrew)	579	0.6
Total votes		92,447	100.0

==== Runoff results ====
Republican primary runoff results
Party	Candidate	Votes	%
Republican	Robert Pittenger	18,982	52.9
Republican	Jim Pendergraph	16,902	47.1
Total votes		35,884	100.0

=== Democratic primary ===
==== Candidates ====
===== Nominee =====
- Jennifer Roberts, Mecklenburg County commissioner

===== Declined =====
- Patrick Cannon, mayor pro tem of Charlotte

=== General election ===
==== Endorsements ====
Robert Pittenger (R)

Statewide officials

- Mike Huckabee, former governor of Arkansas (1996–2007) and candidate for President in 2008

Organizations

- Eagle Forum
- FreedomWorks
- Huck PAC
- National Federation of Independent Business
- National Right to Life Committee
- NRA Political Victory Fund
- United States Chamber of Commerce
Jennifer Roberts (D)

Labor unions

- AFL-CIO

Organizations

- Sierra Club

Newspapers

- The Charlotte Observer

Local officials

- Lynda Paxton, Republican mayor of Stallings

Individuals

- Hugh McColl, former chairman and CEO of Bank of America

==== Predictions ====
Source	Ranking	As of
The Cook Political Report	Safe R	November 5, 2012
Rothenberg	Safe R	November 2, 2012
Roll Call	Safe R	November 4, 2012
Sabato's Crystal Ball	Safe R	November 5, 2012
NY Times	Safe R	November 4, 2012
RCP	Safe R	November 4, 2012
The Hill	Safe R	November 4, 2012

==== Results ====
North Carolina's 9th congressional district, 2012
Party	Candidate	Votes	%
Republican	Robert Pittenger	194,537	51.8
Democratic	Jennifer Roberts	171,503	45.6
Libertarian	Curtis Campbell	9,650	2.6
Total votes		375,690	100.0
Republican hold			

== District 10 ==
2012 North Carolina's 10th congressional district election
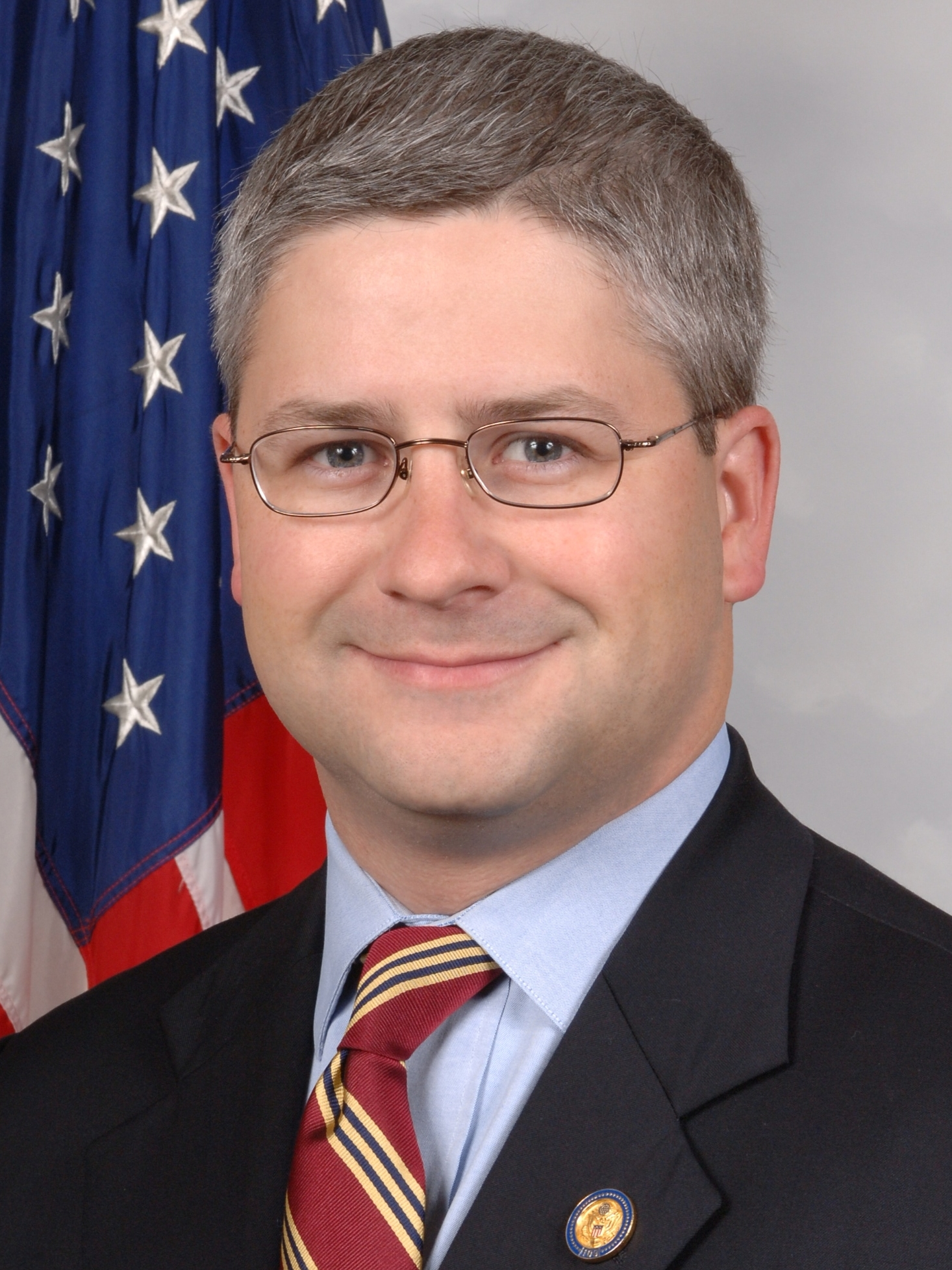

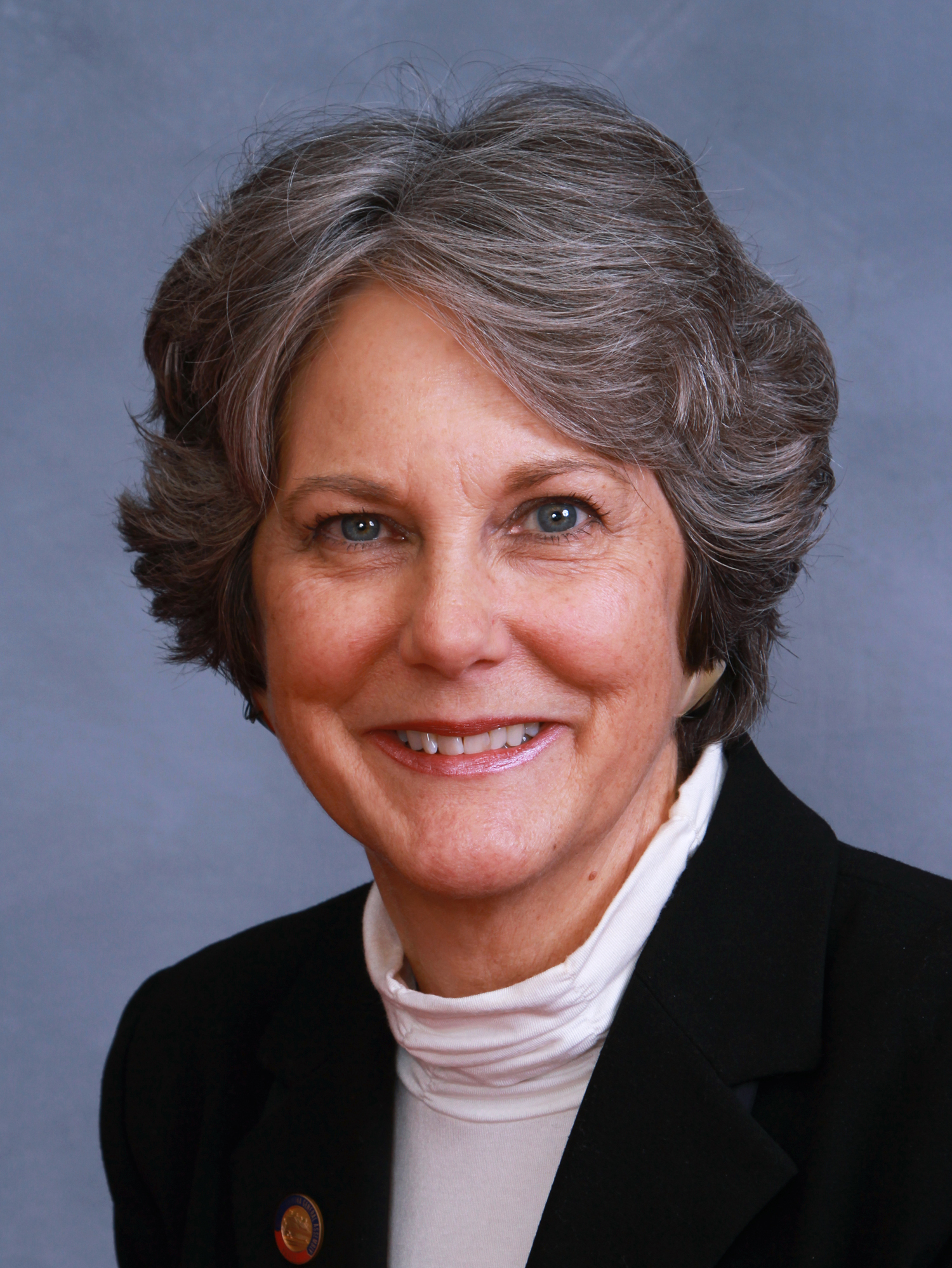
Nominee	Patrick McHenry	Patsy Keever
Party	Republican	Democratic
Popular vote	190,826	144,023
Percentage	57.0%	43.0%
- County results Mchenry: 50–60% 60–70% Keever: 60–70%
U.S. Representative before election
Patrick McHenry
Republican
Elected U.S. Representative
Patrick McHenry
Republican

Republican Patrick McHenry, who had represented North Carolina's 10th congressional district since 2005, ran for re-election. Though the 10th district was made more favorable to Democrats in redistricting, it was expected to continue to strongly favor Republicans.

=== Republican primary ===
==== Candidates ====
===== Nominee =====
- Patrick McHenry, incumbent U.S. representative

===== Eliminated in primary =====
- Ken Fortenberry, newspaper publisher
- Don Peterson

==== Primary results ====
Republican primary results
Party	Candidate	Votes	%
Republican	Patrick McHenry (incumbent)	58,844	72.5
Republican	Ken H. Fortenberry	15,936	19.7
Republican	Don Peterson	6,337	7.8
Total votes		81,117	100.0

=== Democratic primary ===
==== Candidates ====
===== Nominee =====
- Patsy Keever, state representative

===== Eliminated in primary =====
- Terry Bellamy, mayor of Asheville
- Timothy Murphy

===== Withdrawn =====
- Heath Wynn, adjunct professor at Catawba Valley Community College

==== Primary results ====
Democratic primary results
Party	Candidate	Votes	%
Democratic	Patsy Keever	36,791	57.9
Democratic	Terry Michelle Bellamy	16,865	26.5
Democratic	Timothy Murphy	9,908	15.6
Total votes		63,564	100.0

=== General election ===
==== Endorsements ====
Patrick McHenry (R)

Organizations

- Campaign for Working Families
- National Right to Life Committee
- NRA Political Victory Fund
- United States Chamber of Commerce
Patsy Keever (D)

Labor unions

- AFL-CIO
- National Education Association

Organizations

- Democracy for America
- National Organization for Women
- Planned Parenthood Action Fund
- Sierra Club

==== Predictions ====
Source	Ranking	As of
The Cook Political Report	Safe R	November 5, 2012
Rothenberg	Safe R	November 2, 2012
Roll Call	Safe R	November 4, 2012
Sabato's Crystal Ball	Safe R	November 5, 2012
NY Times	Safe R	November 4, 2012
RCP	Safe R	November 4, 2012
The Hill	Safe R	November 4, 2012

==== Results ====
North Carolina's 10th congressional district, 2012
Party	Candidate	Votes	%
Republican	Patrick McHenry (incumbent)	190,826	57.0
Democratic	Patsy Keever	144,023	43.0
Total votes		334,849	100.0
Republican hold			

== District 11 ==
2012 North Carolina's 11th congressional district election
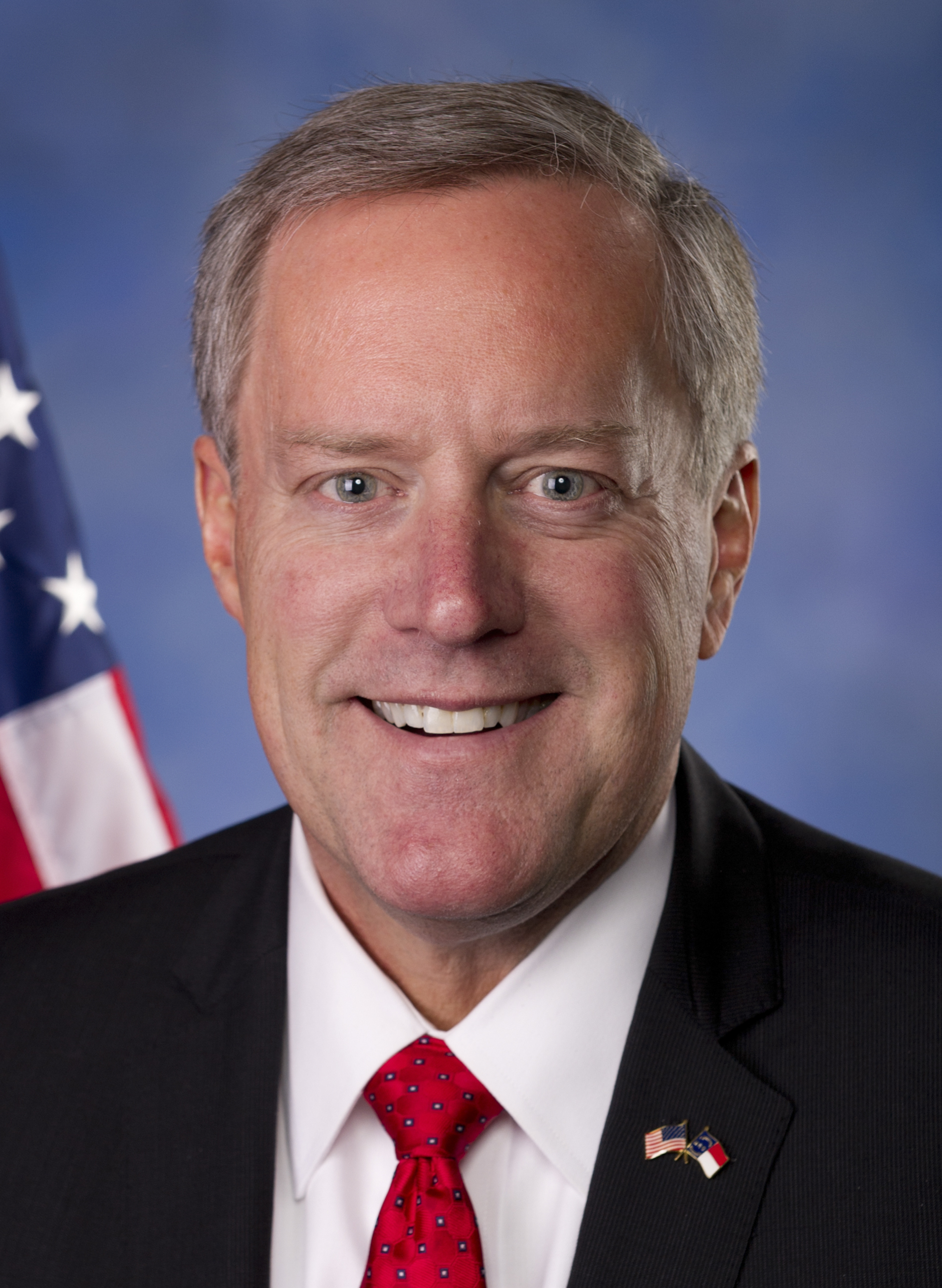

Nominee	Mark Meadows	Hayden Rogers
Party	Republican	Democratic
Popular vote	190,319	141,107
Percentage	57.4%	42.6%
- County results Meadows: 50–60% 60–70% 70–80% Rogers: 50–60%
U.S. Representative before election
Heath Shuler
Democratic
Elected U.S. Representative
Mark Meadows
Republican

Democrat Heath Shuler, who had represented North Carolina's 11th congressional district since 2007, chose not to run for re-election. The 11th district was made more favorable to Republicans in redistricting: more than three-quarters of voters in Asheville were removed from the district, while Avery, Burke, Caldwell and Mitchell counties, all of which favor Republicans, were added to it.

=== Democratic primary ===
==== Candidates ====
===== Nominee =====
- Hayden Rogers, Rep. Shuler's former chief of staff

===== Eliminated in primary =====
- Cecil Bothwell, Asheville city council-member
- Tom Hill, retired defense industry worker

===== Declined =====
- Heath Shuler, incumbent U.S. representative

==== Primary results ====
Democratic primary results
Party	Candidate	Votes	%
Democratic	Hayden Rogers	35,518	55.7
Democratic	Cecil Bothwell	19,161	30.1
Democratic	Tom Hill	9,049	14.2
Total votes		63,728	100.0

=== Republican primary ===
==== Candidates ====
===== Nominee =====
- Mark Meadows, real estate investor

===== Eliminated in primary =====
- Spence Campbell, retired U.S. Army colonel and nominee for this district in 2008
- Susan Harris, accountant
- Jeff Hunt, Henderson, Polk and Transylvania counties district attorney
- Vance Patterson, business owner and Tea Party member
- Chris Petrella, economic development consultant
- Kenny West, Clay County Republican Party chairman
- Ethan Wingfield, businessman

===== Withdrawn =====
- Dan Eichenbaum, ophthalmologist

===== Declined =====
- Jeff Miller, businessman and nominee for this district in 2010

==== Primary results ====
Republican primary results
Party	Candidate	Votes	%
Republican	Mark Meadows	35,733	37.8
Republican	Vance Patterson	22,306	23.6
Republican	Jeff Hunt	13,353	14.2
Republican	Ethan Wingfield	10,697	11.3
Republican	Susan Harris	5,825	6.2
Republican	Kenny West	3,970	4.2
Republican	Spence Campbell	1,799	1.9
Republican	Chris Petrella	778	0.8
Total votes		94,461	100.0

==== Runoff results ====
Republican primary runoff results
Party	Candidate	Votes	%
Republican	Mark Meadows	17,520	76.2
Republican	Vance Patterson	5,471	23.8
Total votes		22,991	100.0

=== General election ===
==== Endorsements ====
Hayden Rogers (D)

U.S. representatives

- Heath Shuler, U.S. representative from North Carolina's 11th congressional district (2007–present)

Labor unions

- AFL-CIO
- National Association of Letter Carriers
- National Education Association
- North Carolina Association of Educators
- United Steelworkers

Organizations

- Blue Dog Coalition
- Democratic Congressional Campaign Committee "Red to Blue" Program
- Sierra Club
Mark Meadows (R)

U.S. representatives

- Patrick McHenry, U.S. representative from North Carolina's 10th congressional district (2005–present)

State legislators

- Phillip Frye, state representative (2003–present)
- Jim Jacumin, state senator from the 44th district (2005–2011)

Organizations

- Campaign for Working Families
- Eagle Forum
- Family Research Council
- National Federation of Independent Business
- National Republican Congressional Committee "Young Guns" Program
- National Right to Life Committee
- Tea Party Express

==== Predictions ====
Source	Ranking	As of
The Cook Political Report	Likely R (flip)	November 5, 2012
Rothenberg	Likely R (flip)	November 2, 2012
Roll Call	Safe R (flip)	November 4, 2012
Sabato's Crystal Ball	Likely R (flip)	November 5, 2012
NY Times	Lean R (flip)	November 4, 2012
RCP	Likely R (flip)	November 4, 2012
The Hill	Likely R (flip)	November 4, 2012

==== Results ====
North Carolina's 11th congressional district, 2012
Party	Candidate	Votes	%
Republican	Mark Meadows	190,319	57.4
Democratic	Hayden Rogers	141,107	42.6
Total votes		331,426	100.0
Republican gain from Democratic			

== District 12 ==
2012 North Carolina's 12th congressional district election
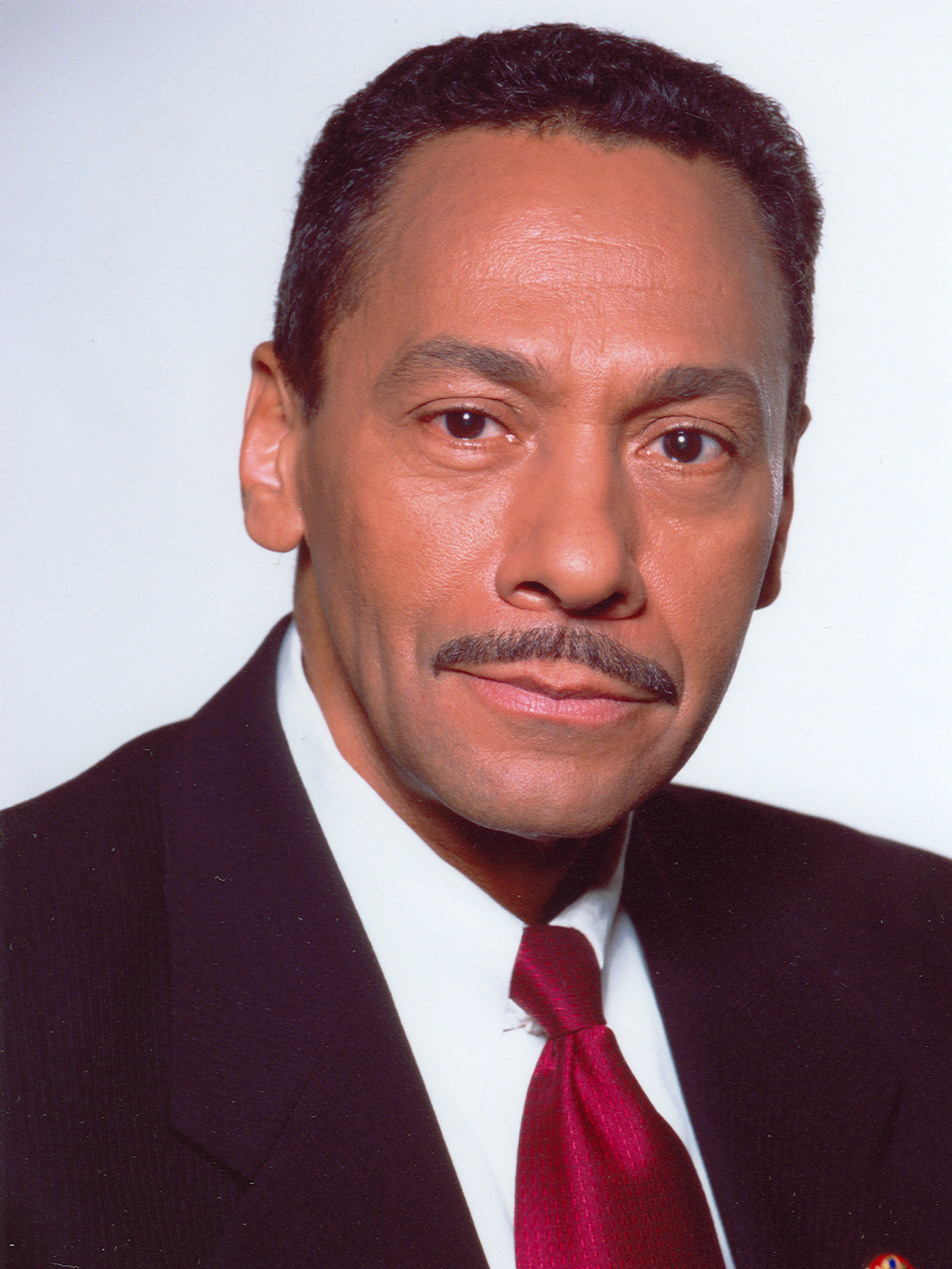

Nominee	Mel Watt	Jack Brosch
Party	Democratic	Republican
Popular vote	247,591	63,317
Percentage	79.6%	20.4%
- County results Watt: 50–60% 80–90% 90–100% Brosch: 50–60%
U.S. Representative before election
Mel Watt
Democratic
Elected U.S. Representative
Mel Watt
Democratic

Democrat Mel Watt, who had represented North Carolina's 12th congressional district since 1993, ran for re-election. The 12th district was made more favorable to Democrats in redistricting.

Watt faced Republican Jack Brosch and Libertarian Lon Cecil in the general election in November.

=== Democratic primary ===
==== Candidates ====
===== Nominee =====
- Mel Watt, incumbent U.S. representative

===== Eliminated in primary =====
- Matt Newton, attorney and former Occupy movement protester

===== Declined =====
- Melvin Alston, Guilford County commissioner

==== Primary results ====
Democratic primary results
Party	Candidate	Votes	%
Democratic	Mel Watt (incumbent)	52,968	80.9
Democratic	Matt Newton	12,495	19.1
Total votes		65,463	100.0

=== Republican primary ===
==== Candidates ====
===== Nominee =====
- Jack Brosch, business owner

=== General election ===
==== Endorsements ====
Melvin Watt (D)

Labor unions

- AFL-CIO
- National Association of Letter Carriers
- National Education Association
- North Carolina Association of Educators
- United Steelworkers

Organizations

- Human Rights Campaign
- J Street
- Planned Parenthood Action Fund
- Sierra Club

Newspapers

- The Charlotte Observer
- Greensboro News and Record

==== Predictions ====
Source	Ranking	As of
The Cook Political Report	Safe D	November 5, 2012
Rothenberg	Safe D	November 2, 2012
Roll Call	Safe D	November 4, 2012
Sabato's Crystal Ball	Safe D	November 5, 2012
NY Times	Safe D	November 4, 2012
RCP	Safe D	November 4, 2012
The Hill	Safe D	November 4, 2012

==== Results ====
North Carolina's 12th congressional district, 2012
Party	Candidate	Votes	%
Democratic	Melvin Watt (incumbent)	247,591	79.6
Republican	Jack Brosch	63,317	20.4
Total votes		310,908	100.0
Democratic hold			

== District 13 ==
2012 North Carolina's 13th congressional district election
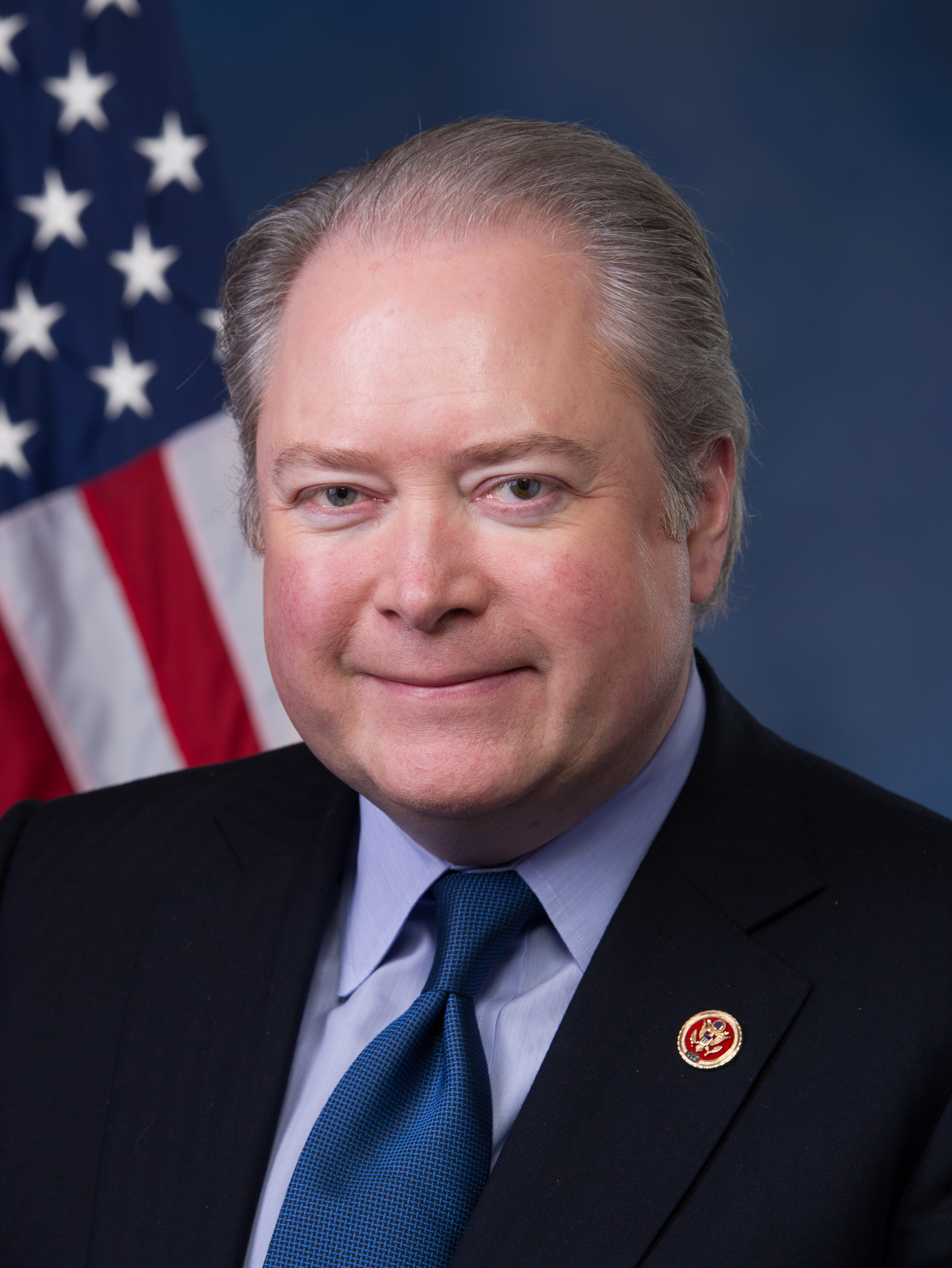

Nominee	George Holding	Charles Malone
Party	Republican	Democratic
Popular vote	210,495	160,115
Percentage	56.8%	43.2%
- County results Holding: 50–60% 60–70% Malone: 50–60%
U.S. Representative before election
Brad Miller
Democratic
Elected U.S. Representative
George Holding
Republican

Democrat Brad Miller, who had represented North Carolina's 13th congressional district since 2003, did not seek re-election. The 13th district was made more favorable to Republicans in redistricting.

=== Democratic primary ===
==== Candidates ====
===== Nominee =====
- Charles Malone, state employee and nominee for state senate's 15th district in 2010.

===== Eliminated in primary =====
- Bernard Holliday, Baptist minister

===== Declined =====
- Brad Miller, incumbent U.S. representative

===== Primary results =====
Democratic primary results
Party	Candidate	Votes	%
Democratic	Charles Malone	45,865	66.9
Democratic	Bernard Holliday	22,703	33.1
Total votes		68,568	100.0

=== Republican primary ===
==== Candidates ====
===== Nominee =====
- George Holding, former U.S. attorney for the Eastern District of North Carolina

===== Eliminated in primary =====
- Paul Coble, Wake County commissioner
- Bill Randall, U.S. Navy retiree and nominee for this district in 2010

===== Declined =====
- Phil Berger Jr., Rockingham County district attorney
- Vernon Robinson, former Winston-Salem city council member and nominee for this district in 2006 (running in the 8th district)
- Nathan Tabor, candidate for the 5th district in 2004

==== Primary results ====
Republican primary results
Party	Candidate	Votes	%
Republican	George Holding	37,341	43.5
Republican	Paul Coble	29,354	34.2
Republican	Bill Randall	19,119	22.3
Total votes		85,814	100.0

=== General election ===
==== Endorsements ====
Charles Malone (D)

Labor unions

- AFL-CIO

Newspapers

- Indy Week
George Holding (R)

Statewide officials

- I. Beverly Lake Jr., chief justice of the North Carolina Supreme Court (2001–2006) and nominee for governor in 1980

State legislators

- N. Leo Daughtry, state representative (1993–2017) and candidate for governor in 2000

Organizations

- NRA Political Victory Fund
- United States Chamber of Commerce

Newspapers

- Raleigh News & Observer

==== Predictions ====
Source	Ranking	As of
The Cook Political Report	Likely R (flip)	November 5, 2012
Rothenberg	Safe R (flip)	November 2, 2012
Roll Call	Safe R (flip)	November 4, 2012
Sabato's Crystal Ball	Safe R (flip)	November 5, 2012
NY Times	Lean R (flip)	November 4, 2012
RCP	Safe R (flip)	November 4, 2012
The Hill	Likely R (flip)	November 4, 2012

==== Results ====
North Carolina's 13th congressional district, 2012
Party	Candidate	Votes	%
Republican	George Holding	210,495	56.8
Democratic	Charles Malone	160,115	43.2
Total votes		370,610	100.0
Republican gain from Democratic			

== See also ==
- Gerrymandering
