= Nash-Fortenberry UFO sighting =

1952 UFO incident in Virginia, US

The Nash-Fortenberry UFO sighting was an unidentified flying object sighting that occurred on 14 July 1952. Two commercial pilots, William B. Nash and William H. Fortenberry, claimed to have seen eight UFOs flying in a tight echelon formation over the Chesapeake Bay in the state of Virginia.

Ufologists say the pilots' observation allowed for relatively precise measurements of the objects' motion and size when compared to known landmarks, and that the encounter was corroborated by several groups of independent ground witnesses. The case was listed in the U.S. Air Force's Project Blue Book as an "unknown".

Donald Howard Menzel, in his book The World of Flying Saucers (1963), suggested some possible naturalistic explanations. He suggested that the pilots may have seen lights on the ground that were distorted by haze. He later suggested they may have seen fireflies that were trapped between the panes of glass in their cockpit window.

Skeptical researcher Steuart Campbell suggested the pilots' UFO sighting was a mirage of Venus.
