= Kay Hagan =

American lawyer, banking executive, and politician (1953–2019)

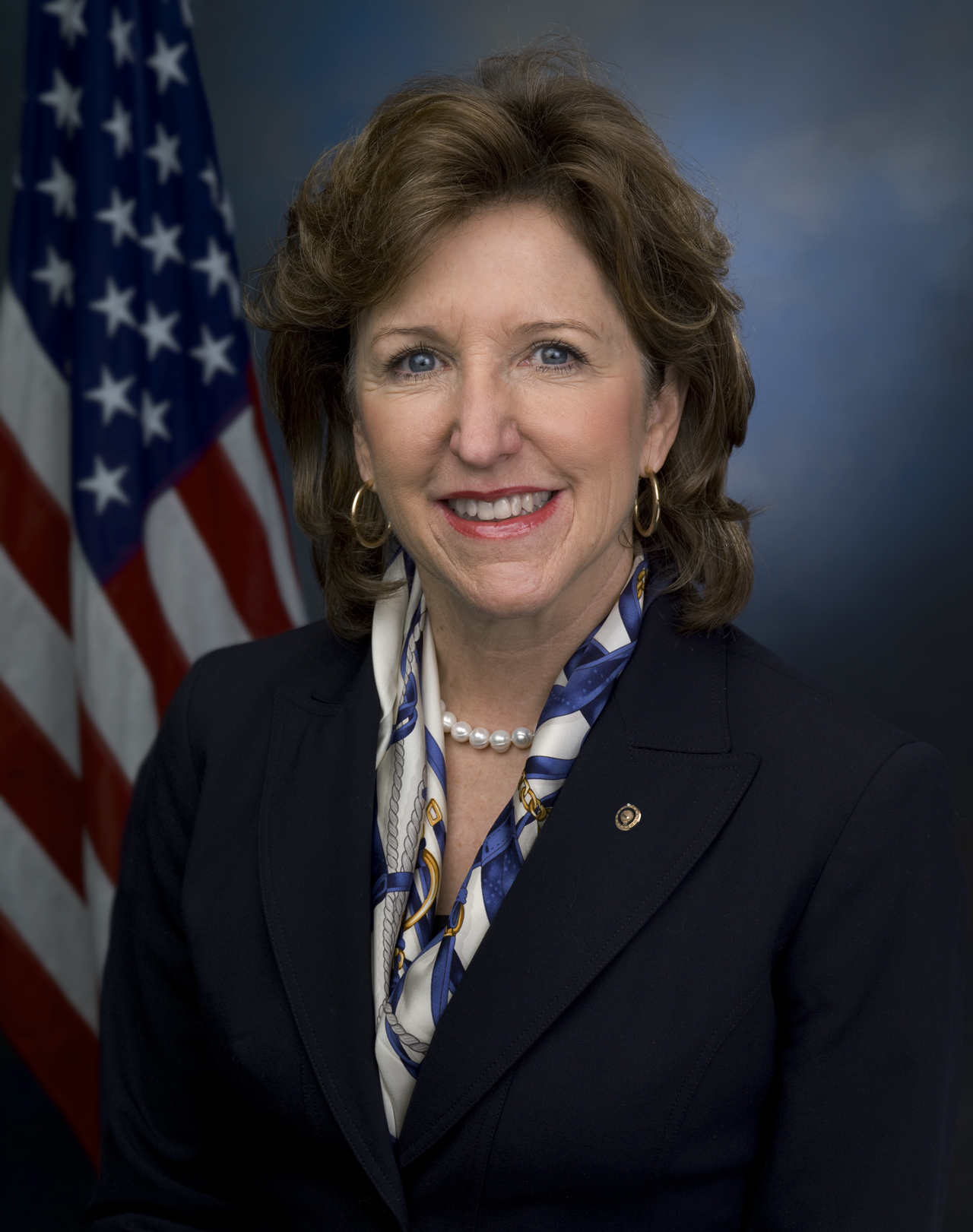
- Official portrait, 2009

United States Senator from North Carolina
- In office January 3, 2009 – January 3, 2015
- Preceded by: Elizabeth Dole
- Succeeded by: Thom Tillis

Member of the North Carolina Senate
- In office January 27, 1999 – January 3, 2009
- Preceded by: John Blust
- Succeeded by: Don Vaughan
- Constituency: 32nd district (1999–2003); 27th district (2003–2009)

Personal details
- Born: Janet Kay Ruthven; May 26, 1953 Shelby, North Carolina, U.S.
- Died: October 28, 2019 (aged 66) Greensboro, North Carolina, U.S.
- Resting place: First Presbyterian Church of Greensboro
- Party: Democratic
- Spouse: Charles T. Hagan III
- Relatives: Lawton Chiles (uncle)
- Education: Florida State University (BA); Wake Forest University (JD)
- Kay Hagan's voice Hagan speaks in support of S.2237, the Small Business Jobs and Tax Relief Act; Recorded July 12, 2012

Janet Kay Hagan (née Ruthven; May 26, 1953 – October 28, 2019) was an American lawyer, banking executive, and politician who served as a United States senator from North Carolina from 2009 to 2015. A member of the Democratic Party, she previously served in the North Carolina Senate from 1999 to 2009. By defeating Republican Elizabeth Dole in the 2008 election, she became the first woman to defeat an incumbent woman in a U.S. Senate election. She ran for re-election in 2014 and lost to Republican Thom Tillis, Speaker of the North Carolina House of Representatives, in a close race. Hagan was the last Democrat to represent North Carolina in the U.S. Senate until 2026 United States Senate elections, when Roy Cooper was elected.

== Early life and education ==
Hagan was born Janet Kay Ruthven in Shelby, North Carolina, the daughter of Jeanette (née Chiles), a homemaker, and Josie Perry "Joe" Ruthven, a tire salesman. Her maternal uncle was the Lakeland native and U.S. Senator Lawton Chiles (D-Fla.), who later became Governor of Florida following his service in the U.S. Senate. Both Hagan's father and her brother served in the U.S. Navy. She spent most of her childhood in Lakeland, Florida, and graduated from Lakeland Senior High School in 1971.

Leaving the tire business, her father branched out into real estate development, primarily focused on industrial warehouses and warehouse-centered business parks in the Lakeland and Polk County, Florida area. Her father later became mayor of Lakeland.

Hagan also spent summers on her grandparents' farm in Chesterfield, South Carolina, where she helped string tobacco and harvest watermelons. In the 1970s, she was an intern at the Capitol, operating an elevator that carried senators, including her uncle Lawton, to and from the Chamber.

She earned a Bachelor of Arts degree from Florida State University in 1975 and a Juris Doctor degree from the Wake Forest University School of Law in 1978, later pursuing a career as both an attorney and banker. While a student at Florida State, Hagan became a member of the Chi Omega sorority, though she later resigned her membership.

Prior to beginning her political career, Hagan worked in the financial industry. During this time she became a vice president of North Carolina's largest bank, NCNB (North Carolina National Bank), which is now a part of Bank of America. Hagan became a county campaign manager for Governor Jim Hunt's gubernatorial campaign.

== North Carolina legislature ==
Hagan was first elected to the North Carolina General Assembly as state Senator for the 32nd district in 1998 (due to redistricting, her constituency later became the 27th district). During the 1998 campaign, her uncle Lawton Chiles walked the district with her. For five terms, she represented Guilford County, including Greensboro.

== U.S. Senate ==
=== 2008 election ===
After Hagan first decided not to run against Elizabeth Dole, the Swing State Project announced on October 26, 2007, that two independent sources had reported that Hagan would, in fact, run. Hagan made her candidacy official on October 30, 2007. She defeated investment banker Jim Neal of Chapel Hill, podiatrist Howard Staley of Chatham County, Lexington truck driver Duskin Lassiter, and Lumberton attorney Marcus Williams in the May 2008 Democratic primary.

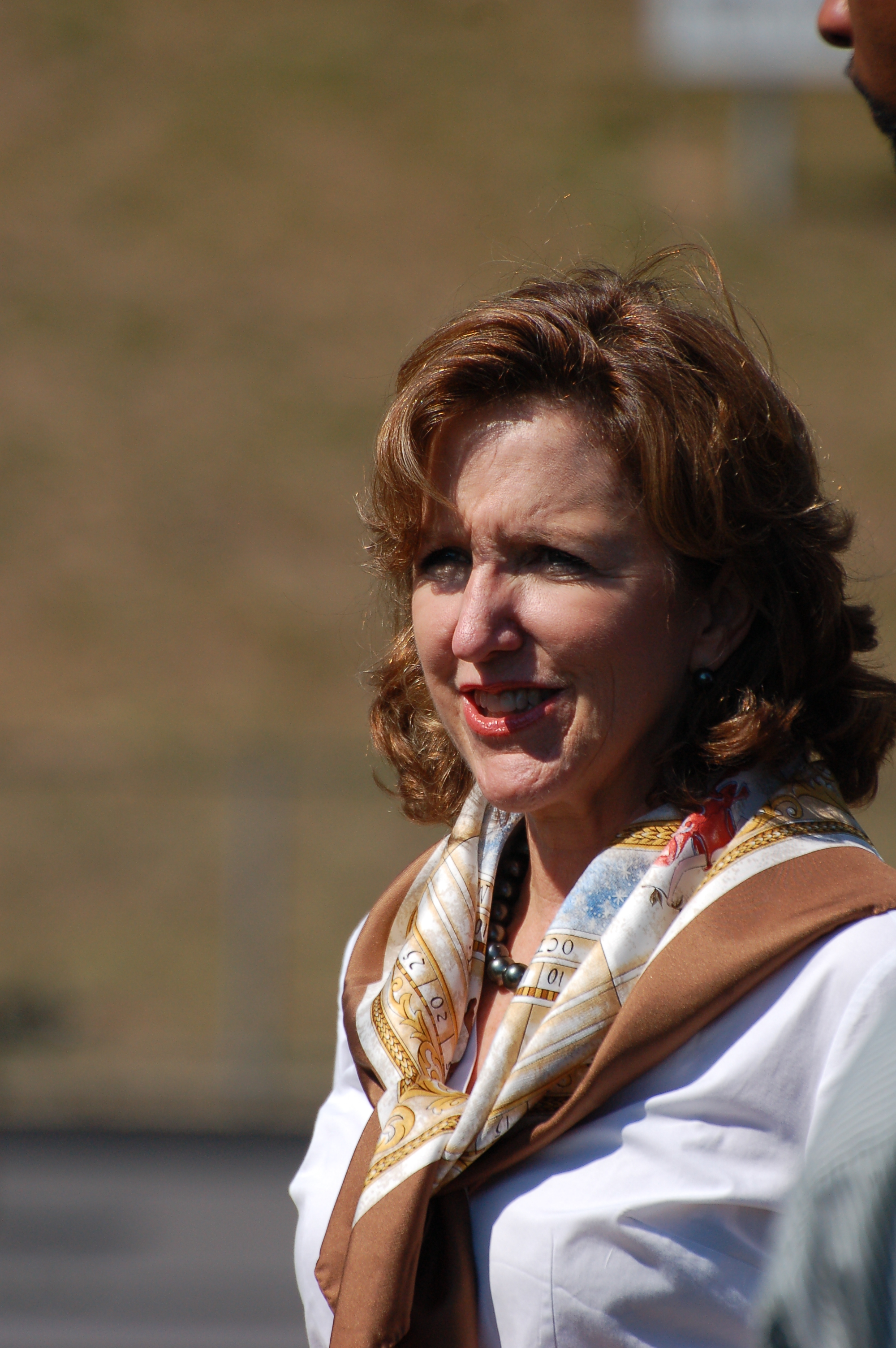
Hagan at a Barack Obama rally in 2008

She was recruited to the race only after more prominent North Carolina Democrats such as Governor Mike Easley, former Governor Jim Hunt and Congressman Brad Miller all declined to compete against Dole. However, most polling from September onward showed Hagan slightly ahead of Dole, although Hagan had previously fallen behind by as many as 17 points at one point. Hagan was helped by Democratic presidential candidate Barack Obama's aggressive push for North Carolina's 15 electoral votes and by 527 groups lobbying on her behalf. The Democratic Senatorial Campaign Committee expended more money in North Carolina than in any other state during the 2008 election season.

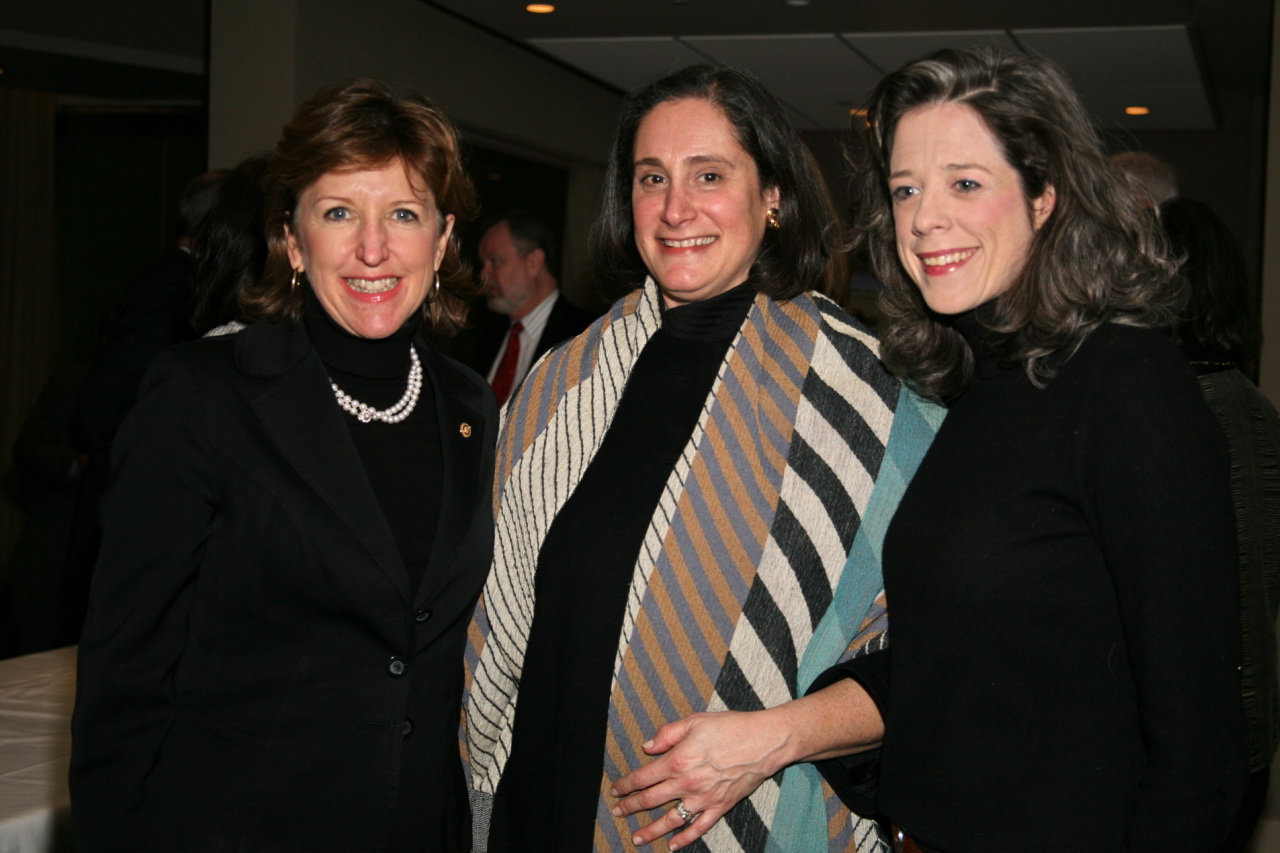
Kay Hagan, Susan Fisher Sterling, director of the National Museum of Women in the Arts and Heather Podesta at a 2009 party in Washington, D.C.

In late October, the Dole campaign released a television ad that stated the leader of the Godless Americans PAC had held "a secret fundraiser in Kay Hagan's honor." The ad showed sound bites of group members espousing their views, then stated Kay Hagan "hid from cameras, took Godless money... what did Hagan promise in return?" It ended with a photo of Hagan and a female voice saying, "There is no God." The ad aired across North Carolina. Hagan, a member of First Presbyterian Church of Greensboro and a former Sunday school teacher, condemned the ad as "fabricated and pathetic," and filed a lawsuit in Wake County Superior Court accusing Dole of defamation and libel. The ad was roundly criticized in local and several national media outlets, including by CNN's Campbell Brown, who said about the ad: "[A]mid all the attack ads on the airwaves competing to out-ugly one another, we think we've found a winner." Following Hagan's victory, the lawsuit was dropped.

In the November election, Hagan won with 53% of the vote to Dole's 44%. The Miami Herald reported that campaign ads on both sides were negative. Hagan's victory was partially attributed to anger over the "Godless" ad. Her victory returned the seat that had once been held by Jesse Helms to the Democrats. Helms had won the seat in 1972, and was succeeded by Dole in 2003.

=== 2014 election ===
Hagan ran for re-election in 2014. The Washington Post considered her seat shaky. The Fiscal Times reported that Hagan benefitted from a presidential election, with its higher voter turnout, in 2008 and that without one in 2014 the race appeared to be a toss-up. Hagan declined to attend ceremonies for President Barack Obama's January 2014 visit to North Carolina, deciding instead to remain in Washington for Senate votes. Pundits questioned whether Hagan was attempting to distance herself from the President, whose popularity in North Carolina had waned significantly after he won narrowly the state in his 2008 presidential bid.

Hagan had been the target of numerous negative ads paid for by Americans for Prosperity, which had spent over $7 million on the race by the end of March 2014. As part of a $3 million offensive effort against those efforts in early 2014, the Senate Majority PAC released ads supporting Hagan. In July 2014, Hagan had the largest cash-on-hand advantage of any vulnerable Democratic senator. She was endorsed by Vice President Joe Biden. In September 2014, Bill Clinton announced plans to campaign for Hagan. Hagan faced Republican state House Speaker Thom Tillis and Libertarian Sean Haugh in the general election on Tuesday, November 4. Hagan declined to participate in a scheduled October 21 debate. She was a speaker at the state AFL–CIO convention. After a close race, Kay Hagan lost her bid for re-election by roughly 45,000 votes, or by 1.5%.

=== 2016 U.S. Senate race ===
Hagan was called on by national Democrats to launch another Senate bid. In an interview in Boston, Hagan said she was seriously considering it. She was said to be the strongest potential challenger against incumbent senator Richard Burr. On June 24, 2015, Hagan announced on Facebook that she would not run for the Senate in 2016.

=== Committee assignments ===
- Committee on Armed Services
  - Subcommittee on Airland
  - Subcommittee on Personnel
  - Subcommittee on Seapower
  - Subcommittee on Emerging Threats and Capabilities (chair)
- Committee on Banking, Housing, and Urban Affairs
  - Subcommittee on Economic Policy
  - Subcommittee on Financial Institutions and Consumer Protection
  - Subcommittee on Securities, Insurance, and Investment
- Committee on Health, Education, Labor, and Pensions
  - Subcommittee on Children and Families (chair)
  - Subcommittee on Employment and Workplace Safety
- Committee on Small Business and Entrepreneurship

== Political positions ==
=== Economic issues ===
On February 13, 2009, Hagan voted to pass the American Recovery and Reinvestment Act of 2009.

In December 2010, Hagan voted against a bill extending both the Bush tax cuts and unemployment benefits. The bill passed the Senate with a vote of 81–19, with opposition from both conservatives and progressives.

On March 23, 2013, Hagan was one of only four Democratic Senators to vote against the Senate's first approved budget in four years.

In May 2013, Hagan voted in favor of the Marketplace Fairness Act, which requires online stores to collect state sales tax in the same fashion as brick-and-mortar stores.

=== Outdoor Recreation ===
On May 20, 2014, Hagan introduced the Bipartisan Sportsmen's Act of 2014 (S. 2363; 113th Congress), a bill related to hunting, fishing, and outdoor recreation in the United States, aimed at improving "the public's ability to enjoy the outdoors."

=== Gun rights ===
On April 17, 2013, Hagan voted to expand background checks for gun purchasers. She also voted not to reinstate the Feinstein ban on "assault weapons", nor to ban "large capacity ammunition feeding devices".

=== Healthcare ===
In December 2009, Hagan voted for the Affordable Care Act, and she later voted for the Health Care and Education Reconciliation Act of 2010.

On September 27, 2013, Hagan voted to restore funding for the Affordable Care Act as part of an amendment to legislation funding government operations for 45 days, and which also omitted House-passed language prioritizing debt payments if Congress fails to increase the nation's borrowing limits.

The Washington Post's Dana Milbank argued at the time that Hagan was destabilizing her own Senate political career due to her difficulty communicating the reasons for her support of Obamacare to her own constituents.

In 2009, Hagan voted for the Children's Health Insurance Reauthorization Act of 2009, a successful $32.8 billion measure that funded increased health coverage for children while raising the cigarette tax by 62 cents a pack. Hagan opposed the Family Smoking Prevention and Tobacco Control Act, which was signed into law in 2009.

=== Immigration ===
On December 18, 2010, Hagan was one of only five Democrats to vote against the DREAM Act. The bill failed in the Senate.

In June 2013, Hagan voted against an amendment to require the completion of 350 miles of fence described in the Illegal Immigration Reform and Immigrant Responsibility Act of 1996 before registered provisional immigrant status may be granted. It would also require 700 miles of fence be completed before the status of registered provisional immigrants may be changed to permanent resident status.

=== Privacy issues ===
Hagan co-sponsored PROTECT IP Act (PIPA), a proposed law with the stated goal of giving the U.S. government and copyright holders additional tools to curb access to "rogue websites dedicated to the sale of infringing or counterfeit goods", especially those registered outside the U.S. In the wake of online protests, Senate Majority Leader Harry Reid (D-Nevada) tabled the bill in January 2012.

=== Abortion ===
Hagan supported abortion rights for women and voted against a congressional plan to defund Planned Parenthood. Planned Parenthood quotes Hagan as saying "I am a strong supporter of a woman's right to choose ... I would like to see abortions be safe, legal, and rare. These decisions are best made privately by a woman in consultation with her doctor." Hagan also voted against a congressional plan to defund Planned Parenthood, who according to the News Observer plans to spend 3.3 million dollars on her re-election campaign. Hagan was endorsed by EMILY's List, an organization dedicated to electing pro-choice Democratic women to office. Hagan opposed the Pain-Capable Unborn Child Protection Act, which would ban abortions after 20 weeks. In August 2014, a protest occurred outside her offices in support of the bill.

=== LGBT rights ===
On December 18, 2010, Hagan voted in favor of the Don't Ask, Don't Tell Repeal Act of 2010.

Hagan opposed North Carolina's Amendment 1, a measure that defined marriage as a union between one man and one woman in North Carolina's Constitution. On March 27, 2013, Hagan announced her support of same-sex marriage.

== Lobbying career ==
In January 2016, Hagan joined the lobbying firm Akin Gump Strauss Hauer & Feld, Washington D.C.'s largest lobbying group by revenue.

== Personal life and death ==
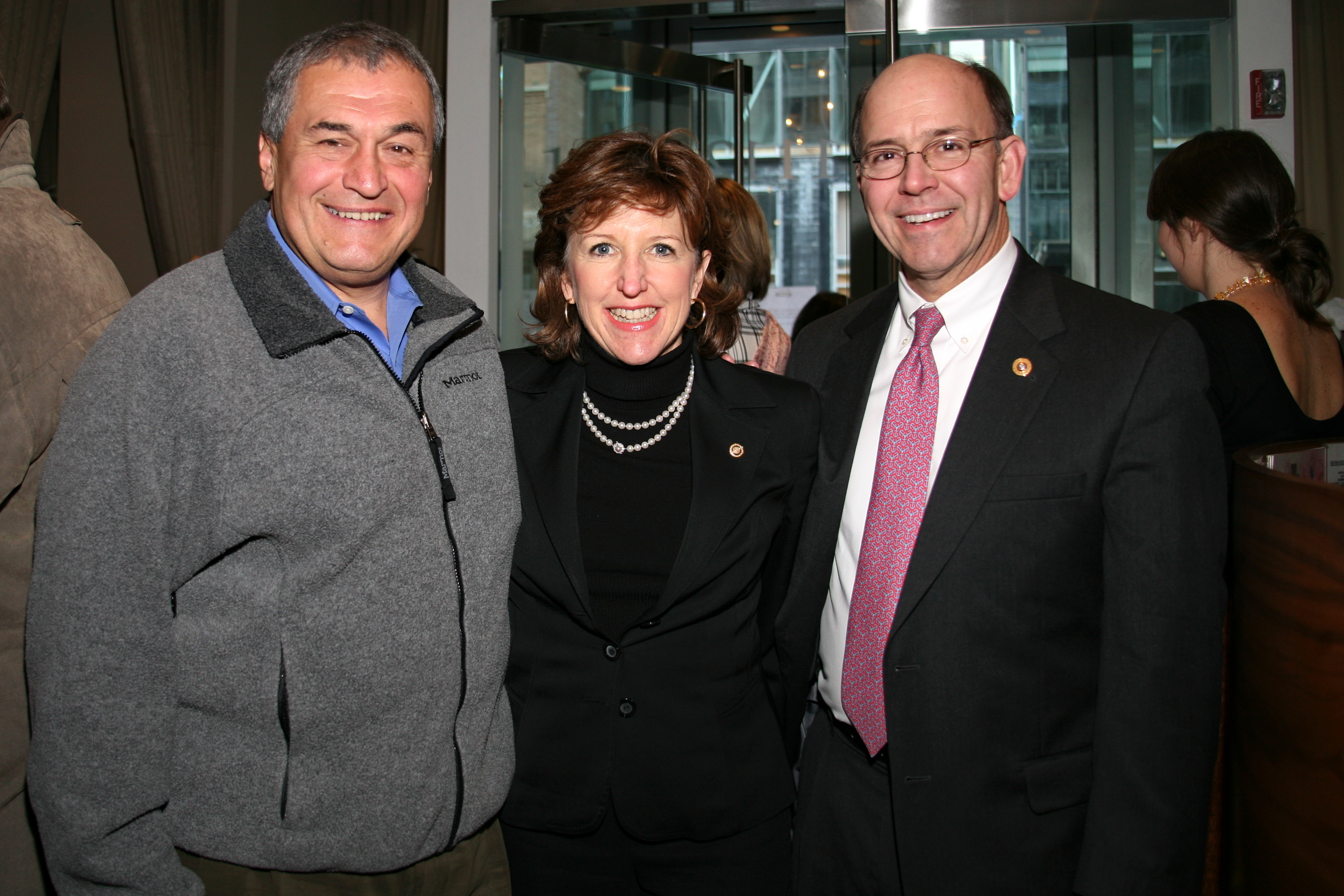
Hagan (center) with her husband (right) and lobbyist Tony Podesta in 2009

Hagan's widower, Charles Tilden "Chip" Hagan III, is a transaction lawyer. The Hagans had three children: Jeanette, Tilden, and Carrie. Kay Hagan had a 2012 net worth of approximately $24 million.

After the end of her U.S. Senate term, Hagan became a resident fellow at the Harvard Institute of Politics.

While in Washington, D.C., in December 2016, Hagan became ill with a type of encephalitis (inflammation of the brain) and was admitted to a hospital. The inflammation was due to Powassan virus, which Hagan's husband thought she received from a tick while hiking in 2016. In June 2019, Hagan's husband reported that "Kay's ability to speak is limited, but her comprehension is very good. She can speak, but it's slow and labored."

Hagan died on October 28, 2019, from complications of Powassan virus, at the age of 66. Her stepmother also died that day, shortly before her. Hagan's funeral was held on November 3, 2019, at the First Presbyterian Church of Greensboro. Among those in attendance at Hagan's funeral were former Democratic Senate colleagues Claire McCaskill, Amy Klobuchar, Mary Landrieu, and Blanche Lincoln, fellow North Carolina Senator and Republican Richard Burr, and incumbent North Carolina Governor Roy Cooper.

== Electoral history ==
2008 North Carolina U.S. Senate election
Party	Candidate	Votes	%	±%
Democratic	Kay Hagan	2,249,311	52.65	+7.7
Republican	Elizabeth Dole (incumbent)	1,887,510	44.18	−9.4
Libertarian	Chris Cole	133,430	3.12	+1.6
Other	Write-Ins	1,719	0.0	0
Majority		361,801		
Turnout		4,271,970		
Democratic gain from Republican		Swing		

2014 North Carolina U.S. Senate election
Party	Candidate	Votes	%	±%
Republican	Thom Tillis	1,423,259	48.82%	▲4.64
Democratic	Kay Hagan (incumbent)	1,377,651	47.26%	▼5.39
Libertarian	Sean Haugh	109,100	3.74%	▲0.62
Other	Write-ins	5,271	0.18%	▲0.14
Majority		45,608	1.56%	
Turnout		2,915,281		
Republican gain from Democratic		Swing	▲5.0	

== See also ==
- North Carolina Democratic Party
- U.S. Senate
- Women in the United States Senate

North Carolina Senate
Preceded by John Blust	Member from 32nd district 1999–2003	Succeeded by Linda Garrou
Preceded by John Garwood	Member from 27th district 2003–2009	Succeeded by Don Vaughan
Party political offices
Preceded by Erskine Bowles	Democratic nominee for U.S. Senator from North Carolina (Class 2); 2008, 2014	Succeeded by Cal Cunningham
U.S. Senate
Preceded by Elizabeth Dole	U.S. Senator (Class 2) from North Carolina; 2009–2015; Served alongside: Richard Burr	Succeeded by Thom Tillis
