= Jim Banks =

American politician (born 1979)

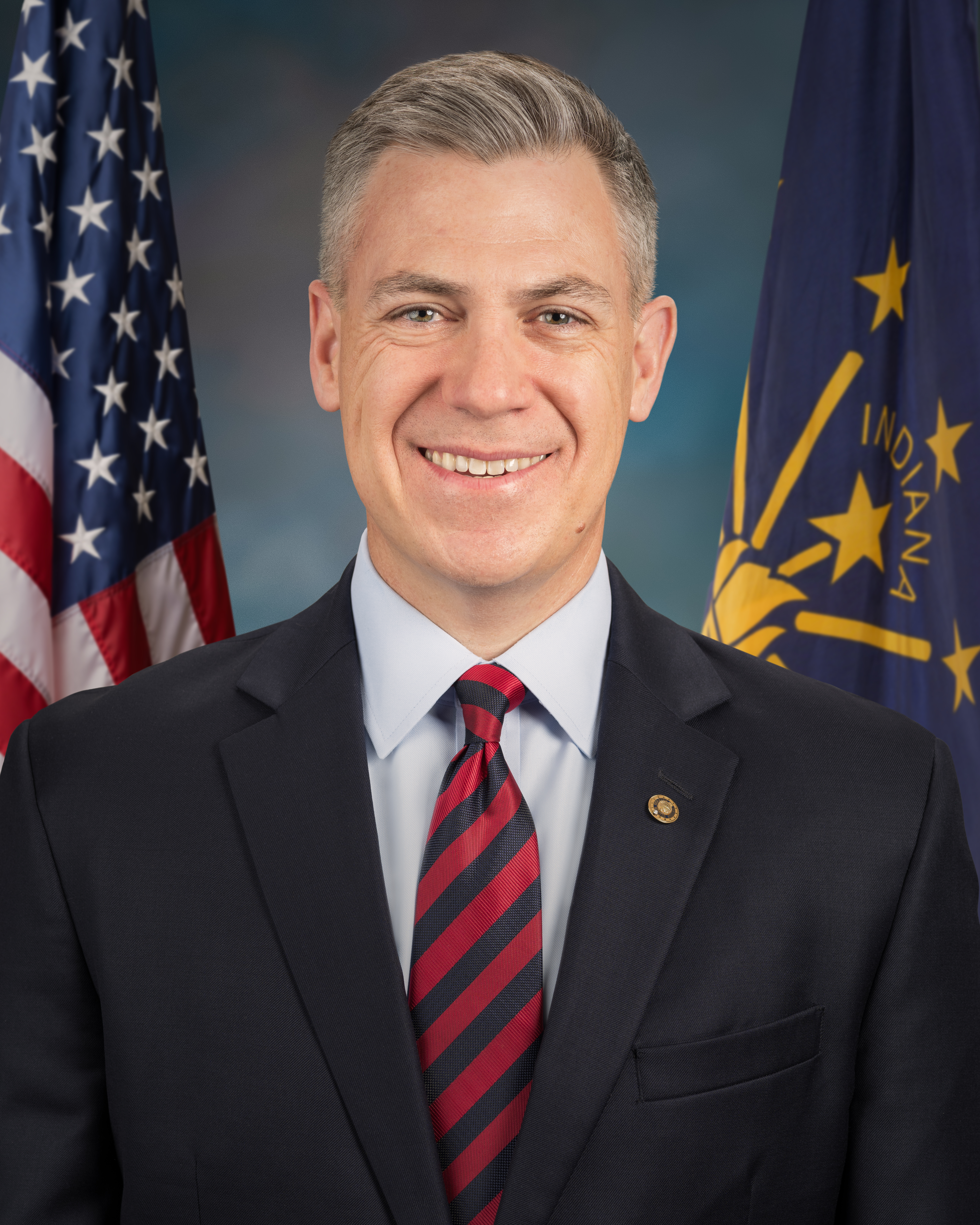
- Official portrait, 2025

United States Senator from Indiana
- Incumbent
- Assumed office January 3, 2025 Serving with Todd Young
- Preceded by: Mike Braun

Chair of the Republican Study Committee
- In office January 3, 2021 – January 3, 2023
- Preceded by: Mike Johnson
- Succeeded by: Kevin Hern

Member of the U.S. House of Representatives from Indiana's 3rd district
- In office January 3, 2017 – January 3, 2025
- Preceded by: Marlin Stutzman
- Succeeded by: Marlin Stutzman

Member of the Indiana Senate from the 17th district
- In office November 16, 2010 – November 9, 2016
- Preceded by: Gary P. Dillon
- Succeeded by: Andy Zay

Member of the Whitley County Council from the at-large district
- In office 2008–2010
- Preceded by: Scott Darley
- Succeeded by: Paula Reimers

Personal details
- Born: James Edward Banks; July 16, 1979 (age 47) Columbia City, Indiana, U.S.
- Party: Republican
- Spouse: Amanda Izsak (m. 2005)
- Children: 3
- Education: Indiana University, Bloomington (BA); Grace College and Seminary (MBA)
- Website: Senate website Campaign website

Military service
- Branch/service: United States Navy; U.S Navy Reserve
- Years of service: 2012–present
- Rank: Lieutenant
- Unit: Navy Supply Corps
- Battles/wars: War in Afghanistan
- Banks' voice Banks supporting the SAVE Act. Recorded July 29, 2026

James Edward Banks (born July 16, 1979) is an American politician and naval officer serving since 2025 as the junior United States senator from Indiana. A member of the Republican Party, he was the U.S. representative for Indiana's 3rd congressional district from 2017 to 2025 and an Indiana state senator from 2010 to 2016.

A graduate of Indiana University Bloomington, Banks served on the Whitley County Council before being elected to the State Senate in 2010. During his tenure, he joined the United States Navy Reserve. In 2016, Banks was elected to the U.S. House of Representatives. He was reelected in 2018, 2020, and 2022. After incumbent U.S. senator Mike Braun declined to run for reelection, Banks announced he would run in the 2024 election to replace him. After winning the Republican nomination unopposed, he defeated Democratic nominee Valerie McCray in the general election.

== Early life, education, and career ==
Banks was born on July 16, 1979, in Columbia City, Indiana. He graduated in 2004 from Indiana University Bloomington with a Bachelor of Arts in political science and later received a Master of Business Administration from Grace College & Seminary. Banks worked in the real estate and construction industry in Fort Wayne, Indiana, before serving in elected office. He serves in the United States Navy Reserve as a Supply Corps officer. From 2014 to 2015, he took a leave of absence from the Indiana State Senate to serve in Afghanistan.

From 2008 to 2010, Banks represented the at-large district on the Whitley County Council. He won the primary after defeating incumbent county councilman Scott Darley. Paula Reimers succeeded him on the County Council. Banks chaired the Whitley County Republican Party from 2007 to 2011. Matt Boyd succeeded him as chair. With assistance from the American Legislative Exchange Council, Banks has supported right-to-work legislation in Indiana. He addressed the 2014 Conservative Political Action Conference in 2014 after he was selected as one of their Top 10 Conservatives Under 40.

In 2010, Banks was elected to represent the 17th district in the State Senate. Upon military deployment to Afghanistan, he took a leave of absence from the State Senate in September 2014. Invoking an Indiana state law that allows state and local office holders to take leaves of absence during active duty military service, Banks was replaced by his wife, Amanda Banks, during the 2015 legislative session. He returned to Indiana from overseas duty on April 14, 2015, and resumed his duties as state senator on May 8.

== U.S. House of Representatives ==
=== Elections ===
==== 2016 ====
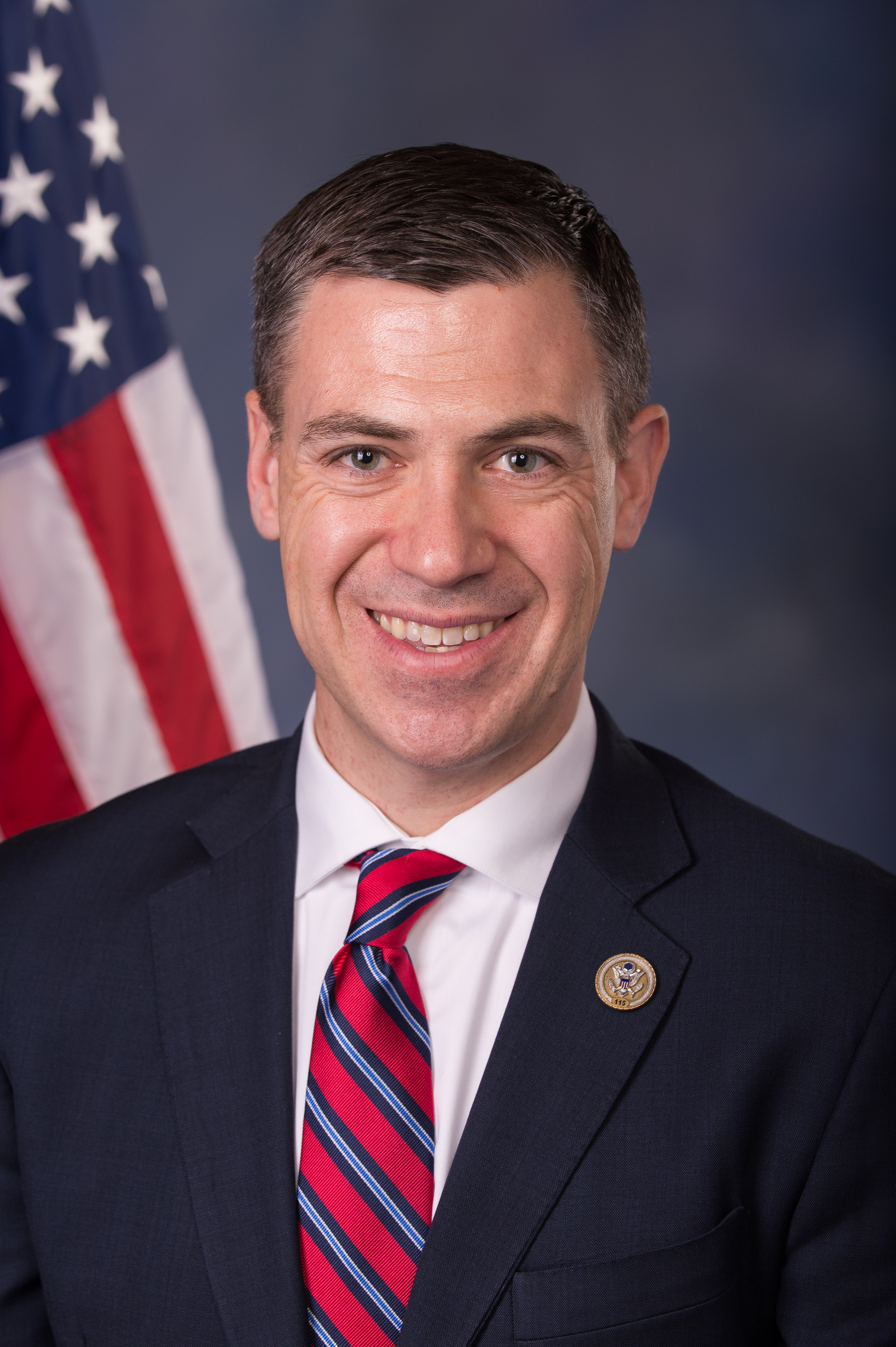
Representative Jim Banks during the 115th Congress

On May 12, 2015, Banks announced his candidacy for Congress. The incumbent, Marlin Stutzman, announced he would not run for reelection and would instead run for the Republican nomination to succeed retiring Indiana senator Dan Coats. The Club for Growth endorsed Banks.

Banks defeated five opponents in the primary with 34% of the vote. Spending in the campaign exceeded $2 million as Banks raised $850,000 before the primary and the candidate who finished second, businessman Kip Tom, raised $950,000, including $150,000 he loaned from his personal funds.

==== 2018 ====
Banks was reelected; he was unopposed in the Republican primary and defeated Democratic nominee Courtney Tritch in the general election with 64.7% of the vote.

==== 2020 ====
Banks was elected to a third term, defeating physician Chris Magiera in the Republican primary and Democratic nominee Chip Coldiron in the general election with 67.8% of the vote.

=== Tenure ===
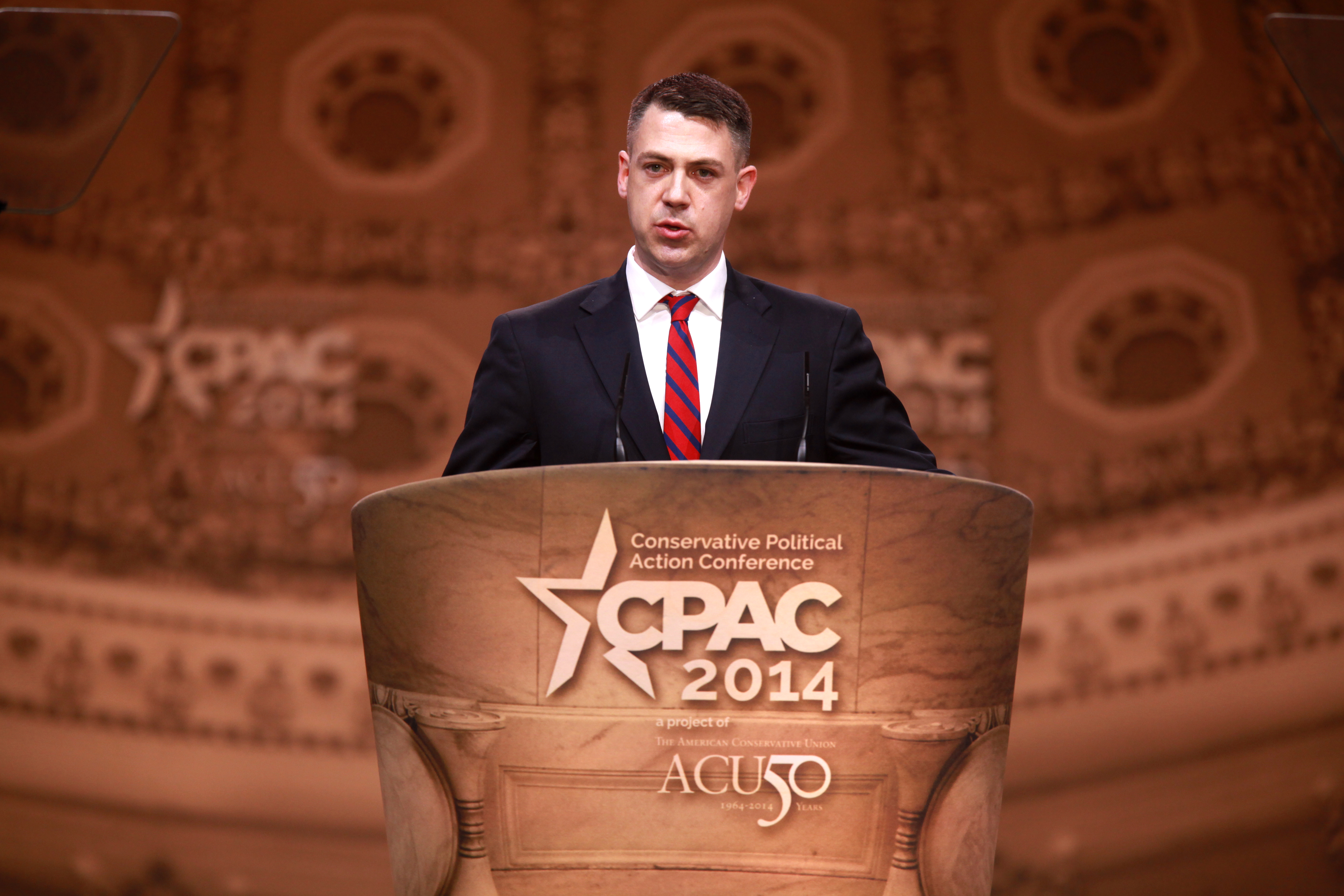
Banks speaking at CPAC 2014.

Banks was sworn in on January 3, 2017. He is a member of the Republican Study Committee.

In December 2017, Banks joined representatives Ron DeSantis, Scott Perry, and Robert Pittenger in co-signing a letter to Secretary of State Rex Tillerson requesting that Tillerson release a classified counterterrorism agreement with Qatar.

Banks with president Trump in 2020

In January 2020, Banks faced backlash after saying that remarks by Representative Ilhan Omar about her experiences with post-traumatic stress disorder were "offensive to our nation's veterans". As a child, Omar fled civil war in Somalia and spent four years in a Kenyan refugee camp.

In February 2021, Banks and a dozen other Republican House members skipped votes and enlisted others to vote for them, citing the ongoing COVID-19 pandemic. He and the other members were actually attending the Conservative Political Action Conference, which was held at the same time as their absences. In response, the Campaign for Accountability, an ethics watchdog group, filed a complaint with the House Committee on Ethics and requested an investigation into Banks and the other lawmakers.

In October 2021, Representative Liz Cheney, vice chair of the January 6th Committee, revealed that Banks had been sending letters to federal agencies, claiming to be the committee's ranking member even though he had been rejected from it. In one September 2021 letter, Banks requested that the Department of the Interior give him information it had sent the committee. He also wrote, "Pelosi refused to allow me to fulfill my duties as Ranking Member" and signed the letter as "Ranking Member", which he was not.

Also in October 2021, Business Insider reported that Banks had violated the Stop Trading on Congressional Knowledge (STOCK) Act of 2012, a federal transparency and conflict-of-interest law, by failing to properly disclose sales of stock in Kroger, Roblox, and Starbucks worth up to $45,000.

Also in October 2021, when Rachel Levine, who is transgender, became an admiral in the United States Public Health Service Commissioned Corps, Banks wrote in his official Twitter account: "The title of first female four-star officer gets taken by a man." Twitter, which at the time prohibited "targeted misgendering or deadnaming of transgender individuals", suspended his official account in response.

Shortly after Republicans retook control of the House of Representatives in the 2022 midterm elections, Banks ran for the position of Majority Whip, the third highest ranking position in the Republican caucus. He narrowly lost to Tom Emmer, 115–106.

In May 2023, Banks co-sponsored a resolution by Marjorie Taylor Greene to impeach Secretary of Homeland Security Alejandro Mayorkas.

=== Committee assignments ===
For the 118th Congress:

- Committee on Armed Services
  - Subcommittee on Military Personnel (chair)
  - Subcommittee on Strategic Forces
- Committee on Education and the Workforce
  - Subcommittee on Health, Employment, Labor, and Pensions
  - Subcommittee on Higher Education and Workforce Development
- Committee on Strategic Competition between the United States and the Chinese Communist Party

=== Caucus memberships ===
- Congressional Western Caucus
- Congressional Pakistan Caucus
- Republican Study Committee
- Congressional Taiwan Caucus

== U.S. Senate ==
=== 2024 Senate campaign ===
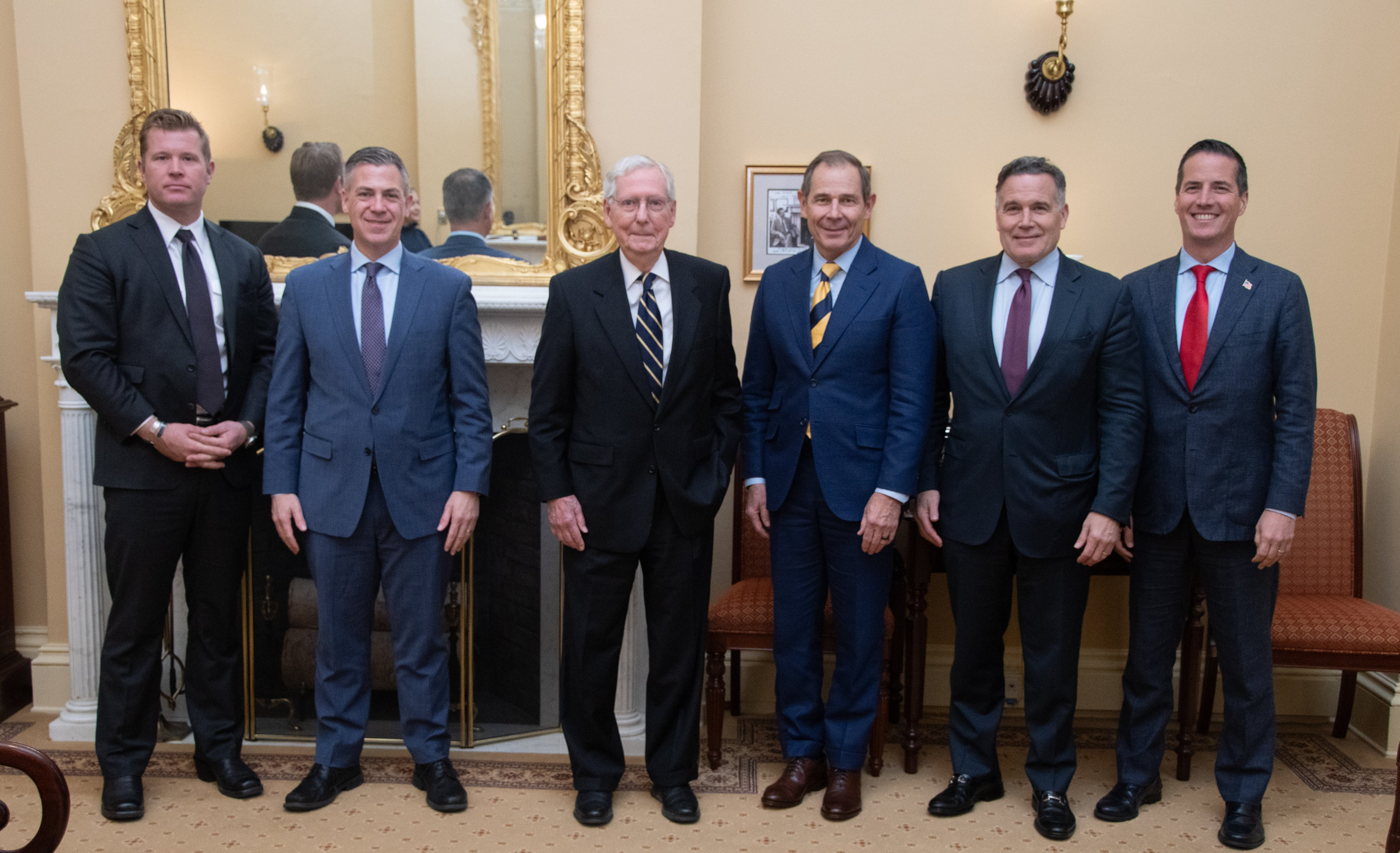
Banks with fellow incoming Republican senators meeting Sen. Mitch McConnell, November 2024

Incumbent senator Mike Braun announced he would not seek reelection. On January 17, 2023, Banks announced his candidacy for the U.S. Senate in 2024. He was endorsed by Donald Trump. Banks won the uncontested primary and defeated the Democratic nominee, Valerie McCray, in the general election, receiving 1,659,416 votes (58.64%).

=== Committee assignments ===
As listed on the Senate website:

- Committee on Armed Services
  - Subcommittee on Personnel
  - Subcommittee on Seapower
  - Subcommittee on Strategic Forces
- Committee on Banking, Housing, and Urban Affairs
  - Subcommittee on Economic Policy
  - Subcommittee on National Security and International Trade and Finance
  - Subcommittee on Securities, Insurance, and Investment
- Committee on Health, Education, Labor and Pensions
  - Subcommittee on Education and the American Family
  - Subcommittee on Employment and Workplace Safety
  - Subcommittee on Primary Health and Retirement Security
- Committee on Veterans' Affairs

== Political positions ==
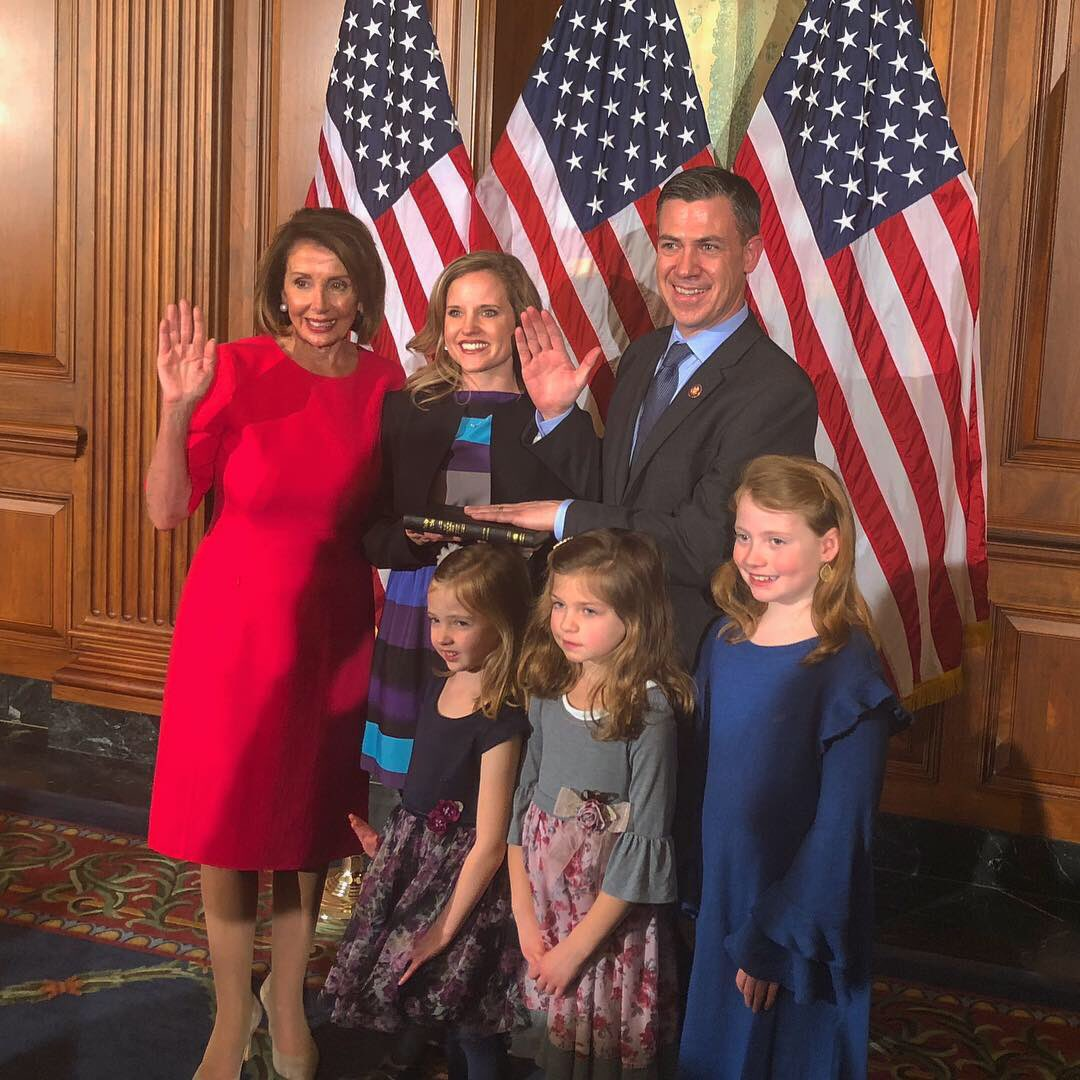
Banks with his wife and children being sworn in by Speaker Nancy Pelosi for the 116th Congress

Banks is politically conservative.

=== Student debt forgiveness ===
After the Biden administration announced a plan to forgive $10,000 in federal student debt and other provisions, Banks tweeted his opposition, writing, "Student loan forgiveness undermines one of our military's greatest recruitment tools at a time of dangerously low enlistments."

=== Health care ===
Banks supported repealing and replacing the Affordable Care Act (Obamacare). He voted for the American Health Care Act of 2017. He opposes single-payer healthcare, which he claims would cost taxpayers $32 trillion.

Banks unequivocally supports the Department of Government Efficiency's firings at the Department of Health and Human Services (HHS). In April 2025, he gained attention for his remarks to Mack Schroeder, a former HHS employee who confronted him after losing his job during the layoffs. Schroeder asked Banks: "There are many people who are not getting social service programs, especially people with disabilities. Are you going to do anything to stop what's happening?" Banks told Schroeder that he "probably deserved it", called him a "clown" and closed the elevator doors. The video of the incident went viral.

=== Immigration ===
Banks criticized President Biden's immigration policy and called on him to reinstate Trump-era policies.

=== Economy ===
In December 2017, Banks voted for the Tax Cuts and Jobs Act of 2017. Upon the bill's passage, Banks said it was "a good day for the future of the American dream".

In 2020, Banks voted against the Families First Coronavirus Response Act. In 2021, he voted against COVID-19 economic stimulus a second time.

=== Environment ===
In October 2016, Banks said, "I believe that climate change in this country is largely leftist propaganda to change the way Americans live and create more government obstruction and intrusion in our lives."

=== Abortion ===
Banks opposes abortion. He long opposed Roe v. Wade, and praised Dobbs, the 2022 decision that overturned it. The National Right to Life Committee, an organization dedicated to opposing abortion, gave him a 100% lifetime rating. In 2023, Banks voted for the Pain-Capable Unborn Child Protection Act. He opposes federal funding of abortions, as well as Planned Parenthood.

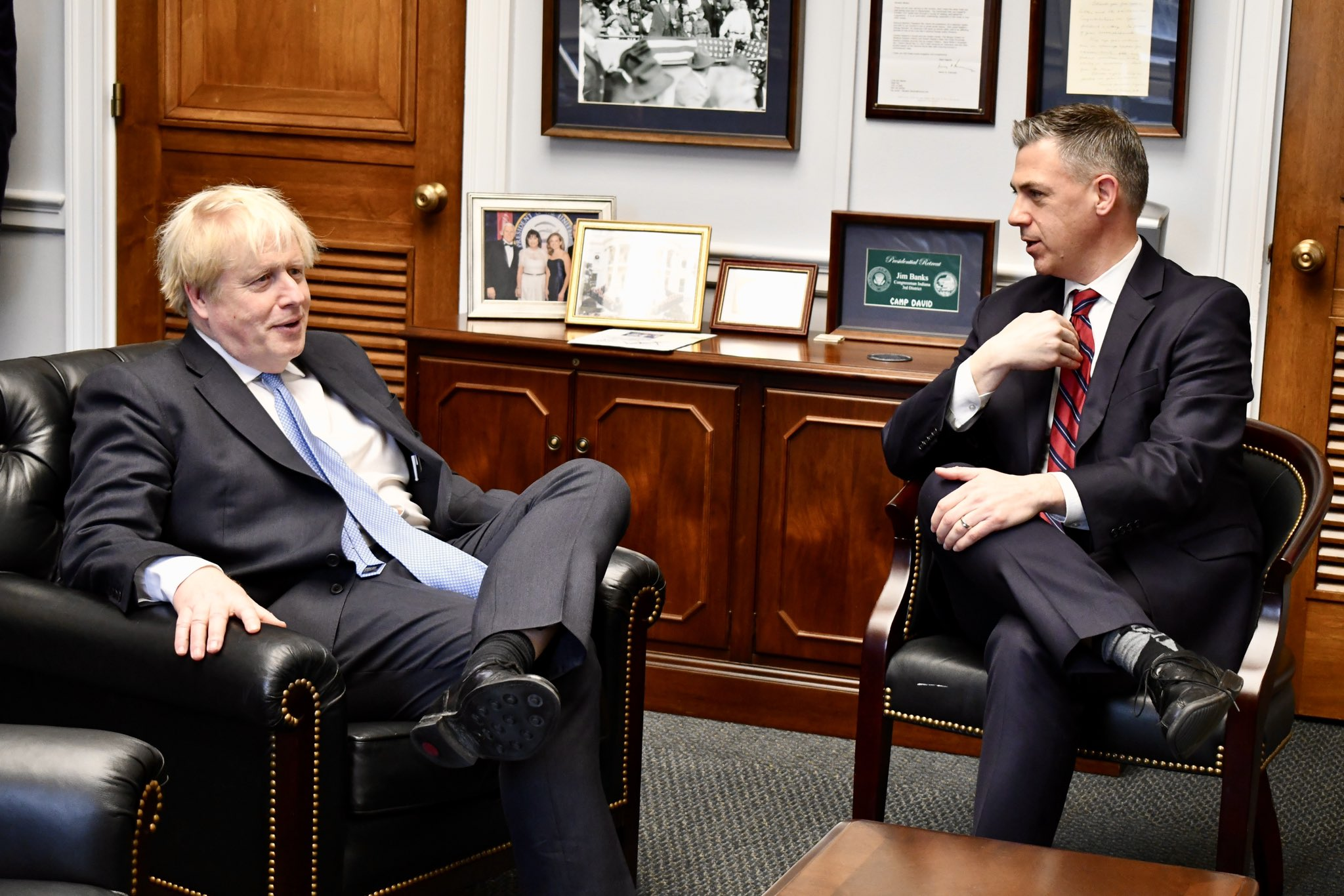
Jim Banks with then UK prime minister Boris Johnson

=== LGBT rights ===
Banks opposes same-sex marriage. In 2022, he voted against the Respect for Marriage Act, which repealed the Defense of Marriage Act and required the federal government, the states, and all territories to recognize the validity of same-sex marriages in the United States.

Banks has called banning transgender people from serving in the military an "emotional issue" due to Americans' polarized views on gender and the government's role in those issues. He opposes the military paying for sex reassignment surgery, saying, "I don't think taxpayers should be on the hook for that."

=== Big Tech ===
In June 2025, Banks spoke at the World.minds meeting in Washington, D.C. about China, AI, and the transatlantic relationship.

=== Foreign policy ===
On January 27, 2023, Banks reintroduced the MAHSA Act (H.R. 589), which sanctions Iran's leaders for terrorism activities and human rights violations after the nationwide uprising from the Mahsa Amini protests.

Banks voted to provide Israel with support following 2023 Hamas attack on Israel. In July 2025, he voted against two motions made by Senator Bernie Sanders to block arms sales to Israel.

=== Ukraine ===
In 2023, Banks voted for a moratorium on aid to Ukraine.

In 2023, Banks was among 98 Republicans to vote for a ban on cluster munitions to Ukraine.

=== Industry and workers ===
Banks has been a vocal critic of the Protecting the Right to Organize (PRO) Act, which seeks to expand labor protections and amend existing labor laws. He has said he is concerned that the bill would undermine "right-to-work" laws, compel workers to pay union dues regardless of membership, and broaden the definition of employees to include independent contractors. He has also argued that the legislation could allow undocumented workers to join unions, which he believes would diminish U.S. citizens' voting power in union matters. Banks proposed an amendment to prevent unions from recruiting undocumented workers, but it did not pass the House.

In December 2024, Banks announced his intention to steer Republican policy toward a more pro-worker and pro-American-industry stance, as outlined in his memo "Working Families First". In the memo, he calls for a shift in party focus away from Wall Street and toward supporting the working and middle classes. His suggested policy changes include expanding access to apprenticeships and technical training and increasing opportunities through Pell Grants to prepare people for the workforce.

Banks emphasizes the need for Republicans not to take America's working population for granted. He advocates a detailed strategy to incentivize domestic investment and enhance the U.S. industrial base, particularly in defense sectors.

== Electoral history ==
Indiana's 3rd Congressional District Election (2016)
Party	Candidate	Votes	%
Republican	Jim Banks	201,396	70.11
Democratic	Tommy Schrader	66,023	22.98
Libertarian	Pepper Snyder	19,828	6.90
Total votes		287,247	100.00
Turnout			58
Republican hold			

Indiana's 3rd Congressional District Election (2018)
Party	Candidate	Votes	%
Republican	Jim Banks (incumbent)	158,927	64.7
Democratic	Courtney Tritch	86,610	35.3
Total votes		245,537	100.0
Republican hold			

Indiana's 3rd congressional district, 2020
Party	Candidate	Votes	%
Republican	Jim Banks (incumbent)	220,989	67.8
Democratic	Chip Coldiron	104,762	32.2
Total votes		325,751	100.0
Republican hold			

Indiana's 3rd congressional district, 2022
Party	Candidate	Votes	%
Republican	Jim Banks (incumbent)	131,252	65.3
Democratic	Gary Snyder	60,312	30.0
Independent	Nathan Gotsch	9,354	4.7
Total votes		200,918	100.0
Republican hold			

2024 United States Senate election in Indiana
Party	Candidate	Votes	%	±%
Republican	Jim Banks	1,659,416	58.64%	+7.91%
Democratic	Valerie McCray	1,097,061	38.77%	−6.07%
Libertarian	Andrew Horning	73,233	2.59%	−1.83%
Write-in		187	0.00%	
Total votes		2,829,897	100.0%	
Republican hold				

U.S. House of Representatives
Preceded by Marlin Stutzman	Member of the U.S. House of Representatives from Indiana's 3rd congressional district 2017–2025	Succeeded by Marlin Stutzman
Party political offices
Preceded by Mike Johnson	Chair of the Republican Study Committee; 2021–2023	Succeeded by Kevin Hern
Preceded by Mike Braun	Republican nominee for U.S. Senator from Indiana (Class 1); 2024	Most recent
U.S. Senate
Preceded by Mike Braun	U.S. Senator (Class 1) from Indiana; 2025–present Served alongside: Todd Young	Incumbent
U.S. order of precedence (ceremonial)
Preceded by Bernie Moreno	Order of precedence of the United States as United States Senator	Succeeded by Elissa Slotkin
Preceded by Ruben Gallego	United States senators by seniority 88th	Succeeded by Lisa Blunt Rochester
