= Ted Budd =

American politician (born 1971)

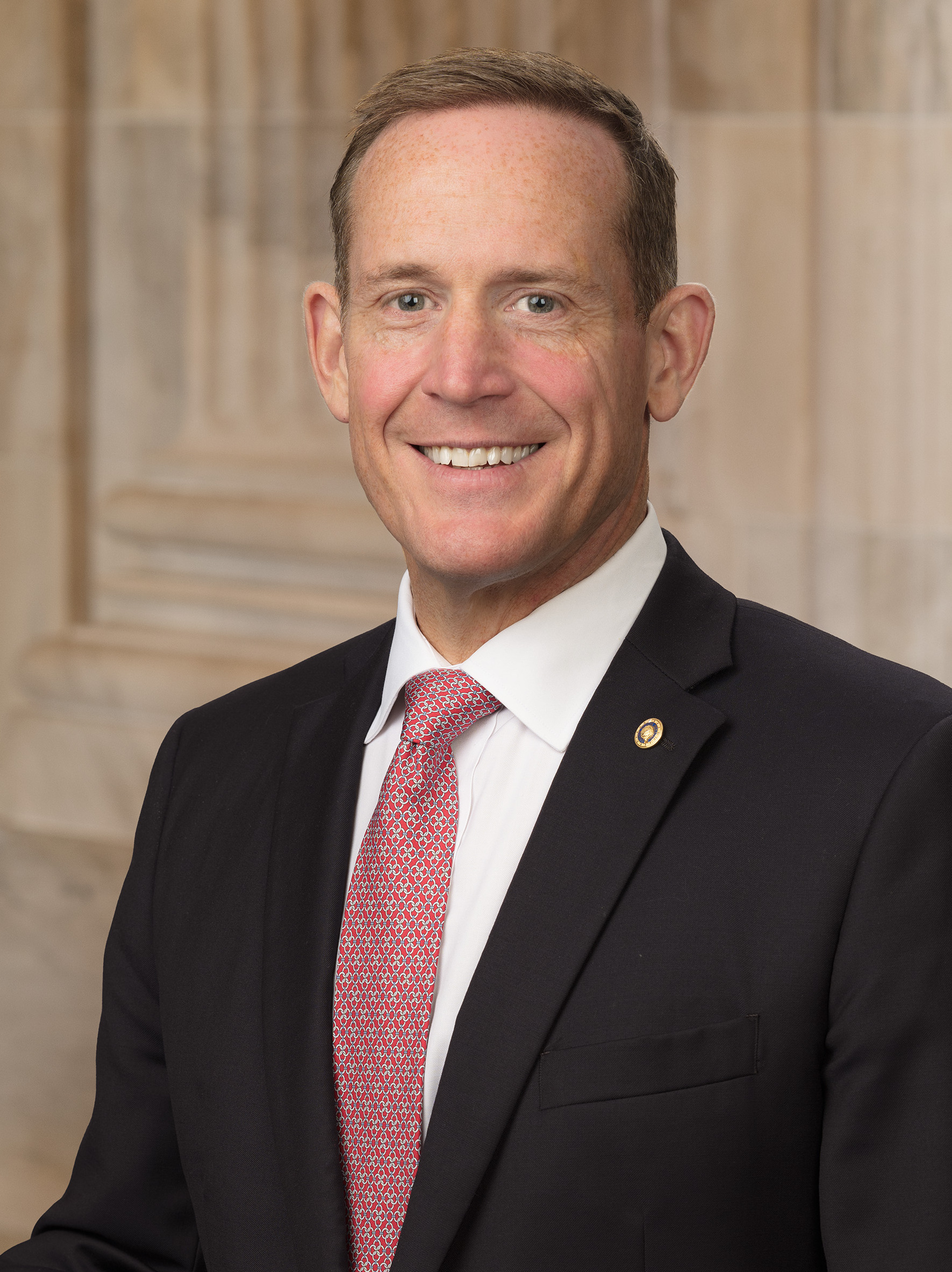
- Official portrait, 2023

United States Senator from North Carolina
- Incumbent
- Assumed office January 3, 2023 Serving with Thom Tillis
- Preceded by: Richard Burr

Member of the U.S. House of Representatives from North Carolina's 13th district
- In office January 3, 2017 – January 3, 2023
- Preceded by: George Holding
- Succeeded by: Wiley Nickel

Personal details
- Born: Theodore Paul Budd; October 21, 1971 (age 55) Winston-Salem, North Carolina, U.S.
- Party: Republican
- Spouse: Amy Kate Adams (m. 1994)
- Children: 3
- Education: Appalachian State University (BS); Dallas Theological Seminary (ThM); Wake Forest University (MBA)
- Website: Senate website Campaign website
- Budd's voice Budd questioning witnesses on the FAA and NOTAM failures. Recorded February 15, 2023

Theodore Paul Budd (born October 21, 1971) is an American businessman and politician serving since 2023 as the junior United States senator for North Carolina. A member of the Republican Party, he was the U.S. representative for North Carolina's 13th congressional district from 2017 to 2023.

Budd was first elected to the United States Senate in the 2022 election, defeating Democratic nominee Cheri Beasley to succeed Republican incumbent Richard Burr. Budd is set to become North Carolina's senior senator when Thom Tillis leaves office in January 2027.

== Early life and career ==
Theodore Paul Budd was born in Winston-Salem, North Carolina on October 21, 1971. When he was young, his family moved to a 300-acre (120 ha) farm on the Yadkin River in Davie County, outside Advance, where they raise cattle and chickens. His father, Richard, founded The Budd Group, a facility-services company, in 1963.

Budd attended Summit School, a private school in Winston-Salem, before attending Davie County High School, graduating in 1990. He then attended Appalachian State University, where received a Bachelor of Science in business administration in 1994. Budd later received a master of theology from the Dallas Theological Seminary in 1998 and a master of business administration from the Wake Forest University School of Business in 2007.

Budd owns a gun store in Rural Hall, North Carolina. The father of home-schooled children, he also served as a board member for North Carolinians for Home Education.

== U.S. House of Representatives ==
=== Elections ===
==== 2016 ====
Following court-mandated redistricting, the old 13th district essentially merged with the 2nd district. A new 13th district was created, stretching from the northern suburbs of Charlotte to Greensboro. The old 13th district's incumbent, Republican George Holding, opted to run in the 2nd district. Budd ran as one of 17 candidates in the ensuing Republican primary for the 13th district in the 2016 elections. His home had previously been in the 5th district but had been drawn into the 13th district.

With the help of the Club for Growth, which spent over $285,000 on his campaign, Budd won the primary with 20% of the vote. He defeated Bruce Davis, a former Guilford County commissioner, in the general election with 56.1% of the vote. He was sworn into office on January 3, 2017.

==== 2018 ====
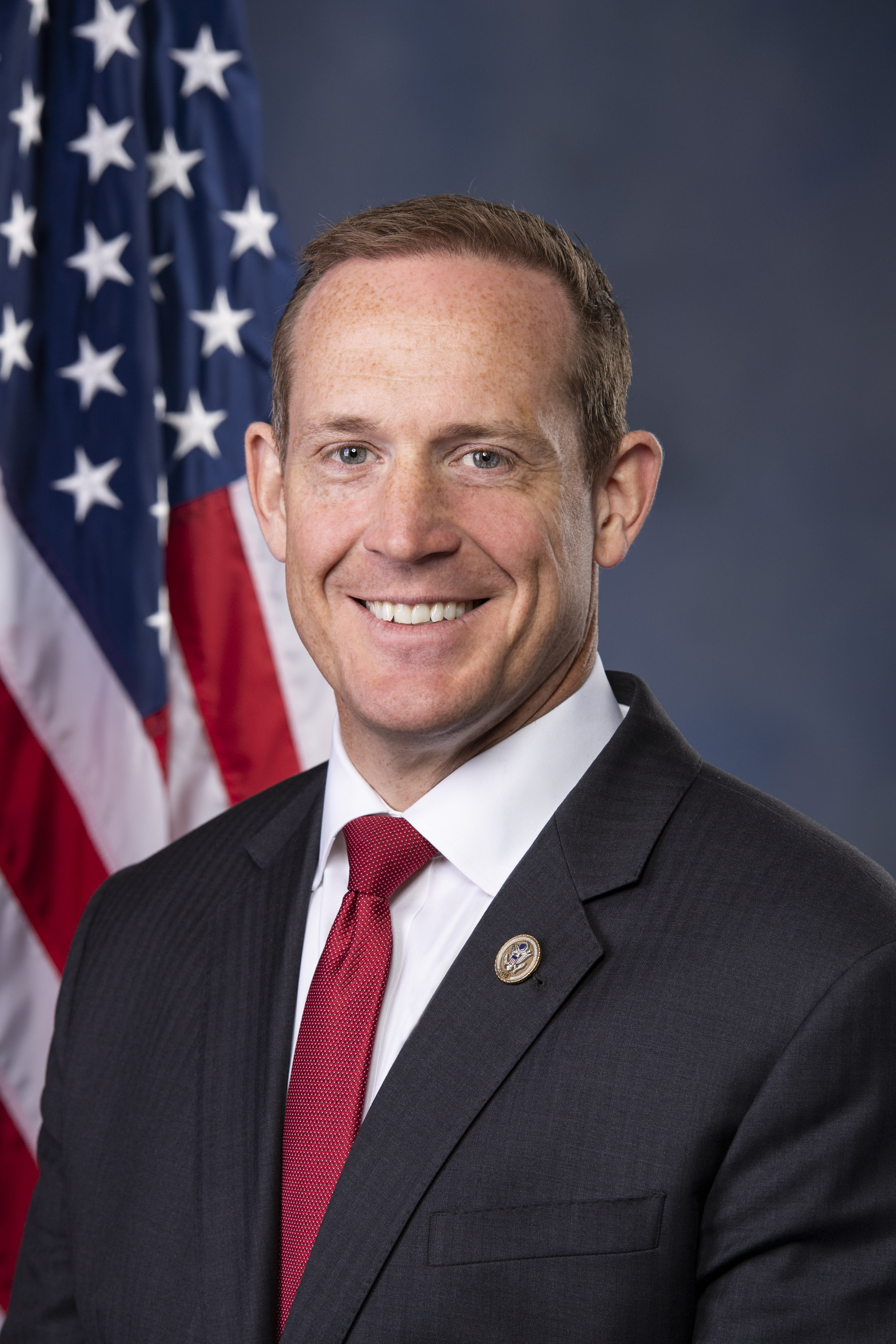
Budd during the 115th Congress

Budd was reelected in 2018, winning 51.5% to Kathy Manning's 45.8%. Manning was elected to represent the neighboring 6th district in 2020.

==== 2020 ====
In 2020, Budd was reelected with 68.2% of the vote defeating Democrat Scott Huffman, who won 31.8% of the vote.

=== House tenure ===
Budd voted for the Tax Cuts and Jobs Act of 2017 and numerous Defense Authorization Spending Bills during the Trump administration. He also voted for the United States-Mexico-Canada Trade Agreement, which he said would open up more markets for North Carolina agricultural products. He opposed the American Rescue Plan Act, the Build Back Better Act, and the Infrastructure, Investment, and Jobs Act under President Biden.

In late February 2021, Budd and a dozen other Republican House members skipped votes and enlisted others to vote in their place, citing the ongoing COVID-19 pandemic. He and the other members were actually attending the Conservative Political Action Conference, which was held at the same time as their slated absences. In response, the Campaign for Accountability, an ethics watchdog group, filed a complaint with the House Committee on Ethics and requested an investigation into Budd and the other lawmakers.

Budd was a member of the Freedom Caucus.

=== Committee assignments ===
- Committee on Financial Services
  - Subcommittee on Consumer Protection and Financial Institutions
  - Subcommittee on Diversity and Inclusion

=== Caucus memberships ===
- Freedom Caucus
- Republican Study Committee
- Senate Taiwan Caucus
- Task Force on Artificial Intelligence

== U.S. Senate ==
2022 North Carolina Senate election results by county: Ted Budd: 70–80%; 60–70%; 50–60%; 40–50%; Cheri Beasley: 80–90%; 60–70%; 50–60%

=== Elections ===
==== 2022 ====
On April 23, 2021, Budd went to Mar-a-Lago to discuss his prospective U.S. Senate candidacy with former U.S. President Donald Trump. On April 28, 2021, Budd announced his candidacy for the Class 3 Senate seat held by the retiring Richard Burr. At the Republican state convention in Greenville on June 5, Budd received the endorsements of Donald Trump and Trump's daughter-in-law, Lara Trump, who had declined to run for the seat. Former North Carolina Governor Pat McCrory said he would remain in the race despite Trump's endorsement. A third declared candidate, U.S. Representative Mark Walker, said he too would stay in the race, maintaining that he had won a straw poll of those attending the convention.

Budd won the Republican primary on May 17, 2022, with 58% of the vote, to McCrory's 25% and Walker's 9%. In the general election, Budd defeated Democratic nominee Cheri Beasley, the former chief justice of the North Carolina Supreme Court. Budd received 50.5% of the vote to Beasley's 47.3%, a margin of 3.2%.

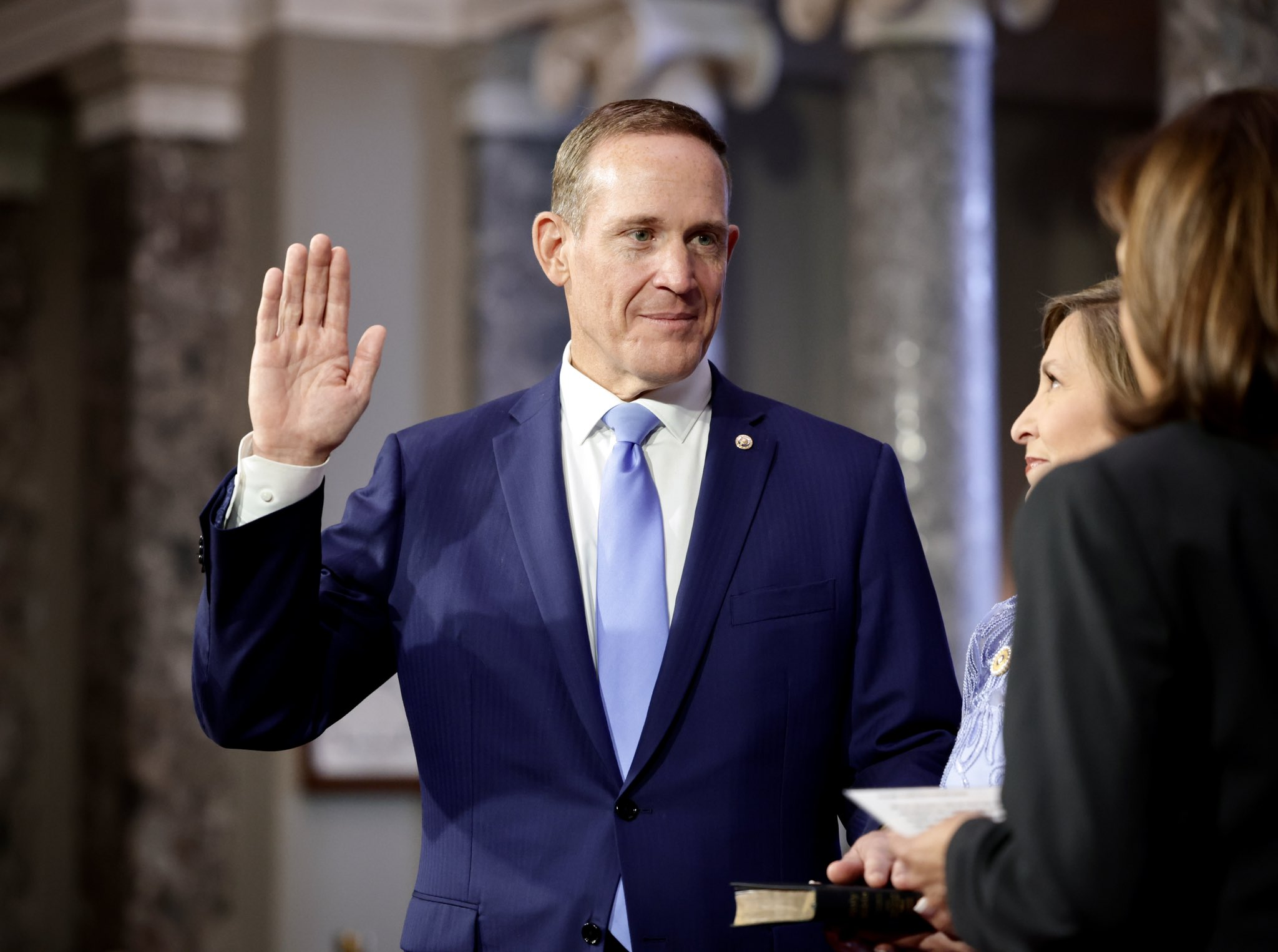
Budd being sworn in to the Senate by Vice President Kamala Harris, 2023

=== Senate tenure ===
At the convening of the 118th Congress on January 3, 2023, Budd was sworn in as North Carolina's junior U.S. Senator. He was one of five new Republican senators to take office that day.

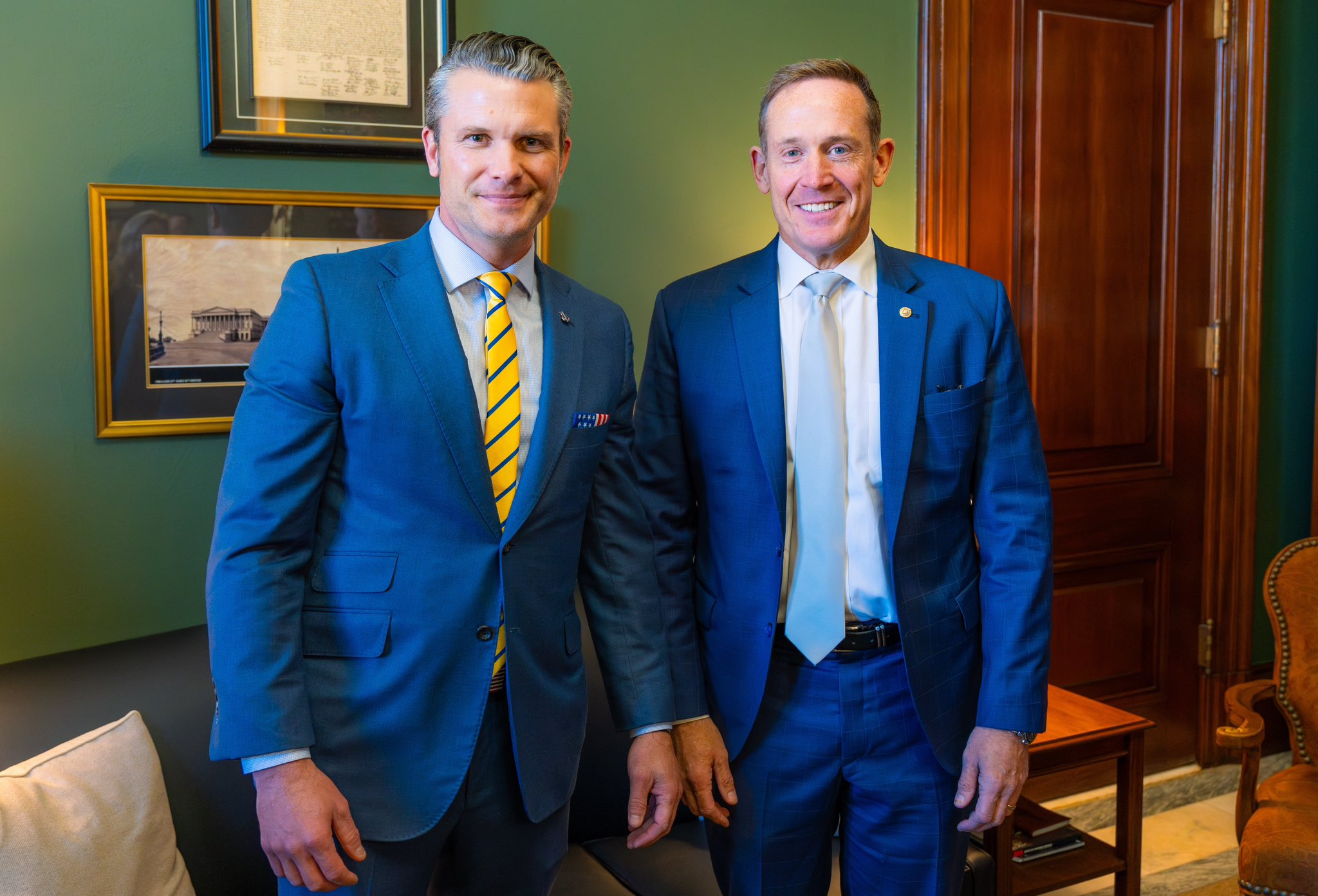
Budd with Secretary Pete Hegseth, 2025

In March 2023, Budd introduced the Seeing Objects at Altitude Regularly Act (SOAR), co-sponsored by Senator Mark Kelly, legislation that would require the Federal Aviation Administration to issue regulations within two years mandating equipping high-altitude balloons operating at 10,000 feet above sea level or higher with tracking systems to transmit location, altitude, and identity. The idea for the bill came after a Chinese-operated balloon crossed over the U.S. the previous month.

Committee assignments

- Committee on Armed Services
  - Subcommittee on Cybersecurity
  - Subcommittee on Emerging Threats and Capabilities
  - Subcommittee on Personnel
- Committee on Health, Education, Labor and Pensions
  - Subcommittee on Employment and Workplace Safety
  - Subcommittee on Primary Health and Retirement Security
- Committee on Commerce, Science, and Transportation
  - Subcommittee on Communications, Media, and Broadband
  - Subcommittee on Consumer Protection, Product Safety, and Data Security
  - Subcommittee on Surface Transportation, Maritime, Freight, and Ports
- Committee on Small Business and Entrepreneurship

Caucuses

- Senate Republican Conference

== Political positions ==
Budd is considered a staunch conservative. He is a strong ally of President Donald Trump.

=== Abortion ===
After Senator Lindsey Graham introduced legislation that would ban abortion nationwide after 15 weeks of pregnancy, Budd co-sponsored a House version of the bill with over 80 Republicans.

=== LGBTQ issues ===
In 2022, Budd voted against the Respect for Marriage Act, which requires states and the federal government to recognize the validity of same-sex and interracial marriages if they were legal in the jurisdiction where they were performed.

=== Affordable Care Act ===
Budd opposes the Affordable Care Act (also known as Obamacare) and voted to repeal it in 2017.

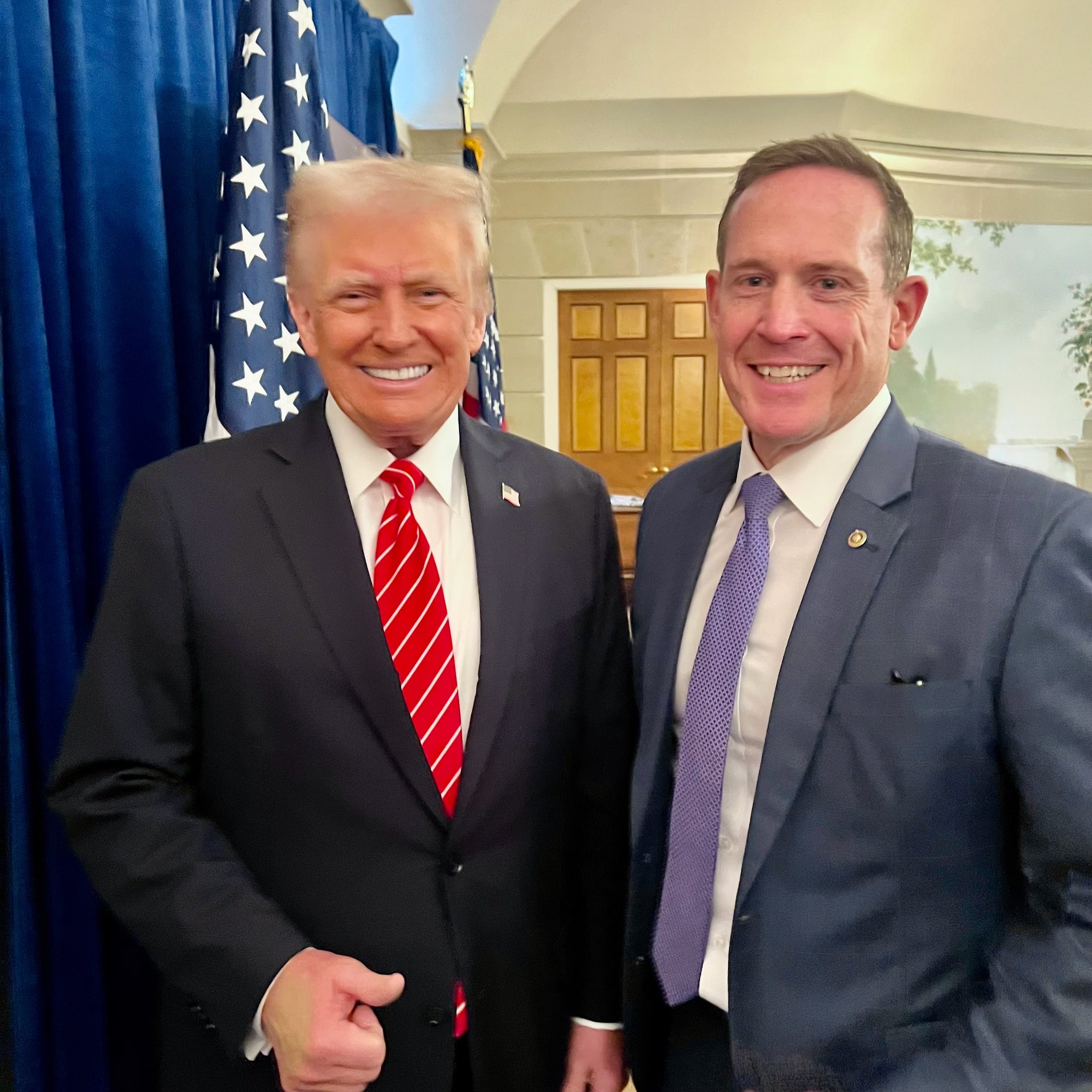
Budd with President Donald Trump

=== Voting rights and election integrity ===
Budd opposes the For the People Act, a Democratic bill intended to expand voting rights. Budd said that the bill undermines election integrity by expanding "no excuse" absentee voting and weakening voter ID requirements. He said that the bill would allow minors to vote. PolitiFact ruled this claim false, as the bill would only allow those under 18 to register to vote. Amendments to the bill that would lower the voting age to 16 failed in both 2019 and 2021.

=== Foreign policy ===
In 2020, Budd voted against the National Defense Authorization Act of 2021, which would prevent the president from withdrawing soldiers from Afghanistan without congressional approval.

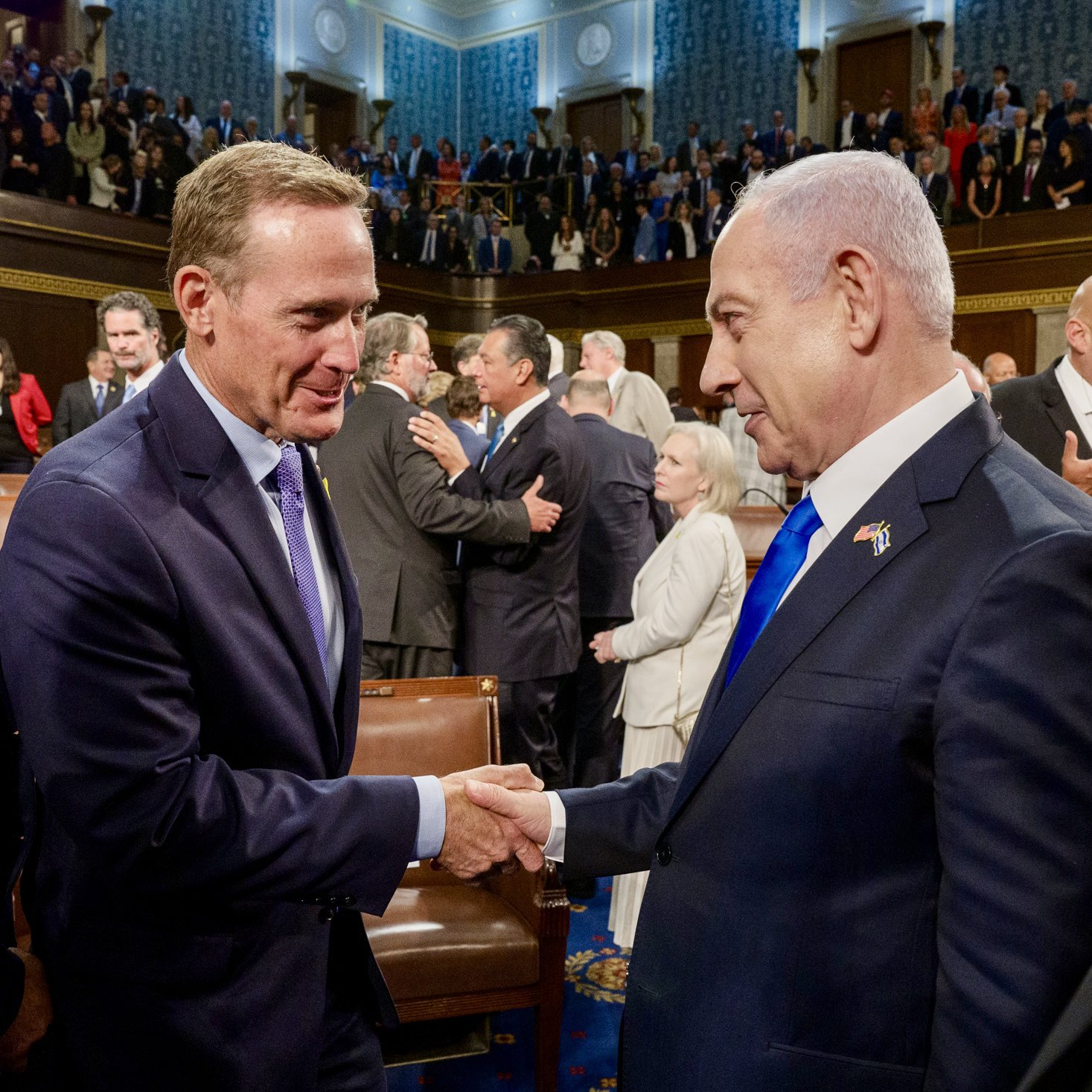
Budd with Prime Minister Benjamin Netanyahu in July 2024

In 2021, Budd was one of 14 Republican representatives to vote against a measure condemning the 2021 Myanmar coup d'état. In 2024, he visited Israel as a show of support after the October 7 attacks.

=== Antitrust bill ===
In 2022, Budd was one of 39 Republicans to vote for the Merger Filing Fee Modernization Act of 2021, an antitrust package that would crack down on corporations for anti-competitive behavior.

=== Fiscal Responsibility Act of 2023 ===
Budd was among the 31 Senate Republicans who voted against final passage of the Fiscal Responsibility Act of 2023.

=== Cybersecurity ===
In January 2025, Budd co-sponsored the Kids Off Social Media Act (KOSMA), which was introduced by Senators Brian Schatz, Chris Murphy, Ted Cruz, and Katie Britt. Senators John Curtis, Peter Welch, John Fetterman, Angus King, and Mark Warner also co-sponsored the Act, which would set a minimum age of 13 to use social media platforms and prevent social media companies from feeding "algorithmically targeted" content to users under 17.

== Personal life ==
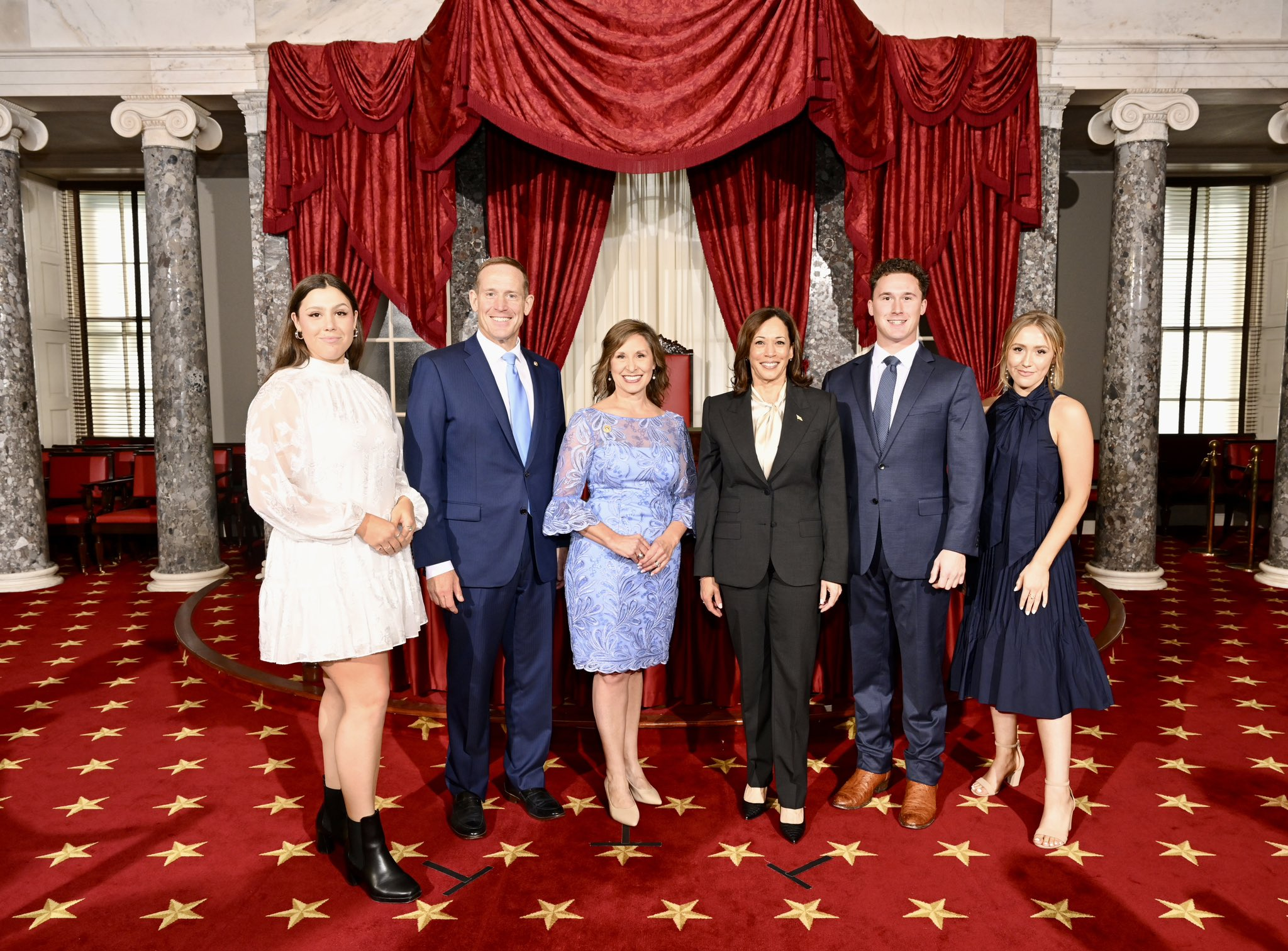
Budd family with Vice President Kamala Harris in January 2023

Budd met his wife, Amy Kate Adams, on a mission to the Soviet Union in 1991. They married in 1994 and have three children. The Budds live in Davie County on the farm where Budd was raised. They home-school their children and Budd serves as an assistant scoutmaster in his son's Boy Scout troop.

U.S. House of Representatives
Preceded by George Holding	Member of the U.S. House of Representatives from North Carolina's 13th congressional district 2017–2023	Succeeded by Wiley Nickel
Party political offices
Preceded by Richard Burr	Republican nominee for U.S. Senator from North Carolina (Class 3); 2022	Most recent
U.S. Senate
Preceded by Richard Burr	U.S. Senator (Class 3) from North Carolina; 2023–present Served alongside: Thom Tillis, Roy Cooper (elect)	Most recent
U.S. order of precedence (ceremonial)
Preceded by John Fetterman	Order of precedence of the United States as United States Senator	Succeeded by Peter Welch
Preceded by Peter Welch	United States senators by seniority 80th	Succeeded by John Fetterman
