= MAHSA Act =

Bill in the US congress

Mahsa Amini Human rights and Security Accountability Act (MAHSA Act) is a United States federal law that was enacted on April 24, 2024, as a bipartisan human rights and anti-terrorism legislation in the United States that, for the first time, imposes sanctions and holds accountable leaders of the Islamic Republic regime in Iran for their domestic suppression, crimes against humanity, and international terrorism.

The legislation was first introduced as a bill in the 117th Congress right at start of the Woman Life Freedom protests in Iran. Its intention is to put sanctions on the leaders of the Islamic Republic of Iran. The bill was reintroduced as H.R. 589 to the House of Representatives and as S.2626 to the US Senate in the 118th congress. This legislation was passed by the United States Congress on April 23, 2024, and signed into law by US President Joe Biden on April 24, 2024.

== Mahsa Amini ==
Mahsa Amini was a 22-year-old Iranian woman who while on vacation in Tehran, she was arrested and died from a collapse in court as shown by the surveillance footage, She died three days later in their custody. She was arrested for improperly wearing her compulsory hijab. Her name became the codename for the Woman Life Freedom revolution.

== Highlight of recent human rights abuses in Iran ==
Human rights abuses in Iran have been widely documented. They span from violation of the rights of ethnic minorities, women, LGBTQ communities, children, and religious minorities. As a result of these violations, the UN has had a special rapporteur since 1984. The current special rapporteur, Javaid Rehman is not allowed entry to Iran. In March 2023, Mr. Rehman expressed that, "The scale and gravity of the violations committed by Iranian authorities, especially since the death of Ms. Amini, points to the possible commission of international crimes, notably the crimes against humanity of murder, imprisonment, enforced disappearances, torture, rape and sexual violence, and persecution."

Moreover, the UN Human Rights Council has adopted resolution S35/1:

“On the deteriorating situation of human rights in the Islamic Republic of Iran, especially with respect to women and children, adopted on 24 November 2022, the Human Rights Council decided to establish an independent international fact-finding mission on the Islamic Republic of Iran."

From the start of the Woman Life Freedom Revolution in September 2022 until mid-January 2023, 522 protestors were killed, 70 of them children. Close to 20,000 people have been arrested and imprisoned. Many of the prisoners, including the two journalists who broke the news of Mahsa Amini's death, are still in prison. Activists, artists, actors were/ are serving sentences, including a rapper, Toomaj Salehi, who has been in solitary confinement for more than five months without having committed any crimes. Several prisoners have received death sentences with no access to proper council and several protesters have already been executed. Many detainees have been tormented by physical, psychological, and sexual torture.

More than 5000 schoolgirls were poisoned by chemical agents in organized, deliberate, distributed attacks spanning the whole country and affecting close to 100 schools between November 30, 2022, and March 16, 2023 . The full list of atrocities committed against the people of Iran are beyond the scope and focus of this page, but to list a few, the downing of the Ukrainian passenger airliner (PS-572), the Bloody Aban Massacre, and Iran's consistent ranking as the country with the highest executions per capita in the world.

== Highlight of the Islamic Republic's attacks, aggression, assassinations, and acts of terrorism ==
The first major act of terrorism linked to the Islamist group that later forms the Islamic Republic of Iran was the arson of Cinema Rex killing more than 377 people. The Islamic republic has conducted several terrorist attacks directly or through proxies; a select list of which are included in Iran and state-sponsored terrorism. According to the March 2023 testimony of General Lloyd Austin, there has been 83 Iran-backed proxy group attacks against Americans since President Joe Biden took office in 2021. The following is a list of Iran-backed proxy groups according to Council on Foreign Relations:

Country	Militia	Iranian Influence
Afghanistan	Taliban	Weak
Afghanistan	Fatimiyoun Brigade	Strong
Bahrain	Al Ashtar Brigades	Strong
Iraq	Kata'ib Hezbollah	Strong
Iraq	Badr Organization	Strong
Iraq	Asa'ib Ahl al-Haq	Strong
Lebanon	Hezbollah	Strong
Pakistan	Zainabiyoun	Strong
Palestinian Territories	Hamas	Weak
Palestinian Territories	Palestinian Islamic Jihad	Moderate
Palestinian Territories	Harakat al-Sabireen	Strong
Syria	Quwat al-Ridha	Strong
Syria	Baqir Brigade	Strong
Yemen	Houthi movement	Moderate

After the Iran hostage crisis, the Iran–United States relations deteriorated. The United States designated Iran's Quds Force, a branch of the Islamic Revolutionary Guards Corps (IRGC), as a terrorist organization under president Obama's administration before designating the entire IRGC as a terrorist organization under president Trump's administration. The Islamic Republic has committed conducted terrorist activities and assassinations and attempted terrorism and assassination plots in many countries including: Turkey, Greece, Thailand, Argentina, Germany, France, United Kingdom, and the US. Some of these assassination plots were targeting former senior US officials including the former Secretary of State, Mike Pompeo.

== MAHSA Act findings ==
The United States Congress has made the following determinations.

Congress found the following:

1. The Supreme Leader is an institution of the Islamic Republic of Iran.
2. The Supreme Leader holds ultimate authority over Iran's judiciary and security apparatus, including the Ministry of Intelligence and Security, law enforcement forces under the Interior Ministry, the Islamic Revolutionary Guard Corps (IRGC), and the Basij, a nationwide volunteer paramilitary group subordinate to the IRGC, all of which have engaged in human rights abuses in Iran. Additionally the IRGC, a United States designated Foreign Terrorist Organization, which reports to the Supreme Leader, continues to perpetrate terrorism around the globe, including attempts to kill and kidnap American citizens on United States soil.
3. The Supreme Leader appoints the head of Iran's judiciary. International observers continue to criticize the lack of independence of Iran's judicial system and maintained that trials disregarded international standards of fairness.
4. The revolutionary courts, created by Iran's former Supreme Leader Ruhollah Khomeini, within Iran's judiciary, are chiefly responsible for hearing cases of political offenses, operate in parallel to Iran's criminal justice system and routinely hold grossly unfair trials without due process, handing down predetermined verdicts and rubberstamping executions for political purpose.
5. The Iranian security and law enforcement forces engage in serious human rights abuse at the behest of the Supreme Leader.
6. Iran's president, Ebrahim Raisi, sits at the helm of the most sanctioned cabinet in Iranian history which includes internationally sanctioned rights violators. Raisi has supported the recent crackdown on protestors and is rights violator himself, having served on a "death commission" in 1988 that led to the execution of several thousand political prisoners in Iran. He most recently served as the head of Iran's judiciary, a position appointed by Iran's current Supreme Leader Ali Khamenei, and may likely be a potential candidate to replace Khamenei as Iran's next Supreme Leader.
7. On September 16, 2022, 22-year-old woman, Mahsa Amini, died in the detention of the Morality Police after being beaten and detained for allegedly transgressing discriminatory dress codes for women. This tragic incident triggered widespread, pro-women's rights, pro-democracy protests across all of Iran's 31 provinces, calling for the end to Iran's theocratic regime.
8. In the course of the protests, the Iranian security forces’ violent crackdown includes mass arrests, well documented beating of protestors, throttling of the internet and telecommunications services, and shooting protestors with live ammunition. Five weeks into the protests, Iranian security forces have reportedly killed hundreds of protestors and other civilians, including women and children, and wounded many more.
9. Iran's Supreme Leader is the leader of the "Axis of Resistance", which is a network of Tehran's terror proxy and partner militias material supported by the Islamic Revolutionary Guard Corps that targets the United States as well as its allies and partners.

== Sanctions listed ==
MAHSA Act will require the President of the United States to annually determine whether the following sanctions apply to entities and individual:

- Sanctions described in section 105(c) of the Comprehensive Iran Sanctions, Accountability, and Divestment Act of 2010 (22 U.S.C. 8514(c)).
- Sanctions applicable with respect to a person pursuant to Executive Order 13553 (50 U.S.C. 1701 note; relating to blocking property of certain persons with respect to serious human rights abuses by the Government of Iran).
- Sanctions applicable with respect to a person pursuant to Executive Order 13224 (50 U.S.C. 1701 note; relating to blocking property and prohibiting transactions with persons who commit, threaten to commit, or support terrorism).
- Sanctions applicable with respect to a person pursuant to Executive Order 13818 (relating to blocking the property of persons involved in serious human rights abuse or corruption).
- Sanctions applicable with respect to a person pursuant to Executive Order 13876 (relating to imposing sanctions with respect to Iran).
- Penalties and visa bans applicable with respect to a person pursuant to section 7031(c) of the Department of State, Foreign Operations, and Related Programs Appropriations Act, 2021.
- The Supreme Leader of Iran and any official in the Office of the Supreme Leader of Iran.
- The President of Iran and any official in the Office of the President of Iran or the President's cabinet, including cabinet ministers and executive vice presidents.
- Any entity, including foundations and economic conglomerates, overseen by the Office of the Supreme Leader of Iran which is complicit in financing or resourcing of human rights abuses or support for terrorism.
- Any official of any entity owned or controlled by the Supreme Leader of Iran or the Office of the Supreme Leader of Iran.
- Any person determined by the Secretary of the Treasury, in consultation with or at the recommendation of the Secretary of State—
  - to be a person appointed by the Supreme Leader of Iran, the Office of the Supreme Leader of Iran, the President of Iran, or the Office of the President of Iran to a position as a state official of Iran, or as the head of any entity located in Iran or any entity located outside of Iran that is owned or controlled by one or more entities in Iran
  - to have materially assisted, sponsored, or provided financial, material, or technological support for, or goods or services to or in support of any person whose property and interests in property are blocked pursuant to this section;
  - to be owned or controlled by, or to have acted or purported to act for or on behalf of, directly or indirectly any person whose property and interests in property are blocked pursuant to this section; or
  - to be a member of the board of directors or a senior executive officer of any person whose property and interests in property are blocked pursuant to this section.

== Bill supporters ==
MAHSA Act was drafted by Xiyue Wang and introduced by congressman Jim Banks, and as of June 22, 2023, it has 128 cosponsors (60 Democrats, and 68 Republicans). The bill has received lots of grassroots advocacy including call campaigns, Tweets, representative town hall attendance, and politician visitations by the Iranian-American citizens, communities, and allies. It has been endorsed by National Union for Democracy in Iran (NUFDI), the Public Affairs Alliance of Iranian Americans (PAAIA), National Solidarity Group of Iran, Alliance for the Rights of all Minorities (ARAM), Iran Working Group of the International Religious Freedom Roundtable, the International Organization to Preserve Human Rights (IOPHR), the Cyrus Forum, the American Israel Public Affairs Committee (AIPAC), and United Against Nuclear Iran (UANI).

== House Foreign Affairs Committee mark-up session ==
The bill was marked-up by the House Foreign Affairs Committee on Wednesday, April 26, 2023. It passed the committee with unanimous consent voice vote with an amendment from Representative Cory Mills. On June 22, 2023, the bill was reported by the House Foreign Affairs Committee and placed on the Union Calendar to be voted on the House floor.

== House floor vote ==
HR 589 was considered under suspension of rules and passed the House floor with overwhelming majority of the representatives voting for it. 410 representatives voted for the MAHSA Act (209 Republicans and 201 Democrats), Representatives Ilhan Omar, Thomas Massie, and Cori Bush voted against the bill, and 20 representatives did not vote on the bill.

== Senate companion bill (S. 2626 of 118th Congress) ==
MAHSA Act's Senate companion bill was introduced to the Senate by Senators Marco Rubio and Alex Padilla on 7/27/2023. According to the Iran International, Senator Ben Cardin was holding up MAHSA Act from being considered for a markup session by the United States Senate Committee on Foreign Relations. However, with continued advocacy of mostly the Iranian-American community, it was scheduled for a marked-up on April 16, 2024.

On April 16, 2024, the Senate Committee on Foreign Relations marked up the Senate bill with amendments by Senators Schatz, Murphy, and Cardin, which significantly weakened the legislation. These amendments removed provisions that would hold the regime in Iran accountable for its past human rights violations, introduced a four-year sunset clause, expanded sanction exceptions, and added additional sanction waivers. Many human rights activists and Iranian American groups expressed strong dissatisfaction with these changes, particularly the broad sanction exceptions that could limit the bill's enforcement and create loopholes.

Senator Cardin faced sharp criticism for undermining human rights commitments by excluding accountability for past human rights violations of the regime in Iran and limiting it to future offenses. The weakening of the bill sparked outrage among human rights activists, who voiced their concerns on social media. As a result of these fundamental changes, human rights activists and Iranian American groups urged Congress to advance the House version of the bill instead.

== Bill passage ==
The MAHSA Act (the same version that had previously passed the House) was incorporated in the 21st Century Peace through Strength Act which was passed with a bipartisan and overwhelming majority of the Representatives (360 Yea to 58 Nay) on April 20, 2024. It passed in the Senate on April 23, 2024, as a part of the 21st Century Peace through Strength Act package which passed as a part of the National Security Act, 2024 and signed into law by President Joseph Biden in April 2024.
