= United States Senate Health Subcommittee on Primary Health and Retirement Security =

The Senate Subcommittee on Primary Health & Retirement Security is one of the three subcommittees within the Senate Committee on Health

== Jurisdiction ==
The Subcommittee has oversight over many aging issues including: The Older Americans Act - including home delivered and congregate meals programs for older adults, the Senior Community Services Employment Program, long-term services and supports, elder abuse, neglect, and scams affecting seniors, and the health of the aging population, including Alzheimer's disease and family care-giving. The Subcommittee also has oversight over many Primary Health issues including Community Health Centers, access to vaccines, oral health, prescription drugs and the mental health of all Americans.

== Members, 119th Congress ==
Majority	Minority
Roger Marshall, Kansas, Chair; Rand Paul, Kentucky; Susan Collins, Maine; Lisa Murkowski, Alaska; Josh Hawley, Missouri; Jim Banks, Indiana; Jon Husted, Ohio; Ashley Moody, Florida; Alan Armstrong, Oklahoma	Ed Markey, Massachusetts; Patty Murray, Washington; Tammy Baldwin, Wisconsin; Chris Murphy, Connecticut; Maggie Hassan, New Hampshire; John Hickenlooper, Colorado; Andy Kim, New Jersey; Lisa Blunt Rochester, Delaware
Ex officio
Bill Cassidy, Louisiana	Bernie Sanders, Vermont

== Historical subcommittee rosters ==
=== 117th Congress ===
Majority	Minority
Bernie Sanders, Vermont, Chair; Bob Casey, Pennsylvania; Tammy Baldwin, Wisconsin; Chris Murphy, Connecticut; Tim Kaine, Virginia; Maggie Hassan, New Hampshire; Jacky Rosen, Nevada; Ben Ray Luján, New Mexico	Susan Collins, Maine, Ranking Member; Rand Paul, Kentucky; Lisa Murkowski, Alaska; Roger Marshall, Kansas; Tim Scott, South Carolina; Jerry Moran, Kansas; Bill Cassidy, Louisiana; Mike Braun, Indiana
Ex officio
Patty Murray, Washington	Richard Burr, North Carolina

=== 118th Congress ===
Majority	Minority
Ed Markey, Massachusetts; Patty Murray, Washington; Tammy Baldwin, Wisconsin; Chris Murphy, Connecticut; Maggie Hassan, New Hampshire; Tina Smith, Minnesota; Ben Ray Luján, New Mexico; John Hickenlooper, Colorado	Roger Marshall, Kansas Ranking Member; Rand Paul, Kentucky; Susan Collins, Maine; Lisa Murkowski, Alaska; Mike Braun, Indiana; Markwayne Mullin, Oklahoma; Ted Budd, North Carolina
Ex officio
Bernie Sanders, Vermont	Bill Cassidy, Louisiana
