= United States Senate Committee on Health, Education, Labor and Pensions =

Standing committee of the United States Senate

Senate Health, Education, Labor and Pensions Committee
Standing
- Active United States Senate; 119th Congress

History
- Formed: January 28, 1869

Leadership
- Chair: Bill Cassidy (R); Since January 3, 2025
- Ranking Member: Bernie Sanders (I); Since January 3, 2025

Structure
- Seats: 23
- Political parties: Majority (11): Republican (11); Minority (10): Democratic (9); Independent (1)

Jurisdiction
- Oversight authority: Department of Education, Department of Health and Human Services, Department of Labor
- House counterpart: House Committee on Education and Labor

Meeting place
- 428 Senate Dirksen Office Building, Washington, D.C.

Website
- help.senate.gov

Rules
- Rule XXV.1.(m), Standing Rules of the Senate; Rules of Procedure U.S. Senate Committee on the Judiciary

The United States Senate Committee on Health, Education, Labor and Pensions (HELP) generally considers these major social policy issues. Its jurisdiction also extends beyond these issues to include several more specific areas, as defined by Senate rules.

== History ==
While it is currently known as the HELP Committee, the committee was originally founded on January 28, 1869, as the Committee on Education. Its name was changed to the Committee on Education and Labor on February 14, 1870, when petitions relating to labor were added to its jurisdiction from the Committee on Naval Affairs.

The committee's jurisdiction at the end of the 19th and early 20th centuries focused largely on issues relating to federal employees’ working conditions and federal education aid. Prominent action considered by the committee in the 1910s and 1920s included the creation of a national minimum wage, the establishments of a Department of Labor, a Department of Education, and a Children's Bureau. During the 1930s, the committee took action on the National Labor Relations Act, the Walsh–Healey Public Contracts Act of 1936 and the Fair Labor Standards Act of 1938.

In 1944, the jurisdiction of the Public Health Service was transferred from the Commerce Committee to the Committee on Education and Labor, adding issues relating to public health matters to its jurisdiction. The committee's name was changed during the 80th Congress to the Committee on Labor and Public Welfare as part of the Legislative Reorganization Act of 1946 (Public Law 79-601). The act further expanded the committee's oversight to include the rehabilitation, health, and education of veterans. Mine safety was also added to the committee's jurisdiction in 1949.

During the Administration of President Lyndon B. Johnson, the committee took the lead in shaping legislation as part of Johnson's War on Poverty, resulting in the Economic Opportunity Act of 1964. Through the Legislative Reorganization Act of 1970 (Public Law 91-510), certain issues pertaining to veterans were transferred to the newly created Committee on Veterans Affairs. In the 95th Congress, the Senate passed S. Res. 4, which renamed the committee to be the Committee on Human Resources. However, the name was again changed in the 96th Congress by S. Res. 30 to the Committee on Labor and Human Resources. On March 18, 1992, the committee's jurisdiction was updated to include all of the areas listed below. The committee was given its current name, the Committee on Health, Education, Labor and Pensions, on January 19, 1999, by S. Res. 20.

On July 25, 2024, the committee voted 16–4 to issue its first-ever subpoena, compelling the testimony of Steward Health Care's CEO Ralph de la Torre in relation to accusations of mismanagement of the health system.

== Jurisdictional areas ==
Under the Rule 25 of the Standing Rules of the Senate, the following subject matters fall under the jurisdiction of the Committee:

- Measures relating to education, labor, health, and public welfare
- Aging
- Agricultural colleges
- Arts and humanities
- Biomedical research and development
- Child labor
- Convict labor and the entry of goods made by convicts into interstate commerce
- Domestic activities of the American Red Cross
- Equal employment opportunity
- Gallaudet University, Howard University, and St. Elizabeths Hospital in Washington, D.C.
- Individuals with disabilities
- Labor standards and labor statistics
- Mediation and arbitration of labor disputes
- Occupational Safety and Health Administration, including the welfare of miners.
- Mine Safety and Health Administration
- Private pension plans
- Public health
- Railway labor and retirement
- Regulation of foreign laborers
- Student loans
- Wages and hours of labor, including the federal minimum wage

== Members, 119th Congress ==
Majority	Minority
Bill Cassidy, Louisiana, Chair; Rand Paul, Kentucky; Susan Collins, Maine; Lisa Murkowski, Alaska; Roger Marshall, Kansas; Tim Scott, South Carolina; Josh Hawley, Missouri; Tommy Tuberville, Alabama; Jim Banks, Indiana; Jon Husted, Ohio; Ashley Moody, Florida; Alan Armstrong, Oklahoma	Bernie Sanders, Vermont Ranking Member; Patty Murray, Washington; Tammy Baldwin, Wisconsin; Chris Murphy, Connecticut; Tim Kaine, Virginia; Maggie Hassan, New Hampshire; John Hickenlooper, Colorado; Ed Markey, Massachusetts; Andy Kim, New Jersey; Lisa Blunt Rochester, Delaware; Angela Alsobrooks, Maryland

== Subcommittees ==
Subcommittee	Chair	Ranking Member
Education and the American Family	Tommy Tuberville (R-AL)	Lisa Blunt Rochester (D-DE)
Employment and Workplace Safety	Markwayne Mullin (R-OK) (until March 23, 2026); Jim Banks (R-IN) (from April 22, 2026)	John Hickenlooper (D-CO)
Primary Health and Retirement Security	Roger Marshall (R-KS)	Ed Markey (D-MA)

== Historical members ==
=== 110th Congress ===
Majority	Minority
Ted Kennedy, Massachusetts, Chair; Chris Dodd, Connecticut, Vice Chair; Tom Harkin, Iowa; Barbara Mikulski, Maryland; Jeff Bingaman, New Mexico; Patty Murray, Washington; Jack Reed, Rhode Island; Hillary Clinton, New York; Bernie Sanders, Vermont; Sherrod Brown, Ohio; Barack Obama, Illinois, until November 16, 2008	Mike Enzi, Wyoming, Ranking Member; Judd Gregg, New Hampshire; Lamar Alexander, Tennessee; Richard Burr, North Carolina; Johnny Isakson, Georgia; Lisa Murkowski, Alaska; Orrin Hatch, Utah; Pat Roberts, Kansas; Wayne Allard, Colorado; Tom Coburn, Oklahoma

Subcommittee	Chair	Ranking Member
Subcommittee on Children and Families	Chris Dodd (D-CT)	Lamar Alexander (R-TN)
Subcommittee on Employment and Workplace Safety	Patty Murray (D-WA)	Johnny Isakson (R-GA)
Subcommittee on Retirement and Aging	Barbara Mikulski (D-MD)	Richard Burr (R-NC)

=== 111th Congress ===
The Committee was chaired by Democrat Ted Kennedy of Massachusetts until his death on August 25, 2009. Under seniority rules, Acting Chair Christopher Dodd was next in line, but Dodd chose instead to remain chair of the Senate Banking Committee. Tom Harkin, next in line by seniority, assumed the chair on September 9, 2009, vacating his post as chair of the Senate Agriculture Committee. Republican Mike Enzi of Wyoming continued to serve as Ranking Member.

Majority	Minority
Ted Kennedy, Massachusetts, Chair until June 9, 2009; Tom Harkin, Iowa, Chair from September 9, 2009; Chris Dodd, Connecticut, Acting Chair from June 9, 2009 – September 9, 2009; Barbara Mikulski, Maryland; Jeff Bingaman, New Mexico; Patty Murray, Washington; Jack Reed, Rhode Island; Bernie Sanders, Vermont; Bob Casey, Pennsylvania; Kay Hagan, North Carolina; Jeff Merkley, Oregon; Al Franken, Minnesota, from June 7, 2009; Michael Bennet, Colorado; Carte Goodwin, West Virginia, July 2010 – November 2010; Joe Manchin, West Virginia, from November 2010	Mike Enzi, Wyoming, Ranking Member; Judd Gregg, New Hampshire; Lamar Alexander, Tennessee; Richard Burr, North Carolina; Johnny Isakson, Georgia; John McCain, Arizona; Orrin Hatch, Utah; Lisa Murkowski, Alaska; Tom Coburn, Oklahoma; Pat Roberts, Kansas

Source: 2010 Congressional Record, Vol. 156, Page S6226 ,

Subcommittee	Chair	Ranking Member
Subcommittee on Children and Families	Chris Dodd (D-CT)	Lamar Alexander (R-TN)
Subcommittee on Employment and Workplace Safety	Patty Murray (D-WA)	Johnny Isakson (R-GA)
Subcommittee on Retirement and Aging	Barbara Mikulski (D-MD)	Richard Burr (R-NC)

=== 112th Congress ===
Majority	Minority
Tom Harkin, Iowa, Chair; Barbara Mikulski, Maryland; Jeff Bingaman, New Mexico; Patty Murray, Washington; Bernie Sanders, Vermont; Bob Casey Jr., Pennsylvania; Kay Hagan, North Carolina; Jeff Merkley, Oregon; Al Franken, Minnesota; Michael Bennet, Colorado; Sheldon Whitehouse, Rhode Island; Richard Blumenthal, Connecticut	Mike Enzi, Wyoming, Ranking Member; Lamar Alexander, Tennessee; Richard Burr, North Carolina; Johnny Isakson, Georgia; Rand Paul, Kentucky; Orrin Hatch, Utah; John McCain, Arizona; Pat Roberts, Kansas; Lisa Murkowski, Alaska; Mark Kirk, Illinois

Source: 2011 Congressional Record, Vol. 157, Page S557

Subcommittee	Chair	Ranking Member
Subcommittee on Children and Families	Barbara Mikulski (D-MD)	Richard Burr (R-NC)
Subcommittee on Employment and Workplace Safety	Patty Murray (D-WA)	Johnny Isakson (R-GA)
Subcommittee on Primary Health and Aging	Bernie Sanders (I-VT)	Rand Paul (R-KY)

=== 113th Congress ===
Majority	Minority
Tom Harkin, Iowa, Chair; Barbara Mikulski, Maryland; Patty Murray, Washington; Bernie Sanders, Vermont; Bob Casey Jr., Pennsylvania; Kay Hagan, North Carolina; Al Franken, Minnesota; Michael Bennet, Colorado; Sheldon Whitehouse, Rhode Island; Tammy Baldwin, Wisconsin; Chris Murphy, Connecticut; Elizabeth Warren, Massachusetts	Lamar Alexander, Tennessee, Ranking member; Mike Enzi, Wyoming; Richard Burr, North Carolina; Johnny Isakson, Georgia; Rand Paul, Kentucky; Orrin Hatch, Utah; Pat Roberts, Kansas; Lisa Murkowski, Alaska; Mark Kirk, Illinois; Tim Scott, South Carolina

Source: 2013 Congressional Record, Vol. 159, Page S296 to 297

Subcommittee	Chair	Ranking Member
Children and Families	Kay Hagan (D-NC)	Michael Enzi (R-WY)
Employment and Workplace Safety	Bob Casey (D-PA)	Johnny Isakson (R-GA)
Primary Health and Aging	Bernie Sanders (I-VT)	Richard Burr (R-NC)

=== 114th Congress ===
Majority	Minority
Lamar Alexander, Tennessee, Chair; Mike Enzi, Wyoming; Richard Burr, North Carolina; Johnny Isakson, Georgia; Rand Paul, Kentucky; Susan Collins, Maine; Lisa Murkowski, Alaska; Mark Kirk, Illinois; Tim Scott, South Carolina; Orrin Hatch, Utah; Pat Roberts, Kansas; Bill Cassidy, Louisiana	Patty Murray, Washington, Ranking Member; Barbara Mikulski, Maryland; Bernie Sanders, Vermont; Bob Casey Jr., Pennsylvania; Al Franken, Minnesota; Michael Bennet, Colorado; Sheldon Whitehouse, Rhode Island; Tammy Baldwin, Wisconsin; Chris Murphy, Connecticut; Elizabeth Warren, Massachusetts

Source: 2015 Congressional Record, Vol. 161, Page S67 to 68

Subcommittee	Chair	Ranking Member
Children and Families	Rand Paul (R-KY)	Bob Casey Jr. (D-PA)
Employment and Workplace Safety	Johnny Isakson (R-GA)	Al Franken (D-MN)
Primary Health and Retirement Security	Mike Enzi (R-WY)	Bernie Sanders (I-VT)

=== 115th Congress ===
Majority	Minority
Lamar Alexander, Tennessee, Chair; Mike Enzi, Wyoming; Richard Burr, North Carolina; Johnny Isakson, Georgia; Rand Paul, Kentucky; Susan Collins, Maine; Bill Cassidy, Louisiana; Todd Young, Indiana; Orrin Hatch, Utah; Pat Roberts, Kansas; Lisa Murkowski, Alaska; Tim Scott, South Carolina	Patty Murray, Washington, Ranking Member; Bernie Sanders, Vermont; Bob Casey Jr., Pennsylvania; Michael Bennet, Colorado; Al Franken, Minnesota (until January 2, 2018); Tammy Baldwin, Wisconsin; Chris Murphy, Connecticut; Elizabeth Warren, Massachusetts; Tim Kaine, Virginia; Maggie Hassan, New Hampshire; Tina Smith, Minnesota (from January 3, 2018); Doug Jones, Alabama (from January 3, 2018)

=== 116th Congress ===
Majority	Minority
Lamar Alexander, Tennessee, Chair; Mike Enzi, Wyoming; Richard Burr, North Carolina; Johnny Isakson, Georgia (until December 31, 2019); Rand Paul, Kentucky; Susan Collins, Maine; Bill Cassidy, Louisiana; Pat Roberts, Kansas; Lisa Murkowski, Alaska; Tim Scott, South Carolina; Mitt Romney, Utah; Mike Braun, Indiana; Kelly Loeffler, Georgia (from January 6, 2020)	Patty Murray, Washington, Ranking Member; Bernie Sanders, Vermont; Bob Casey Jr., Pennsylvania; Tammy Baldwin, Wisconsin; Chris Murphy, Connecticut; Elizabeth Warren, Massachusetts; Tim Kaine, Virginia; Maggie Hassan, New Hampshire; Tina Smith, Minnesota; Doug Jones, Alabama; Jacky Rosen, Nevada

Subcommittee	Chair	Ranking Member
Children and Families	Rand Paul (R-KY)	Bob Casey Jr. (D-PA)
Employment and Workplace Safety	Tim Scott (R-SC)	Tammy Baldwin (D-WI)
Primary Health and Retirement Security	Mike Enzi (R-WY)	Bernie Sanders (I-VT)

=== 117th Congress ===
Majority	Minority
Patty Murray, Washington, Chair; Bernie Sanders, Vermont; Bob Casey Jr., Pennsylvania; Tammy Baldwin, Wisconsin; Chris Murphy, Connecticut; Tim Kaine, Virginia; Maggie Hassan, New Hampshire; Tina Smith, Minnesota; Jacky Rosen, Nevada; Ben Ray Luján, New Mexico; John Hickenlooper, Colorado	Richard Burr, North Carolina, Ranking Member; Rand Paul, Kentucky; Susan Collins, Maine; Bill Cassidy, Louisiana; Lisa Murkowski, Alaska; Tim Scott, South Carolina; Mitt Romney, Utah; Mike Braun, Indiana; Roger Marshall, Kansas; Tommy Tuberville, Alabama; Jerry Moran, Kansas

Subcommittee	Chair	Ranking Member
Children and Families	Bob Casey Jr. (D-PA)	Bill Cassidy (R-LA)
Employment and Workplace Safety	John Hickenlooper (D-CO)	Mike Braun (R-IN)
Primary Health and Retirement Security	Bernie Sanders (I-VT)	Susan Collins (R-ME)

=== 118th Congress ===
Majority	Minority
Bernie Sanders, Vermont Chair; Patty Murray, Washington; Bob Casey Jr., Pennsylvania; Tammy Baldwin, Wisconsin; Chris Murphy, Connecticut; Tim Kaine, Virginia; Maggie Hassan, New Hampshire; Tina Smith, Minnesota; Ben Ray Luján, New Mexico; John Hickenlooper, Colorado; Ed Markey, Massachusetts	Bill Cassidy, Louisiana, Ranking Member; Rand Paul, Kentucky; Susan Collins, Maine; Lisa Murkowski, Alaska; Mike Braun, Indiana; Roger Marshall, Kansas; Mitt Romney, Utah; Tommy Tuberville, Alabama; Markwayne Mullin, Oklahoma; Ted Budd, North Carolina

Subcommittees

Subcommittee Name	Chair	Ranking Member
Children and Families	Bob Casey Jr. (D-PA)	Tommy Tuberville (R-AL)
Employment and Workplace Safety	John Hickenlooper (D-CO)	Mike Braun (R-IN)
Primary Health and Retirement Security	Ed Markey (D-MA)	Roger Marshall (R-KS)

== Defunct subcommittees ==
The committee has had other subcommittees in the past, such as:

- the Subcommittee on Migratory Labor during the 1950s through 1970s.
- the Subcommittee on Health and Scientific Research during the 1970s.
- the Subcommittee Investigating Violations of Free Speech and the Rights of Labor, informally known as the "La Follette Civil Liberties Committee"

== Chairs ==
=== Education 1869–1870 ===
Name	Party	State	Start	End
Charles Drake	Republican	MO	1869	1870

=== Education and Labor, 1870–1947 ===
Name	Party	State	Start	End
Frederick Sawyer	Republican	SC	1870	1873
James Flanagan	Republican	TX	1873	1875
Orris Ferry	Republican	CT	1875	
John Patterson	Republican	SC	1875	1877
Ambrose Burnside	Republican	RI	1877	1879
James Bailey	Democratic	TN	1879	1881
Henry Blair	Republican	NH	1881	1891
Joseph Carey	Republican	WY	1891	1893
James Kyle	People's	SD	1893	1895
George Shoup	Republican	ID	1895	1897
James Kyle	People's	SD	1897	1901
Louis McComas	Republican	MD	1901	1905
Boies Penrose	Republican	PA	1905	
Jonathan Dolliver	Republican	IA	1905	1909
William Borah	Republican	ID	1909	1913
Hoke Smith	Democratic	GA	1913	1919
William Kenyon	Democratic	IA	1919	1922
William Borah	Republican	ID	1922	1924
Lawrence Phipps	Republican	CO	1924	1926
James Couzens	Republican	MI	1926	1929
Jesse Metcalf	Republican	RI	1929	1933
David Walsh	Democratic	MA	1933	1937
Hugo Black	Democratic	AL	1937	
Elbert Thomas	Democratic	UT	1937	1945
James Murray	Democratic	MT	1945	1947

=== Labor and Public Welfare, 1947–1977 ===
Name	Party	State	Start	End
Robert Taft	Republican	OH	1947	1949
Elbert Thomas	Democratic	UT	1949	1951
James Murray	Democratic	MT	1951	1953
Alexander Smith	Republican	NJ	1953	1955
Lister Hill	Democratic	AL	1955	1969
Ralph Yarborough	Democratic	TX	1969	1971
Pete Williams	Democratic	NJ	1971	1977

=== Human Resources, 1977–1979 ===
Name	Party	State	Start	End
Pete Williams	Democratic	NJ	1977	1979

=== Labor and Human Resources, 1979–1999 ===
Name	Party	State	Start	End
Pete Williams	Democratic	NJ	1979	1981
Orrin Hatch	Republican	UT	1981	1987
Ted Kennedy	Democratic	MA	1987	1995
Nancy Kassebaum	Republican	KS	1995	1997
Jim Jeffords	Republican	VT	1997	1999

=== Health, Education, Labor and Pensions, 1999–present ===
Name	Party	State	Start	End
Jim Jeffords	Republican	VT	1999	2001
Ted Kennedy	Democratic	MA	2001	
Jim Jeffords	Republican	VT	2001	
Ted Kennedy	Democratic	MA	2001	2003
Judd Gregg	Republican	NH	2003	2005
Mike Enzi	Republican	WY	2005	2007
Ted Kennedy	Democratic	MA	2007	2009
Chris Dodd; Acting	Democratic	CT	2009	
Tom Harkin	Democratic	IA	2009	2015
Lamar Alexander	Republican	TN	2015	2021
Patty Murray	Democratic	WA	2021	2023
Bernie Sanders	Independent	VT	2023	2025
Bill Cassidy	Republican	LA	2025	present

== Ranking members ==
Name	Party	State	Start	End
Elbert Thomas	Democratic	UT	???	1949
Robert Taft	Republican	OH	1949	1953
James Murray	Democratic	MT	1953	1955
Alexander Smith	Republican	NJ	1955	1959
Barry Goldwater	Republican	UT	1959	1965
Jacob Javits	Republican	NY	1965	1979
Richard Schweiker	Republican	PA	1979	1981
Ted Kennedy	Democratic	MA	1981	1987
Orrin Hatch	Republican	UT	1987	1993
Nancy Kassebaum	Republican	KS	1993	1995
Ted Kennedy	Democratic	MA	1995	2001
Judd Gregg	Republican	NH	2001	2003
Ted Kennedy	Democratic	MA	2003	2007
Mike Enzi	Republican	WY	2007	2013
Lamar Alexander	Republican	TN	2013	2015
Patty Murray	Democratic	WA	2015	2021
Richard Burr	Republican	NC	2021	2023
Bill Cassidy	Republican	LA	2023	2025
Bernie Sanders	Independent	VT	2025	present

== See also ==
- List of United States Senate committees
- Social policy
- Health policy
- Education policy
- Labour law
- Pensions
- Health education
