= United States Senate Health Subcommittee on Employment and Workplace Safety =

US Senate subcommittee of the Committee on Health, Education, Labor and Pensions

The United States Senate Health Subcommittee on Employment and Workplace Safety is one of the three subcommittees within the Senate Committee on Health, Education, Labor and Pensions.

== Jurisdiction ==
The Subcommittee has jurisdiction over a variety of employment issues including workforce education and training, worker health and safety, wage and hour laws, and workplace flexibility.

== Members, 119th Congress ==
Majority	Minority
Jim Banks, Indiana, Chair; Roger Marshall, Kansas; Tim Scott, South Carolina; Josh Hawley, Missouri; Tommy Tuberville, Alabama; Jon Husted, Ohio; Alan Armstrong, Oklahoma	John Hickenlooper, Colorado, Ranking Member; Tammy Baldwin, Wisconsin; Chris Murphy, Connecticut; Tim Kaine, Virginia; Maggie Hassan, New Hampshire; Angela Alsobrooks, Maryland
Ex officio
Bill Cassidy, Louisiana	Bernie Sanders, Vermont

== Historical subcommittee rosters ==
=== 118th Congress ===
Majority	Minority
John Hickenlooper, Colorado, Chair; Bob Casey Jr., Pennsylvania; Tammy Baldwin, Wisconsin; Tim Kaine, Virginia; Ben Ray Luján, New Mexico; Ed Markey, Massachusetts	Mike Braun, Indiana, Ranking Member; Roger Marshall, Kansas; Mitt Romney, Utah; Tommy Tuberville, Alabama; Ted Budd, North Carolina
Ex officio
Bernie Sanders, Vermont	Bill Cassidy, Louisiana

=== 117th Congress ===
Majority	Minority
John Hickenlooper, Colorado, Chair; Tammy Baldwin, Wisconsin; Tina Smith, Minnesota; Jacky Rosen, Nevada; Ben Ray Luján, New Mexico	Mike Braun, Indiana, Ranking Member; Tommy Tuberville, Alabama; Rand Paul, Kentucky; Tim Scott, South Carolina; Mitt Romney, Utah
Ex officio
Patty Murray, Washington	Richard Burr, North Carolina
