= United States Senate Health Subcommittee on Education and the American Family =

U.S. Senate subcommittee of the Committee on Health, Education, Labor and Pensions

The United States Senate Health Subcommittee on Education and the American Family is one of the three subcommittees within the Senate Committee on Health, Education, Labor and Pensions. It was previously named the Subcommittee on Children and Families.

== Jurisdiction ==
The Subcommittee has jurisdiction over a wide range of issues including Head Start, child care and child support such as the Child Care and Development Block Grant Act of 2013, the Family Medical Leave Act, National Service, women and children’s healthcare, and other issues involving children, youth, and families.

== Members, 119th Congress ==
Majority	Minority
Tommy Tuberville, Alabama, Chair; Rand Paul, Kentucky; Lisa Murkowski, Alaska; Tim Scott, South Carolina; Jim Banks, Indiana; Jon Husted, Ohio; Ashley Moody, Florida	Lisa Blunt Rochester, Delaware, Ranking Member; Patty Murray, Washington; Tim Kaine, Virginia; Ed Markey, Massachusetts; Andy Kim, New Jersey; Angela Alsobrooks, Maryland
Ex officio
Bill Cassidy, Louisiana	Bernie Sanders, Vermont

== Historical committee rosters ==
=== 117th Congress ===
Majority	Minority
Bob Casey, Jr., Pennsylvania, Chair; Bernie Sanders, Vermont; Chris Murphy, Connecticut; Tim Kaine, Virginia; Maggie Hassan, New Hampshire; Tina Smith, Minnesota; John Hickenlooper, Colorado	Bill Cassidy, Louisiana, Ranking Member; Mitt Romney, Utah; Susan Collins, Maine; Lisa Murkowski, Alaska; Jerry Moran, Kansas; Roger Marshall, Kansas; Tommy Tuberville, Alabama
Ex officio
Patty Murray, Washington	Richard Burr, North Carolina

=== 118th Congress ===
Majority	Minority
Bob Casey, Jr., Pennsylvania, Chair; Patty Murray, Washington; Chris Murphy, Connecticut; Tim Kaine, Virginia; Maggie Hassan, New Hampshire; Tina Smith, Minnesota	Tommy Tuberville, Alabama, Ranking Member; Rand Paul, Kentucky; Lisa Murkowski, Alaska; Mitt Romney, Utah; Markwayne Mullin, Oklahoma
Ex officio
Bernie Sanders, Vermont	Bill Cassidy, Louisiana
