= United States Senate Armed Services Subcommittee on Personnel =

The Senate Armed Services Subcommittee on Personnel is one of seven subcommittees within the Senate Armed Services Committee.

== Jurisdiction ==
The Personnel Subcommittee has jurisdiction over all matters relating to active and reserve military personnel, including pay rates, military health care and education benefits, Morale, Welfare and Recreation services, and military justice. The subcommittee also oversees issues related to prisoners of war and military personnel who are missing in action.

== Members, 119th Congress ==
Majority	Minority
Tommy Tuberville, Alabama, Chair; Joni Ernst, Iowa; Rick Scott, Florida; Ted Budd, North Carolina; Jim Banks, Indiana	Elizabeth Warren, Massachusetts, Ranking Member; Richard Blumenthal, Connecticut; Mazie Hirono, Hawaii; Tammy Duckworth, Illinois
Ex officio
Roger Wicker, Mississippi	Jack Reed, Rhode Island

== Historical subcommittee rosters ==
=== 118th Congress ===
Majority	Minority
Elizabeth Warren, Massachusetts, Chair; Mazie Hirono, Hawaii; Richard Blumenthal, Connecticut; Tim Kaine, Virginia; Tammy Duckworth, Illinois	Rick Scott, Florida, Ranking Member; Mike Rounds, South Dakota; Dan Sullivan, Alaska; Ted Budd, North Carolina
Ex officio
Jack Reed, Rhode Island	Roger Wicker, Mississippi

=== 117th Congress ===
Majority	Minority
Kirsten Gillibrand, New York, Chair; Mazie Hirono, Hawaii; Elizabeth Warren, Massachusetts	Thom Tillis, North Carolina, Ranking Member; Josh Hawley, Missouri; Tommy Tuberville, Alabama
Ex officio
Jack Reed, Rhode Island	James Inhofe, Oklahoma

=== 116th Congress ===
Majority	Minority
Thom Tillis, North Carolina, Chairman; Mike Rounds, South Dakota; Martha McSally, Arizona (until December 2, 2020); Tim Scott, South Carolina	Kirsten Gillibrand, New York, Ranking Member; Elizabeth Warren, Massachusetts; Tammy Duckworth, Illinois
Ex officio
James Inhofe, Oklahoma	Jack Reed, Rhode Island

=== 115th Congress ===
Majority	Minority
Thom Tillis, North Carolina, Chairman; Joni Ernst, Iowa; Lindsey Graham, South Carolina; Ben Sasse, Nebraska	Kirsten Gillibrand, New York, Ranking Member; Claire McCaskill, Missouri; Elizabeth Warren, Massachusetts
Ex officio
John McCain, Arizona	Jack Reed, Rhode Island

=== 114th Congress ===
Majority	Minority
Lindsey Graham, South Carolina, Chairman; Roger Wicker, Mississippi; Tom Cotton, Arkansas; Thom Tillis, North Carolina; Dan Sullivan, Alaska	Kirsten Gillibrand, New York, Ranking Member; Claire McCaskill, Missouri; Richard Blumenthal, Connecticut; Angus King, Maine
Ex officio
John McCain, Arizona	Jack Reed, Rhode Island

== See also ==
- U.S. House Armed Services Subcommittee on Military Personnel
