= Campaign for Accountability =

Nonprofit watchdog group

- Founded: 2015
- Founder: Anne Weismann
- Type: 501(c)(3)
- Key people: Anne Weismann, Co-Founder; Michelle Kuppersmith, Executive Director
- Website: www.campaignforaccountability.org

Campaign for Accountability (CfA) is a liberal 501(c)(3) non-profit ethics watchdog group headquartered in Washington, D.C. CfA was co-founded in May 2015 by Anne Weismann, former legal counsel for the watchdog group Citizens for Responsibility and Ethics in Washington (CREW), and Louis Mayberg, former chairman of CREW. CfA group states that it "uses research, litigation and aggressive communications to expose misconduct and malfeasance in public life."

== History and staff ==
CfA was co-founded in May 2015 by Anne Weismann and Louis Mayberg (who serves on the group's advisory board). Both were formerly part of the watchdog group Citizens for Responsibility and Ethics in Washington (CREW): Weismann was the group's chief counsel for ten years and Mayberg was the group's former chairman and founder. Weismann is also past president of the American Society of Access Professionals and a member of the OpenTheGovernment.org steering committee. Daniel Stevens, formerly a senior researcher at CREW, became deputy director for CfA, and in 2017 became CfA's executive director.

CfA originated as a project of the Hopewell Fund in 2015 and attained standalone 501(c)3 status in May 2017.

== Activities ==
In May 2015, the CfA filed a lawsuit against the Securities and Exchange Commission, seeking to compel the agency to promulgate a regulation requiring corporations to disclose their political contributions that would inform investors how corporations are spending their money. The CfA acted on behalf of Stephen Silberstein, a shareholder of Aetna Inc. who had unsuccessfully sought to gain information on the company's political contributions. In January 2016, Judge Rosemary M. Collyer of the U.S. District Court for the District of Columbia dismissed the suit, ruling that the plaintiff had not demonstrated that SEC had a "clear legal duty" to open a rulemaking proceeding or that its failure to do so was arbitrary and capricious.

In November 2015, the CfA asked the Senate Committee on Homeland Security and Governmental Affairs and the Federal Election Commission to get to the bottom of allegations that the Macau casino operations of Sheldon Adelson's Las Vegas Sands Corp. are tied to organized crime. Weismann said that "Given the extent to which Mr. Adelson's wealth derives from Macau and his dominant role in funding Republican candidates, it seems highly likely that illegal foreign money has made its way into American elections." A spokesman for the Las Vegas Sands Corp. denied the allegations, and the CfA subsequently issued a retraction of its statement, saying: "The available evidence supports further investigation into these alleged matters but does not support the statements made by CfA outside of its filings" with the Senate committee and the FEC.

In December 2015, the CfA asked the U.S. Department of Justice to investigate David H. Stevens, the chief executive of the Mortgage Bankers Association and the former commissioner of the Federal Housing Administration, for possible violations of "revolving door" ethics laws. The National Legal and Policy Center joined this call several months later.

In January 2016, OpenSecrets published a report showing that the largest contributors to the campaigns of Senator Bob Corker, Republican of Tennessee, were the tenants of a commercial building that the senator owns in Chattanooga. Stevens of CfA said that a tenant's ties to Corker raise questions on whether it was paying fair market value in rent. Separately, the CfA filed ethics complaints against Corker with the U.S. Securities and Exchange Commission and U.S. Senate Ethics Committee, accusing him of insider trading in three particular hedge funds. Corker denied the allegations, calling them "categorically false" and "baseless."

In March 2016, the CfA made a request to Kim Davis—the controversial county clerk of Rowan County, Kentucky, who had gained international attention the previous year after defying a federal court order to issue marriage licenses to same-sex couples—for access to public records under the Kentucky Open Records Act. The CfA specifically sought copies of retainer agreements and lawyer-client engagement agreements between Davis and Liberty Counsel, the religious advocacy organization that represented Davis in the marriage-license dispute. Liberty Counsel, which responded to the request on Davis' behalf, refused to comply, arguing that the documents were preliminary and private records not subject to the Act. The CfA appealed to the Office of the Kentucky Attorney General, which under Kentucky law has the authority to make binding rulings on the Open Records Act, and resubmitted its request to Davis' office in April 2016. In May 2016, the Attorney General's Office sought to privately review the records at issue to determine if an exemption applied, but Liberty Counsel refused to make most of the documents available for a private review. In an opinion issued on June 30, 2016, the Attorney General's Office made a finding favorable to the CfA, determining that Davis had violated the Open Records Act, saying that her conduct had the effect of "intentionally frustrating the attorney general's review of an open records request" which "would subvert the General Assembly's intent behind providing review by the attorney general."

In April 2016, the Campaign for Accountability launched the Google Transparency Project, a website on Google's "influence on government, public policies, and our lives." Funding for the project, and for the Campaign, was not disclosed, but in August 2016 Ken Glueck of Oracle confirmed that Oracle, who had been conducting a high-profile lawsuit against Google, was one of the funders.

In 2017, the group petitioned to unseal the divorce records of Andrew Puzder, who was at the time Donald Trump's nominee to become the United States Secretary of Labor. Puzder's ex-wife called the group's attempt to unseal her divorce records an "unfair invasion of my personal life." CfA also filed ethics complaint against Republican congressional aides who had worked for the Trump transition team. The group also filed a lawsuit arguing that the United States Department of Justice is failing to comply with a provision in the Freedom of Information Act that requires government agencies to make public "statements of policy and interpretations which have been adopted by the agency."

In March 2017, CfA and other groups asked Oregon Attorney General Ellen Rosenblum to investigate solar panel sales practices that "are designed to trick homeowners into buying or leasing solar panels" in violation of Oregon's Unlawful Trade Practices Act. The request to Rosenblum "singled out one company: California-based SolarCity." The organization reviewed 58 consumer complaints and said that the complaints indicated "a widespread pattern of apparent fraud and abuse by solar companies." A spokesman for CfA said, "Solar companies often seem to target vulnerable populations, leaving senior Oregonians and those living on fixed incomes with higher monthly utility costs and loans that often exceed what they can afford to pay, plunging them into debt."

In April 2017, CfA filed a complaint with the U.S. Attorney's Office for the Western District of Missouri, calling for a federal grand jury investigation into Missouri State Senate President Pro Tem Ron Richard's acceptance of a $100,000 campaign contribution from a Joplin, Missouri businessman, six days after introducing a bill "that would have affected a lawsuit against that donor's company" by restricting the ability of plaintiffs to sue under Missouri's consumer protection law. Both Richard and the contributor denied wrongdoing, saying that the allegation of pay to play was false.

In May 2017, CfA filed a complaint with the Office of Congressional Ethics, asking the office to open an investigation into whether U.S. Representative Rodney Frelinghuysen, Republican of New Jersey, the chair of the House Appropriations Committee, violated House ethics rules. The complaint involved a campaign fundraising letter that Frelinghuysen had written to a bank board member in which he criticized a progressive activist who was employed by the bank; Frelinghuysen added a handwritten note to the letter: "P.S. One of the ringleaders works in your bank!" The CfA argued that this "poison pen note" was a form of intimidation. Frelinghuysen hired lawyers following the complaint; his campaign adviser said that the complaint was "politically motivated."

In July 2017, CfA sent a letter to the Bureau of Consumer Protection at the Federal Trade Commission (FTC) to investigate what it says are a pattern of unscrupulous sales practices in the residential solar market.
