= Electoral history of Thom Tillis =

Elections featuring American politician

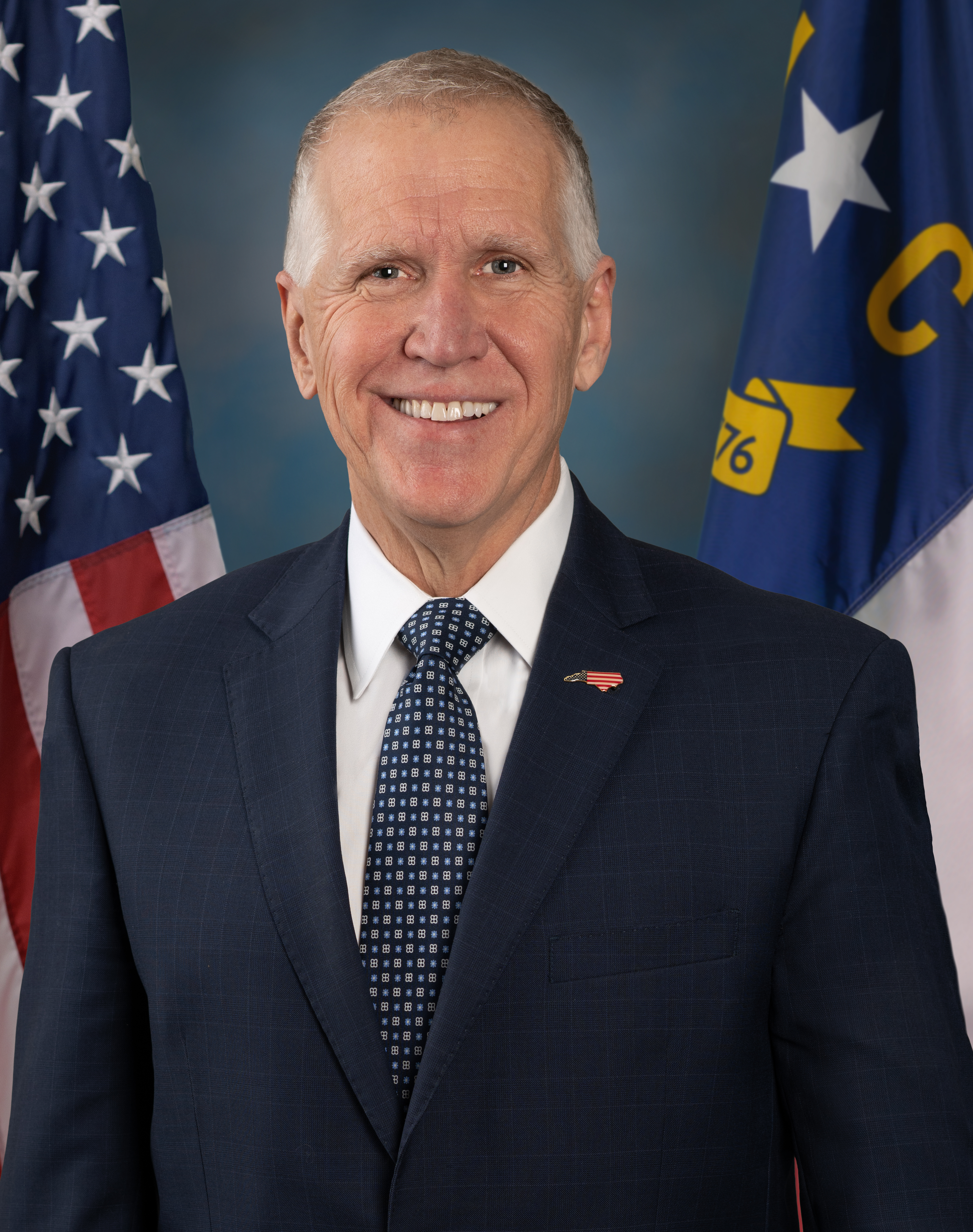
Thom Tillis during the 117th Congress

This is the electoral history of Thom Tillis, the senior United States senator from North Carolina since 2015. Previously, he represented the 98th district in the North Carolina House of Representatives from 2007 to 2015 and served as Speaker of the North Carolina House of Representatives from 2011 to 2015. In 2020, he won re-election to a second term in the Senate, defeating Democratic challenger Cal Cunningham, and his term will last through January 3, 2027.

== North Carolina House of Representatives ==
Official portraits of Tillis as a member of the North Carolina House of Representatives.

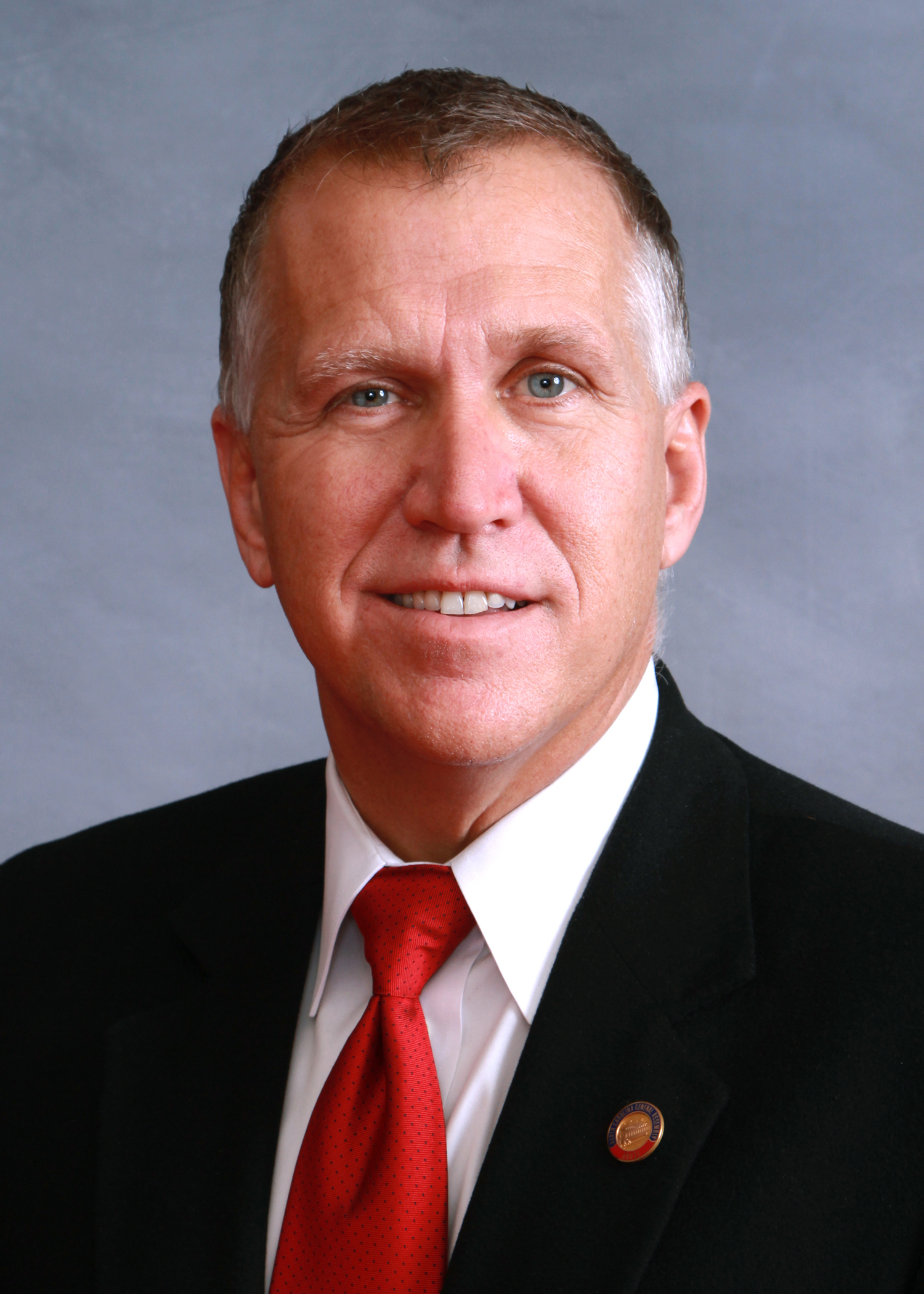
2012

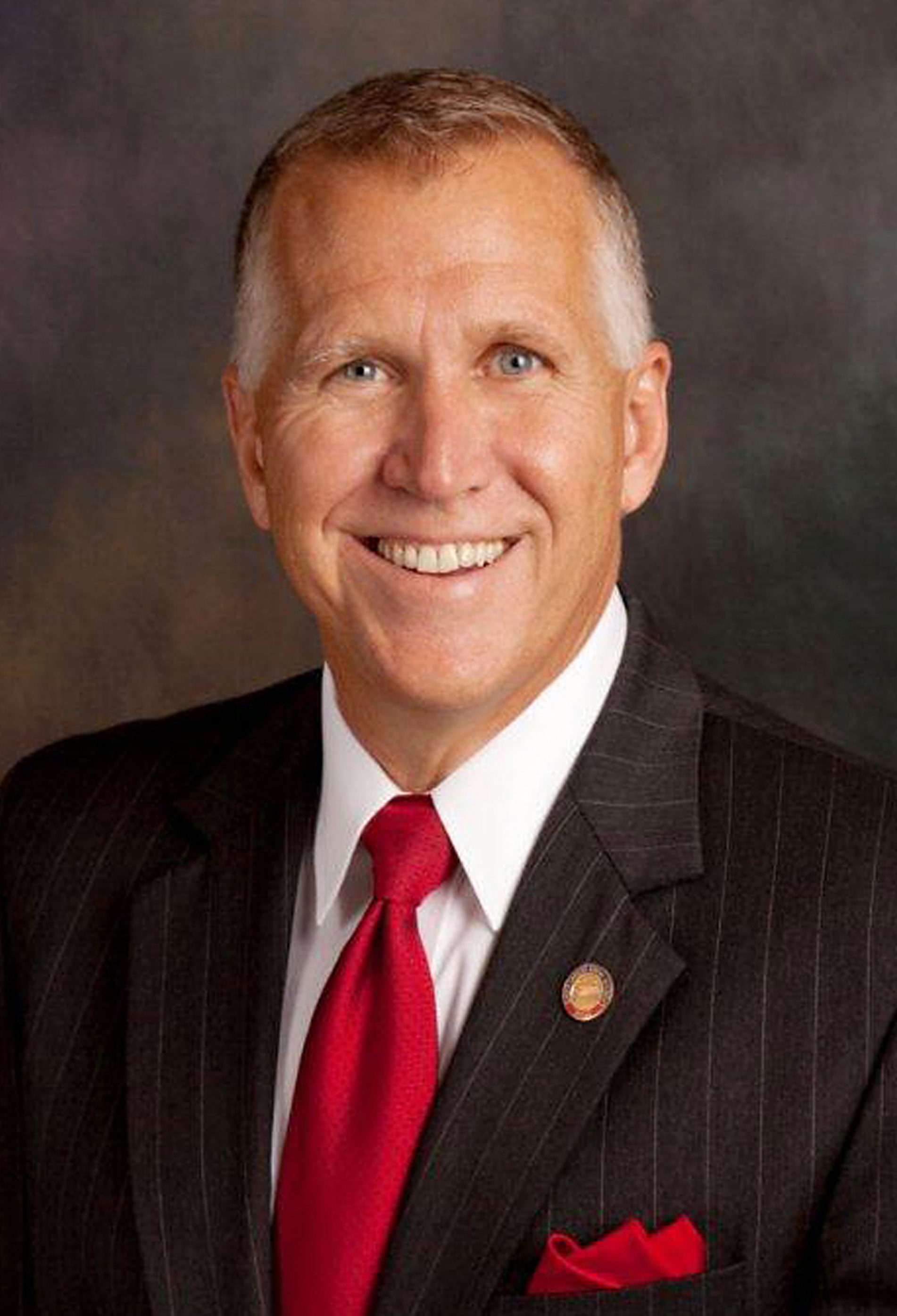
2014

=== 2006 ===
North Carolina House of Representatives 98th district, 2006 election
Primary election
| Party | Candidate | Votes | % |
|---|---|---|---|
| Republican | Thom Tillis | 1,805 | 62.98% |
| Republican | John W. Rhodes (incumbent) | 1,061 | 37.02% |
| Total votes | | 2,866 | 100% |
General election
| Republican | Thom Tillis | 14,479 | 100.00% |
| Total votes | | 14,479 | 100% |
| Republican hold | | | |

=== 2008 ===
North Carolina House of Representatives 98th district, 2008 general election
| Party | Candidate | Votes | % |
|---|---|---|---|
| Republican | Thom Tillis (incumbent) | 38,875 | 100.00% |
| Total votes | | 38,875 | 100% |
| Republican hold | | | |

=== 2010 ===
North Carolina House of Representatives 98th district, 2010 general election
| Party | Candidate | Votes | % |
|---|---|---|---|
| Republican | Thom Tillis (incumbent) | 23,540 | 100.00% |
| Total votes | | 23,540 | 100% |
| Republican hold | | | |

=== 2012 ===
North Carolina House of Representatives 98th district, 2012 general election
| Party | Candidate | Votes | % |
|---|---|---|---|
| Republican | Thom Tillis (incumbent) | 27,971 | 100.00% |
| Total votes | | 27,971 | 100% |
| Republican hold | | | |

== United States Senate ==
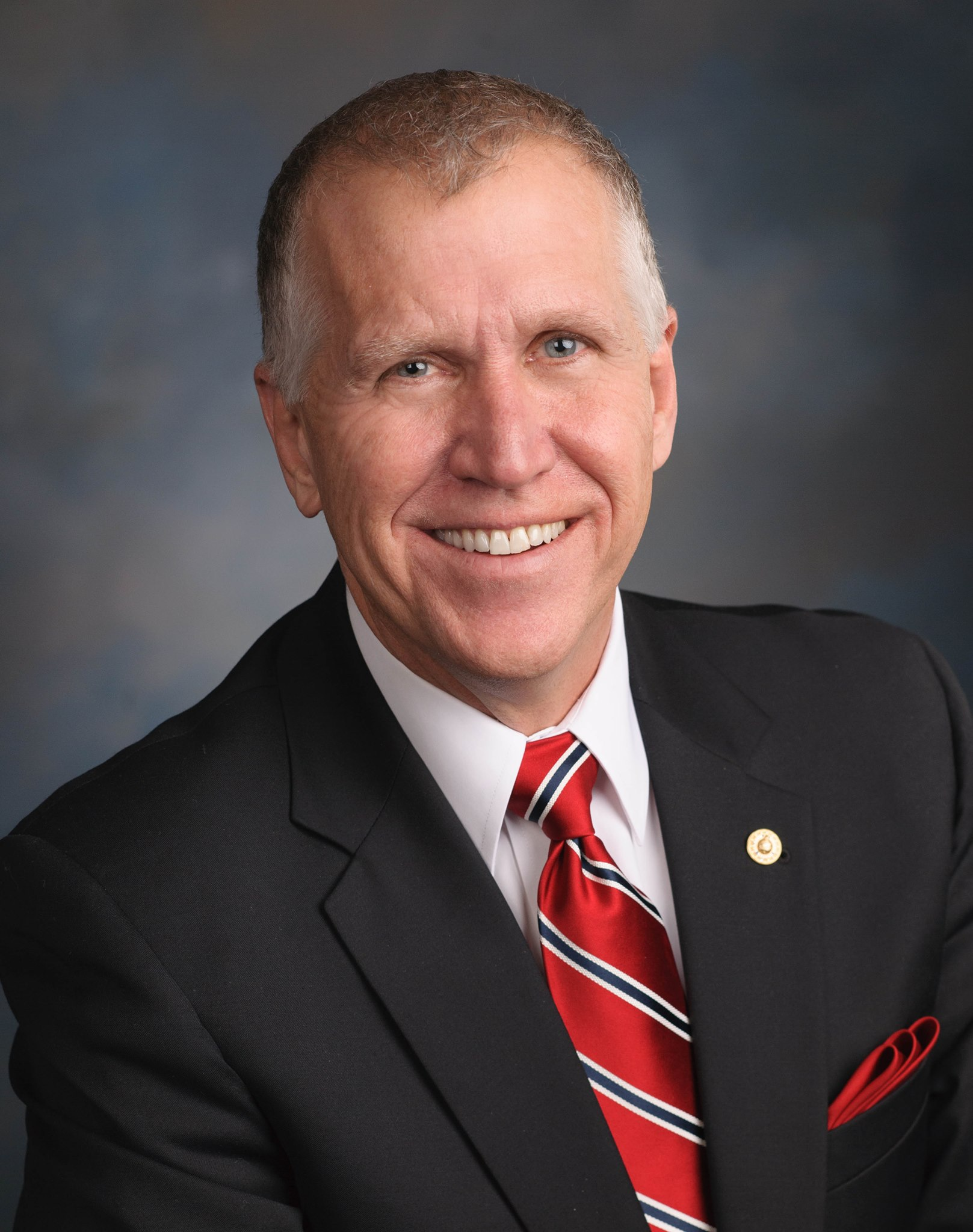
Official portrait, 2015

=== 2014 ===
2014 United States Senate election in North Carolina
Primary election
| Party | Candidate | Votes | % |
|---|---|---|---|
| Republican | Thom Tillis | 223,174 | 45.68% |
| Republican | Greg Brannon | 132,630 | 27.15% |
| Republican | Mark Harris | 85,727 | 17.55% |
| Republican | Heather Grant | 22,971 | 4.70% |
| Republican | Jim Snyder | 9,414 | 1.93% |
| Republican | Ted Alexander | 9,258 | 1.89% |
| Republican | Alex Lee Bradshaw | 3,528 | 0.72% |
| Republican | Edward Kryn | 1,853 | 0.38% |
| Total votes | | 488,555 | 100% |
General election
| Republican | Thom Tillis | 1,423,259 | 48.82% |
| Democratic | Kay Hagan (incumbent) | 1,377,651 | 47.26% |
| Libertarian | Sean Haugh | 109,100 | 3.74% |
| Write-in | John W. Rhodes | 621 | 0.02% |
| Write-in | David Waddell | 201 | 0.01% |
| Write-in | Barry Gurney | 142 | 0.00% |
| Write-in | | 4,307 | 0.15% |
| Total votes | | 2,915,281 | 100% |
| Republican gain from Democratic | | | |

=== 2020 ===
Official portraits of Tillis as a member of the U.S. Senate

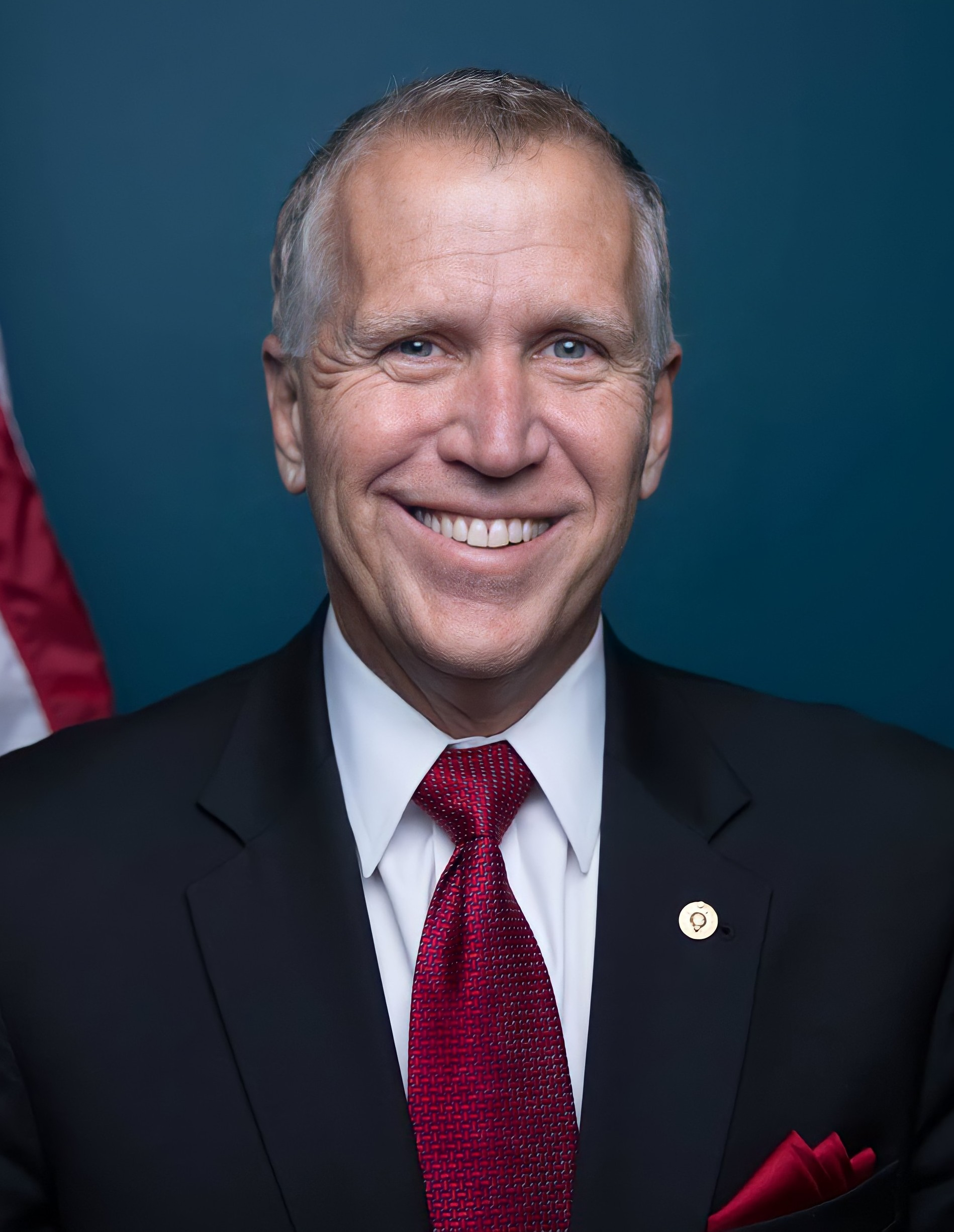
2016

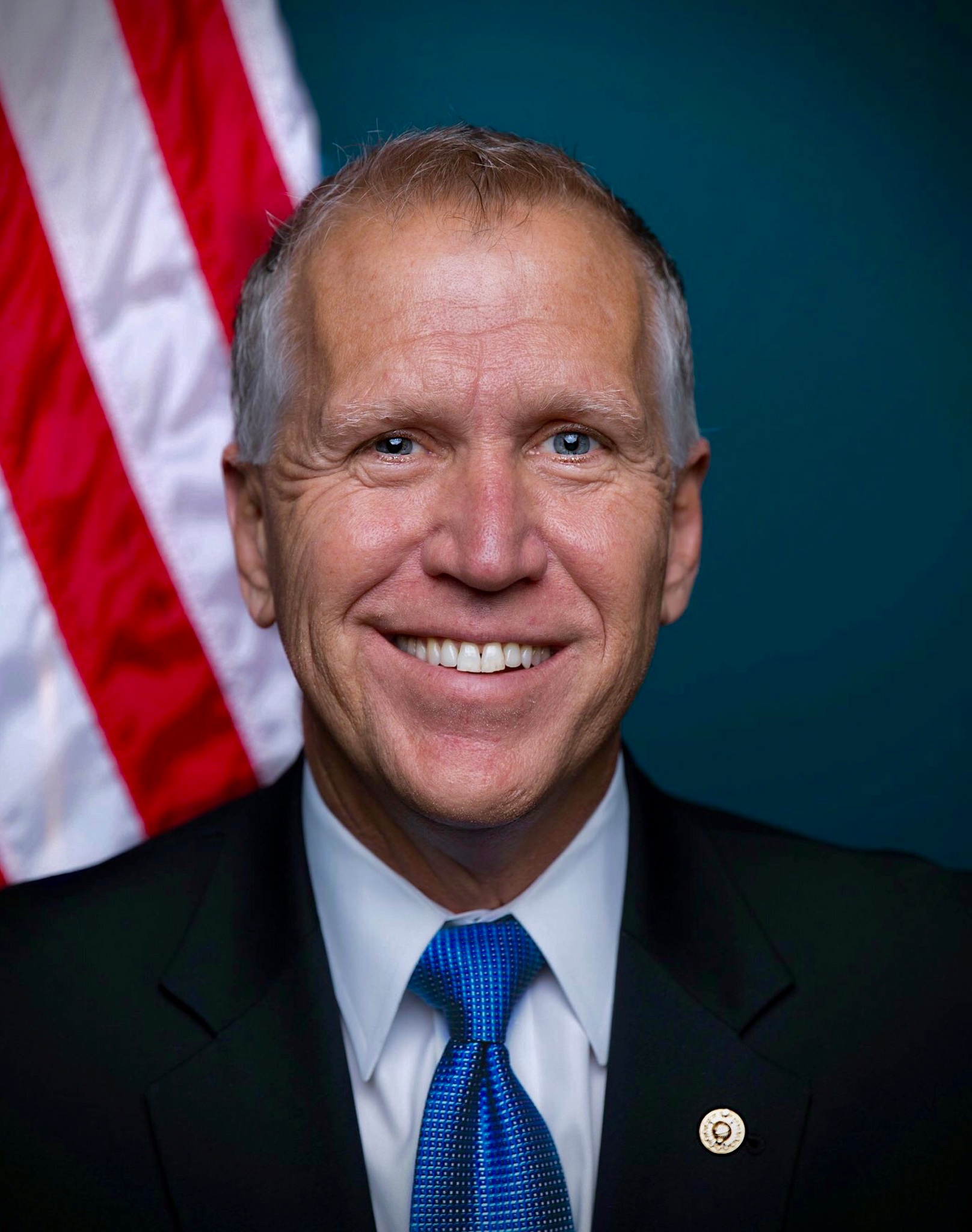
2019

2020 United States Senate Republican primary in North Carolina
Primary election
| Party | Candidate | Votes | % |
|---|---|---|---|
| Republican | Thom Tillis (incumbent) | 608,943 | 78.08% |
| Republican | Paul Wright | 58,908 | 7.55% |
| Republican | Larry Holmquist | 57,356 | 7.35% |
| Republican | Sharon Y. Hudson | 54,651 | 7.01% |
| Total votes | | 779,858 | 100% |
General election
| Republican | Thom Tillis (incumbent) | 2,665,598 | 48.69% |
| Democratic | Cal Cunningham | 2,569,965 | 46.94% |
| Libertarian | Shannon Bray | 171,571 | 3.13% |
| Constitution | Kevin E. Hayes | 67,818 | 1.24% |
| Total votes | | 5,474,952 | 100% |
| Republican hold | | | |
