= Tennessee House of Representatives 65th district =

State legislative district in Tennessee

Tennessee's 65th State House of Representatives district
- Map of Tennessee House districts with the 65th District shaded in red
Representative
Lee Reeves; R–Franklin
since 2025
- Demographics: 81.2% White; 4.6% Black; 9.3% Hispanic; 1.5% Asian; 3.1% Multiracial
- Population (2024): 79,355

The Tennessee House of Representatives 65th district is one of the 99 legislative districts in the lower house of the Tennessee General Assembly. The district is located in Middle Tennessee and covers the west of Williamson County. The district includes part of Franklin and most of Thompson's Station. It also includes Fairview. Lee Reeves has represented the district since 2025.

== Demographics ==
The Tennessee Comptroller estimates the population as of 2024 at 79,355.

- 81.2% of the district is White
- 9.3% of the district is Hispanic
- 4.6% of the district is Black
- 1.5% of the district is Asian
- 3.1% of the district is Two or more races

Detailed demographic information is also available through Census Reporter.

== History ==
The 88th Tennessee General Assembly was the first in which all districts were numbered. At this time, the 65th district was composed of Decatur, Lawrence, Lewis, Perry and Wayne counties. From the 89th-92nd GAs, it was composed of Decatur, Hardin, Lawrence, Perry and Wayne counties. At the 93rd GA, it was composed of Giles, Lawrence, Lincoln and Maury counties. From the 94th-102nd GAs, it was composed of Giles and Marshall counties. From the 103rd-107th GAs, it was composed of Giles and parts of Lincoln and Marshall counties. Since the 108th General Assembly, it has been part of Williamson County.

== List of Representatives ==
Representative	Party	Years of Service	General Assembly	Hometown
Lee Reeves	Republican	2025-present	114th	Franklin
Sam Whitson	Republican	2017-2024	110th-113th	Franklin
Jeremy Durham	Republican	2013-2016*	108th-109th	Franklin
Eddie Bass	Democratic	2007-2012	105th-107th	Prospect
Joe Fowlkes	Democratic	1991-2006	97th-104th	Cornersville
C. E. DePriest	Democratic	1983-1990	93rd-96th	Pulaski
Ralph Duncan	Republican	1979-1982	91st-92nd	Decaturville
Gene Davidson	Democratic	1975-1978	89th-90th	Waynesboro
G. L. Teague	Republican	1973-1974	88th	Parsons

- Jeremy Durham was expelled September 13, 2016.
