= Billy Spivey =

American politician (born 1969)

Member of the Tennessee House of Representatives from the 92nd district
- In office January 8, 2013 – January 10, 2017
- Preceded by: G. A. Hardaway (redistricted)
- Succeeded by: Rick Tillis

Personal details
- Born: January 18, 1969 (age 57)
- Party: Republican
- Spouse: Kim
- Children: 6
- Education: Columbia State Community College (AAS)
- Occupation: Politician; maintenance manager

Military service
- Allegiance: United States
- Branch/service: United States Army

Billy Spivey (born January 18, 1969) is an American politician who served as a member of the Tennessee House of Representatives from the 92nd district for two terms between 2013 and 2017.

== Early life and career ==
Spivey was born on January 18, 1969. He received an (AAS) in Technology from Columbia State Community College in Columbia, Tennessee. He served in the United States Army during the Gulf War with the 1st Cavalry Division. He also graduated from the Leadership Marshall County program. In 2012, he worked as a maintenance superintendent at Walker Die Casting.

He is the former chairman of the Marshall County Republican Party and the Marshall County Commission, as well as a former member of the Tennessee Technology Center advisory board.

== Tennessee House of Representatives ==
=== Elections ===
Spivey first ran for the Tennessee House of Representatives in 2010. He challenged Democratic congressman Eddie Bass in the 65th district. Spivey secured the Republican nomination, but Bass defeated him in the general election.

In 2012, Spivey ran again, this time for the newly redrawn 92nd district. He faced three challengers in the Republican primary, but won the nomination by a comfortable margin. In the general election, Spivey easily defeated Vicki Cain. He ran for re-election in 2014, where he was uncontested in the primary and won his rematch against Cain.

Spivey did not seek re-election in 2016 and left the legislature. However, he attempted to return to his seat two years later, challenging his successor, Rick Tillis, in the Republican primary. Tillis defeated Spivey in the primary, with Spivey receiving 43% of the vote.

=== Tenure ===
In the Tennessee House, he served on the Agriculture and Natural Resources and the State Government committees. During his time in the Tennessee House, he played a pivotal role in phasing out the Hall income tax. He also expressed skepticism toward handing the Nickajack Reservoir over to the state of Georgia. Spivey was a central figure in replacing Common Core in Tennessee with an alternative crafted by Tennessee-based educators and experts.

== Personal life ==
Spivey is married to Kim Spivey, a schoolteacher, and they raised six daughters. He is a Reformed Baptist.

Spivey is a member of the Tennessee State Guard.

== Electoral history ==
Electoral history of Billy Spivey
Year	Office	District	Party	Primary			General			Result	Ref.
Year	Office	District	Party	Total	%	P.	Total	%	P.	Result	Ref.
2010	Tennessee House of Representatives	65	Republican	4,543	100.00%	1st	7,131	45.84%	2nd	Lost	
2012	Tennessee House of Representatives	92	Republican	2,592	57.08%	1st	13,089	60.60%	1st	Won	
2014	Tennessee House of Representatives	92	Republican	6,267	100.00%	1st	8,089	66.35%	1st	Won	
2018	Tennessee House of Representatives	92	Republican	3,586	42.82%	2nd	—	—	—	Lost	
