= Paul Neebe =

American classical trumpeter

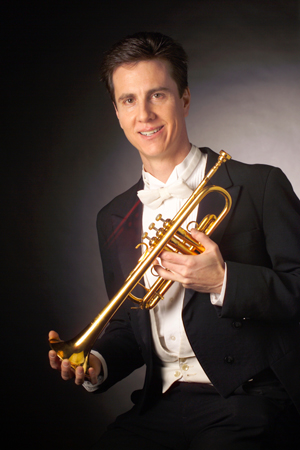
- Paul Neebe

Background information
- Origin: Chapel Hill, NC
- Genres: Classical
- Occupation: Trumpeter
- Labels: Albany Records, MDG
- Website: http://www.paulneebe.com

Paul Neebe is an American classical trumpeter who performs widely as a soloist, orchestral musician, and chamber player. He currently serves as principal trumpet of the Roanoke Symphony Orchestra, Wintergreen Festival Orchestra, and formerly of the Charlottesville University Symphony Orchestra in Virginia. He released Te Deum in 2003, a CD released on the German label MDG that features solo trumpet and organ, and American Trumpet Concertos in 2006, a CD released on Albany Records that consists entirely of worldwide premieres with the Slovak Radio Symphony Orchestra. His chamber work can be heard on Walter Ross: Brass Trios, a CD released on DCD Records. Neebe garnered semi-finalist honors at the First International Trumpet Festival Competition in Moscow. He has performed several times for the Goethe Institute Cultural Program in Rothenburg, Germany, and regularly gives solo recitals across the United States and Germany. Neebe has served as Trumpet Mentor at the National Music Festival since its inception.

Neebe works regularly to expand the trumpet's library of solo literature, focusing, in particular, on new works by American composers. In 2014, Neebe commissioned several new works for trumpet and orchestra from composers Eddie Bass, Richard Cioffari, Walter Ross, and Roger Petrich for 21st American Trumpet Concertos, a CD on Albany Records.

He previously served on the performance faculty at the University of Virginia and James Madison University, and has taught at Elon University and Saint Augustine's College. He holds both the Bachelor and Master of Music degrees from The Juilliard School, as well as the Doctorate of Musical Arts degree from the Catholic University of America. Neebe's teachers have included Barbara Butler, Bernard Adelstein, Arnold Jacobs, Steve Hendrickson, Douglas Myers, Vincent Penzarella, William Vacchiano, and John Harding.
