= Todd Warner =

American politician (born 1971)

Member of the Tennessee House of Representatives from the 92nd district
- Incumbent
- Assumed office January 12, 2021
- Preceded by: Rick Tillis

Personal details
- Born: June 13, 1971 (age 55) Chapel Hill, Tennessee, U.S.
- Party: Republican
- Spouse: Cindy
- Children: 3
- Occupation: Politician; farmer; small business owner
- Website: House website Campaign website

Todd Warner (born June 13, 1971) is an American farmer, small business owner, and politician representing the 92nd district, encompassing Marshall County and parts of Williamson County, in the Tennessee House of Representatives. He is a Republican.

== Early life and career ==
Todd Warner was born on June 13, 1971. He grew up on a dairy farm as the oldest sibling of five brothers. He graduated from Forrest School in Chapel Hill, Tennessee.

Warner is a farmer and owns a small construction business. Before running for the Tennessee House of Representatives, he served as a Marshall County School Board member and an alderman for the town of Chapel Hill.

== Tennessee House of Representatives (2021–present) ==
=== Elections ===
In 2020, Warner ran to represent the 92nd district in the Tennessee House of Representatives, encompassing Marshall County and parts of Franklin, Lincoln, and Marion counties. He won a plurality in a three-way primary, beating incumbent Rick Tillis and challenger Vincent Cuevas. Because no other candidates filed to run, Warner won the general election uncontested.

In 2022, the 92nd district was redrawn to include parts of Williamson County. Warner faced a second three-way primary against Matt Fitterer and Jeff Ford, but this time won a majority of primary votes. He defeated Democrat Angela Hughes in the general election.

In 2024, Warner was uncontested for the Republican nomination. He defeated Democrat Teri Mai in the general election.

In 2026, the Tennessee General Assembly passed a mid-cycle redistricting map splitting Memphis between multiple federal congressional districts. The day of the vote, Warner entered the State Capitol draped in a Trump 2024 flag. He was stopped by the Sergeant at Arms, who confiscated the flag before Warner could enter the chamber. After the incident, Warner announced he would run for the newly created 9th congressional district. Of the four candidates in the Republican primary, Warner came in second, losing to Brent Taylor. However, he narrowly won renomination to retain his state house seat. He then defeated Mai again in the general election.

=== Tenure ===
In 2021, the Federal Bureau of Investigation raided Warner's home and office, along with those of three other current and former Tennessee legislators. The searches were part of a federal investigation into alleged campaign finance violations. According to Warner's defense attorney, he was not charged with any crimes. Later that year, Warner and Mike Bell proposed the Tennessee Firearm Protection Act, a bill restricting the state government's ability to assist the federal government's enforcement of firearms regulations.

In 2023, Warner supported a resolution to expel three Democratic lawmakers from the legislature for violating decorum rules. The expulsion was widely characterized as unprecedented.

In 2025, Warner broke with the majority of his party to oppose the Freedom Scholarship Act proposed by Bill Lee that significantly expanded school vouchers. He has since continued voting against funding increases to the program.

==== Nashville airport renaming ====
Warner has twice supported legislation to rename Nashville International Airport. In 2025, Warner and Joey Hensley unsuccessfully introduced legislation to rename the airport after Donald Trump. The bill was defeated on a bipartisan basis in committee. The next year, following the death of Dolly Parton, Warner said he would introduce legislation to rename the airport after the artist. Later, Bill Lee announced his support for the idea and introduced plans for the renaming.

=== Committee assignments ===
==== Current ====
As of the 114th General Assembly, Warner sits on the following House Committees:

- Naming and Designating Committee (2021–2023, 2025–present)
- State and Local Government Committee (2025–present)
  - Public Service Subcommittee (2025–present)

==== Previous ====
Warner has previously been a member of the following House Committees:

- Education Administration Committee (2023–2025)
- Education Instruction Committee (2021–2025)
  - Education Instruction Subcommittee (2021–2025)
  - K–12 Subcommittee (2023–2025)
- Government Operations Committee (2021–2023)
  - Joint Government Operations Education, Health and General Welfare Subcommittee (2021–2023)

== Personal life ==
Warner lives in Chapel Hill. He is married to his wife Cindy, and has three children. He is a member of the Churches of Christ.

On August 13, 2021, a Nashville Metro water crew found Warner's nephew, James William Warner, murdered. In response, Warner described his nephew and the murder by saying "(He) loved life and loved people. It's just a tragic ending to something that should've never happened."

== Electoral history ==
Electoral history of Todd Warner
Year	Office	District	Party	Primary			General			Result	Ref.
Year	Office	District	Party	Total	%	P.	Total	%	P.	Result	Ref.
2020	Tennessee House of Representatives	92	Republican	3,991	47.25%	1st	23,212	100.00%	1st	Won	
2022	Tennessee House of Representatives	92	Republican	4,049	54.40%	1st	13,527	73.92%	1st	Won	
2024	Tennessee House of Representatives	92	Republican	5,870	100.00%	1st	25,086	74.54%	1st	Won	
2026	United States House of Representatives	9	Republican	17,776	26.35%	2nd	—	—	—	Lost	
2026	Tennessee House of Representatives	92	Republican	4,430	52.17%	1st	13,512	62.56%	1st	Won	
