= Beth Gardner Helfrich =

North Carolina politician

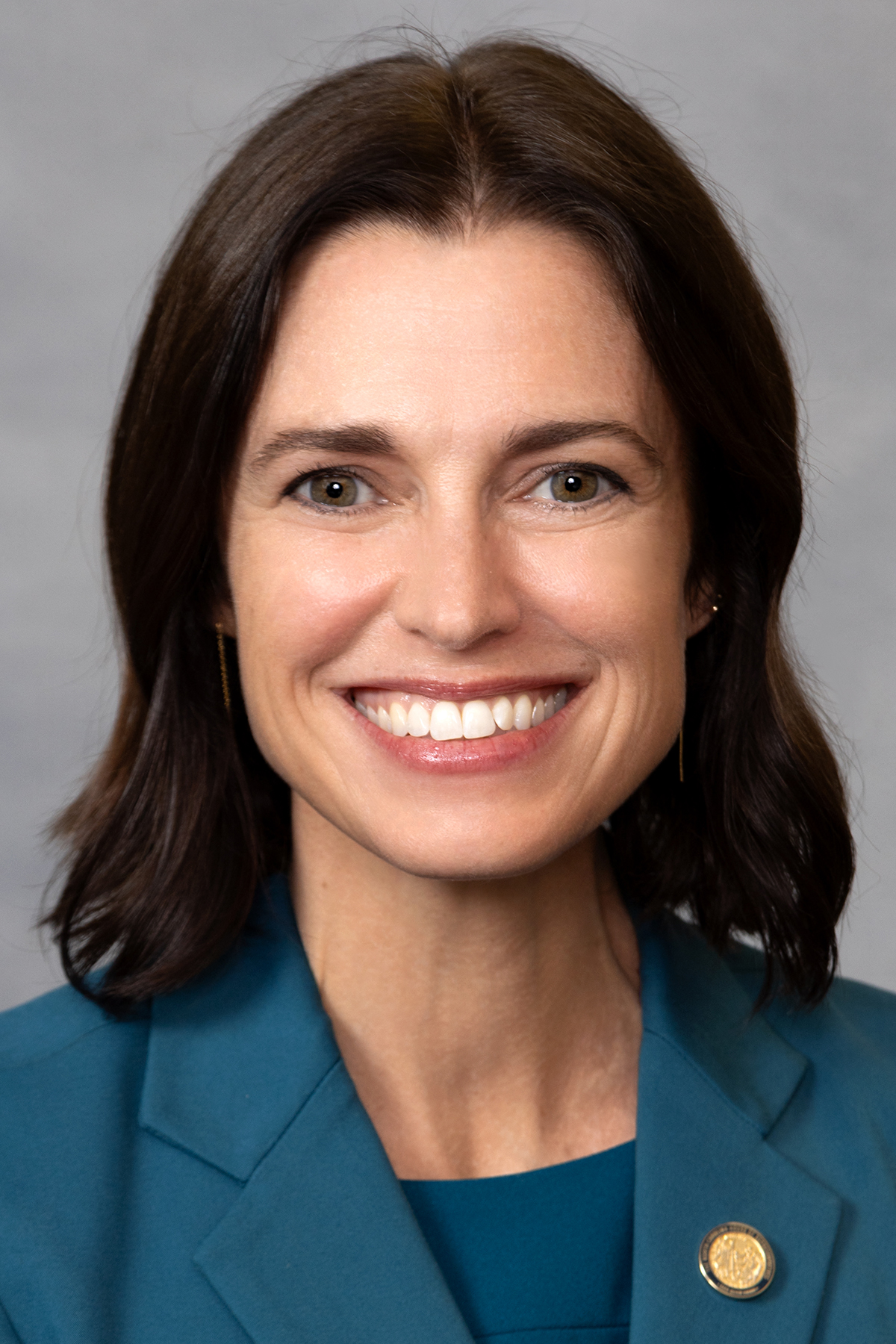
- Helfrich in 2025

Member of the North Carolina House of Representatives from the 98th district
- Incumbent
- Assumed office January 8, 2025
- Preceded by: John R. Bradford III

Personal details
- Born: January 21, 1981 (age 45)
- Party: Democratic
- Spouse: Tim Helfrich
- Children: 5
- Education: Davidson College

Beth Gardner Helfrich (born January 21, 1981) is an American politician who has been a member of the North Carolina General Assembly since 2025. A member of the Democratic Party, she represents North Carolina's 98th House district.

Helfrich defeated former Huntersville mayor Melinda Bales in 2024, flipping the seat from Republican control after the previous incumbent, John R. Bradford III, did not run for re-election. In 2026, she was challenged unsuccessfully by John W. Rhodes, who previously held this seat.

== Life and career ==
Helfrich graduated from Davidson College in 2003, where she majored in theater. She has five children and is a third-generation Davidson resident.

Helfrich is a former teacher and served as the Head of the Upper School at Woodlawn School, where she created the school's theater program. She also worked as Events and Communications Manager at a local Davidson bookstore, Main Street Books. Her husband, Tim Helfrich, is an owner of Summit Coffee, a coffee company headquartered in Davidson.

== Electoral history ==
=== 2026 ===
North Carolina House of Representatives 98th district Democratic general election, 2026
| Party | Candidate | Votes | % |
|---|---|---|---|
| Democratic | Beth Gardner Helfrich | 23,498 | 60.08% |
| Republican | John W. Rhodes | 15,612 | 39.92% |
| Total votes | | 39,110 | 100% |

=== 2024 ===
North Carolina House of Representatives 98th district Democratic primary election, 2024
| Party | Candidate | Votes | % |
|---|---|---|---|
| Democratic | Beth Gardner Helfrich | 3,997 | 65.55% |
| Democratic | Lisa Jewel | 2,101 | 34.45% |
| Total votes | | 6,098 | 100% |

North Carolina House of Representatives 98th district general election, 2024
| Party | Candidate | Votes | % |
|---|---|---|---|
| Democratic | Beth Gardner Helfrich | 27,083 | 52.20% |
| Republican | Melinda Bales | 24,800 | 47.80% |
| Total votes | | 51,883 | 100% |
| Democratic gain from Republican | | | |
