= Rick Tillis =

American politician (born 1963)

Member of the Tennessee House of Representatives from the 92nd district
- In office January 10, 2017 – January 12, 2021
- Preceded by: Billy Spivey
- Succeeded by: Todd Warner

Personal details
- Born: Thomas Richard Tillis; September 22, 1963 (age 62) Jacksonville, Florida, U.S.
- Party: Republican
- Spouse: Terry
- Relatives: Thom Tillis (brother)
- Occupation: Politician; jeweler

Thomas Richard Tillis (born September 22, 1963) is an American politician who served in the Tennessee House of Representatives from the 92nd district as a member of the Republican Party. During his tenure in the state house, he served as the Majority Whip.

Tillis, who is the brother of US Senator Thom Tillis, received a GED from the Florida Department of Education. He was elected to the state house in Tennessee in the 2016 election and served until he was defeated in the 2020 Republican primary by Todd Warner. Tillis served as the Majority Whip from 2018 to his resignation in 2019, after it had been discovered that he was running a Twitter account critical of other Republicans in the state house.

== Early life ==
Thomas Richard Tillis was born on September 22, 1963, to Margie and Thomas Raymond Tillis. He received a GED from the Florida Department of Education. His brother, Thom Tillis, was elected as a United States Senator from North Carolina.

== Tennessee House of Representatives ==
=== Elections ===
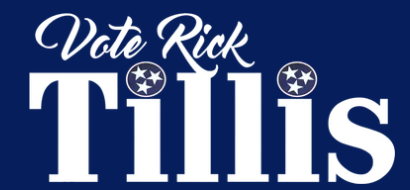
Rick Tillis' campaign logo

Tillis ran for the Republican nomination for a seat in the Tennessee House of Representatives from the 92nd district in the 2016 election. He defeated Michael Waggoner by forty votes and defeated Democratic nominee Tamra King in the election. In the 2018 election he defeated Billy Spivey in the Republican primary and Democratic nominee C.S. Coffey in the election. Tillis ran for reelection in the 2020 election, but was defeated by Todd Warner in the Republican primary making him one of four incumbents in the state house to lose renomination.

=== Tenure ===
Tillis introduced his first bill in 2017, which attempted to reduce the size of the Tennessee government and it was passed by the state house. During his tenure he served on the Local, State, and Finance, Ways, and Means committees.

During the 2018 United States Senate election Tillis filed a complaint to the United States Office of Special Counsel calling for an investigation into Phil Bredesen's campaign treasurer, Virginia Lodge, for appearing in a campaign ad. Tillis' complaint alleged that Lodge, who was a board member of the Tennessee Valley Authority, was in violation of the Hatch Act by serving as the treasure of Bredesen's campaign while also serving as a federal employee. He stated that being a treasurer was not in violation of the act, but appearing in advertisements was a violation.

In 2018, Tillis was selected by the Republican caucus to serve as the Majority Whip of the Tennessee House of Representatives. In August 2019, House Majority Leader William Lamberth and Representative Andy Holt stated that Tillis had admitted to running an account on Twitter which criticized other Republican members of the Tennessee House of Representatives. On August 30, Representative Jeremy Faison, the chairman of the GOP House caucus, announced in an email that Tillis had stepped down as the Majority Whip. On January 27, 2020, Johnny Garrett was selected to replace Tillis as the Majority Whip.

== Electoral history ==
2016 Tennessee House of Representatives 92nd district election
Primary election
Party	Candidate	Votes	%
Republican	Rick Tillis	2,344	50.43%
Republican	Michael P. Waggoner	2,304	49.57%
Total votes		4,648	100.00%
General election
Republican	Rick Tillis	16,475	74.32%
Democratic	Tamra King	5,693	25.68%
Total votes		22,168	100.00%

2018 Tennessee House of Representatives 92nd district election
Primary election
Party	Candidate	Votes	%
Republican	Rick Tillis (incumbent)	4,788	57.18%
Republican	Billy Spivey	3,586	42.82%
Total votes		8,374	100.00%
General election
Republican	Rick Tillis (incumbent)	14,249	75.13%
Democratic	C.S. Coffey	4,717	24.87%
Total votes		18,966	100.00%

2020 Tennessee House of Representatives 92nd district Republican primary
Party	Candidate	Votes	%
Republican	Todd Warner	3,991	47.25%
Republican	Rick Tillis (incumbent)	3,304	39.11%
Republican	Vincent A. Cuevas	1,152	13.64%
Total votes		8,447	100.00%

Tennessee House of Representatives
Preceded by Billy Spivey	Member of the Tennessee House of Representatives from the 92nd district 2017–2021	Succeeded by Todd Warner
