= Lee Reeves (politician) =

American politician (born 1977)

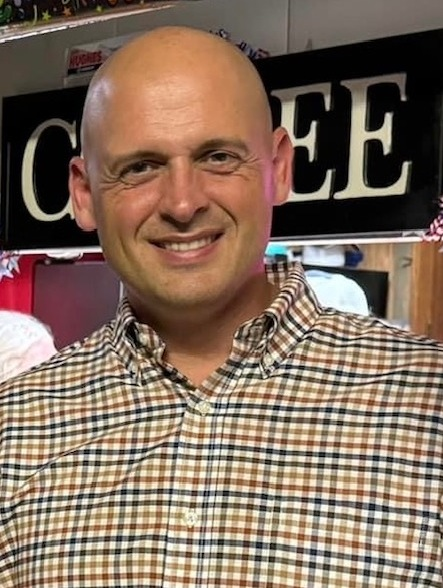
- Reeves in 2025

Member of the Tennessee House of Representatives from the 65th district
- Incumbent
- Assumed office January 14, 2025
- Preceded by: Sam Whitson

Personal details
- Born: October 3, 1977 (age 49) Bowling Green, Kentucky, U.S.
- Party: Republican
- Spouse: Claire Reeves
- Children: 3
- Education: Emory University (BA); Georgetown University (JD)
- Website: House website Campaign website

Lee Reeves (born October 3, 1977) is an American politician. A member of the Republican Party, Reeves serves in the Tennessee House of Representatives. He has represented the 65th district since 2025.

Reeves ran in the Republican primary for Tennessee's 7th congressional district in the October 7, 2025, special election. He suspended his campaign on October 3, 2025, and endorsed Matt Van Epps a few hours after President Donald Trump announced his endorsement of Van Epps.

Reeves graduated from Emory University and Georgetown University Law Center. He works in real estate, first as an attorney, then as an investor and small business owner.

Sam Whitson, the incumbent state representative for District 65, announced that he would not run for re-election in 2024. Reeves announced his candidacy to succeed him. Reeves won the election and was sworn into office on January 15, 2025.

Following the resignation of Mark Green from the United States House of Representatives, Reeves announced his candidacy in the special election to succeed him as the representative for Tennessee's 7th congressional district. Reeves ran as a Trump conservative Republican, supporting President Trump's immigration policies. Following President Donald Trump's endorsement of Matt Van Epps for the seat, Reeves withdrew from the special election and also endorsed Matt Van Epps.
