= Glencliff High School =

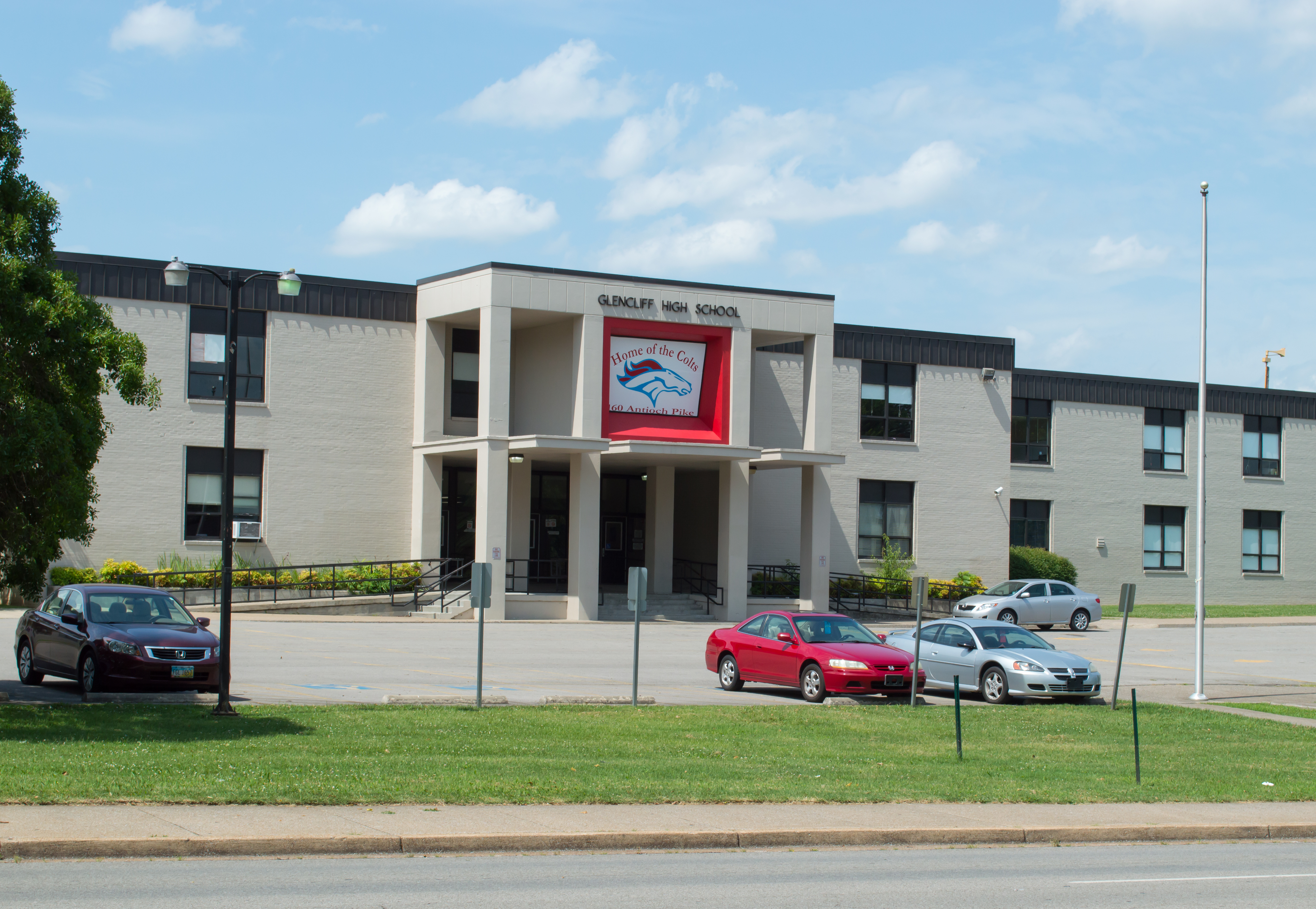

Location
- 160 Antioch Pike; Nashville, Tennessee 37211; United States
- Coordinates: 36°06′07″N 86°43′38″W

Information
- School type: Public, High school
- Established: 1957; 69 years ago
- School district: Metro Nashville Public Schools
- Principal: Clint Wilson
- Teaching staff: 62.72
- Grades: 9–12
- Enrollment: 1,077 (2023–2024)
- Student to teacher ratio: 17.17
- Colors: Columbia blue and red
- Nickname: Colts
- Website: glencliffhigh.mnps.org

Glencliff High School is an American public high school in Nashville, Tennessee. It was built in 1957 and added onto in 1977.

== History ==
According to the 1963 Roundup (school yearbook), the area in which Glencliff High School is located was until recent years fertile farmland lying on the outskirts of Nashville. This section remained largely unpopulated until the late 1950s, at which time industrial expansion and metropolitan growth led to extensive residential development, which yet continues to characterize this area. Dominated by such industrial and commercial establishments as AVCO, Aladdin Industries, and the Municipal Airport, the area inevitably grew, attracting secondary businesses, churches, schools, and finally a high school.

Glencliff High School takes its name from the Glencliff Estate. The site of the school is a part of the original property of one of Nashville's oldest families, W. A. Woodroof. The Glencliff Mansion, which is still standing on what is the Mill Creek Valley Road (old name) or Antioch Pike (new name), was the home of that family. The house predates the American Civil War, and within the vicinity of it General Buell amassed his forces during the Battle of Nashville.

Glencliff High School for the first time in 1957 opened its doors to receive 350 seventh and eighth graders and 13 faculty members. Five years later, the spring of 1962, the first senior class composed of 125 members was graduated. The school now has a student body of around 1,200 students and 70 faculty members.

Glencliff High School is one of the most diverse schools in Tennessee. There are more than 42 different nationalities and 26 languages represented in its student population. It has four academies — the Freshman Academy, the Academy of Medical Science and Research (AMSR), the Ford Academy of Business and Innovation (FABI), and the Hands on Nashville Academy for Environmental and Urban Planning (HONEUP). Students are taught skills in courses like webpage design, engineering and medical terminology. They can participate in the dual-credit program with Nashville State Community College to earn credits in personal finance, medical terminology and agricultural science.

The culinary arts program is one of Glencliff's programs.

Outside of the academies, Glencliff offers Advanced Placement (AP) classes and special college-prep support (AVID) for students who have college aspirations and are in the academic middle.

There are opportunities for students to participate in field trips, competitions and practical experience. Business partners extend opportunities to students to participate in career fairs, job shadowing and internships, and there are also various sports teams and clubs.

=== Staff members ===
Glencliff is administered and represented by:

- Executive Principal: Clint Wilson
- Asst. Principal for Freshman Academy: Lane Hamnett
- Asst. Principal for the Academy of Health and hospitality : Suzanne Link
- Asst. Principal for the Ford Academy of Business and Innovation: Nick Wilson
- Assistant Principal for the Hands on Nashville Academy of Environmental and Urban Planning and Biotechnology: Jonathan Hall
- Senior Counselor: Ellen Houston
- School Board Representative: Freda Player-Peters

B. H. Thompson, first principal of Glencliff, had deep roots in Davidson County having coached for 21 years prior to becoming principal. His education background included a Master of Science and Bachelor of Science from Middle Tennessee State College.

== Notable alumni ==
- Cynthia Rhodes, singer/actress
- Sam Whitson, Tennessee politician
