= Christy Underwood Clark =

American politician from North Carolina

Christy Clark
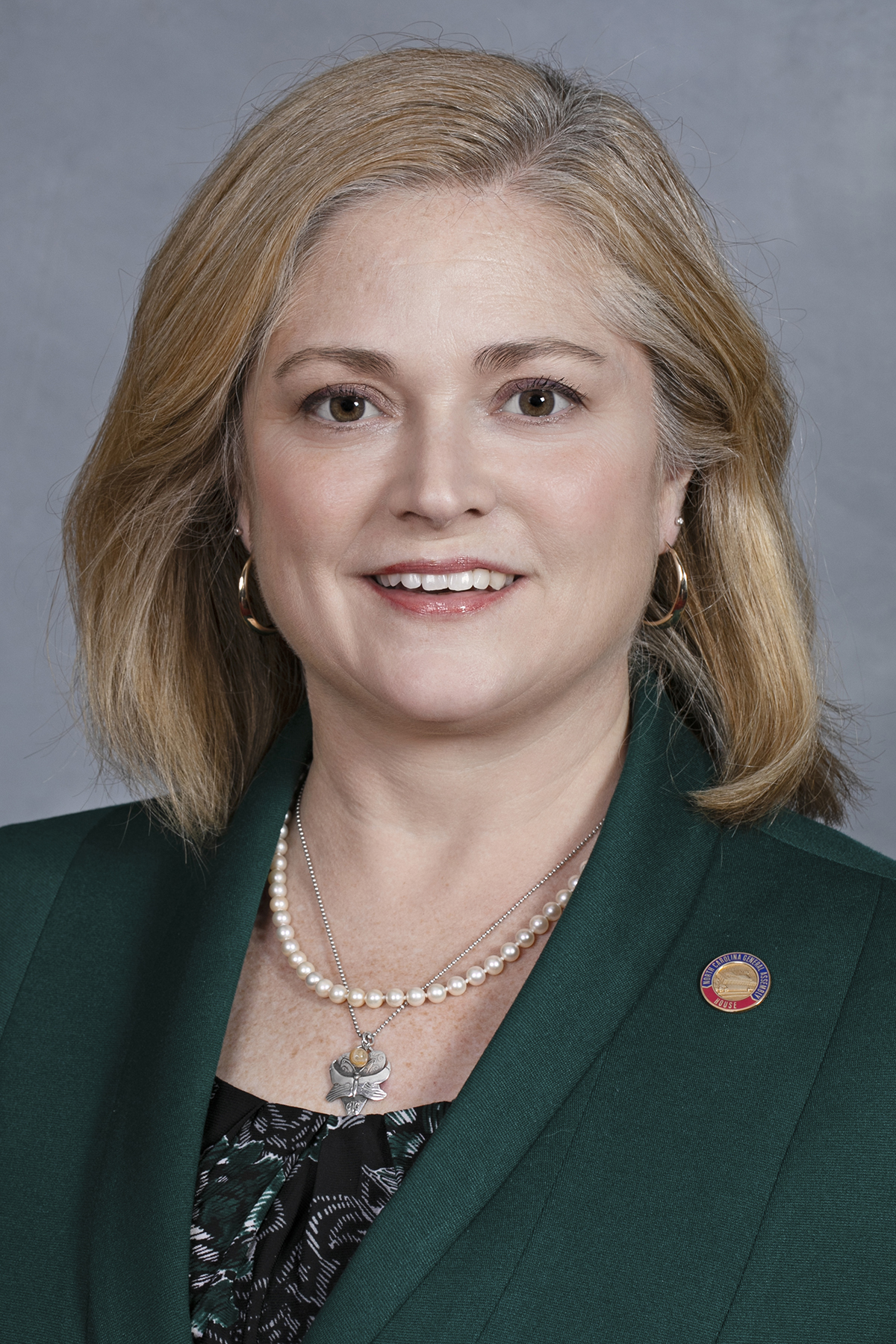

Mayor of Huntersville
- Incumbent
- Assumed office December 4, 2023
- Preceded by: Melinda Bales

Member of the North Carolina House of Representatives from the 98th district
- In office January 1, 2019 – January 1, 2021
- Preceded by: John Bradford
- Succeeded by: John Bradford

Personal details
- Born: Christy Underwood; June 23, 1971 (age 55) Roanoke, Virginia
- Party: Democratic
- Spouse: Matthew Laas (div.) Christopher Clark (2010-present)
- Children: 5
- Education: Roanoke College
- Occupation: Educator

Christy Underwood Clark is an American politician who has served as the mayor of Huntersville since December 2023. A member of the Democratic Party, Clark represented District 98 in the North Carolina House of Representatives from 2019 until 2021. She was an unsuccessful candidate for the same seat in the 2022 election.

In 2023, she was the successful candidate for the Mayor of Huntersville, NC.

== Political career ==
Clark was first elected to represent District 98 in the North Carolina House of Representatives in 2018, unseating Republican incumbent John Bradford in a very close race. She ran for re-election in 2020, but lost to Bradford in a rematch.

Clark previously was a member of the following committees:

- Agriculture
- Appropriations, Capital
- Environment
- Judiciary
- Judiciary Subcommittee on Criminal Matters
- Regulatory Reform

Clark was elected as Mayor of Huntersville, NC in 2023.

=== Electoral history ===
==== 2023 ====
Huntersville Mayoral election, 2023
Candidate	Votes	%
Christy Clark	4,925	48.56%
Dan Boone	3,462	34.13%
Derek Partee	1,740	17.15%
Write-in	16	0.16%
Total votes	10,143	100%

==== 2022 ====
North Carolina House of Representatives 98th district general election, 2022
Party	Candidate	Votes	%
Republican	John Bradford (incumbent)	18,080	50.93%
Democratic	Christy Clark	17,420	49.07%
Total votes		35,500	100%
Republican hold			

==== 2020 ====
North Carolina House of Representatives 98th district general election, 2020
Party	Candidate	Votes	%
Republican	John Bradford	31,793	51.67%
Democratic	Christy Clark (incumbent)	29,743	48.33%
Total votes		61,536	100%
Republican gain from Democratic			

==== 2018 ====
North Carolina House of Representatives 98th district Democratic primary election, 2018
Party	Candidate	Votes	%
Democratic	Christy Clark	3,275	90.32%
Democratic	Branden Rosenlieb	351	9.68%
Total votes		3,626	100%

North Carolina House of Representatives 98th district general election, 2018
Party	Candidate	Votes	%
Democratic	Christy Clark	20,033	50.52%
Republican	John Bradford (incumbent)	19,618	49.48%
Total votes		39,651	100%
Democratic gain from Republican			

North Carolina House of Representatives
Preceded by John Bradford	Member of the North Carolina House of Representatives from the 98th district 2019-2021	Succeeded by John Bradford
