= Tennessee House of Representatives 92nd district =

State legislative district in Tennessee

Tennessee's 92nd State House of Representatives district
- Map of Tennessee House districts, with the 92nd District shaded in red
Representative
Todd Warner; R–Chapel Hill
- Demographics: 82% White; 5% Black; 8% Hispanic; 1% Asian <1% Native American <1% Hawaiian/Pacific Islander; 3% Other; 8% Multiracial
- Population: 76,408

Tennessee House of Representatives 92nd district is one of 99 legislative districts in the lower house of the Tennessee Legislature. It includes Marshall County and parts of Williamson County.

The district's current representative is Todd Warner, who was first elected in 2020.

== History ==
The 92nd district was originally established in 1973. From 1973 to 2013, it comprised parts of Shelby County. From 2013 to 2023, it comprised all of Marshall County with parts of Franklin County, Marion County, and Lincoln County. Since 2023, it has comprised all of Marshall County and part of Williamson County.

== Demographics ==
- 82% of the district's population is White
- 5% of the district's population is Black
- 8% of the district's population is Hispanic
- 1% of the district's population is Asian
- 8% of the district's population is two or more races
- 3% of the district's population is of another race

== Representatives ==
Representatives	Party	Years of service	Hometown
District established January 9, 1973
Alvin King	Democratic	January 9, 1973 – January 12, 1993	Memphis
Henri Brooks	Democratic	January 12, 1993 – December 31, 2006 (Note: Brooks resigned her seat before the expiration of her final term; Hardaway won the special election to replace her.)	Memphis
Vacant
G. A. Hardaway	Democratic	March 13, 2007 – January 8, 2013 (Note: Hardaway remained a member of the legislature after being redistricted to the 93rd district.)	Memphis
redistricting from Shelby County to Franklin, Marshall, Marion, and Lincoln counties
Billy Spivey	Republican	January 8, 2013 – January 9, 2017	Lewisburg
Rick Tillis	Republican	January 9, 2017 – January 12, 2021	Lewisburg
Todd Warner	Republican	January 12, 2021 – present	Chapel Hill

== Elections ==
=== 2020 ===
2020 General election
Party	Candidate	Votes	%
Republican	Todd Warner	23,212	100%
Total votes		23,212	100%
Republican hold			

=== 2018 ===
2018 General election
Party	Candidate	Votes	%
Republican	Rick Tillis (Incumbent)	14,249	75.01%
Democratic	C.S. "Scott" Coffey	4,747	24.99%
Total votes		18,996	100%
Republican hold			
