= John R. Bradford =

American politician from North Carolina (born 1974)

John R. Bradford, III
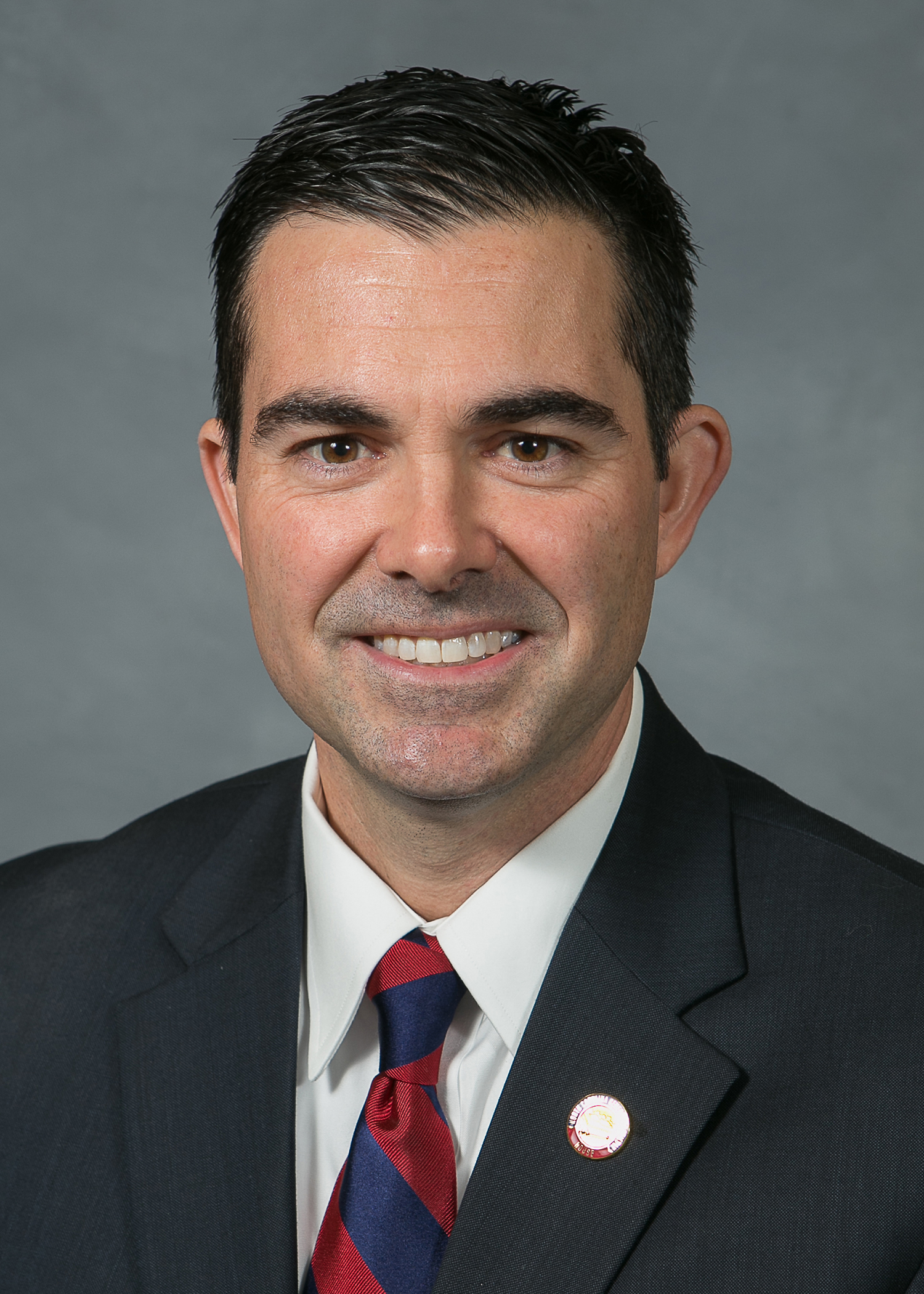

Member of the North Carolina House of Representatives from the 98th district
- In office January 1, 2021 – January 1, 2025
- Preceded by: Christy Clark
- Succeeded by: Beth Gardner Helfrich
- In office January 1, 2015 – January 1, 2019
- Preceded by: Thom Tillis
- Succeeded by: Christy Clark

Personal details
- Born: John Ray Bradford III; September 9, 1974 (age 52) South Carolina, U.S.
- Party: Republican
- Spouse: Shea Hedinger
- Education: Clemson University (BS); University of Memphis (MBA)

John Ray Bradford III (born September 9, 1974) is a former member of the North Carolina General Assembly representing the state's 98th House district, including constituents in Mecklenburg County. Bradford, a Republican succeeded Thom Tillis after his successful run for the United States Senate in 2014.

Bradford served four elected terms in the NC House of Representatives. He was the Freshman Majority Whip his first term. He was the Senior Chairman of the House Finance Committee during his third and fourth terms. He also served as a Chairman of Local Government, Regulatory Reform and the Alcohol Beverage Control Committees. After completing his second term, Bradford lost his 2018 re-election campaign to Democrat Christy Clark of Huntersville by 415 votes. In 2020, he would later regain his seat by beating Clark in a rematch and win yet another rematch against Clark in 2022. Bradford unsuccessfully ran for Congress in North Carolina's 8th congressional district in 2024, losing the Republican nomination to eventual winner Mark Harris.

== Life and career ==
Bradford earned his bachelor's degree in engineering from Clemson University in 1996 and his MBA from the University of Memphis in 2000. He is the founder of Park Avenue Properties, a property management business, and sold it to PURE Property Management in 2020. He is the founder and CEO of petscreening.com which launched in 2017. Bradford is also the inventor of FidoAlert and TabbyAlert, a nationwide texting alert network for lost pets. Bradford uses his current company's profits to fund the alert network, making it free to pet owners nationwide.

== Electoral history ==
=== 2024 ===
North Carolina's 8th congressional district Republican primary election, 2024
Party	Candidate	Votes	%
Republican	Mark Harris	24,764	30.45%
Republican	Allan Baucom	21,964	27.00%
Republican	John Bradford	14,458	17.78%
Republican	Don Brown	8,519	10.47%
Republican	Leigh Brown	7,845	9.65%
Republican	Chris Maples	3,787	4.66%
Total votes		81,337	100%

=== 2022 ===
North Carolina House of Representatives 98th district general election, 2022
Party	Candidate	Votes	%
Republican	John Bradford (incumbent)	18,080	50.93%
Democratic	Christy Clark	17,420	49.07%
Total votes		35,500	100%
Republican gain from Democratic			

=== 2020 ===
North Carolina House of Representatives 98th district general election, 2020
Party	Candidate	Votes	%
Republican	John Bradford	31,793	51.67%
Democratic	Christy Clark (incumbent)	29,743	48.33%
Total votes		61,536	100%
Republican gain from Democratic			

=== 2018 ===
North Carolina House of Representatives 98th district general election, 2018
Party	Candidate	Votes	%
Democratic	Christy Clark	20,033	50.52%
Republican	John Bradford (incumbent)	19,618	49.48%
Total votes		39,651	100%
Democratic gain from Republican			

=== 2016 ===
North Carolina House of Representatives 98th district general election, 2016
Party	Candidate	Votes	%
Republican	John Bradford (incumbent)	25,428	56.48%
Unaffiliated	Jane Campbell	19,597	43.52%
Total votes		45,025	100%
Republican hold			

=== 2014 ===
North Carolina House of Representatives 98th district Republican primary election, 2014
Party	Candidate	Votes	%
Republican	John Bradford	2,536	59.14%
Republican	Lynette D. Rinker	1,153	26.89%
Republican	Sharon Hudson	599	13.97%
Total votes		4,288	100%

North Carolina House of Representatives 98th district general election, 2014
Party	Candidate	Votes	%
Republican	John Bradford	14,558	54.98%
Democratic	Natasha Marcus	11,922	45.02%
Total votes		26,480	100%
Republican hold			

North Carolina House of Representatives
Preceded by Thom Tillis	Member of the North Carolina House of Representatives from the 98th district 2015–2019	Succeeded by Christy Clark
Preceded by Christy Clark	Member of the North Carolina House of Representatives from the 98th district 2021–2025	Succeeded by Beth Gardner Helfrich
