= North Carolina's 98th House district =

American legislative district

North Carolina's 98th State House of Representatives district
Representative
| Beth Helfrich; D–Davidson |
- Demographics: 78% White; 7% Black; 5% Hispanic; 5% Asian; 5% Multiracial
- Population (2024): 85,351

North Carolina's 98th House district is one of 120 districts in the North Carolina House of Representatives. It has been represented by Democrat Beth Helfrich since 2025.

== Geography ==
Since 2003, the district has included part of Mecklenburg County. The district overlaps with the 37th and 38th Senate districts.

== District officeholders ==
| Representative | Party | Dates | Notes | Counties |
|---|---|---|---|---|
| District created January 1, 1993. | | | | 1993–2003; Parts of Columbus, Brunswick, New Hanover, and Pender counties. |
| Thomas Wright (Wilmington) | Democratic | January 1, 1993 – January 1, 2003 | Redistricted to the 18th district. | 1993–2003; Parts of Columbus, Brunswick, New Hanover, and Pender counties. |
| John Rhodes (Cornelius) | Republican | January 1, 2003 – January 1, 2007 | Lost re-nomination. | 2003–Present; Part of Mecklenburg County. |
| Thom Tillis (Cornelius) | Republican | January 1, 2007 – January 1, 2015 | Retired to run for U.S. Senate. | 2003–Present; Part of Mecklenburg County. |
| John Bradford (Cornelius) | Republican | January 1, 2015 – January 1, 2019 | Lost re-election. | 2003–Present; Part of Mecklenburg County. |
| Christy Clark (Huntersville) | Democratic | January 1, 2019 – January 1, 2021 | Lost re-election. | 2003–Present; Part of Mecklenburg County. |
| John Bradford (Cornelius) | Republican | January 1, 2021 – January 1, 2025 | Retired to run for Congress. | 2003–Present; Part of Mecklenburg County. |
| Beth Helfrich (Davidson) | Democratic | January 1, 2025 – Present | | 2003–Present; Part of Mecklenburg County. |

== Election results ==
=== 2024 ===
North Carolina House of Representatives 98th district Democratic primary election, 2024
| Party | Candidate | Votes | % |
|---|---|---|---|
| Democratic | Beth Helfrich | 3,997 | 65.55% |
| Democratic | Lisa Jewel | 2,101 | 34.45% |
| Total votes | | 6,098 | 100% |

North Carolina House of Representatives 98th district general election, 2024
| Party | Candidate | Votes | % |
|---|---|---|---|
| Democratic | Beth Helfrich | 27,083 | 52.20% |
| Republican | Melinda Bales | 24,800 | 47.80% |
| Total votes | | 51,883 | 100% |
| Democratic gain from Republican | | | |

=== 2022 ===
North Carolina House of Representatives 98th district general election, 2022
| Party | Candidate | Votes | % |
|---|---|---|---|
| Republican | John Bradford (incumbent) | 18,080 | 50.93% |
| Democratic | Christy Clark | 17,420 | 49.07% |
| Total votes | | 35,500 | 100% |
| Republican hold | | | |

=== 2020 ===
North Carolina House of Representatives 98th district general election, 2020
| Party | Candidate | Votes | % |
|---|---|---|---|
| Republican | John Bradford | 31,793 | 51.67% |
| Democratic | Christy Clark (incumbent) | 29,743 | 48.33% |
| Total votes | | 61,536 | 100% |
| Republican gain from Democratic | | | |

=== 2018 ===
North Carolina House of Representatives 98th district Democratic primary election, 2018
| Party | Candidate | Votes | % |
|---|---|---|---|
| Democratic | Christy Clark | 3,275 | 90.32% |
| Democratic | Branden Rosenlieb | 351 | 9.68% |
| Total votes | | 3,626 | 100% |

North Carolina House of Representatives 98th district general election, 2018
| Party | Candidate | Votes | % |
|---|---|---|---|
| Democratic | Christy Clark | 20,033 | 50.52% |
| Republican | John Bradford (incumbent) | 19,618 | 49.48% |
| Total votes | | 39,651 | 100% |
| Democratic gain from Republican | | | |

=== 2016 ===
North Carolina House of Representatives 98th district general election, 2016
| Party | Candidate | Votes | % |
|---|---|---|---|
| Republican | John Bradford (incumbent) | 25,428 | 56.48% |
| Independent | Jane Campbell | 19,597 | 43.52% |
| Total votes | | 45,025 | 100% |
| Republican hold | | | |

=== 2014 ===
North Carolina House of Representatives 98th district Republican primary election, 2014
| Party | Candidate | Votes | % |
|---|---|---|---|
| Republican | John Bradford | 2,536 | 59.14% |
| Republican | Lynette D. Rinker | 1,153 | 26.89% |
| Republican | Sharon Hudson | 599 | 13.97% |
| Total votes | | 4,288 | 100% |

North Carolina House of Representatives 98th district general election, 2014
| Party | Candidate | Votes | % |
|---|---|---|---|
| Republican | John Bradford | 14,558 | 54.98% |
| Democratic | Natasha Marcus | 11,922 | 45.02% |
| Total votes | | 26,480 | 100% |
| Republican hold | | | |

=== 2012 ===
North Carolina House of Representatives 98th district general election, 2012
| Party | Candidate | Votes | % |
|---|---|---|---|
| Republican | Thom Tillis (incumbent) | 27,971 | 100% |
| Total votes | | 27,971 | 100% |
| Republican hold | | | |

=== 2010 ===
North Carolina House of Representatives 98th district general election, 2010
| Party | Candidate | Votes | % |
|---|---|---|---|
| Republican | Thom Tillis (incumbent) | 23,540 | 100% |
| Total votes | | 23,540 | 100% |
| Republican hold | | | |

=== 2008 ===
North Carolina House of Representatives 98th district general election, 2008
| Party | Candidate | Votes | % |
|---|---|---|---|
| Republican | Thom Tillis (incumbent) | 38,875 | 100% |
| Total votes | | 38,875 | 100% |
| Republican hold | | | |

=== 2006 ===
North Carolina House of Representatives 98th district Republican primary election, 2006
| Party | Candidate | Votes | % |
|---|---|---|---|
| Republican | Thom Tillis | 1,805 | 62.98% |
| Republican | John Rhodes (incumbent) | 1,061 | 37.02% |
| Total votes | | 2,866 | 100% |

North Carolina House of Representatives 98th district general election, 2006
| Party | Candidate | Votes | % |
|---|---|---|---|
| Republican | Thom Tillis | 14,479 | 100% |
| Total votes | | 14,479 | 100% |
| Republican hold | | | |

=== 2004 ===
North Carolina House of Representatives 98th district general election, 2004
| Party | Candidate | Votes | % |
|---|---|---|---|
| Republican | John Rhodes (incumbent) | 27,830 | 100% |
| Total votes | | 27,830 | 100% |
| Republican hold | | | |

=== 2002 ===
North Carolina House of Representatives 98th district general election, 2002
| Party | Candidate | Votes | % |
|---|---|---|---|
| Republican | John Rhodes | 13,661 | 57.92% |
| Democratic | David H. Dunn | 9,927 | 42.08% |
| Total votes | | 23,588 | 100% |
| Republican win (new seat) | | | |

=== 2000 ===
North Carolina House of Representatives 98th district general election, 2000
| Party | Candidate | Votes | % |
|---|---|---|---|
| Democratic | Thomas Wright (incumbent) | 16,058 | 100% |
| Total votes | | 16,058 | 100% |
| Democratic hold | | | |
