= Thom Tillis =

American politician (born 1960)

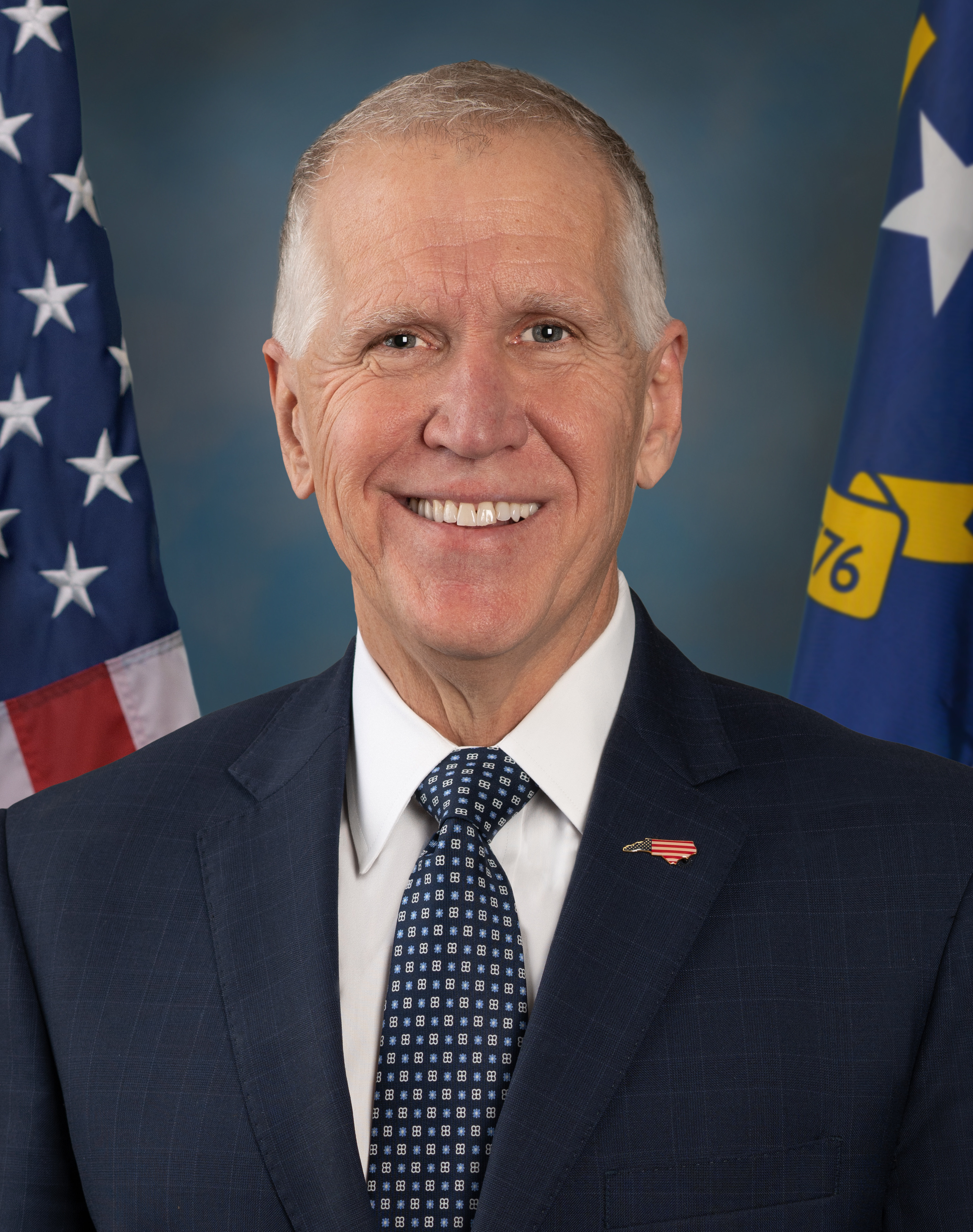
- Official portrait, 2022

United States Senator from North Carolina
- Incumbent
- Assumed office January 3, 2015 Serving with Ted Budd
- Preceded by: Kay Hagan

Speaker of the North Carolina House of Representatives
- In office January 26, 2011 – January 3, 2015
- Preceded by: Joe Hackney
- Succeeded by: Tim Moore

Member of the North Carolina House of Representatives from the 98th district
- In office January 1, 2007 – January 1, 2015
- Preceded by: John Rhodes
- Succeeded by: John Bradford

Personal details
- Born: Thomas Roland Tillis; August 30, 1960 (age 66) Jacksonville, Florida, U.S.
- Party: Republican
- Spouse: Susan Tillis (m. 1987)
- Children: 2
- Relatives: Rick Tillis (brother)
- Education: Chattanooga State Community College (attended); University of Maryland, University College (BS)
- Website: Senate website Campaign website
- Tillis's voice Tillis opposing a national emergency declaration on the Southern border Recorded February 26, 2019

Thomas Roland Tillis (/ˈtɪlɪs/ TIL-iss, born August 30, 1960) is an American businessman and politician who has served as a United States senator from North Carolina since 2015. He did not seek another term in the 2026 election. From 2007 to 2015, Tillis served in the North Carolina House of Representatives, of which he was speaker from 2011 to 2015. He is a member of the Republican Party.

Tillis was first elected to the United States Senate in 2014, defeating Democratic incumbent Kay Hagan, and was reelected in 2020. He became the state's senior U.S. senator when Richard Burr retired in 2023. Tillis serves on the Senate Security and Cooperation in Europe; Banking, Housing, and Urban Affairs; Finance; Judiciary; and Veterans' Affairs Committees. He chairs the Subcommittee on Personnel (Senate Armed Services Committee); the Subcommittee on Intellectual Property (Senate Judiciary Committee); and the Subcommittee on Taxation and IRS Oversight (Senate Finance Committee).

A moderate Republican, Tillis has voted for proposals such as the Bipartisan Safer Communities Act, which provided funding to states for red flag laws, and the Respect for Marriage Act, which repealed the Defense of Marriage Act. He supports a pathway to citizenship for undocumented immigrants, initially opposed President Donald Trump's national emergency declaration to divert funding to a border wall, and voted against Trump's One Big Beautiful Bill Act.

On June 29, 2025, Tillis announced that he would not seek reelection to a third term in 2026.

== Early life and education ==
Tillis was born in Jacksonville, Florida, the son of Margie and Thomas Raymond Tillis, a boat draftsman. He was the oldest boy among six children, with three older sisters. By the time he was 17, his family had moved 20 times, living in New Orleans and Nashville, among other places; Tillis never attended the same school in consecutive years. Tillis, his father, and his two brothers are all named Thomas Tillis. One of his brothers, Thomas "Rick" Tillis, served in the Tennessee House of Representatives.

Following his 1978 graduation from high school, Tillis left home to get a job. He then attended Chattanooga State Community College before receiving a Bachelor of Science in technology management from the University of Maryland University College in 1996.

== Business career ==
After graduating from Antioch High School in 1978, Tillis worked at Provident Life and Accident Insurance Co. in Chattanooga, Tennessee, helping computerize records in conjunction with Wang Laboratories, a computer company in Boston. Wang eventually hired Tillis to work in its Boston office. He spent two and a half years there before being transferred back to Chattanooga, and then Atlanta. In 1990, he was recruited to work for accounting and consulting firm Price Waterhouse. In 1996, Tillis was promoted to partner. In 1998, he and his family moved to Cornelius, North Carolina.

PricewaterhouseCoopers sold its consulting arm to IBM in 2002 and Tillis went to IBM as well. Tillis began his political career in 2002 in Cornelius, as he pushed for a local bike trail and was elected to the town's park board. He ran for town commissioner in 2003 and tied for second place.

== North Carolina House of Representatives ==
After a two-year term as town commissioner, Tillis ran for the General Assembly in 2006. He defeated incumbent John W. Rhodes in the Republican primary and went on to win the election unopposed. Tillis was reelected unopposed in 2008, 2010 and 2012. He formally left IBM in 2009. He was campaign chairman for the House Republican Caucus in 2010. After Republicans won a majority in the North Carolina House for the first time since 1998, Tillis was chosen as Speaker, the fifth Republican to hold the role, and was unanimously reelected in 2013. Governing magazine named Tillis and North Carolina Senate President pro tempore Phil Berger "GOP Legislators to Watch" in 2011.

The state house overseen by Tillis restructured the state's tax code, redrew North Carolina's congressional districts, and passed legislation to sunset existing state rules and regulations and limit new regulations to ten years.

After Republican Pat McCrory was elected governor in 2012, Tillis presided over legislation reducing early voting days, invalidating ballots cast outside one's precinct, and requiring specific kinds of photo ID in order to vote. A top Tillis aide had previously requested data on photo ID ownership by race, which showed that black people would be significantly more likely than white people to become unable to vote if such legislation passed. Tillis said he requested the data to ensure the bill would not violate federal laws against discrimination. The U.S. Fourth Circuit Court of Appeals struck down the restrictions, writing in its opinion that they "target African Americans with almost surgical precision".

In 2014, 14 people protesting cuts to the earned income tax credits program and Tillis's refusal to expand Medicaid were arrested after staging a sit-in in his office.

== U.S. Senate ==
=== Elections ===
==== 2014 ====
In 2014, Tillis announced that he would not seek reelection to the state House, instead running for U.S. Senate against first-term Democratic incumbent Kay Hagan. In the Republican primary, he was endorsed by former Florida Governor Jeb Bush, then-North Carolina Governor Pat McCrory, former presidential candidate Mitt Romney, and the U.S. Chamber of Commerce. The New York Times called Tillis a "favorite of the party establishment."

During his primary campaign, Tillis skipped four candidate forums and one of three televised primary debates in an effort to avoid lesser-known rivals, and to cement his image as the "inevitable nominee". Tillis was criticized during the Republican primary for raising money from groups lobbying the state House. On May 6, he won the nomination with 45.68% of the vote over Greg Brannon and Mark Harris, described as a victory for the Republican establishment over the insurgent Tea Party movement.

Tillis was announced the winner of the Senate race on November 4. He received 48.8% of the vote, the lowest winning total in North Carolina history for a U.S. Senate candidate; Hagan garnered 47.3%.

During the 2014 campaign, the Tillis campaign and the North Carolina Republican Party paid $345,000 to the data analysis firm Cambridge Analytica to microtarget voters. The company later touted their work on Tillis's campaign, including "psychographic profiles for all voters in North Carolina" that enabled "tailored messages" for particular audiences. Tillis's connections to the firm were scrutinized after revelations that its data had been illicitly harvested from Facebook.

In the 2014 election, Tillis received $22,888,975 in "dark money", which constituted 81% of non-party outside spending in support. OpenSecrets placed the final cost of outside spending at $8.5 million for Hagan and $35.5 million attacking Tillis, and $13.7 million for Tillis and $20.9 million attacking Hagan, placing the totals by candidate at $44 million for Hagan, and $34.6 million for Tillis.

==== 2020 ====
Tillis ran for and won reelection in 2020. He was challenged in the Republican primaries by conservative businessman Garland Tucker, who spent $1.3 million to finance his campaign before dropping out in December 2019, after Trump endorsed all incumbent Republican senators up for election in 2020, including Tillis. Tillis won the March 3 Republican primary and faced Democratic nominee Cal Cunningham in the November general election. Cunningham led Tillis in the polls for most of the year. In October 2020, Cunningham acknowledged having an extramarital affair and his lead in the polls was reduced to less than two points before election day. Tillis received 48.7% of the vote to Cunningham's 46.9%.

=== Tenure ===
After the release of the Access Hollywood tape during the 2016 United States presidential election, Tillis called Trump's comments "indefensible". According to Politico, he "began the Trump era by negotiating with Democrats on immigration and co-authoring legislation to protect special counsel Robert Mueller" but has increasingly aligned himself with the president due to pressure from his party. While occasionally criticizing Trump's tone, Tillis said in 2017 that he had "not deviated once from any nomination or any vote that the president happens to be supportive of" and has voted with Trump's stated positions 90% of the time as of January 2021.

In 2016, Tillis opposed filling the then Supreme Court vacancy until after the election, adding the nomination "would be best left to the next president." With around seven months until the 2016 presidential election, Tillis argued that the United States was "in the middle of a presidential election, and the Senate majority is giving the American people a voice to determine the direction of the Supreme Court". In September 2020, with less than two months to the next presidential election, Tillis supported an immediate vote on President Trump's nominee. The day after Supreme Court justice Ruth Bader Ginsburg's death, he said Trump would pick a "well-qualified and conservative jurist" while Democratic presidential candidate Joe Biden would pick a "liberal activist".

During the COVID-19 pandemic, Tillis apologized after he was spotted not wearing a face mask in a crowd during Trump's acceptance speech at the 2020 Republican National Convention, saying, "I fell short of my own standard." He was criticized after he suggested that Hispanic people were harder hit because they were less likely to wear masks and practice social distancing. Tillis tested positive for COVID-19 on October 2, 2020, after a White House event. He broadly supported Governor Roy Cooper's handling of COVID-19, an unusual stance for a prominent North Carolina Republican. He also took a stance against claims that North Carolina's COVID-19 case increases were due to migrants entering the state, saying, "the biggest factor right now is we have far too many people who are refusing to get the vaccine."

Analysts have generally regarded Tillis as a moderate Republican. In 2023, the North Carolina Republican Party voted to censure him, particularly over his stances on immigration and gay marriage.

In June 2025, Tillis was one of three Republican senators to oppose the One Big Beautiful Bill Act. After Trump criticized him, Tillis announced he would not seek reelection, saying, "In Washington over the last few years, it's become increasingly evident that leaders who are willing to embrace bipartisanship, compromise, and demonstrate independent thinking are becoming an endangered species."

In August 2026, Tillis announced a memoir, How to Lose Friends and Antagonize Presidents: The Trouble with Sycophants, Courage Outsourcing, and Partisan Groupthink, scheduled for publication in October 2026. In the book, Tillis criticizes several figures in the Trump administration and the Republican Party.

Tillis's sharp questioning in the Judiciary Committee led to the eventual firing of former Department of Homeland Security Secretary Kristi Noem after he asked her why she had spent hundreds of millions of dollars on advertisements in which she prominently featured.

=== Caucus memberships ===
- Senate Taiwan Caucus
- Senate Whistleblower Protection Caucus

== Political positions ==
=== Abortion ===
Tillis opposes abortion. In 2011, while serving as speaker of the North Carolina House of Representatives, he helped the House pass a law, later struck down by the courts, requiring abortion providers to perform an ultrasound on women seeking abortions four hours before the procedure. When the law was struck down, Tillis said that the ultrasound provision was "the most critical part of the law" and that the decision should be appealed. In 2012, he voted to defund Planned Parenthood in North Carolina.

In 2013, Tillis supported a motorcycle safety bill that had been surreptitiously amended to include restrictions on abortion.

In 2014, a Tillis spokesman told The Washington Post that Tillis would support a personhood bill if it were brought to the Senate floor, but only if abortion would continue to be legal "in cases of rape, incest and when the life of the mother is in danger" and if women would continue to "have access to contraceptives."

=== Animal welfare ===
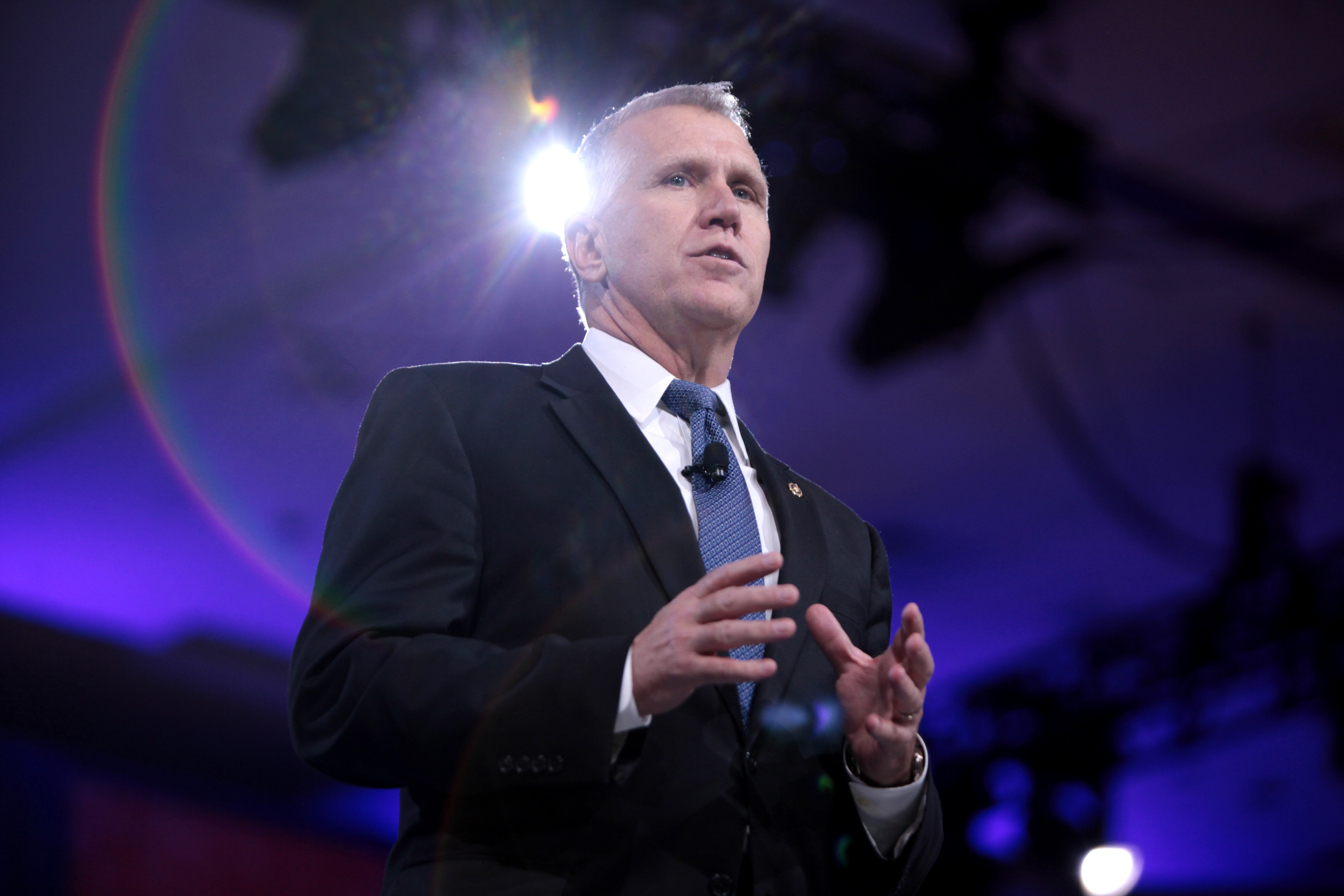
Tillis speaking at the 2016 Conservative Political Action Conference (CPAC) in National Harbor, Maryland

Tillis has been criticized by animal protection groups for cosponsoring the Ending Agricultural Trade Suppression (EATS) Act, which would limit the ability of states to regulate the sale of meat from animals raised on farms that do not meet animal welfare standards. The EATS Act is often discussed in relation to its potential to nullify state-level mandates, such as California's Proposition 12, which establishes specific space requirements for pigs, chickens, and veal calves. Critics of the bill allege that the bill jeopardizes farm animal welfare.

=== Crime and punishment ===
After Trump and Secretary of Defense Pete Hegseth announced in early October 2026 that the firing squad execution of 2009 Fort Hood shooting perpetrator Nidal Hasan, scheduled for December 3, 2026, would be livestreamed for public viewing, Tillis wrote on social media: "Hasan should face the death penalty, but making his execution public and streaming it? Beyond disgusting." He compared the streaming to "what oppressive dictatorships like Iran and Afghanistan do" and said public executions "should not be happening in America."

=== Economic policy ===
In a 2011 speech, Tillis said, "What we have to do is find a way to divide and conquer the people who are on assistance" by getting people who "had no choice" but to receive public assistance "to look down at these people who choose to get into a condition that makes them dependent on the government." After a video of the speech was publicized three years later while he was running for the US Senate, Tillis faced some blowback, with some likening the comment to Mitt Romney's "47%" remark. Tillis said he regretted the phrasing "divide and conquer" but defended the remark's substance.

In 2014, Tillis opposed increasing the federal minimum wage, and declined to comment on increasing North Carolina's minimum wage from $7.25 an hour after opposing the idea in 2010. He suggested the government should not set a minimum wage at all, calling it an "artificial threshold" that "drives up costs" and could reduce jobs.

In 2015, Tillis illustrated his attitude towards regulation by saying coffee shop companies should be able to "opt out" of hand-washing regulations "as long as they post a sign that says, 'We don't require our employees to wash their hands after leaving the restroom.' The market will take care of that."

In June 2025, Tillis opposed the One Big Beautiful Bill Act due to concerns about Medicaid cuts; as a result, Trump threatened to support primary challengers against him.

=== Environment ===
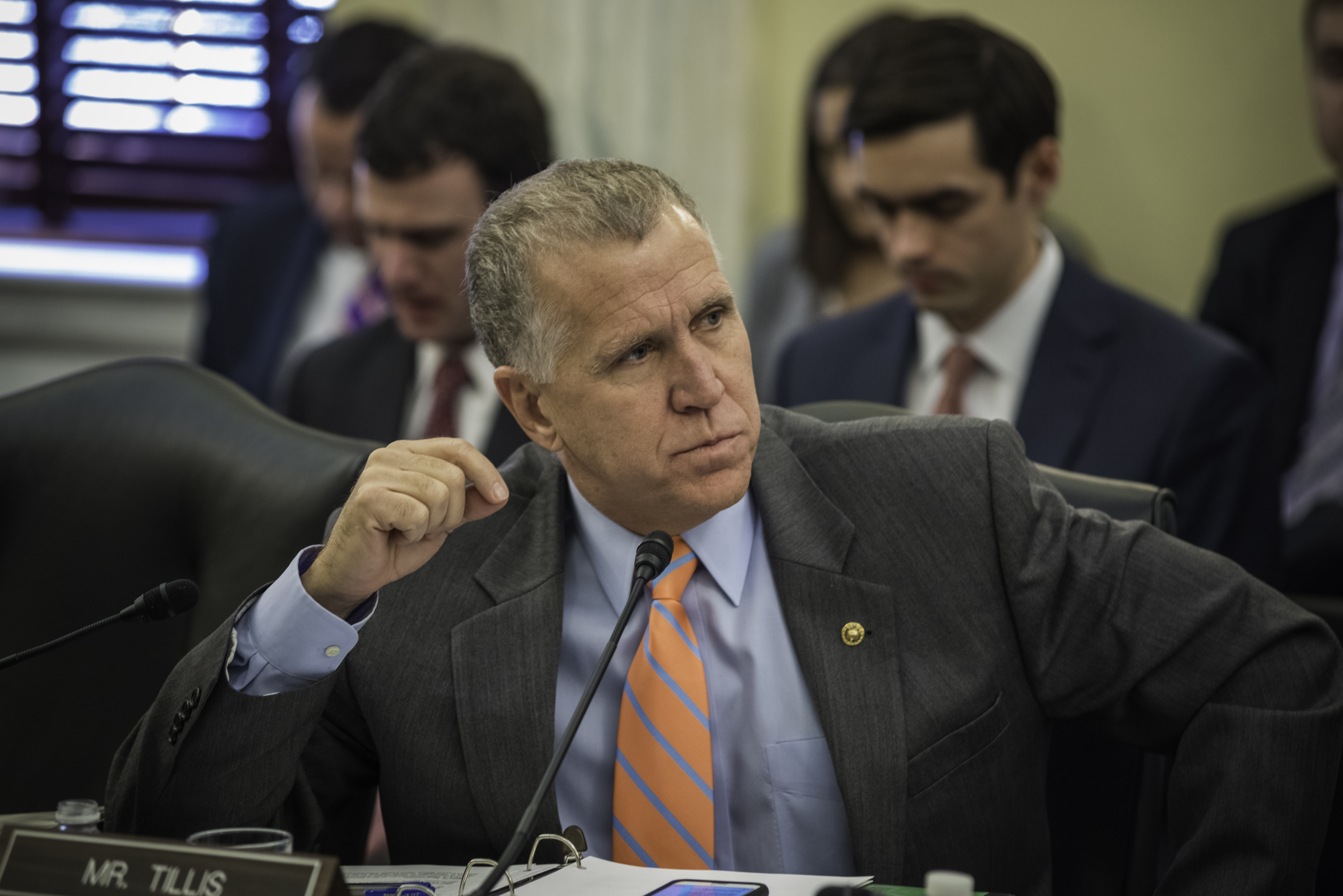
Tillis as a member of the Senate Committee on Agriculture, Nutrition and Forestry in 2015

In 2007, Tillis voted in favor of a measure to give North Carolina a renewable portfolio standard; in 2020, the state was second in solar energy production. During his first speech on the Senate floor, in 2015, Tillis called for opening up the United States' Atlantic coast for offshore drilling. He opposed the Clean Power Plan and supported Trump's rollback of it. In 2017, he called on Trump to withdraw the United States from the Paris Climate Accord.

In 2014, Tillis denied that climate change was occurring. In 2015, he voted against an amendment acknowledging its existence and the contribution of human activity. In 2018, Tillis said he believed climate change is happening and that humans may contribute to it, but remained unclear about whether he agrees with the scientific consensus on climate change that it is human-caused. In his 2020 Senate campaign, Inside Climate News described Tillis as trying to "remake himself as a moderate proponent of market-based climate solutions" despite a "record as a fossil fuel advocate closely aligned with Trump".

In November 2017, Tillis opposed Trump's nomination of Michael Dourson for an EPA role. In 2019, Tillis was one of 20 senators to sign a letter asking the EPA to regulate the amount of per- and polyfluoroalkyl substances in drinking water, after reports that they would not.

Tillis holds a 9% lifetime score from the League of Conservation Voters.

=== Gun policy ===
In the state House, Tillis supported an overhaul of gun laws allowing concealed weapons to be carried in restaurants and parks. He has an "A+" grade from the National Rifle Association Political Victory Fund (NRA-PVF), which spent $4.4 million during his 2014 Senate campaign, half in support of Tillis and half in opposition to Hagan. As of 2018, Tillis was the third-largest beneficiary of NRA funding in Congress.

After the 2016 Orlando nightclub shooting, Tillis voted for Republican bills to increase funding for the federal background check system and delay gun sales for 72 hours for individuals on the terrorist watchlist, but against Democratic bills to ban individuals on the terrorist watchlist from purchasing a gun and require background checks at gun shows and during online sales.

In 2022, Tillis was one of 15 Republican senators to have supported the Bipartisan Safer Communities Act, a bill that involved funding for state red flag provisions and crisis intervention orders, funding for school safety resources, stronger background checks for buyers under age 21, and penalties for straw purchases.

=== Foreign policy ===
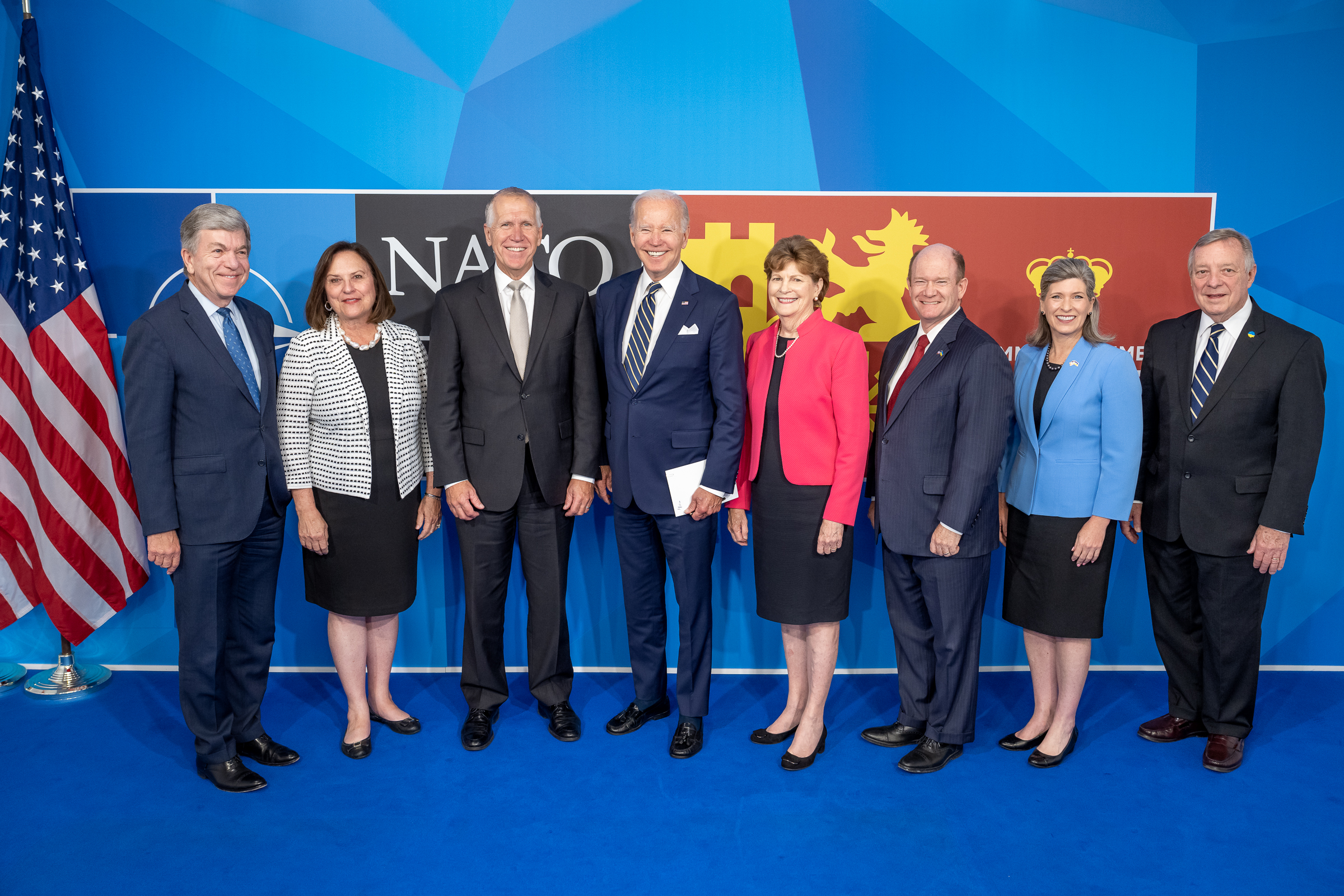
Tillis and other Senators join President Joe Biden at the 2022 NATO Summit in Madrid.

In 2017, Tillis was one of 21 senators to sign a letter condemning the genocide of the Rohingya Muslim minority in Myanmar. In 2020, he expressed support for the US military's assassination of Iranian major general Qasem Soleimani by drone strike at the Baghdad International Airport.

In February 2025, Tillis called Russian President Vladimir Putin a war criminal and the "greatest threat of democracy in my lifetime". He also called Putin a "liar, murderer, a man responsible for ordering the systematic torture, kidnapping and rape of innocent civilians", but did not directly criticize Trump's approach to the conflict.

=== Health care ===
Tillis opposes the Affordable Care Act (also known as Obamacare) and has repeatedly voted to repeal it. In the state House of Representatives, he led the Republican effort to block the expansion of Medicaid in North Carolina. As the legislation prevents a governor from expanding the program, North Carolina remains one of only 12 states not to have done so as of September 2020. Tillis has said that health care is "not a government responsibility" and that he will "do everything in his power to overturn Obamacare."

In 2018, amid attempts to repeal the ACA, Tillis introduced legislation to compensate for the ACA's requirement that insurers cover people with preexisting conditions. The bill was criticized for containing loopholes that exempted insurers from covering issues related to preexisting conditions and for failing to match the ACA's protections against discrimination. Tillis subsequently backtracked and said he could make improvements to the bill, and that it was merely intended to start a discussion.

=== Immigration ===
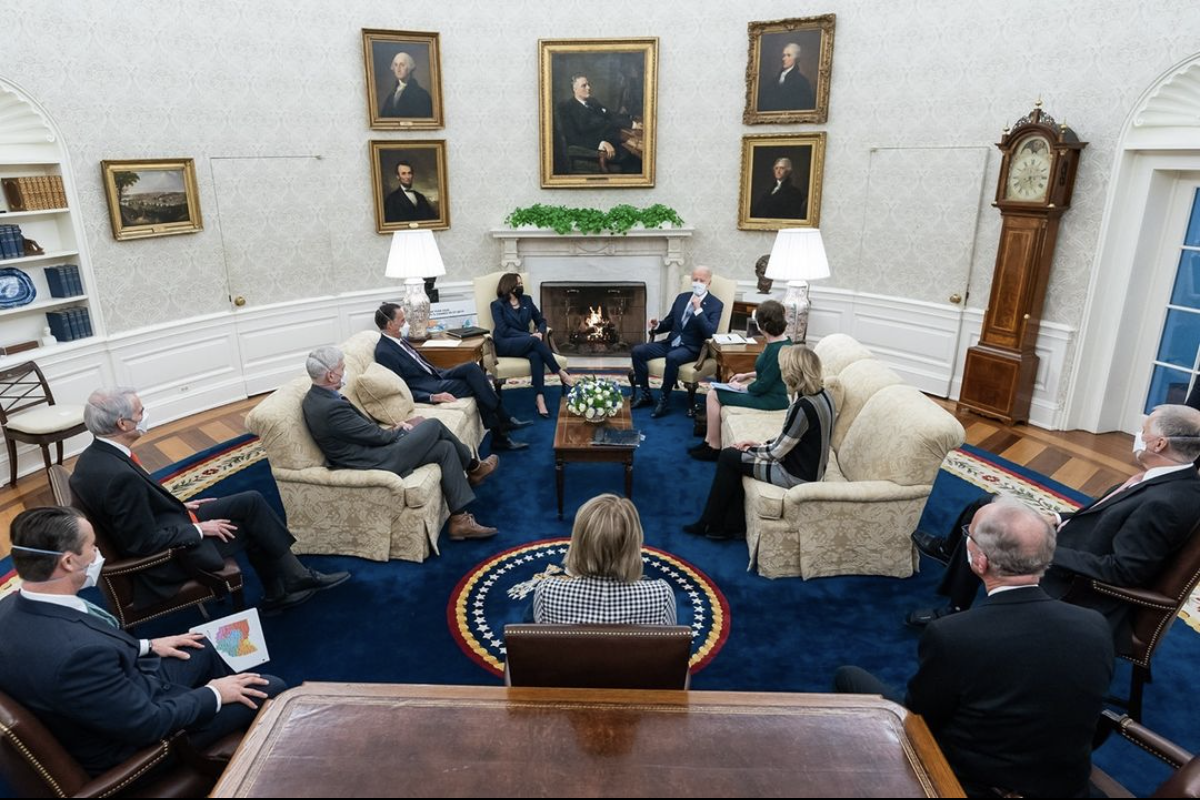
Tillis and other Republican Senators meet with President Joe Biden in 2021.

In 2017, amid Trump's moves to cancel DACA, Tillis proposed legislation to allow some undocumented youth brought to the U.S. as children to apply for renewable five-year residency, and eventually citizenship, as a more conservative alternative to the bipartisan DREAM Act. High school graduates under 31 would be eligible on conditions including regular employment, military service, or engagement in higher education. Unlike the DREAM Act, it would be possible to apply for citizenship only after 15 years, and the bill would prevent those who had become citizens from petitioning to grant residency to immediate family members, as well as require temporary visa recipients to waive their right to a hearing in case of a term violation.

In February 2019, Tillis wrote an op-ed in The Washington Post opposing Trump's national emergency declaration concerning the southern border, which diverted funding from the Department of Defense to build a border wall between the United States and Mexico. He wrote, "I cannot justify providing the executive with more ways to bypass Congress." Tillis faced pressure from Trump and conservatives to support the emergency declaration, and some conservatives proposed a primary challenge against Tillis in 2020. A week after making a statement reiterating his opposition, Tillis reversed his position and voted for Trump's declaration.

=== Internet, technology and copyright ===
Tillis opposes net neutrality. In 2017, he co-sponsored the Restoring Internet Freedom Act, a bill to nullify the Federal Communications Commission’s Open Internet Order. In March 2017, Tillis voted for the Broadband Consumer Privacy Proposal that removed the FCC's internet privacy rules and allowed internet service providers to sell customers' browsing history without their permission.

In May 2020, Tillis voted against an amendment to the Foreign Intelligence Surveillance Act to bar warrantless surveillance of web browser history. In April 2020, Tillis, who chairs the Senate Judiciary Committee's intellectual property panel, wrote that he was concerned that the Internet Archive's "National Emergency Library" initiative, which temporarily expanded access to its 1.4 million-book collection during the COVID-19 shutdown, violated copyright law. He argued that the Internet Archive was deciding to "re-write copyright law at the expense of authors, artists, and creators"; the Internet Archive argued that it was a licensed library in the state of California and that the Copyright Act of 1976 "provides flexibility to libraries and others to adjust to changing circumstances."

Tillis inserted an amendment to the Consolidated Appropriations Act of 2021 to make the unauthorized commercial streaming of copyrighted material a felony. Under this amendment, people and service providers would face up to three years in prison for unlawfully transmitting copyrighted material.

Tillis was the only Senator to vote against eliminating the 10-year artificial intelligence state-level regulation moratorium from the One Big Beautiful Bill Act.

=== LGBT issues ===
In 2012, Tillis, then speaker of the North Carolina House of Representatives, played a leading role in pushing for North Carolina Amendment 1, a state constitutional amendment that banned same-sex marriage and civil unions. In 2014, he appealed a ruling that it was unconstitutional.

In 2015, while in the Senate, Tillis voted for an amendment to a non-binding resolution that would allow same-sex married couples living in states that do not recognize same-sex marriage to have access to government resources.

In July 2022, Tillis said that he would "probably" support a bipartisan bill to codify same-sex marriage in the U.S. Tillis later expressed support for a same-sex marriage bill. In November 2022, Tillis called the Senate's same-sex marriage bill "a good compromise... based on mutual respect for our fellow Americans". On November 29, 2022, Tillis voted for the Respect for Marriage Act, which passed the Senate and was enacted. The law repealed the Defense of Marriage Act (DOMA) and codified rights to same-sex and interracial marriage into federal law.

=== Presidential appointments ===
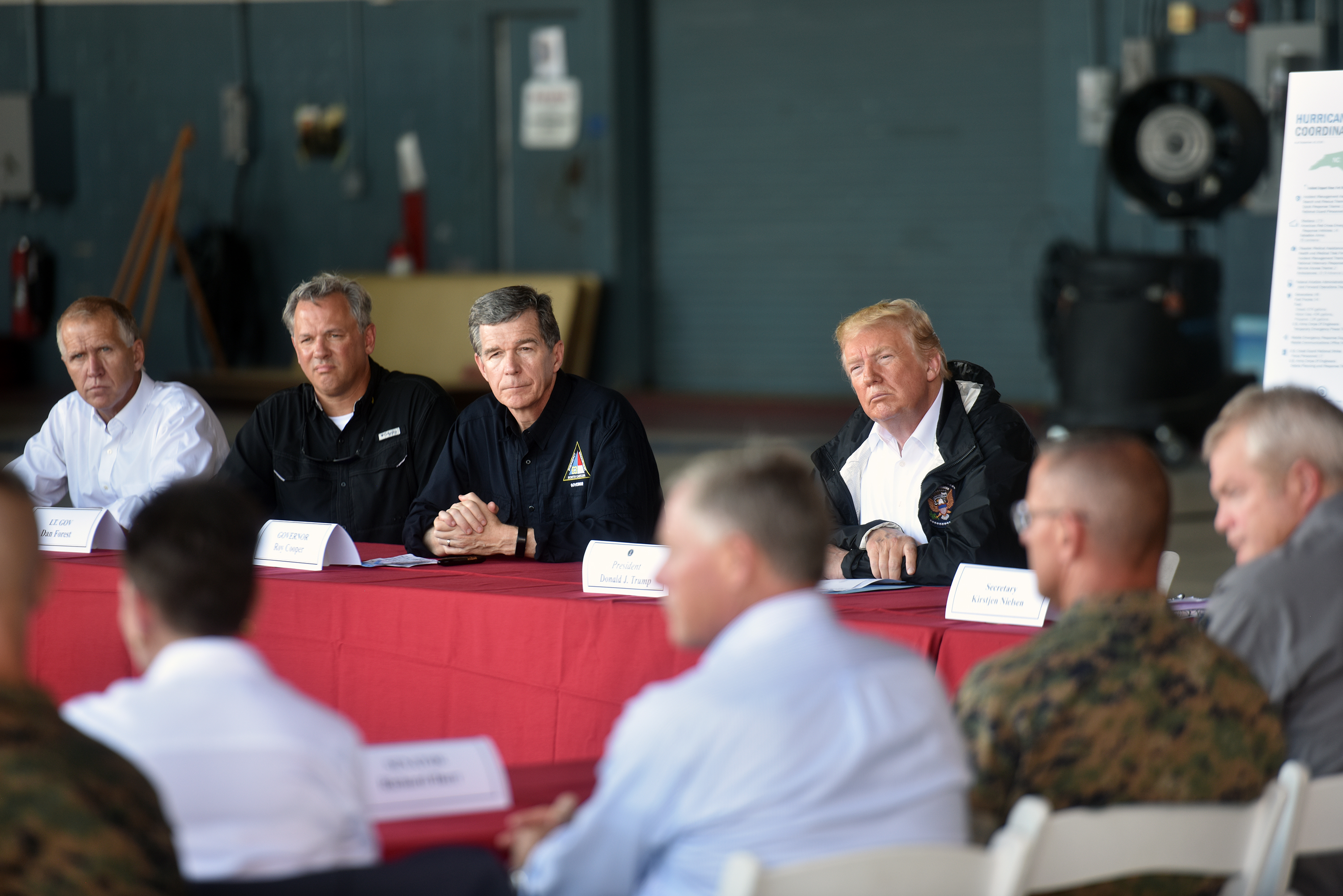
Tillis (far left) with North Carolina Governor Roy Cooper and President Donald Trump in 2018, after Hurricane Florence

In 2025, Tillis allegedly told Secretary of Defense nominee Pete Hegseth's ex-sister-in-law that if she signed a sworn statement testifying that she believed Hegseth has an alcohol-abuse problem and abused his second wife, it would "carry weight" and might cause Tillis and two other senators to vote against Hegseth's confirmation. She provided the sworn statement, but Tillis voted to confirm Hegseth. Tillis said the sworn statement did carry weight, and so he conveyed his concerns to the White House and conducted extensive research, but after he could not find firsthand corroboration of the claims, his vote followed "where the facts ultimately led". He later called his vote to confirm Hegseth the "biggest regret of my career". According to reporting by The New York Times based on anonymous sources, Tillis changed his vote to yes when Trump threatened to support a primary challenge against him. A Tillis spokesman disputed that report.

Tillis subsequently voted to confirm Tulsi Gabbard as director of national intelligence and Robert F. Kennedy Jr. as secretary of health and human services.

In May 2025, Tillis announced that he would oppose the confirmation of Ed Martin, Trump's nominee for United States Attorney for the District of Columbia, due to Martin's defense of rioters who breached the Capitol during the January 6 United States Capitol attack. Tillis said, "We have to be very, very clear that what happened on January 6th was wrong." Tillis' opposition was fatal to Martin's confirmation prospects, and Trump withdrew the nomination.

=== Veterans ===
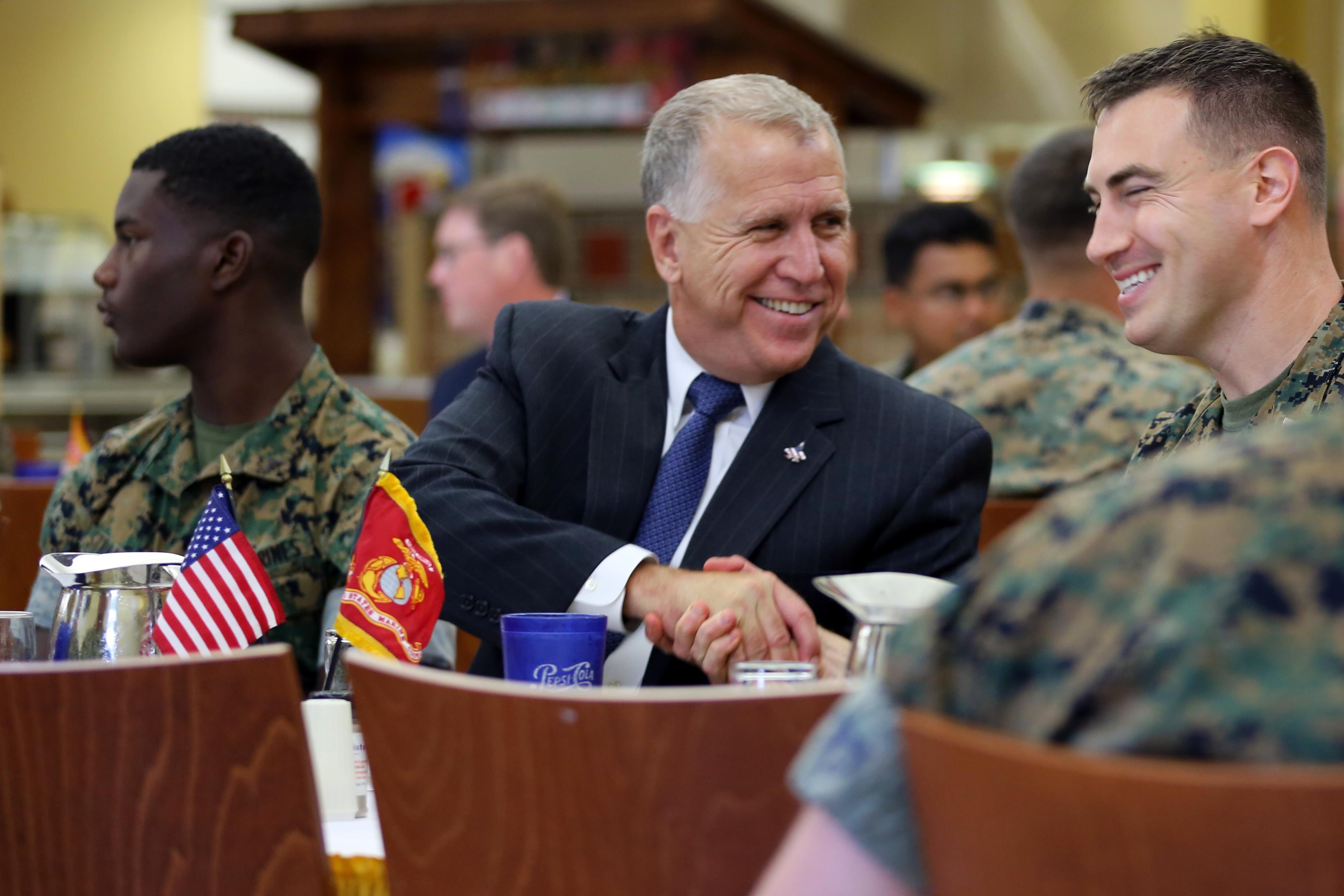
Tillis meeting with Marines at Cherry Point Marine Corps Air Station June 2016

In 2022, Tillis was among the 11 senators who voted against the Honoring our PACT Act of 2022, a bill that funded research and benefits for up to 3.5 million veterans exposed to toxic substances during their service, saying he doubted the ability of the Department of Veterans Affairs to implement the legislation effectively.

=== Whistleblowing ===
Since 2015, Tillis has been a member of the Senate Whistleblower Protection Caucus. The caucus was launched by a bipartisan group of senators in 2015 to raise awareness of the need for adequate protections against retaliation for private-sector and government employees who call attention to wrongdoing.

=== 2021 United States Capitol attack ===
On May 28, 2021, Tillis voted against creating an independent commission to investigate the 2021 United States Capitol attack. In August 2021, he said, "many involved needed to be held accountable and go to prison."

== Personal life ==
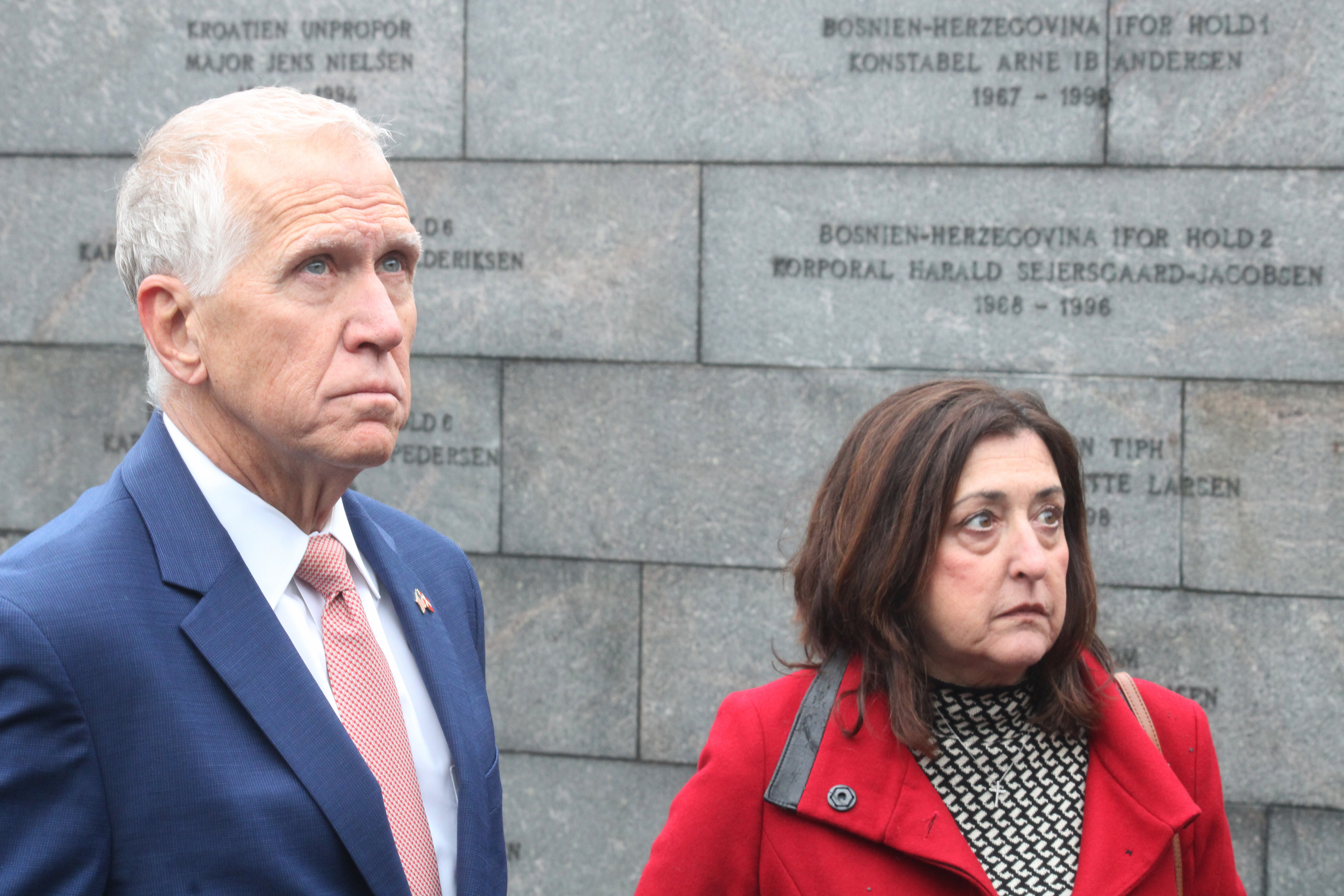
Tillis with his wife Susan at Kastellet in Copenhagen, Denmark in support of the country during the Greenland crisis, January 2026

Tillis and his wife, Susan, live in Huntersville, North Carolina, and have two children. Tillis previously twice married and twice divorced his high school sweetheart. He used to live in Cornelius, North Carolina, where he was elected to the town council. His brother, Rick, was a state representative in Tennessee.

Tillis is Catholic.

On March 29, 2021, Tillis announced he had prostate cancer and would be undergoing surgery and treatment. Tillis said he had no symptoms and the cancer was discovered during a routine annual physical. He encouraged all men to have regular prostate health screenings.

== Book ==
- Tillis, Thom (2026). How to Lose Friends and Antagonize Presidents: The Trouble with Sycophants, Courage Outsourcing, and Partisan Groupthink. Broadside Books. ISBN 978-0063580695.

== Electoral history ==
Political offices
Preceded by Joe Hackney	Speaker of the North Carolina House of Representatives; 2011–2015	Succeeded by Tim Moore
Party political offices
Preceded by Elizabeth Dole	Republican nominee for U.S. Senator from North Carolina (Class 2); 2014, 2020	Succeeded by Michael Whatley
U.S. Senate
Preceded by Kay Hagan	U.S. Senator (Class 2) from North Carolina; 2015–present Served alongside: Richard Burr, Ted Budd	Incumbent
U.S. order of precedence (ceremonial)
Preceded by Cory Booker as United States Senator from New Jersey	Order of precedence of the United States as United States Senator from North Carolina	Succeeded by Tom Cotton as United States Senator from Arkansas
Preceded by Mike Rounds	United States senators by seniority 53rd	Succeeded by Joni Ernst
