= Sam Whitson =

American politician

Member of the Tennessee House of Representatives from the 65th district
- In office January 2017 – January 2025
- Preceded by: Jeremy Durham
- Succeeded by: Lee Reeves

Personal details
- Born: April 11, 1954 (age 72) Tennessee, U.S.
- Party: Republican
- Spouse: Pam Whitson
- Children: 2
- Education: Middle Tennessee State University (BA); University of Oklahoma (MS)
- Awards: Bronze Star; Legion of Merit

Sam Whitson (born April 11, 1954) is an American politician. He is a retired United States Army colonel. He served as a Republican member of the Tennessee House of Representatives, where he represented the 65th District (Williamson County) until 2025.

== Early life ==
Sam Whitson was born on April 11, 1954, in Middle Tennessee.

Whitson graduated from the Glencliff High School in Nashville, Tennessee, in 1972. He graduated with a bachelor of science degree from Middle Tennessee State University, where he joined the Reserve Officers' Training Corps (ROTC) program in 1976. He subsequently earned a master in public administration from the University of Oklahoma.

== Career ==
Whitson served in the United States Army from 1976 to 2002. He was the chief of staff of the ROTC Cadet Command for the Eastern region in 2002, when he retired as a colonel. He was awarded the Legion of Merit and the Bronze Star Medal.

Whitson is the chairman of the Franklin Battlefield Commission and the Carter House State Historic Site.

Whiston defeated Jeremy Durham in the Republican primary for the Tennessee House of Representatives in August 2016. In December 2016, he defeated Democratic candidate Holly McCall. As a result, he represented the 65th District (Williamson County). He did not seek reelection in 2024.

== Personal life ==
Whitson has a wife, Pam, and two children. They reside in Franklin, Tennessee. He is a Methodist.
