= John W. Rhodes =

American politician and businessman from North Carolina

John Rhodes

Member of the North Carolina House of Representatives from the 98th district
- In office January 1, 2003 – January 1, 2007
- Preceded by: Constituency established
- Succeeded by: Thom Tillis

Personal details
- Party: Republican
- Occupation: Real estate broker, Businessman

John W. Rhodes is an American politician and businessman who served as a member of the North Carolina House of Representatives from 2003 to 2007. A real estate broker from Huntersville, North Carolina, Rhodes represented the 98th district. He was defeated in the 2006 Republican primary by Thom Tillis.

== Career ==
Rhodes was the first member of the North Carolina House to call for the resignation of Speaker Jim Black, after Black was accused of ethics violations and malfeasance. Black later resigned from the House after winning re-election in 2006 and was convicted on state and federal charges in 2007.

Citizens of North Carolina signed a petition to have Rhodes run as a write-in candidate for the U.S. Senate in 2014.

Rhodes attempted to win back his seat in the North Carolina House of Representatives in 2026, aiming to unseat Democratic incumbent Beth Gardner Helfrich, but he was defeated.

== Electoral history ==
=== 2026 ===
North Carolina House of Representatives 98th district Democratic general election, 2026
Party	Candidate	Votes	%
Democratic	Beth Gardner Helfrich	23,498	60.08%
Republican	John W. Rhodes	15,612	39.92%
Total votes		39,110	100%

=== 2006 ===
North Carolina House of Representatives 98th district Republican primary election, 2006
Party	Candidate	Votes	%
Republican	Thom Tillis	1,805	62.98%
Republican	John Rhodes (incumbent)	1,061	37.02%
Total votes		2,866	100%

=== 2004 ===
North Carolina House of Representatives 98th district general election, 2004
Party	Candidate	Votes	%
Republican	John Rhodes (incumbent)	27,830	100%
Total votes		27,830	100%
Republican hold			

=== 2002 ===
North Carolina House of Representatives 98th district general election, 2002
Party	Candidate	Votes	%
Republican	John Rhodes	13,661	57.92%
Democratic	David H. Dunn	9,927	42.08%
Total votes		23,588	100%
Republican win (new seat)			

North Carolina House of Representatives
Preceded by Thomas Wright	Member of the North Carolina House of Representatives from the 98th district 2003–2007	Succeeded by Thom Tillis
