= Jeremy Durham =

American politician (born 1983)

Jeremy Ryan Durham

Member of the Tennessee House of Representatives from the 65th district
- In office January 8, 2013 – September 13, 2016
- Preceded by: Eddie Bass
- Succeeded by: Sam Whitson

Personal details
- Born: December 11, 1983 (age 42) Jackson, Tennessee, U.S.
- Party: Republican
- Spouse: Jessica Durham
- Education: University of Tennessee (BA); University of Memphis Law School (JD)
- Occupation: Lawyer, politician

Jeremy Ryan Durham (December 11, 1983) is an American former politician and attorney. From January 2013 to September 2016 he served as the Republican member of the Tennessee House of Representatives for the 65th District, encompassing parts of Williamson County, Tennessee.

On July 13, 2016 a special committee of the Tennessee House of Representatives released a report that found Durham had inappropriate "sexual interactions" with 22 women. On September 13, 2016, Durham was expelled from the Tennessee House of Representatives on a 70–2 vote.

== Early years ==
Jeremy Durham was born in Jackson, Tennessee and grew up in Adamsville. He graduated from the University of Tennessee in Knoxville in 2006 and earned a J.D. from the University of Memphis Law School in 2008. From 2009 to 2011 he served as chairman of the Tennessee Young Republican Federation and founded the Tennessee Young Republicans PAC, which raised nearly $25,000 for Republican candidates in Tennessee. He was a partner in the law firm Hawkins, Durham & Associates from 2010 to 2012.

== Tennessee legislature ==
=== Committee assignments ===
Durham was a member of the Tennessee House Insurance and Banking Committee, the House Local Government Committee, and the House Local Government Subcommittee. In December 2014, during the 109th General Assembly, he was elected House Majority Whip.

=== Legislation ===
As of May 2016 Durham was the primary sponsor of 171 bills.

=== Awards ===
Durham was named "Freshman of the Year, Republican" in 2014 by Tom Humphrey, the Nashville Bureau Chief and primary political correspondent for the Knoxville News Sentinel. In January 2013 he was one of the first recipients of the American Conservative Union's Tennessee House "ACU Conservative" award. As part of the Williamson County legislative delegation, he was awarded the 2015 ACU Award For Conservative Excellence, its highest award.

=== Controversies ===
Durham wrote to a federal judge in 2014 seeking a more lenient sentence for a Bedford County Baptist youth pastor who had been convicted on a federal charge of possessing "'violent' and 'sadistic'" child pornography and state charges of statutory rape. Tennessee Lieutenant Governor Ron Ramsey called the move "poor judgment."

==== Sexual harassment and expulsion ====
In January 2016, Durham was accused of sexually harassing three women (by text message) who worked at the legislature. When speaking to the media about the allegations, Lieutenant Governor and Speaker of the Senate Ron Ramsey said, "Obviously, we don't want the press lynching anybody. But the press didn't force anyone to send text messages after midnight asking for pictures." Durham resigned as House Majority Whip on January 24, 2016. On January 27 House Speaker Beth Harwell said she agreed with Ramsey that Durham should be expelled from the state legislature. Durham has said that he did not remember sending the texts. He told the Republican Caucus that he would seek "help", then clarified to the Williamson Herald, a newspaper in his district, that he meant he would speak to his doctor about finding ways to manage stress.

On April 1, 2016, Durham filed papers and announced his intention to run for re-election. On April 7, 2016, Speaker Harwell directed that Durham's office be moved out of the Tennessee State House into a nearby building and restrictions were placed on his access to state facilities. The Tennessee Attorney General had recommended that some action be taken as his preliminary investigation indicated Durham might pose a risk to "unsuspecting women." On July 13, 2016, the Attorney General's special investigation found that Durham had "made inappropriate comments of a sexual nature or engaged in inappropriate physical contact" with at least 22 women over whom he "occupied a superior position of power", including a 2014 incident in which he "...served alcohol to a female college student who was under 21 years old..., followed by sexual intercourse." The Attorney General also referred Durham to the Tennessee Registry of Election Finance for potential violations of campaign finance laws. On July 14, 2016 Durham announced he was suspending his re-election campaign.

Since the AG report, House Democrats had called for Durham's expulsion. Republicans joined in after learning he could still draw his pension even though he would not be in office for the next legislative session. An expulsion would prevent his pension from vesting. Governor Bill Haslam called an extraordinary session of the General Assembly to convene in September 2016. This session was to address DUI laws that would cost the state $60 million in federal funding if the state was not in compliance by October 1. The expulsion of Durham was not included in the proclamation as Haslam said it was not the role of the administration to decide. Speaker Beth Harwell commented that she would push for an expulsion motion during the session. Durham's attorney raised concerns over the constitutionality of an expulsion motion in an extraordinary session as it was outside the scope of the Governor's call. However, the Speaker and the House Clerk's office stated that an expulsion motion is procedural instead of legislative and that there is also precedent for the House passing Resolutions during an extraordinary session. Republican Caucus Chairman Glen Casada pointed to the 1866 extraordinary session where the General Assembly expelled six members following the ratification of the Fourteenth Amendment. The expelled Members in 1866 were intentionally absent from the session in an attempt to stop the ratification through the lack of quorum.

On the second day of the extraordinary session, Representative Susan Lynn made the motion to expel Durham during the unfinished business portion of the agenda. Durham spoke from the well defending himself and criticized the lack of due process during the procedures. He also answered some questions from other Representatives during the debate before eventually leaving the Capitol abruptly. A motion was made to force Durham to return to the Chambers to continue answering questions; however that motion failed. Durham was then expelled from the Tennessee House of Representatives on September 13, 2016 with a vote of 70-2-16. Most of the sixteen abstaining voters sided with Durham's criticism over the lack of due process.

== Personal life ==
Durham works as a small business attorney in Franklin, Tennessee. He is married to Dr. Jessica Durham, an optometrist. They reside in Franklin, Tennessee. Durham has attention deficit hyperactivity disorder and has taken Adderall intermittently since 2009 to treat it.

=== Legal issues ===
On the evening of October 22, 2022, Durham was charged with driving under the influence, along with resisting arrest and possession of marijuana, after he crashed at an intersection in Downtown Nashville.

In May 2025, Jeremy Durham was found guilty of driving under the influence (DUI), Felony Reckless Endangerment, resisting arrest, and unlawful possession of drug paraphernalia, stemming from a 2023 arrest in Nashville, Tennessee. The charges were related to an incident in which Durham struck a parked vehicle and resisted the responding officer. The case drew public attention due to Durham's prior expulsion from the Tennessee House of Representatives in 2016.
