= Eddie Bass =

American politician (born 1969)

Member of the Tennessee House of Representatives from the 65th district
- In office January 9, 2007 – January 8, 2013
- Preceded by: Joe Fowlkes
- Succeeded by: Jeremy Durham (redistricted)

Personal details
- Born: November 3, 1967 (age 58) Giles County, Tennessee, U.S.
- Party: Democratic
- Children: 2

Eddie Bass (born 1957) is an American politician and law enforcement officer. From 2007 to 2013, he served as a Democratic member of the Tennessee House of Representatives for the 65th district.

== Early life ==
Eddie Bass was born on November 3, 1957, in Giles County, Tennessee. He graduated from Giles County High School in Pulaski, Tennessee, the Tennessee Law Enforcement Academy and the Tennessee Law Enforcement Training Academy Criminal Investigation School.

== Career ==
Bass served as a sheriff for Giles County.

From 2006 to 2012, Bass served as a state representative for the sixty-fifth district of Tennessee. He was a member of the House Agriculture Committee, the House Judiciary Committee, and the House General Sub-committee of Judiciary. He proposed a bill drafted by the National Rifle Association of America that would have forced businesses to allow employees to store firearms in vehicles parked on company lots. He considered running for reelection as a Republican in 2012, but renounced after he had angered GOP bosses by proposing the gun bill as a Democrat before them.

== Personal life ==
Bass is a member of the Churches of Christ.
