= Renee Ellmers =

American nurse and politician (born 1964)

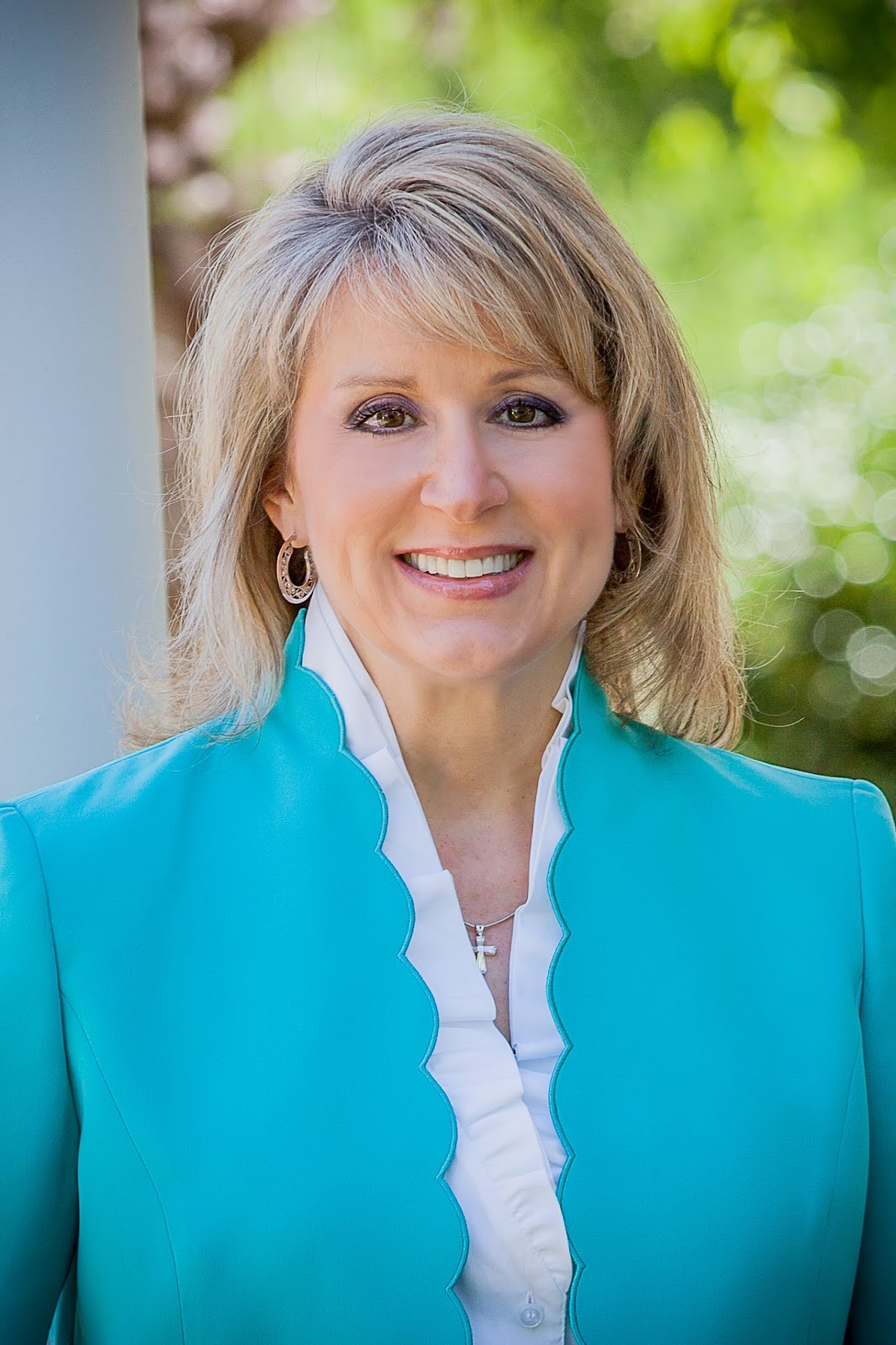
- Official portrait, 2014

Member of the U.S. House of Representatives from North Carolina's 2nd district
- In office January 3, 2011 – January 3, 2017
- Preceded by: Bob Etheridge
- Succeeded by: George Holding

Personal details
- Born: Renee Louise Jacisin; February 9, 1964 (age 62) Ironwood, Michigan, U.S.
- Party: Republican
- Spouse: Brent Ellmers
- Children: 1
- Education: Oakland University (BS)
- Website: Official website

Renee Louise Ellmers (née Jacisin; born February 9, 1964) is an American registered nurse and politician who was the U.S. representative for North Carolina's 2nd congressional district from 2011 to 2017. She is a member of the Republican Party. Ellmers defeated seven-term Democratic incumbent Bob Etheridge in 2010 by 1,489 votes, confirmed after a recount. In the 2016 Republican primary, Ellmers was defeated by fellow U.S. Representative George Holding.

In 2020, Ellmers sought election as Lieutenant Governor of North Carolina. She placed fifth in the Republican primary election, with businessman Mark Robinson securing the nomination and eventually winning the general election. She ran unsuccessfully in the 2022 election in North Carolina's 13th congressional district, finishing fifth in the primary field.

== Early life, education, and nursing career ==
Ellmers was born Renee Louise Jacisin in Ironwood, Michigan, the daughter of Caroline Pauline (née Marshalek) and LeRoy Francis Jacisin. Her father was of Czech and French-Canadian descent and her mother was of Croatian and Polish ancestry. She moved to Madison Heights as a child, when her father got a job in the automobile industry. She graduated from Madison High School. Ellmers paid her way through Oakland University by working various jobs, training as a medical assistant. In 1990, she graduated with a Bachelor of Science in Nursing. Ellmers worked as a nurse in Beaumont Hospital's surgical intensive care unit. In North Carolina, she was clinical director of the Trinity Wound Care Center in Dunn.

== U.S. House of Representatives ==
=== Elections ===
==== 2010 ====
Ellmers became involved in politics after the passage of the Patient Protection and Affordable Care Act, which she opposed. She became involved in local Republican politics and joined Americans for Prosperity, a free-market political advocacy group. She sought the Republican Party nomination for Congress in North Carolina's 2nd congressional district, which was then held by seven-term incumbent Bob Etheridge. She faced car dealer Todd Gailas and retired businessman Frank Deatrich in the May 4, 2010 Republican primary. She raised and spent more money than her opponents. She won the Republican primary with 55% of the vote, winning every county in the district except Franklin.

In June, a physical altercation between U.S. Congressman Bob Etheridge and two young men claiming to be students working on a project was posted to the internet. The previously obscure Ellmers was highlighted by conservative blogs such as RedState and the National Review's The Corner. Donations increased markedly, and a SurveyUSA poll showed Ellmers ahead by one percent. Ellmers received an endorsement from former Governor of Alaska Sarah Palin on August 18 through Facebook, citing Ellmers' experience in the health care industry. Palin endorsed Ellmers along with three other women, on the 90th anniversary of women's suffrage in the United States.

On election day, November 2, 2010, Ellmers was declared the winner by the media and a recount conducted on November 17 and 18 confirmed that she defeated Bob Etheridge during the general election by a margin of 0.8% or 1,483 votes.

==== 2012 ====
The Republicans won control of the General Assembly in the 2010 election as well, and used the redistricting process to make the 2nd friendlier for Ellmers. They pushed the district well to the west to take in some heavily Republican territory between Raleigh and Greensboro. The two sections were connected by a narrow tendril sweeping from Fayetteville through Ellmers' home in Dunn to Raleigh. While Barack Obama won the old 2nd with 52 percent of the vote—one of the few majority-white districts in the south that went for Obama—John McCain would have carried the new 2nd with 57 percent of the vote.

Three Republicans decided to challenge her in the primary, but all of them were first-time candidates. She won the May 8 primary with 56% of the vote. In the November general election, Ellmers defeated Democratic nominee Steve Wilkins, a retired US Army officer and Moore County businessman, 56%–41%.

==== 2014 ====
Ellmers considered running for the U.S. Senate in 2014, but instead ran for re-election. In May 2014 primary she faced conservative Internet talk show host Frank Roche, who campaigned mainly against her support of immigration reform. Ellmers easily won the nomination, capturing 58% of the vote to Roche's 41%. American Idol runner-up Clay Aiken won the Democratic nomination after a close primary. Ellmers secured the seat again with a margin of 36,649 votes from Second District voters.

==== 2016 ====
A court-ordered redistricting made the 2nd significantly more compact. It lost much of its territory near Greensboro, and now took in a large chunk of the area represented by the former 13th district, forcing Ellmers into a primary challenge with George Holding, whose former district number was moved to the Triad area of North Carolina. Ellmers stated that Holding wasn't qualified to run in the district since he lived just outside its borders (though members of the House are only required to live in the state they represent). However, the new 2nd was geographically more Holding's district than Ellmers'. Ellmers had to contend with a high level of campaign spending by outside groups aligning themselves with the Tea Party movement, including Americans for Prosperity, which spent in the "low six figures" to defeat her. Conservative opposition to Ellmers arose from her push to prevent a vote on a 2015 abortion bill, from her votes on spending and budget bills, and from her vote in favor of the continuation of the Export-Import Bank. In the June 7th primary, she lost her primary campaign to Holding by an almost 30-point margin, coming in second by just 0.6% over third-place Greg Brannon.

=== Tenure ===
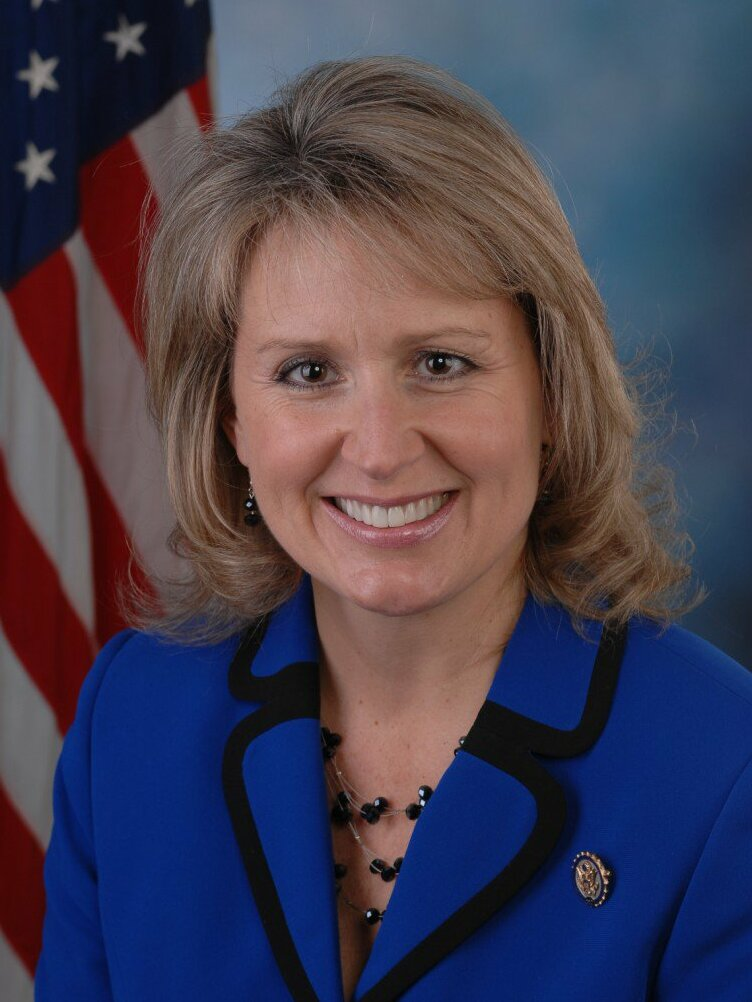
112th Congress official portrait

In September 2011, Ellmers told students at Campbell University that she opposed a state constitutional amendment banning same-sex marriage and civil unions because it was too broad. A spokesman said "Congresswoman Ellmers has always believed that marriage is a sacred institution and is defined as the union between one man and one woman...As a voter, she would vote against a piece of legislation that would add a ban on civil unions to the protection of marriage since they are two different issues and should be dealt with separately."

She supported the Budget Control Act of 2011 saying "It's not 100 percent of what many of our very conservative colleagues want, but it is about 70-75 percent. This is not about who's the most conservative. This is about common sense."

Ellmer served as the chairwoman of the Republican Women's Policy Committee.

In 2015, Ellmers—who identifies as pro-life—co-led a group of Republican women that advocated against holding a floor vote on the Pain-Capable Unborn Child Protection Act; the bill would ban abortions after 20 weeks' gestation. Ellmers reportedly "objected to a provision in the bill that would have required women seeking a rape or incest exemption to have reported those rapes to the authorities."

=== Committee assignments ===
- Committee on Energy and Commerce
  - Subcommittee on Health
  - Subcommittee on Oversight and Investigations
  - Subcommittee on Communications and Technology

=== Caucus memberships ===
- Congressional Constitution Caucus

== Post-congressional career ==
In May 2017, Ellmers began working for the United States Department of Health and Human Services as a regional director in Atlanta. She worked as a registered nurse during the COVID-19 pandemic in the United States.

=== 2020 Lieutenant Gubernatorial Campaign ===
In 2020, Ellmers sought election as Lieutenant Governor of North Carolina. She placed fifth in the Republican primary election, with businessman Mark Robinson securing the nomination and eventually winning the general election.

=== 2022 U.S. House Campaign ===
She ran unsuccessfully in the 2022 U.S. House election in North Carolina's 13th congressional district, finishing fifth in the primary field.

== Sponsored legislation ==
=== The White House Accountability Act ===
On March 26, 2015, Ellmers sponsored a bill called The White House Accountability Act (H.R.1693). She introduced the bill as her response to President Obama issuing an executive order to cease deportation of undocumented immigrants. The bill is aimed at funds Congress appropriated for White House salaries and expenses for fiscal year 2015. If passed, the bill would rescind any funds left that have not yet been spent.

=== Fairness for Farmers Act ===
On March 17, 2015, Ellmers sponsored the Fairness for Farmers Act of 2015. The bill would give an exemption to agricultural farming companies from the section of the Affordable Care Act that mandates health insurance coverage for employers that have more than 50 employees.

=== Vaccine Access, Certainty, and Innovation Act ===
On February 5, 2015, Ellmers introduced H.R. 786: Vaccine Access, Certainty, and Innovation Act of 2015. Democratic Congressman G.K. Butterfield cosponsored the bill. The trade association for biotechnology companies (the Biotechnology Industry Organization, "BIO") supported the bill. If passed into law, the bill would make the work conducted by the Advisory Committee on Immunization Practices (ACIP) more transparent and consistent toward the goal of developing recommendations for vaccines; create a formal process for the Centers for Disease Control to meet regularly with companies that make vaccines; and push Medicare to promptly pay for vaccines for senior citizens.

== Personal life ==
Ellmers met her husband, Brent Ellmers, a surgeon, while working at Beaumont Hospital. After the birth of their son, the family moved to Dunn, North Carolina, where Ellmers and her husband ran a practice.

In October 2015, House Majority Leader Kevin McCarthy was accused of having an affair with Ellmers. He had unexpectedly dropped out of the race for Speaker of the House shortly before the allegations surfaced. Both McCarthy and Ellmers have denied the allegations.

Ellmers, a Roman Catholic, has said, "As a mom, Christian and nurse, my beliefs have deepened through experience... I am pro-family."

== Electoral history ==
2010 North Carolina's 2nd congressional district election
Party	Candidate	Votes	%
Republican	Renee Ellmers	93,876	49.47
Democratic	Bob Etheridge (incumbent)	92,393	48.69
Libertarian	Tom Rose	3,505	1.85
Total votes		189,774	100.00
Republican gain from Democratic			

2012 North Carolina's 2nd congressional district election
Party	Candidate	Votes	%
Republican	Renee Ellmers (incumbent)	174,066	55.9
Democratic	Steve Wilkins	128,973	41.42
Libertarian	Brian Irving	8,358	2.68
Total votes		311,397	100.00
Republican hold			

2014 North Carolina's 2nd congressional district election
Party	Candidate	Votes	%
Republican	Renee Ellmers (incumbent)	122,128	58.83
Democratic	Clay Aiken	85,479	41.17
Total votes		207,607	100.00
Republican hold			

2016 Republican primary results, North Carolina 2nd congressional district
Party	Candidate	Votes	%
Republican	George Holding (incumbent)	17,084	53.4
Republican	Renee Ellmers (incumbent)	7,552	23.6
Republican	Greg Brannon	7,359	23.0
Total votes		31,995	100.0

2020 North Carolina Republican Primary lieutenant gubernatorial election
Party	Candidate	Votes	%
Republican	Mark Robinson	240,843	32.52%
Republican	Andy Wells	107,824	14.56%
Republican	Mark Johnson	89,200	12.04%
Republican	John L. Ritter	85,023	11.48%
Republican	Renee Ellmers	50,526	6.82%
Republican	Greg Gebhardt	50,474	6.81%
Republican	Deborah Cochran	48,234	6.51%
Republican	Scott Stone	48,193	6.51%
Republican	Buddy Bengel	20,395	2.75%
Total votes		740,712	100%

== See also ==
- Women in the United States House of Representatives

U.S. House of Representatives
Preceded by Bob Etheridge	Member of the U.S. House of Representatives from North Carolina's 2nd congressional district 2011–2017	Succeeded by George Holding
Party political offices
Preceded by Mary Bono	Chair of the Republican Women's Policy Committee; 2013–2017	Vacant Title next held by Katie Britt; Kat Cammack; 2025 as Chair of the Republican Women's Caucus
U.S. order of precedence (ceremonial)
Preceded by Heath Shuler as Former U.S. Representative	Order of precedence of the United States as Former U.S. Representative	Succeeded by Mark Meadows as Former U.S. Representative
