= 2016 United States House of Representatives elections in North Carolina =

- November 8, 2016

All 13 North Carolina seats to the United States House of Representatives
	Majority party	Minority party
Party	Republican	Democratic
Last election	10	3
Seats won	10	3
Seat change	Steady	Steady
Popular vote	2,447,326	2,142,661
Percentage	53.22%	46.60%
Swing	▼2.17%	▲2.65%

Republican
50–60%
60–70%
70–80%
Democratic
40–50%
50–60%
60–70%
70–80%

The 2016 United States House of Representatives elections in North Carolina were held on November 8, 2016, to elect the 13 U.S. representatives from the state of North Carolina, one from each of the state's 13 congressional districts. The elections coincided with the 2016 U.S. presidential election, as well as other elections to the House of Representatives, elections to the United States Senate and various state and local elections.

Primary elections were originally scheduled for March 15, but were moved to June 7, due to successful challenges to the 1st and 12th congressional districts in federal court and the drawing of new maps affecting almost all of the state's districts.

Long before the court had ruled, candidates had filed for the March 15 party primaries for each district under the old maps in December 2015, per the North Carolina State Board of Elections. After the court ruled and the North Carolina General Assembly passed new district maps, the State Board established a filing period for the new primary date for candidates of major parties, March 16–25. Candidates had to refile for the June 7 primary, if they still chose to run, in any district they chose. The results of the March 15 primary, which went ahead because ballots had already been printed and mailed to absentee voters by the time of the ruling, were not counted.

== 2016 North Carolina redistricting ==
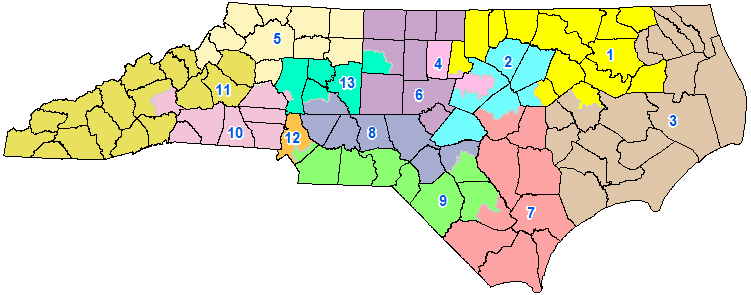
This image shows the 2016–2020 court-ordered NC Congressional districts.

The North Carolina Legislature's 2012 redistricting was found unconstitutional by the United States District Court for the Middle District of North Carolina and replaced on February 19, 2016.

District	Old PVI	New PVI	Incumbent
1st	D+19	D+15	G. K. Butterfield
2nd	R+10	R+8	Renee Ellmers
3rd	R+11	R+11	Walter B. Jones Jr.
4th	D+20	D+13	David Price
5th	R+11	R+9	Virginia Foxx
6th	R+11	R+10	Mark Walker
7th	R+12	R+9	David Rouzer
8th	R+12	R+8	Richard Hudson
9th	R+8	R+8	Robert Pittenger
10th	R+11	R+11	Patrick McHenry
11th	R+12	R+12	Mark Meadows
12th	D+26	D+16	Alma Adams
13th	R+8	R+5	George Holding

== Overview ==
=== Statewide ===
Party	Candidates	Votes		Seats		
Party	Candidates	No.	%	No.	+/–	%
Republican	13	2,447,326	53.22	9	Steady	76.92
Democratic	13	2,142,661	46.60	3	Steady	23.08
Libertarian	1	8,471	0.18	0	Steady	0.00
Total	4,598,458	100.0	100.0	13	Steady	100.0

Popular vote
Republican	53.22%
Democratic	46.60%
Libertarian	0.18%

House seats
Republican	76.92%
Democratic	23.08%
Libertarian	0.00%

=== By district ===
Results of the 2016 United States House of Representatives elections in North Carolina by district:

District	Republican		Democratic		Libertarian		Total		Result
District	Votes	%	Votes	%	Votes	%	Votes	%	Result
District 1	101,567	28.96%	240,661	68.62%	8,471	2.42%	350,699	100.00%	Democratic hold
District 2	221,485	56.71%	169,082	43.29%	0	0.00%	390,567	100.00%	Republican hold
District 3	217,531	67.20%	106,170	32.80%	0	0.00%	323,701	100.00%	Republican hold
District 4	130,161	31.78%	279,380	68.22%	0	0.00%	409,541	100.00%	Democratic hold
District 5	207,625	58.40%	147,887	41.60%	0	0.00%	355,512	100.00%	Republican hold
District 6	207,983	59.23%	143,167	40.77%	0	0.00%	351,150	100.00%	Republican hold
District 7	211,801	60.91%	135,905	39.09%	0	0.00%	347,706	100.00%	Republican hold
District 8	189,863	58.77%	133,182	41.23%	0	0.00%	323,045	100.00%	Republican hold
District 9	193,452	58.18%	139,041	41.82%	0	0.00%	332,493	100.00%	Republican hold
District 10	220,825	63.14%	128,919	36.86%	0	0.00%	349,744	100.00%	Republican hold
District 11	230,405	64.09%	129,103	35.91%	0	0.00%	359,508	100.00%	Republican hold
District 12	115,185	32.98%	234,115	67.02%	0	0.00%	349,300	100.00%	Democratic hold
District 13	199,443	56.10%	156,049	43.90%	0	0.00%	355,492	100.00%	Republican hold
Total	2,447,326	53.22%	2,142,661	46.60%	8,471	0.18%	4,598,458	100.00%	

== District 1 ==
2016 North Carolina's 1st congressional district election
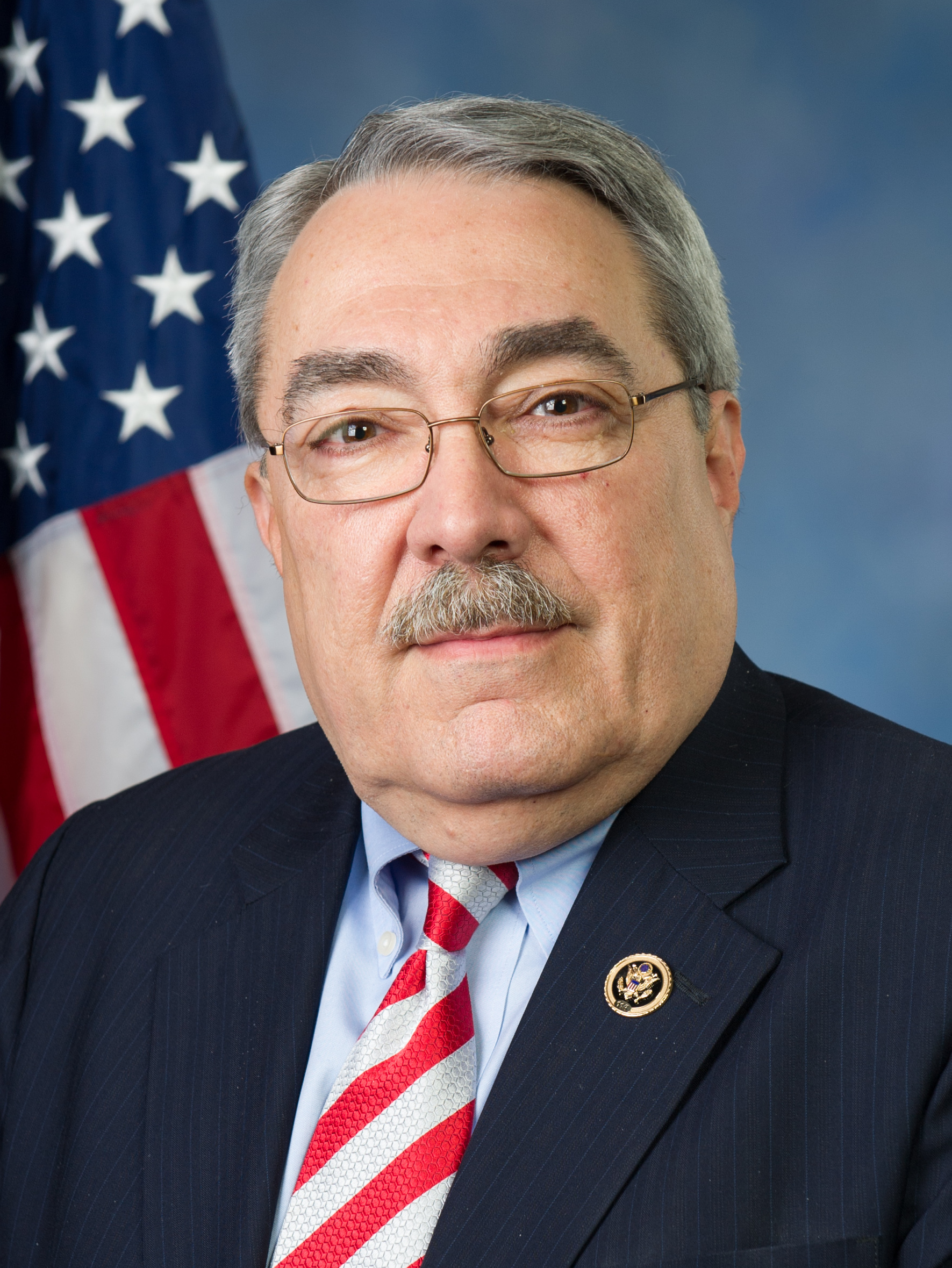

Nominee	G. K. Butterfield	H. Powell Dew Jr.
Party	Democratic	Republican
Popular vote	240,661	101,567
Percentage	68.6%	29.0%
- County results Butterfield: 40–50% 50–60% 60–70% 70–80%
U.S. Representative before election
G. K. Butterfield
Democratic
Elected U.S. Representative
G. K. Butterfield
Democratic

The 1st district is located in Northeastern North Carolina. The new map made the 1st district somewhat more compact. Incumbent Democrat G. K. Butterfield, who had represented the district since 2004, ran for re-election. He was re-elected with 73% of the vote in 2014. The district had a PVI of D+15.

=== Democratic primary ===
==== Candidates ====
===== Nominee =====
- G. K. Butterfield, incumbent U.S. Representative

=== Republican primary ===
==== Candidates ====
No candidates filed for the Republican primary for this seat under the old map, but Powell Dew Jr filed under the new map and was unopposed for his party's nomination.

===== Nominee =====
- H. Powell Dew Jr., member of the Stantonsburg Town Council

=== Libertarian primary ===
C. L. Cooke was running unopposed for the Libertarian nomination under the old map. J. J. Summerell was the only Libertarian candidate to file under the new map.

=== General election ===
==== Endorsements ====
G. K. Butterfield (D)

Labor unions

- AFL-CIO
- Communications Workers of America
- International Brotherhood of Boilermakers

==== Predictions ====
Source	Ranking	As of
The Cook Political Report	Safe D	November 7, 2016
Daily Kos Elections	Safe D	November 7, 2016
Rothenberg	Safe D	November 3, 2016
Sabato's Crystal Ball	Safe D	November 7, 2016
RCP	Safe D	October 31, 2016

==== Results ====
North Carolina's 1st congressional district, 2016
Party	Candidate	Votes	%
Democratic	G. K. Butterfield (incumbent)	240,661	68.6
Republican	H. Powell Dew Jr.	101,567	29.0
Libertarian	J. J. Summerell	8,471	2.4
Total votes		350,699	100.0
Democratic hold			

== District 2 ==
2016 North Carolina's 2nd congressional district election
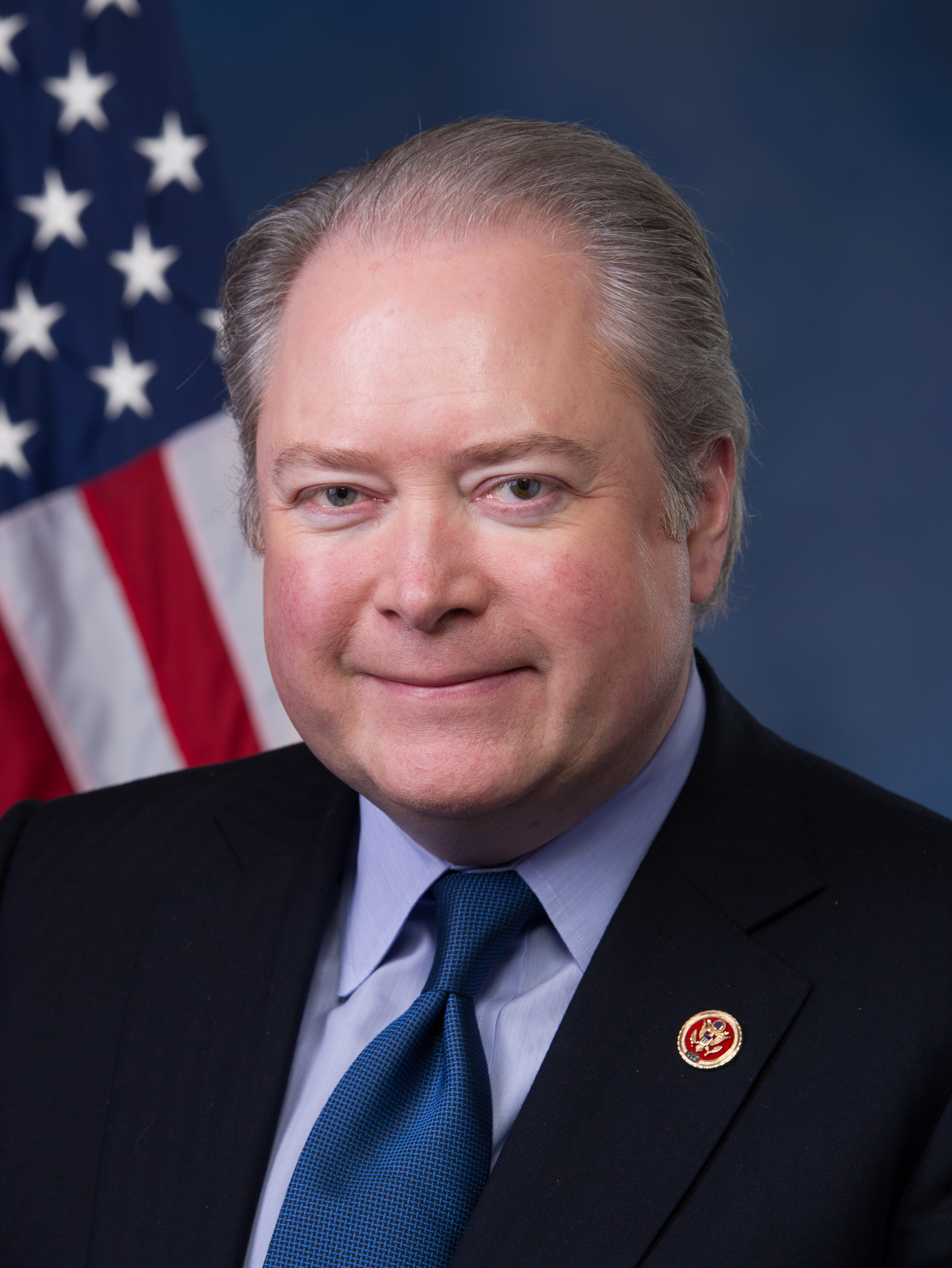

Nominee	George Holding	John McNeil
Party	Republican	Democratic
Popular vote	221,485	169,082
Percentage	56.7%	43.3%
- County results Holding: 50–60% 60–70%
U.S. Representative before election
Renee Ellmers
Republican
Elected U.S. Representative
George Holding
Republican

The 2nd district is located in central North Carolina. The new map moved the 2nd district to the east and the north. Incumbent Republican Renee Ellmers, who had represented the district since 2011, ran for re-election. She was re-elected with 59% of the vote in 2014. The district had a PVI of R+8.

=== Republican primary ===
==== Campaign ====
Ellmers had faced a primary challenge from radio host Frank Roche in 2014. Despite Roche's weak fundraising, she only won the primary 59% to 41%. Her role in a 20-week abortion ban bill being pulled intensified calls from the conservative wing to challenge her in 2016.

Jim Duncan, the former chair of the Chatham County Republican Party and co-founder of the grassroots organization The Coalition for American Principles, challenged Ellmers for the Republican nomination at first but dropped out after the district lines changed. 2014 candidate Frank Roche also ran again at first but likewise did not file in the new 2nd district. Businessman Tim D'Annunzio and former North Carolina Republican Party communications director Kay Daly also ran before the district map changed and then switched to other districts.

The new district incorporated much of what had been the 13th district, leading that district's representative, George Holding, to file as a candidate in the 2nd, although his home was now in the 4th district. Meanwhile, Greg Brannon entered the 2nd district GOP primary as well, after losing the primary for U.S. Senate to incumbent Richard Burr.

Ellmers was subject to a high level of campaign spending by outside groups aligning themselves with the Tea Party movement, including Americans for Prosperity, which spent in the "low six figures" to defeat her. They opposed Ellmers for her votes on a bill related to abortion as well as votes on spending and budget bills, and to support the continuation of the Export-Import Bank.

==== Candidates ====
===== Nominee =====
- George Holding, incumbent U.S. Representative for North Carolina's 13th congressional district

===== Eliminated in primary =====
- Greg Brannon, physician, Tea Party activist and candidate for the U.S. Senate in 2014 & 2016
- Renee Ellmers, incumbent U.S. Representative

===== Withdrawn =====
- Kay Daly (running in the 13th district)
- Tim D'Annunzio, businessman, nominee for North Carolina's 4th congressional district in 2012 and candidate for North Carolina's 8th congressional district in 2010. (running in the 8th district)
- Jim Duncan, chair of the Chatham County Republican Party, co-founder of the grassroots organization The Coalition for American Principles
- Frank Roche, conservative internet talk show host and lecturer in economics at Elon University, candidate for this seat in 2012, candidate for North Carolina's 4th congressional district in 2010 and candidate for State Treasurer in 2012

==== Endorsements ====
Greg Brannon

Organizations

- Club for Growth (joint with Holding)
Jim Duncan (withdrawn)

Organizations

- Eagle Forum
Renee Ellmers

Individuals

- Donald Trump, businessmen and Republican nominee for President in 2016

Organizations

- Maggie's List
George Holding

Organizations

- Americans for Prosperity
- Club for Growth (joint with Brannon)
- FreedomWorks

==== Results ====
Republican primary results
Party	Candidate	Votes	%
Republican	George Holding (incumbent)	17,084	53.4
Republican	Renee Ellmers (incumbent)	7,552	23.6
Republican	Greg Brannon	7,359	23.0
Total votes		31,995	100.0

=== Democratic primary ===
Adam Coker was running unopposed for the Democratic nomination under the previous district map. After the new map was adopted, two candidates who had previously filed to run in the 13th district, like Holding, filed in the 2nd: John McNeil and Ron Sanyal. They were joined by three other candidates who had previously not filed for any seat.

==== Candidates ====
===== Nominee =====
- John P. McNeil, attorney and U.S. Marine Corps veteran

===== Eliminated in primary =====
- Elton R. Brewington
- Steven E. Hight
- Ron Sanyal, candidate for this seat in 2014
- Jane Watson, attorney

===== Withdrawn =====
- Adam Coker, small business owner and entrepreneur (running in 13th district)

==== Results ====
Democratic primary results
Party	Candidate	Votes	%
Democratic	John P. McNeil	7,613	46.1
Democratic	Jane Watson	3,875	23.5
Democratic	Steven E. Hight	1,870	11.3
Democratic	Ron Sanyal	1,761	10.7
Democratic	Elton R. Brewington	1,387	8.4
Total votes		16,506	100.0

=== General election ===
==== Predictions ====
Source	Ranking	As of
The Cook Political Report	Safe R	November 7, 2016
Daily Kos Elections	Safe R	November 7, 2016
Rothenberg	Safe R	November 3, 2016
Sabato's Crystal Ball	Safe R	November 7, 2016
RCP	Safe R	October 31, 2016

==== Endorsements ====
George Holding (R)

Organizations

- American Conservative Union
- Americans for Prosperity
- Campaign for Working Families
- Club for Growth
- FreedomWorks
- NRA Political Victory Fund
John P. McNeil (D)

Organizations

- National Organization for Women
- North Carolina Association of Educators
- The People's Alliance

Newspapers

- Indy Week

==== Results ====
North Carolina's 2nd congressional district, 2016
Party	Candidate	Votes	%
Republican	George Holding (incumbent)	221,485	56.7
Democratic	John P. McNeil	169,082	43.3
Total votes		390,567	100.0
Republican hold			

== District 3 ==
2016 North Carolina's 3rd congressional district election
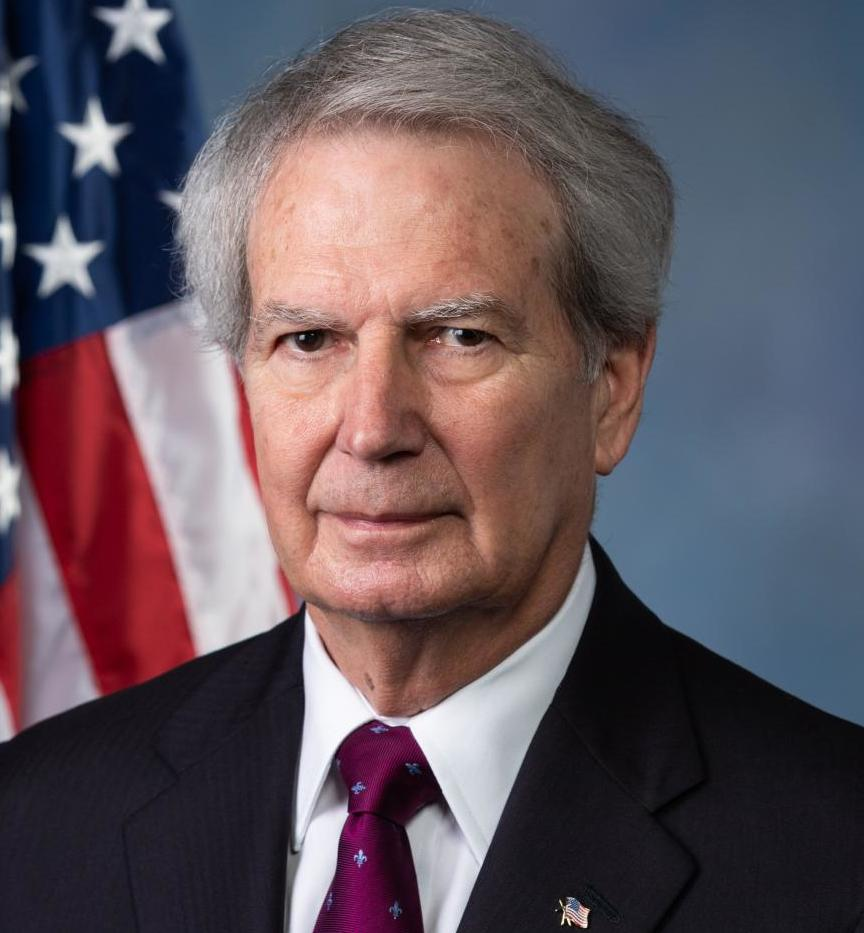

Nominee	Walter B. Jones Jr.	Ernest T. Reeves
Party	Republican	Democratic
Popular vote	217,531	106,170
Percentage	67.2%	32.8%
- County results Jones: 50–60% 60–70% 70–80%
U.S. Representative before election
Walter B. Jones Jr.
Republican
Elected U.S. Representative
Walter B. Jones Jr.
Republican

The 3rd district is located on the Atlantic coast of North Carolina. It covers the Outer Banks and the counties adjacent to the Pamlico Sound. The new map made the district somewhat more compact, removing some of its more southern and western areas. Incumbent Republican Walter B. Jones Jr., who had represented the district since 1995, ran for re-election. He was re-elected with 68% of the vote in 2014. The district had a PVI of R+11.

=== Republican primary ===
Jones, who has a reputation as a maverick, ran for re-election, saying "I like to be a thorn in people's ass". Taylor Griffin, a one-time aide to United States Senator Jesse Helms and to President George W. Bush, ran against Jones in the Republican primary again in 2016, just as he had done in 2014.

==== Candidates ====
===== Nominee =====
- Walter B. Jones Jr., incumbent U.S. Representative

===== Eliminated in primary =====
- Taylor Griffin, former aide to Senator Jesse Helms and President George W. Bush, candidate for this seat in 2014
- Phil Law, Hewlett-Packard site supervisor and Marine veteran

==== Endorsements ====
Walter Jones Jr.

Organizations

- Eagle Forum

==== Results ====
Republican primary results
Party	Candidate	Votes	%
Republican	Walter B. Jones Jr. (incumbent)	15,799	64.9
Republican	Phil Law	4,946	20.3
Republican	Taylor Griffin	3,610	14.8
Total votes		24,355	100.0

=== Democratic primary ===
David Allan Hurst was running unopposed for the Democratic nomination under the old map. After the new district map was adopted, he was joined by U.S. Army veteran Ernest T. Reeves, who had just lost the Democratic primary for U.S. Senate to Deborah Ross.

==== Candidates ====
===== Nominee =====
- Ernest T. Reeves, candidate for U.S. Senate in 2014 and 2016

===== Eliminated in primary =====
- David Allan Hurst

==== Results ====
Democratic primary results
Party	Candidate	Votes	%
Democratic	Ernest T. Reeves	6,456	54.7
Democratic	David Allan Hurst	5,351	45.3
Total votes		11,807	100.0

=== General election ===
==== Endorsements ====
Walter Jones Jr. (R)

Organizations

- NRA Political Victory Fund

==== Predictions ====
Source	Ranking	As of
The Cook Political Report	Safe R	November 7, 2016
Daily Kos Elections	Safe R	November 7, 2016
Rothenberg	Safe R	November 3, 2016
Sabato's Crystal Ball	Safe R	November 7, 2016
RCP	Safe R	October 31, 2016

==== Results ====
North Carolina's 3rd congressional district, 2016
Party	Candidate	Votes	%
Republican	Walter B. Jones Jr. (incumbent)	217,531	67.2
Democratic	Ernest T. Reeves	106,170	32.8
Total votes		323,701	100.0
Republican hold			

== District 4 ==
2016 North Carolina's 4th congressional district election
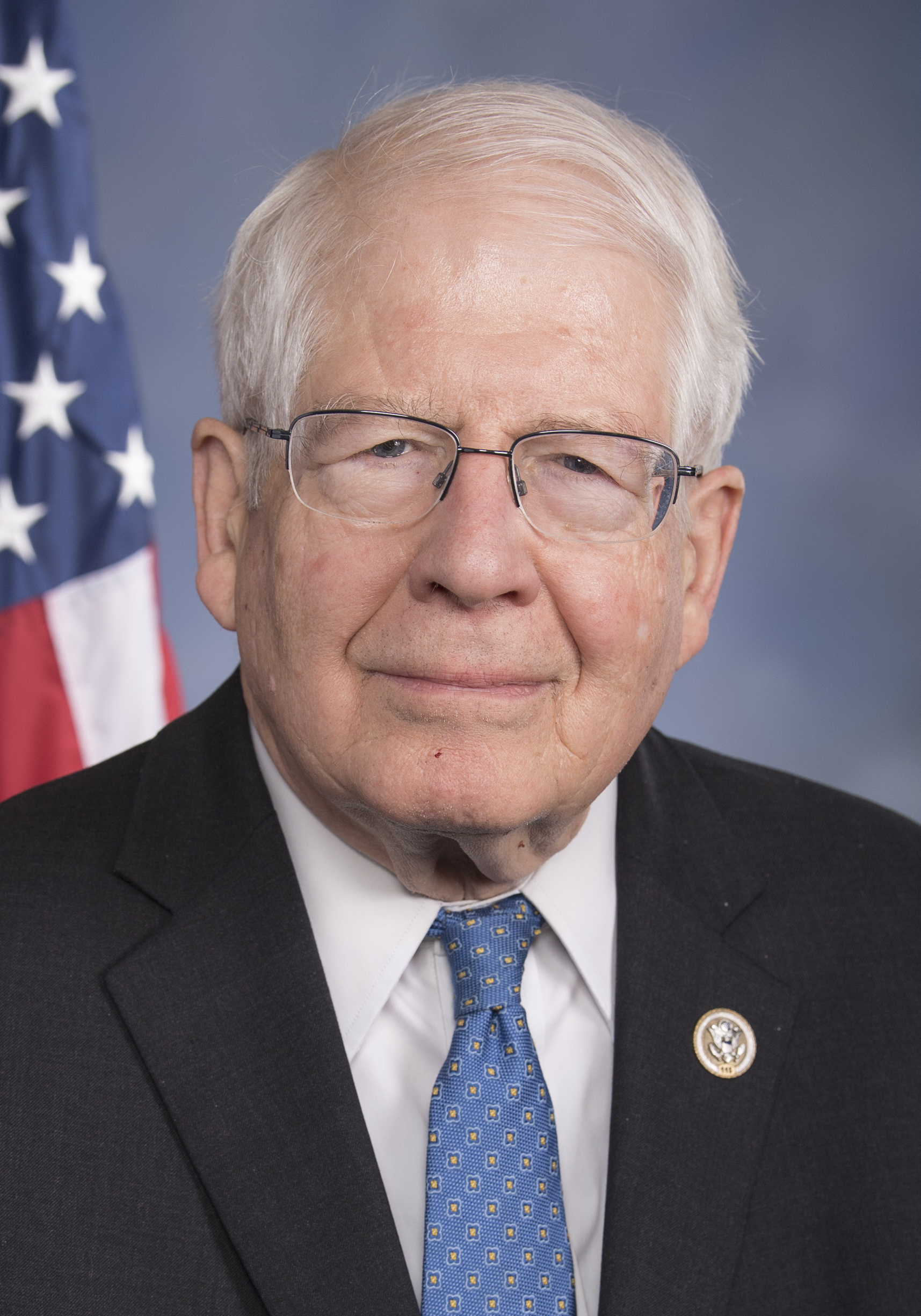

Nominee	David Price	Sue Googe
Party	Democratic	Republican
Popular vote	279,380	130,161
Percentage	68.2%	31.8%
- County results Price: 60–70% 70–80%
U.S. Representative before election
David Price
Democratic
Elected U.S. Representative
David Price
Democratic

The 4th district is located in the Research Triangle area. The new map made the 4th district more compact, removing its southern portions. Incumbent Democrat David Price, who had represented the district since 1997, and previously represented it from 1987 to 1995, ran for re-election. He was re-elected with 75% of the vote in 2014. The district had a PVI of D+13.

=== Democratic primary ===
==== Candidates ====
===== Nominee =====
- David Price, incumbent U.S. Representative

=== Republican primary ===
Sue Googe, a first-generation Chinese immigrant, filed to challenge Price.

==== Candidates ====
===== Nominee =====
- Sue Googe, real estate investment company founder

===== Eliminated in primary =====
- Teiji Kimball, U.S. Army Reserve member and veteran

==== Results ====
Republican primary results
Party	Candidate	Votes	%
Republican	Sue Googe	10,947	71.3
Republican	Teiji Kimball	4,399	28.7
Total votes		15,346	100.0

=== General election ===
==== Endorsements ====
David Price (D)

Labor unions

- AFL-CIO
- Communications Workers of America
- International Brotherhood of Boilermakers

Organizations

- National Organization for Women
Sue Googe

Organizations

- Maggie's List

==== Predictions ====
Source	Ranking	As of
The Cook Political Report	Safe D	November 7, 2016
Daily Kos Elections	Safe D	November 7, 2016
Rothenberg	Safe D	November 3, 2016
Sabato's Crystal Ball	Safe D	November 7, 2016
RCP	Safe D	October 31, 2016

==== Results ====
North Carolina's 4th congressional district, 2016
Party	Candidate	Votes	%
Democratic	David Price (incumbent)	279,380	68.2
Republican	Sue Googe	130,161	31.8
Total votes		409,541	100.0
Democratic hold			

== District 5 ==
2016 North Carolina's 5th congressional district election
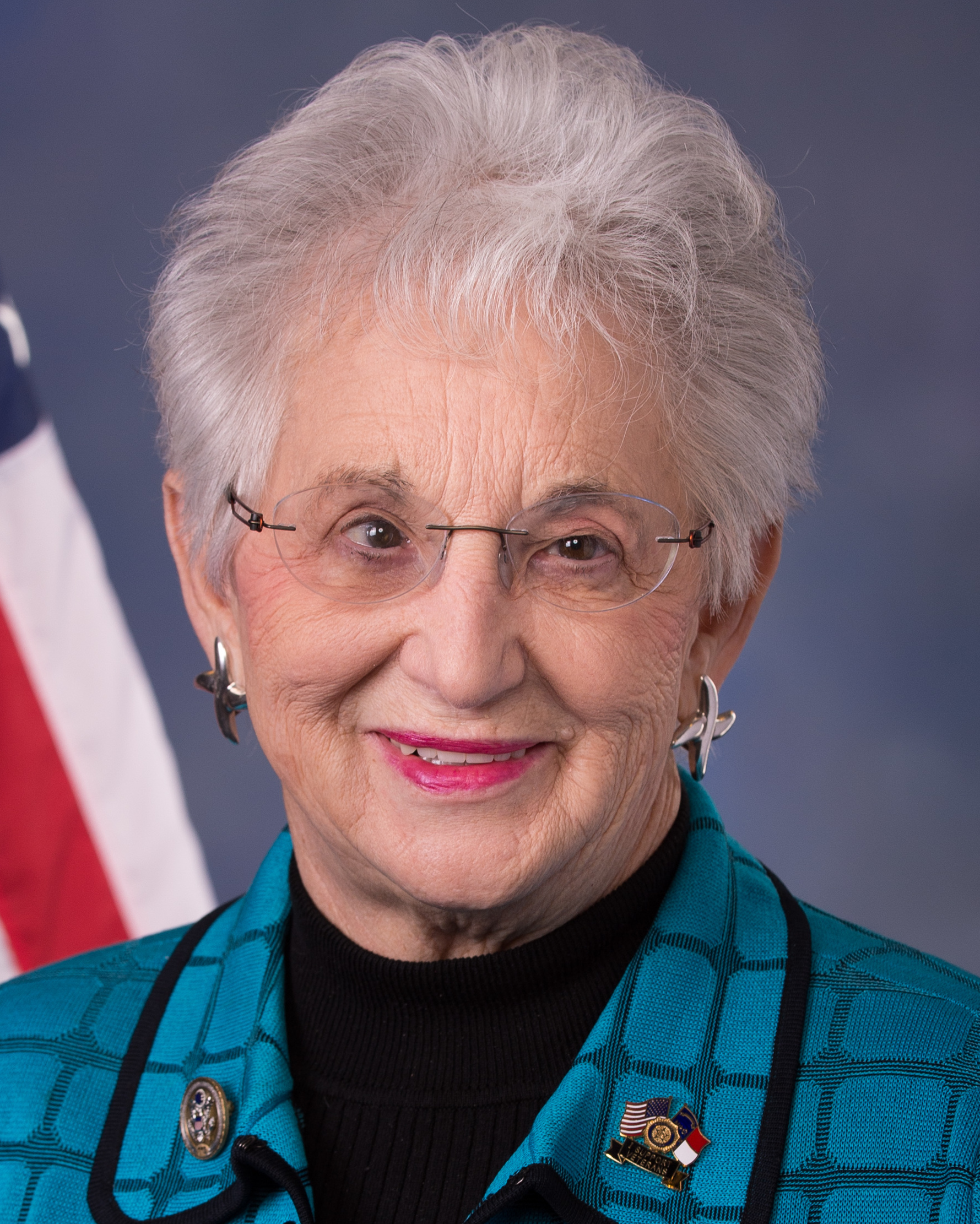

Nominee	Virginia Foxx	Josh Brannon
Party	Republican	Democratic
Popular vote	207,625	147,887
Percentage	58.4%	41.6%
- County results Foxx: 60–70% 70–80% Brannon: 50–60%
U.S. Representative before election
Virginia Foxx
Republican
Elected U.S. Representative
Virginia Foxx
Republican

The 5th district is located in northwestern North Carolina, from the Appalachian Mountains to the Piedmont Triad area. The new map shifted the district slightly to the north and put the entirety of Forsyth County in the district. Incumbent Republican Virginia Foxx, who had represented the district since 2005, ran for re-election. She was re-elected with 61% of the vote in 2014. The district had a PVI of R+9.

=== Republican primary ===
==== Candidates ====
===== Nominee =====
- Virginia Foxx, incumbent U.S. Representative

===== Eliminated in primary =====
- Pattie Curran, Tea Party activist

==== Results ====
Republican primary results
Party	Candidate	Votes	%
Republican	Virginia Foxx (incumbent)	17,162	67.9
Republican	Pattie Curran	8,098	32.1
Total votes		25,260	100.0

=== Democratic primary ===
Josh Brannon, the 2014 nominee for this seat, was running unopposed for the Democratic nomination under the previous district map. After the new district map was adopted, he was joined by two other challengers, including Jim Roberts, who had previously been running in the 6th district.

==== Candidates ====
===== Nominee =====
- Josh Brannon, software developer and nominee for this seat in 2014

===== Eliminated in primary =====
- Jim Roberts, former president of the North Carolina Pest Management Association and U.S. Air Force veteran
- Charlie Wallin

==== Results ====
Democratic primary results
Party	Candidate	Votes	%
Democratic	Josh Brannon	7,430	47.7
Democratic	Charlie Wallin	4,184	26.9
Democratic	Jim Roberts	3,959	25.4
Total votes		15,573	100.0

=== General election ===
==== Endorsements ====
Virginia Foxx (R)

Organizations

- Campaign for Working Families
- Maggie's List
- NRA Political Victory Fund

==== Predictions ====
Source	Ranking	As of
The Cook Political Report	Safe R	November 7, 2016
Daily Kos Elections	Safe R	November 7, 2016
Rothenberg	Safe R	November 3, 2016
Sabato's Crystal Ball	Safe R	November 7, 2016
RCP	Safe R	October 31, 2016

==== Results ====
North Carolina's 5th congressional district, 2016
Party	Candidate	Votes	%
Republican	Virginia Foxx (incumbent)	207,625	58.4
Democratic	Josh Brannon	147,887	41.6
Total votes		355,512	100.0
Republican hold			

== District 6 ==
2016 North Carolina's 6th congressional district election
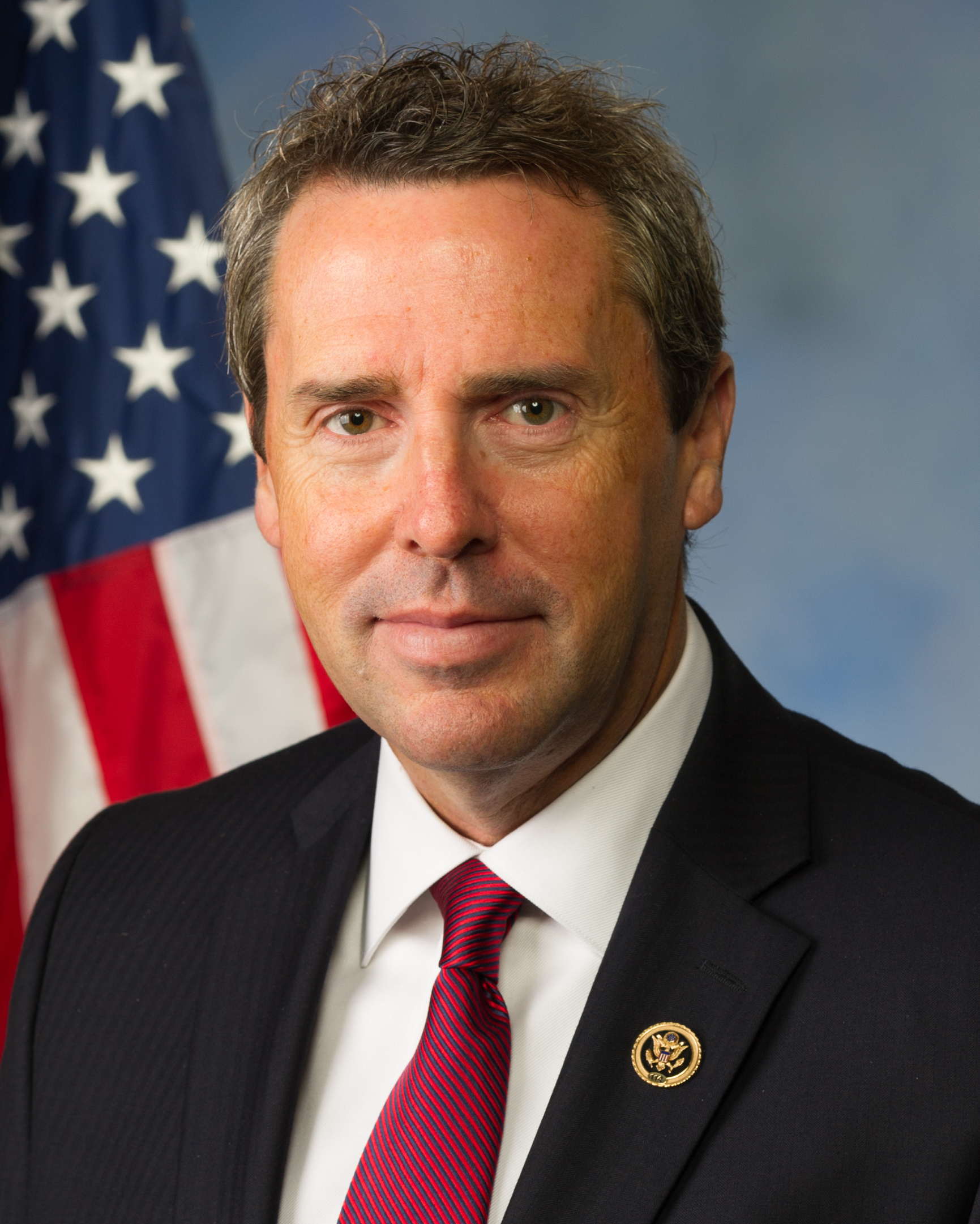

Nominee	Mark Walker	Pete Glidewell
Party	Republican	Democratic
Popular vote	207,983	143,167
Percentage	59.2%	40.8%
- County results Walker: 50–60% 60–70% 70–80% Glidewell: 50–60%
U.S. Representative before election
Mark Walker
Republican
Elected U.S. Representative
Mark Walker
Republican

The 6th district is located in northern-central North Carolina. The new map made the district more compact, removing some western, eastern and southern portions. The incumbent was Republican Mark Walker, who had represented the district since 2015. He was elected with 59% of the vote in 2014, succeeding retiring Republican incumbent Howard Coble.

=== Republican primary ===
==== Candidates ====
===== Nominee =====
- Mark Walker, incumbent U.S. Representative

===== Eliminated in primary =====
- Chris Hardin, pharmaceutical representative

===== Withdrawn =====
- Kenn Kopf, attorney and candidate for this seat in 2014 (withdrew December 21, 2015)

==== Results ====
Republican primary results
Party	Candidate	Votes	%
Republican	Mark Walker (incumbent)	16,859	77.9
Republican	Chris Hardin	4,777	22.1
Total votes		21,636	100.0

=== Democratic primary ===
Former Guilford County Commissioner Bruce Davis, former Alamance County Democratic Party Chairman Pete Glidewell and Jim Roberts were seeking the Democratic nomination to challenge Walker under the old map. After the new map was adopted, Davis and Roberts filed to run in different districts, leaving Glidewell unopposed for the nomination.

==== Candidates ====
===== Nominee =====
- Pete Glidewell, former Alamance County Democratic Party Chair

===== Withdrawn =====
- Bruce Davis, former Guilford County Commissioner (running in the 13th district)
- Jim Roberts (running in the 5th district)

=== General election ===
==== Endorsements ====
Mark Walker (R)

Organizations

- NRA Political Victory Fund

==== Predictions ====
Source	Ranking	As of
The Cook Political Report	Safe R	November 7, 2016
Daily Kos Elections	Safe R	November 7, 2016
Rothenberg	Safe R	November 3, 2016
Sabato's Crystal Ball	Safe R	November 7, 2016
RCP	Likely R	October 31, 2016

==== Results ====
North Carolina's 6th congressional district, 2016
Party	Candidate	Votes	%
Republican	Mark Walker (incumbent)	207,983	59.2
Democratic	Pete Glidewell	143,167	40.8
Total votes		351,150	100.0
Republican hold			

== District 7 ==
2016 North Carolina's 7th congressional district election
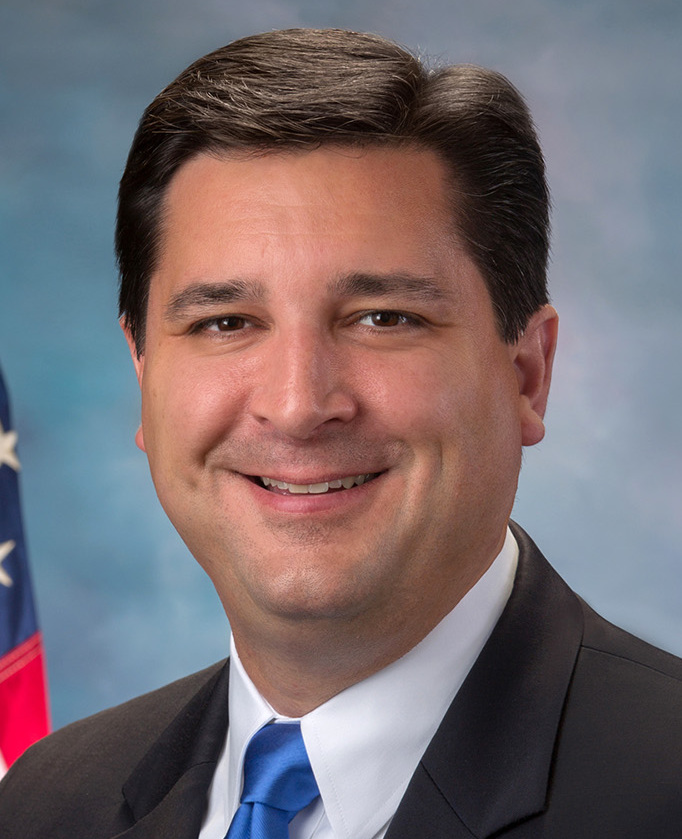

Nominee	David Rouzer	J. Wesley Casteen
Party	Republican	Democratic
Popular vote	211,801	135,905
Percentage	60.9%	39.1%
- County results Rouzer: 50–60% 60–70% 70–80% Casteen: 50–60%
U.S. Representative before election
David Rouzer
Republican
Elected U.S. Representative
David Rouzer
Republican

The 7th district is located in southeastern North Carolina. The new map shifted the district slightly to the east, but much of it remained the same. The incumbent was Republican David Rouzer, who had represented the district since 2015. He was elected with 59% of the vote in 2014, succeeding retiring Democratic incumbent Mike McIntyre.

=== Republican primary ===
Rouzer is running for re-election to a second term. Former North Carolina Republican Party second congressional district Chairman Mark Otto was challenging Rouzer for the Republican nomination under the old map, but did not file his candidacy under the new map.

==== Candidates ====
===== Nominee =====
- David Rouzer, incumbent U.S. Representative

===== Withdrawn =====
- Mark Otto, former North Carolina Republican Party second congressional district chair

===== Declined =====
- Haywood "Woody" White, New Hanover County Commissioner, former state senator and candidate for this seat in 2014

=== Democratic primary ===
==== Candidates ====
===== Nominee =====
- J. Wesley Casteen, attorney, CPA, and Libertarian nominee for this seat in 2014

=== General election ===
==== Endorsements ====
David Rouzer (R)

Organizations

- Campaign for Working Families
- NRA Political Victory Fund

==== Predictions ====
Source	Ranking	As of
The Cook Political Report	Safe R	November 7, 2016
Daily Kos Elections	Safe R	November 7, 2016
Rothenberg	Safe R	November 3, 2016
Sabato's Crystal Ball	Safe R	November 7, 2016
RCP	Safe R	October 31, 2016

==== Results ====
North Carolina's 7th congressional district, 2016
Party	Candidate	Votes	%
Republican	David Rouzer (incumbent)	211,801	60.9
Democratic	J. Wesley Casteen	135,905	39.1
Total votes		347,706	100.0
Republican hold			

== District 8 ==
2016 North Carolina's 8th congressional district election
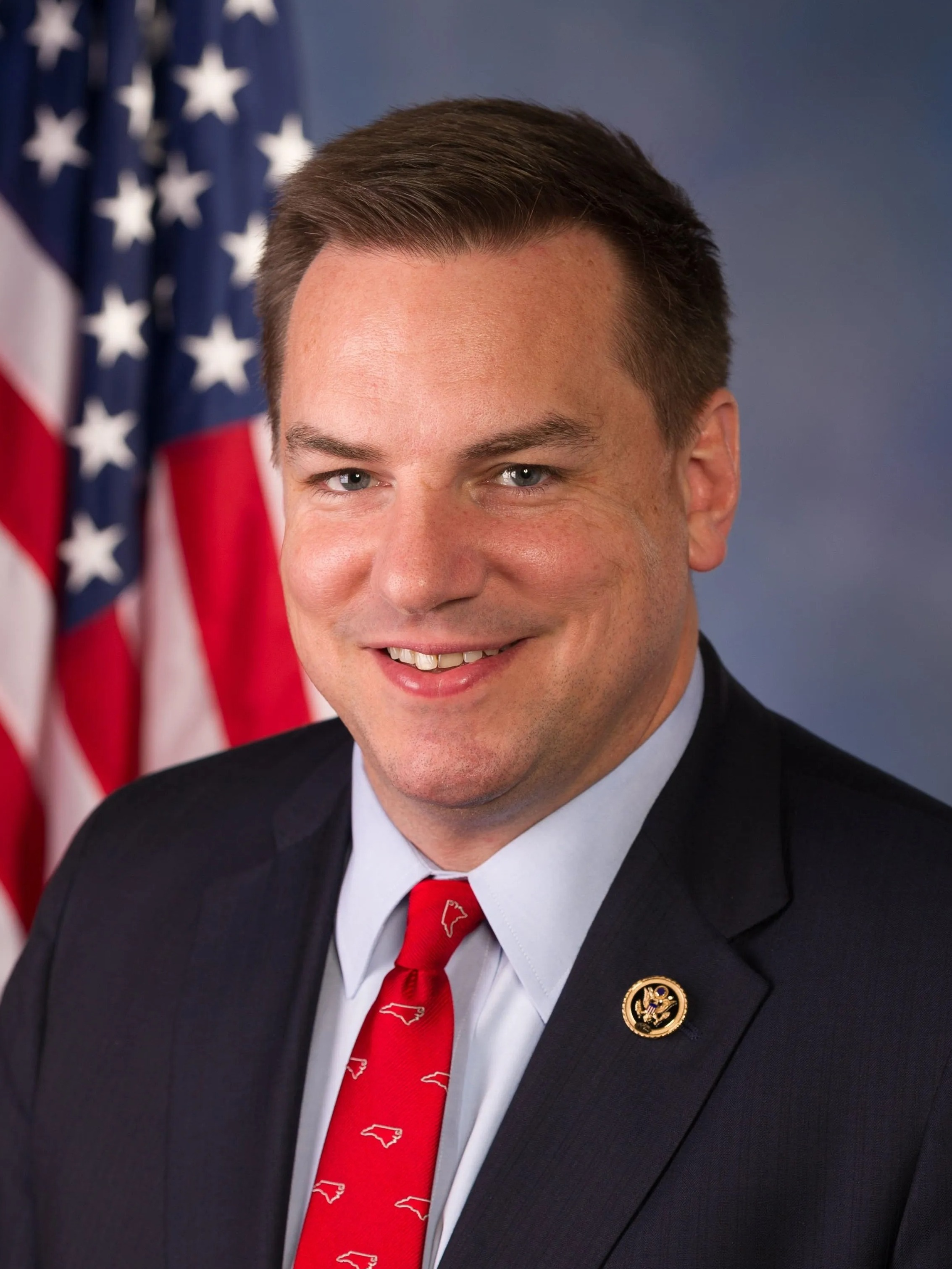

Nominee	Richard Hudson	Thomas Mills
Party	Republican	Democratic
Popular vote	189,863	133,182
Percentage	58.8%	41.2%
- County results Hudson: 60–70% 70–80% Mills: 50–60%
U.S. Representative before election
Richard Hudson
Republican
Elected U.S. Representative
Richard Hudson
Republican

The 8th district is located in southern-central North Carolina. The new map shifted the district slightly to the north and to the east. The incumbent was Republican Richard Hudson, who had represented the district since 2013. He was re-elected with 65% of the vote in 2014.

=== Republican primary ===
Richard Hudson ran for re-election to a third term, and was unopposed for the Republican nomination under the old map. After the new district map was adopted, Tim D'Annunzio, who had been running in the 2nd district, filed instead to run in the 8th.

==== Candidates ====
===== Nominee =====
- Richard Hudson, incumbent U.S. Representative

===== Eliminated in primary =====
- Tim D'Annunzio, businessman, nominee for North Carolina's 4th congressional district in 2012 and candidate this district in 2010.

===== Declined =====
- Wes Rhinier, Rowan County Republican Party Executive Committee member

==== Results ====
Republican primary results
Party	Candidate	Votes	%
Republican	Richard Hudson (incumbent)	16,375	64.6
Republican	Tim D'Annunzio	8,943	35.4
Total votes		25,248	100.0

=== Democratic primary ===
==== Candidates ====
===== Nominee =====
- Thomas Mills, political and public affairs consultant and Founder/Editor-Publisher of Politics NC

===== Declined =====
- Cal Cunningham, former state senator from the 23rd district and candidate for the U.S. Senate in 2010

=== General election ===
==== Endorsements ====
Richard Hudson (R)

Organizations

- Campaign for Working Families
- NRA Political Victory Fund
Thomas Mills (D)

Labor unions

- AFL-CIO
- International Brotherhood of Boilermakers

Organizations

- Sierra Club

==== Predictions ====
Source	Ranking	As of
The Cook Political Report	Safe R	November 7, 2016
Daily Kos Elections	Safe R	November 7, 2016
Rothenberg	Safe R	November 3, 2016
Sabato's Crystal Ball	Safe R	November 7, 2016
RCP	Likely R	October 31, 2016

==== Results ====
North Carolina's 8th congressional district, 2016
Party	Candidate	Votes	%
Republican	Richard Hudson (incumbent)	189,863	58.8
Democratic	Thomas Mills	133,182	41.2
Total votes		323,045	100.0
Republican hold			

== District 9 ==
2016 North Carolina's 9th congressional district election
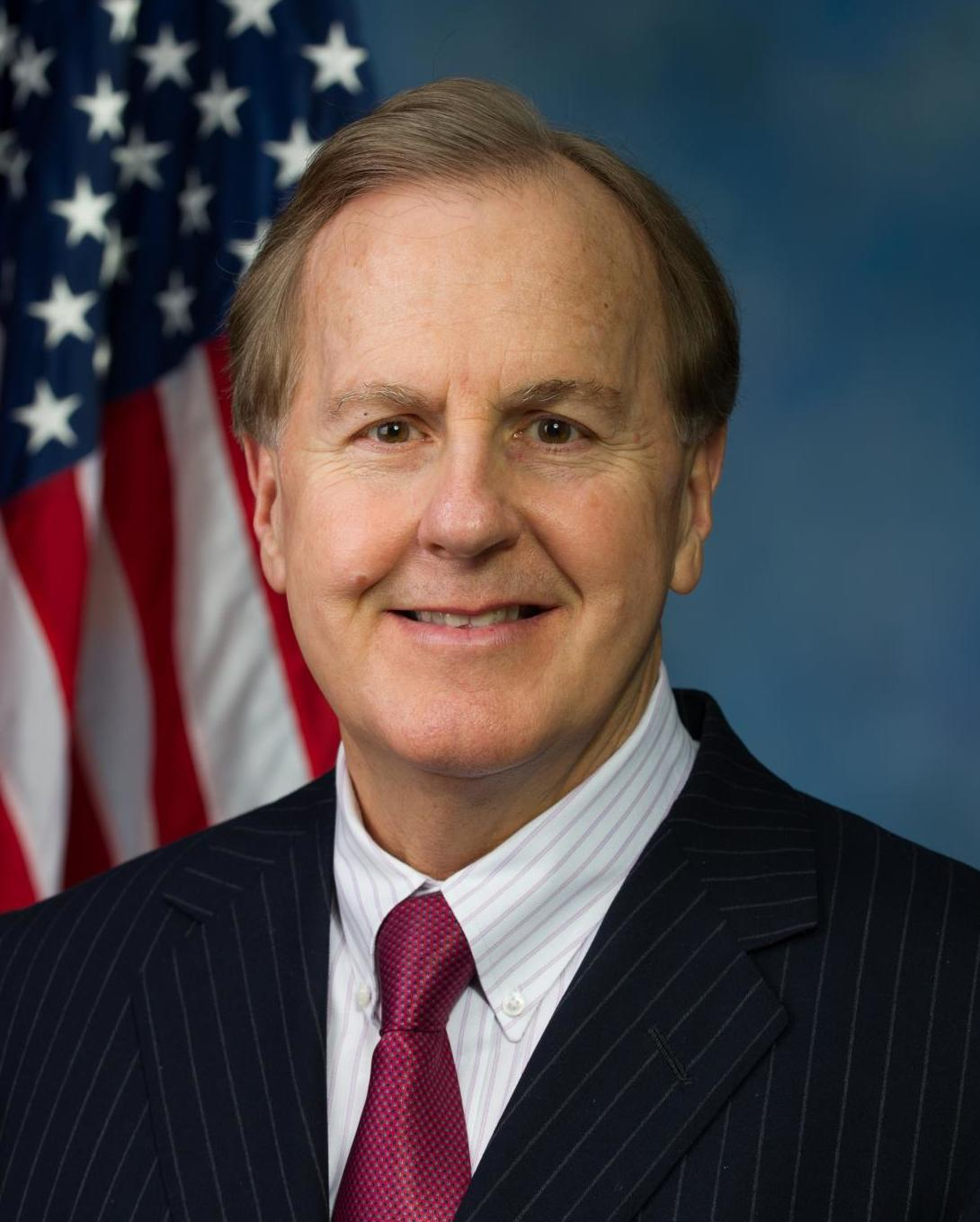

Candidate	Robert Pittenger	Christian Cano
Party	Republican	Democratic
Popular vote	193,452	139,041
Percentage	58.2%	41.8%
- County results Pittenger: 50–60% 60–70% Cano: 50–60%
U.S. Representative before election
Robert Pittenger
Republican
Elected U.S. Representative
Robert Pittenger
Republican

The 9th district is located in south-central North Carolina. The new map moved the 9th district to the east and to the south. The incumbent was Republican Robert Pittenger, who had represented the district since 2013. He was re-elected with 94% of the vote in 2014.

=== Republican primary ===
George Rouco, an attorney and former CIA officer, was challenging Pittenger for the Republican nomination under the old map. After the new map was adopted, Rouco filed to run in the 13th district instead. Meanwhile, two other Republicans filed to challenge Pittenger: Rev. Mark Harris, who ran in 2014 for the U.S. Senate and former Union County Commissioner Todd Johnson.

==== Candidates ====
===== Nominee =====
- Robert Pittenger, incumbent U.S. Representative

===== Eliminated in primary =====
- Mark Harris, pastor and candidate for U.S. Senate in 2014
- Todd Johnson, former Union County Commissioner

===== Withdrawn =====
- George Rouco, attorney and former CIA officer (running in the 13th district)

==== Endorsements ====
Robert Pittenger

U.S. Senators

- Richard Burr, U.S. Senator (R-NC)

U.S. Representatives

- Patrick McHenry, U.S. Representative

Statewide officials

- Jim Martin, former Governor

Individuals

- Richard Petty, NASCAR driver

==== Results ====
Republican primary results
Party	Candidate	Votes	%
Republican	Robert Pittenger (incumbent)	9,299	35.0
Republican	Mark Harris	9,165	34.4
Republican	Todd Johnson	8,142	30.6
Total votes		26,606	100.0

Harris called for a recount, as allowed under state law because Pittenger's margin of victory was so small.

=== Democratic primary ===
==== Candidates ====
===== Nominee =====
- Christian Cano, hotel manager and hospitality consultant

=== General election ===
==== Endorsements ====
Robert Pittenger (R)

Organizations

- Campaign for Working Families
- NRA Political Victory Fund
Christian Cano (D)

Labor unions

- AFL-CIO
- International Brotherhood of Boilermakers

Newspapers

- The Charlotte Observer

==== Predictions ====
Source	Ranking	As of
The Cook Political Report	Safe R	November 7, 2016
Daily Kos Elections	Safe R	November 7, 2016
Rothenberg	Safe R	November 3, 2016
Sabato's Crystal Ball	Safe R	November 7, 2016
RCP	Likely R	October 31, 2016

==== Results ====
North Carolina's 9th congressional district, 2016
Party	Candidate	Votes	%
Republican	Robert Pittenger (incumbent)	193,452	58.2
Democratic	Christian Cano	139,041	41.8
Total votes		332,493	100.0
Republican hold			

== District 10 ==
2016 North Carolina's 10th congressional district election
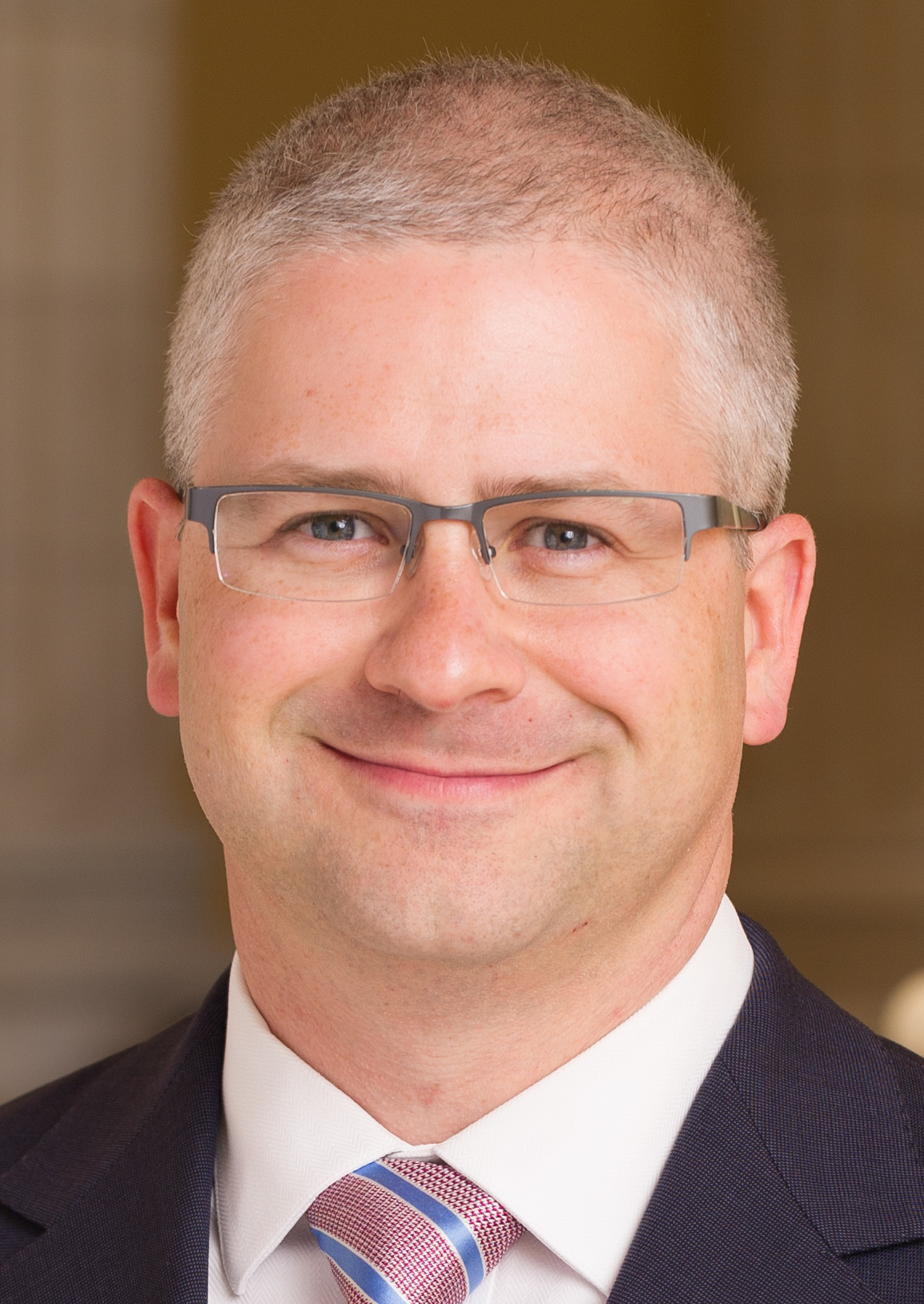

Nominee	Patrick McHenry	Andy Millard
Party	Republican	Democratic
Popular vote	220,825	128,919
Percentage	63.1%	36.9%
- County results Mchenry: 50–60% 60–70% 70–80% Millard: 60–70%
U.S. Representative before election
Patrick McHenry
Republican
Elected U.S. Representative
Patrick McHenry
Republican

The 10th district is located in central and western North Carolina. The new map made only minor changes to the district. The incumbent was Republican Patrick McHenry, who had represented the district since 2005. He was re-elected with 61% of the vote in 2014.

=== Republican primary ===
Patrick McHenry is running for re-election. He was being opposed by one candidate, Albert Wiley, in the Republican primary under the old map. After the new map was adopted, two more Republican challengers filed.

==== Candidates ====
===== Nominee =====
- Patrick McHenry, incumbent U.S. Representative

===== Eliminated in primary =====
- Jeffrey Baker
- Jeff Gregory, postmaster
- Albert Wiley Jr., physician and professor

==== Results ====
Republican primary results
Party	Candidate	Votes	%
Republican	Patrick McHenry (incumbent)	14,817	78.4
Republican	Jeff Gregory	2,277	12.1
Republican	Jeffrey Baker	905	4.8
Republican	Albert Lee Wiley Jr.	896	4.7
Total votes		18,895	100.0

=== Democratic primary ===
==== Candidates ====
===== Nominee =====
- Andy Millard, financial planner

=== General election ===
==== Endorsements ====
Patrick McHenry (R)

Organizations

- Campaign for Working Families
- NRA Political Victory Fund
Andy Millard (D)

Labor unions

- AFL-CIO
- International Brotherhood of Boilermakers

==== Predictions ====
Source	Ranking	As of
The Cook Political Report	Safe R	November 7, 2016
Daily Kos Elections	Safe R	November 7, 2016
Rothenberg	Safe R	November 3, 2016
Sabato's Crystal Ball	Safe R	November 7, 2016
RCP	Safe R	October 31, 2016

==== Results ====
North Carolina's 10th congressional district, 2016
Party	Candidate	Votes	%
Republican	Patrick McHenry (incumbent)	220,825	63.1
Democratic	Andy Millard	128,919	36.9
Total votes		349,744	100.0
Republican hold			

== District 11 ==
2016 North Carolina's 11th congressional district election
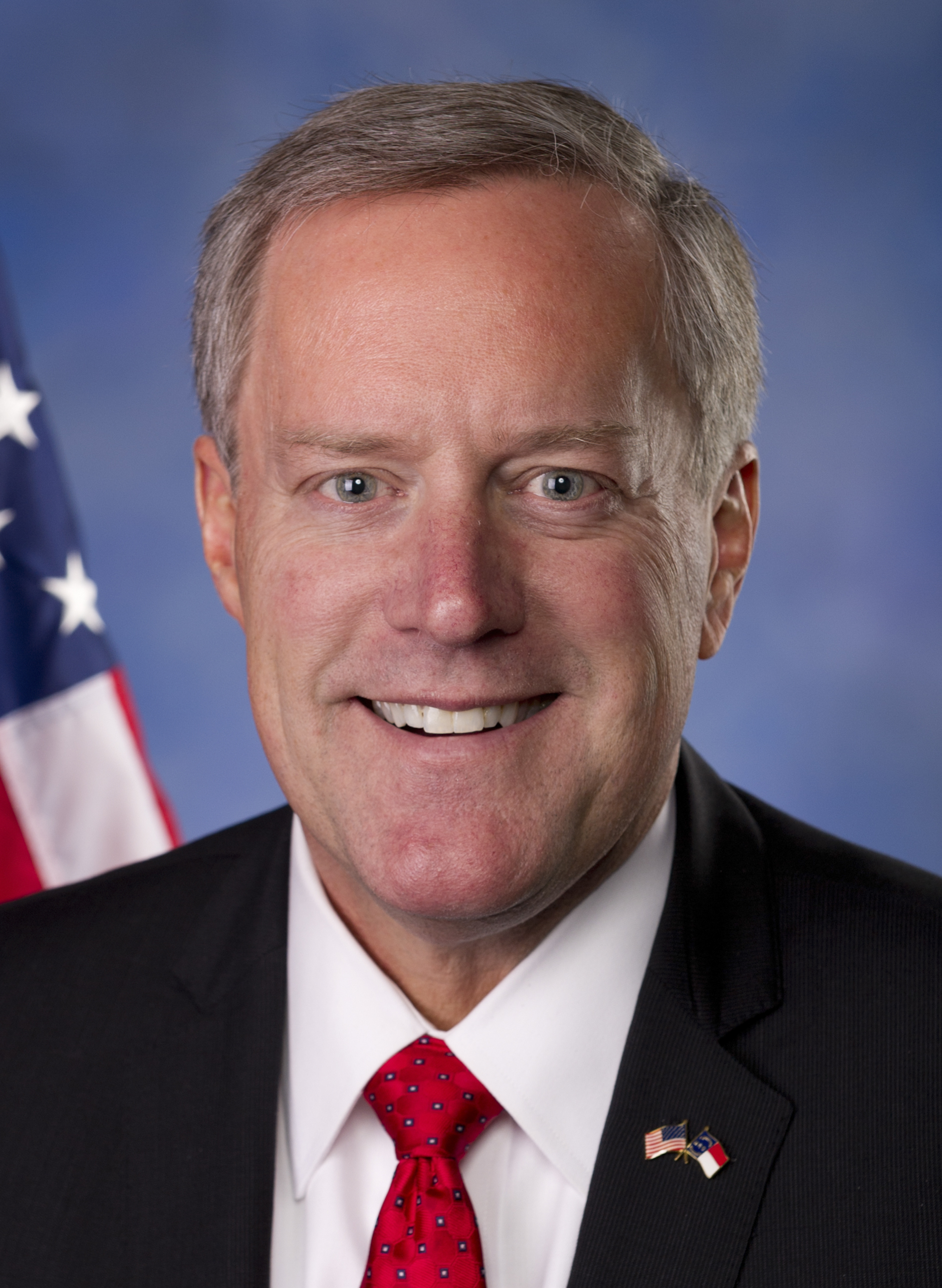

Nominee	Mark Meadows	Rick Bryson
Party	Republican	Democratic
Popular vote	230,405	129,103
Percentage	64.1%	35.9%
- County results Meadows: 50–60% 60–70% 70–80%
U.S. Representative before election
Mark Meadows
Republican
Elected U.S. Representative
Mark Meadows
Republican

The 11th district is located in western North Carolina. The new map made only minor changes to the district. The incumbent was Republican Mark Meadows, who had represented the district since 2013. He was re-elected with 63% of the vote in 2014.

=== Republican primary ===
==== Candidates ====
===== Nominee =====
- Mark Meadows, incumbent U.S. Representative

=== Democratic primary ===
==== Candidates ====
===== Nominee =====
- Rick Bryson, Bryson City Alderman

===== Eliminated in primary =====
- Tom Hill, physicist, nominee for this seat in 2014 and candidate for this seat 2012

==== Results ====
Democratic primary results
Party	Candidate	Votes	%
Democratic	Rick Bryson	9,695	50.7
Democratic	Tom Hill	9,440	49.3
Total votes		19,099	100.0

=== General election ===
==== Endorsements ====
Mark Meadows (R)

Organizations

- Eagle Forum
- NRA Political Victory Fund
Rick Bryson (D)

Labor unions

- AFL-CIO
- International Brotherhood of Boilermakers

==== Predictions ====
Source	Ranking	As of
The Cook Political Report	Safe R	November 7, 2016
Daily Kos Elections	Safe R	November 7, 2016
Rothenberg	Safe R	November 3, 2016
Sabato's Crystal Ball	Safe R	November 7, 2016
RCP	Safe R	October 31, 2016

==== Results ====
North Carolina's 11th congressional district, 2016
Party	Candidate	Votes	%
Republican	Mark Meadows (incumbent)	230,405	64.1
Democratic	Rick Bryson	129,103	35.9
Total votes		359,508	100.0
Republican hold			

== District 12 ==
2016 North Carolina's 12th congressional district election
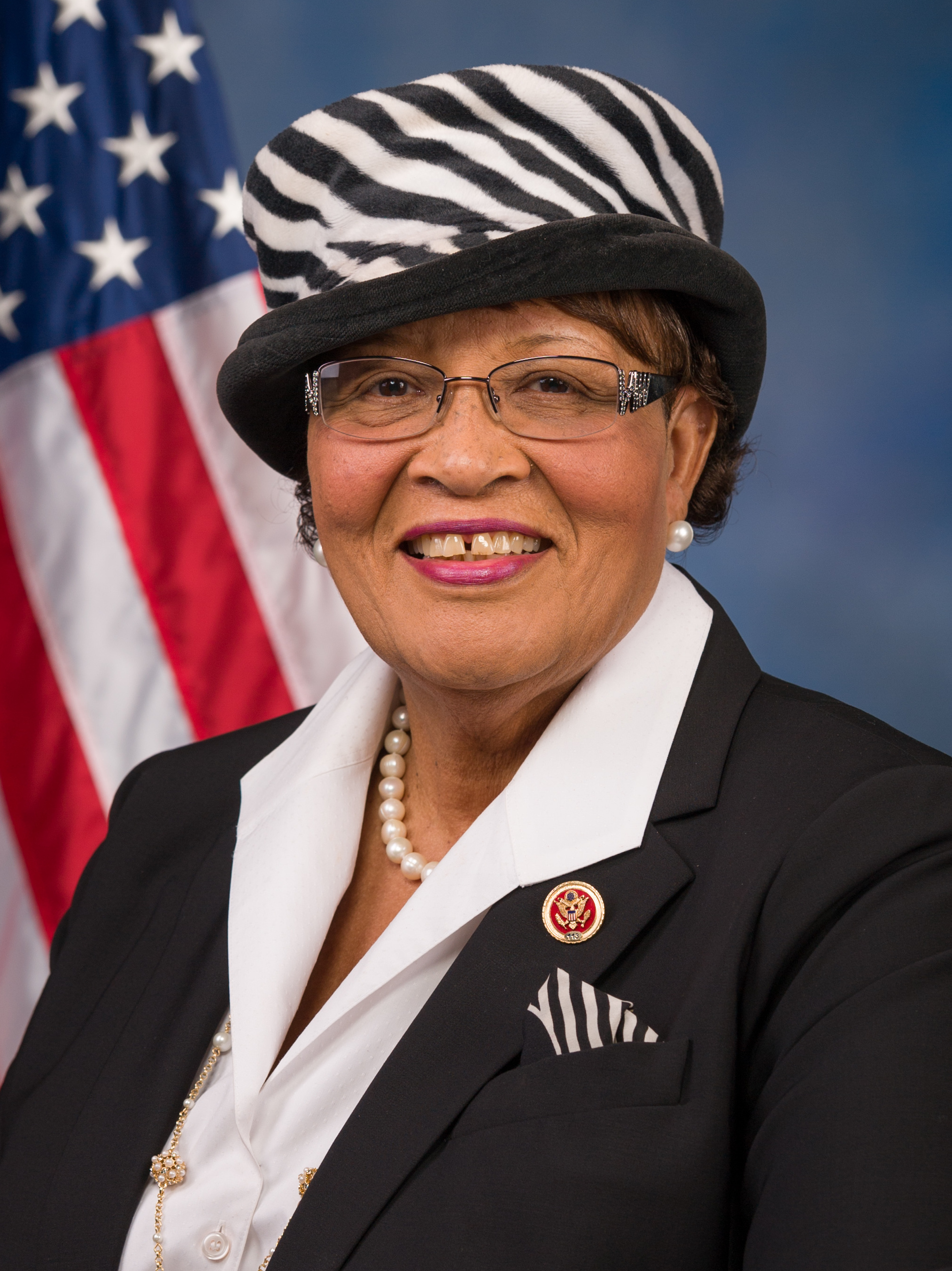

Nominee	Alma Adams	Leon Threatt
Party	Democratic	Republican
Popular vote	234,115	115,185
Percentage	67.0%	33.0%
- County results Adams: 60–70%
U.S. Representative before election
Alma Adams
Democratic
Elected U.S. Representative
Alma Adams
Democratic

The 12th district includes nearly all of Charlotte and surrounding Mecklenburg County. The new 2016 map made major changes to the 12th district, which had previously been a narrow district that included parts of Winston-Salem, Greensboro, Lexington, Salisbury, Concord, and High Point, as well as parts of Charlotte. The incumbent was Democrat Alma Adams, who had represented the district since 2014. She was elected with 75% of the vote in 2014.

=== Democratic primary ===
Alma Adams is running for re-election to a second term. Adams' home in Greensboro was removed from the 12th district, but she announced she would move to Charlotte. Gardenia Henley, a retired U.S. diplomat, Inspector General Auditor and frequent candidate who ran in 2014 for the 5th district, was challenging Adams for the Democratic nomination under the previous map, and continued to run after the map changed.

Former state senator Malcolm Graham of Mecklenburg County, who lost the 2014 primary to Adams (44%–24%), was rumored as a potential primary challenger. Subsequently, Graham did not run under the map in place at the time. Later, however, after the new district map was adopted, Graham filed to run. Three members of the North Carolina House of Representatives who represent parts of Mecklenburg County also ran: Tricia Cotham, Carla Cunningham and Rodney W. Moore. Moore later suspended his campaign, but his name remained on the ballot.

==== Candidates ====
===== Nominee =====
- Alma Adams, incumbent U.S. Representative

===== Eliminated in primary =====
- Tricia Cotham, state representative
- Carla Cunningham, state representative
- Malcolm Graham, former state senator from the 40th district
- Gardenia Henley, retired U.S. Agency for International Development auditor, candidate for state representative in 2010, for governor in 2012, for Mayor of Winston-Salem in 2013, and candidate for North Carolina's 5th congressional district in 2014
- Rick Miller

===== Withdrawn =====
- Juan Antonio Marin Jr.
- Rodney W. Moore, state representative

==== Results ====
Democratic primary results
Party	Candidate	Votes	%
Democratic	Alma Adams (incumbent)	12,400	42.5
Democratic	Malcolm Graham	8,428	28.9
Democratic	Tricia Cotham	6,165	21.1
Democratic	Carla D. Cunningham	1,255	4.3
Democratic	Gardenia Henley	444	1.5
Democratic	Rodney W. Moore (Withdrawn)	245	0.8
Democratic	Rick Miller	235	0.8
Total votes		29,172	100.0

=== Republican primary ===
==== Candidates ====
===== Nominee =====
- Leon Threatt, pastor and former police officer

===== Eliminated in primary =====
- Ryan Duffie, securities trader
- Paul Wright, attorney, former District Court & Superior Court judge, candidate for Governor of North Carolina in 2012, nominee for North Carolina's 4th congressional district in 2014 and candidate for U.S. Senate in 2016

==== Results ====
Republican primary results
Party	Candidate	Votes	%
Republican	Leon Threatt	3,495	41.8
Republican	Paul Wright	2,894	34.6
Republican	Ryan Duffie	1,973	23.6
Total votes		8,362	100.0

=== General election ===
==== Endorsements ====
Alma Adams (D)

Labor unions

- AFL-CIO
- Communications Workers of America
- International Brotherhood of Boilermakers

Organizations

- Congressional Progressive Caucus
- EMILY's List
- End Citizens United
- National Organization for Women

==== Predictions ====
Source	Ranking	As of
The Cook Political Report	Safe D	November 7, 2016
Daily Kos Elections	Safe D	November 7, 2016
Rothenberg	Safe D	November 3, 2016
Sabato's Crystal Ball	Safe D	November 7, 2016
RCP	Safe D	October 31, 2016

==== Results ====
North Carolina's 12th congressional district, 2016
Party	Candidate	Votes	%
Democratic	Alma Adams (incumbent)	234,115	67.0
Republican	Leon Threatt	115,185	33.0
Total votes		349,300	100.0
Democratic hold			

== District 13 ==
2016 North Carolina's 13th congressional district election
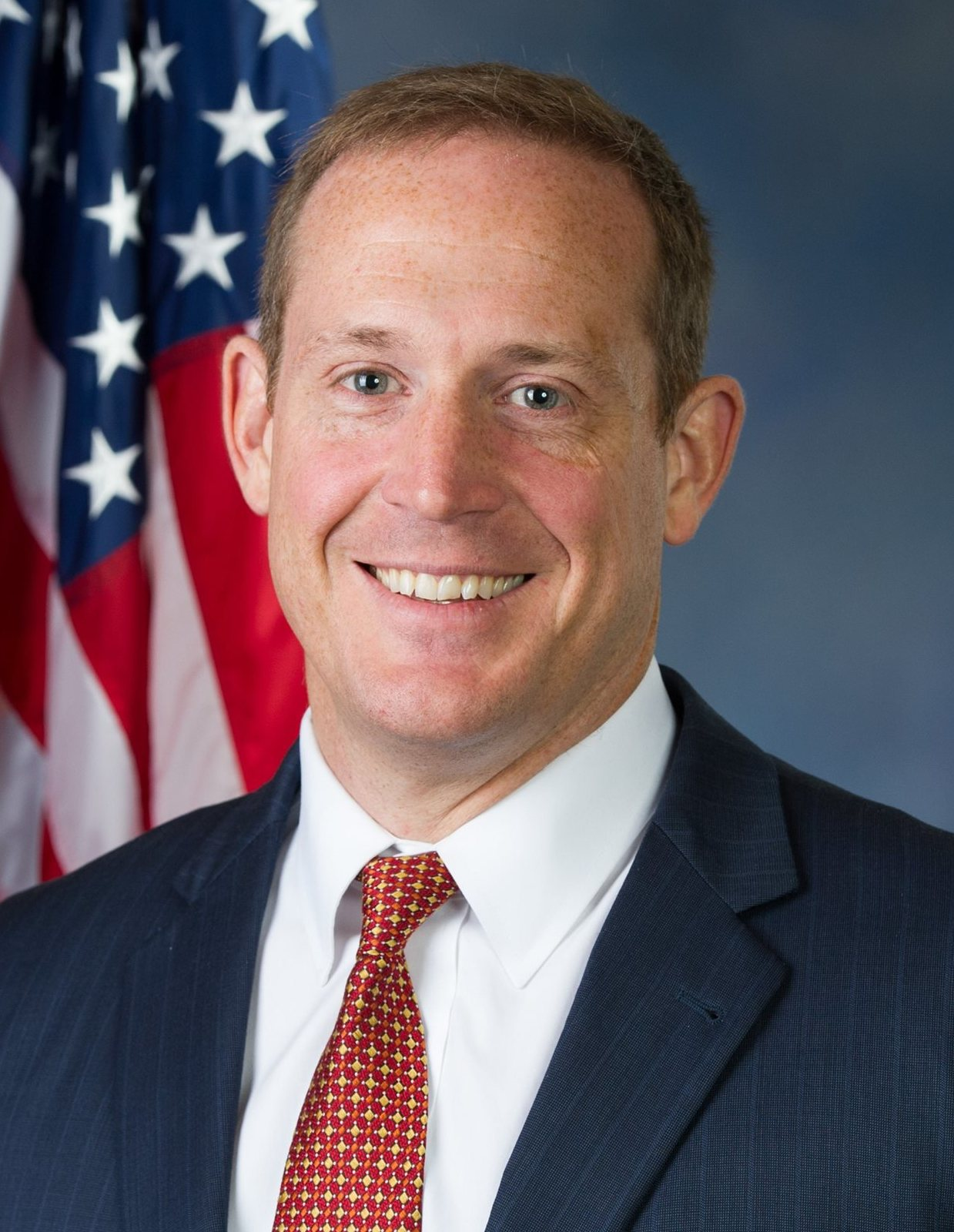

Nominee	Ted Budd	Bruce Davis
Party	Republican	Democratic
Popular vote	199,443	156,049
Percentage	56.1%	43.9%
- County results Budd: 50–60% 60–70% 70–80% Davis: 60–70%
U.S. Representative before election
George Holding
Republican
Elected U.S. Representative
Ted Budd
Republican

The 13th district is located primarily in the Piedmont Triad area. The new map completely moved the 13th district, which had previously consisted of parts of Wake County and eastern North Carolina. The incumbent was Republican George Holding, who had represented the district since 2013. He was re-elected with 57% of the vote in 2014.

=== Republican primary ===
George Holding had been running for re-election to a third term, and was unopposed for the Republican nomination, under the old map. After the new map was adopted, he filed to run in the 2nd district. The new district attracted a large field of Republican candidates of which Ted Budd, a gun shop owner who had never before run for public office, won the Republican nomination with only 20% of the vote.

==== Candidates ====
===== Nominee =====
- Ted Budd, gun shop owner

===== Eliminated in primary =====
- Dan Barrett, county commissioner and candidate for Governor in 2004
- John Blust, state representative
- Andrew C. Brock, state senator from the 34th district
- Kay Daly
- Kathy Feather
- Chad A. Gant
- Hank Henning, Guilford County Commissioner
- Julia C. Howard, state representative
- Matthew J. McCall
- Vernon Robinson, former Winston-Salem city council-member, candidate for North Carolina's 5th congressional district in 2004, nominee for this seat in 2006 and candidate for North Carolina's 8th congressional district in 2012
- George Rouco, attorney and former CIA officer
- Farren K. Shoaf
- James Snyder Jr., attorney, former state representative, former Davidson County Republican Party chair, candidate for U.S. Senate in 2002 nominee for lieutenant governor in 2004 and candidate in 2008
- David W. Thompson, candidate for state representative in 2016
- Jason A. Walser
- Harry J. Warren, state representative

===== Withdrawn =====
- George Holding, incumbent U.S. Representative (running in the 2nd district)

==== Results ====
Republican primary results
Party	Candidate	Votes	%
Republican	Ted Budd	6,340	20.0
Republican	John Blust	3,308	10.4
Republican	Hank Henning	3,289	10.4
Republican	Julia Craven Howard	3,254	10.3
Republican	Matthew J. McCall	2,872	9.1
Republican	Andrew C. Brock	2,803	8.8
Republican	Jason A. Walser	2,319	7.3
Republican	Dan Barrett	2,296	7.2
Republican	Harry Warren	1,266	4.0
Republican	Vernon Robinson	970	3.1
Republican	Kay Daly	889	2.8
Republican	George Rouco	773	2.4
Republican	Jim Snyder	436	1.4
Republican	Farren K. Shoaf	404	1.3
Republican	Chad A. Gant	198	0.6
Republican	David W. Thompson	147	0.5
Republican	Kathy Feather	142	0.4
Total votes		31,706	100.0

=== Democratic primary ===
Ron Sanyal, who ran for this seat in 2014, and John P. McNeil, an attorney and U.S. Marine Corps veteran, were running for the seat under the old map. After the new map was adopted, they filed to run in the 2nd district instead. New candidates in the 13th included businessman Kevin Griffin, who had just lost the Democratic primary for U.S. Senate to Deborah Ross.

Bruce Davis, a veteran, small business owner, and former Guilford County Commissioner, won the Democratic nomination. Bob Isner, father of tennis star John Isner, came in a close second.

==== Candidates ====
===== Nominee =====
- Bruce Davis, former Guilford County Commissioner, candidate for the state senate in 2008, 2010 and 2012 and candidate for North Carolina's 6th congressional district in 2014

===== Eliminated in primary =====
- Adam Coker, small business owner and entrepreneur
- Mazie Ferguson, attorney
- Kevin D. Griffin, businessman
- Bob Isner, property developer, father of John Isner

===== Withdrawn =====
- John McNeil, attorney and U.S. Marine Corps veteran (running in the 2nd district)
- Ron Sanyal, candidate for North Carolina's 2nd congressional district in 2014 (running in the 2nd district)

==== Endorsements ====
Bob Isner

Individuals

- John Isner, professional tennis player

==== Results ====
Democratic primary results
Party	Candidate	Votes	%
Democratic	Bruce Davis	4,709	26.0
Democratic	Bob Isner	4,597	25.1
Democratic	Adam Coker	4,125	22.5
Democratic	Mazie Ferguson	2,963	16.2
Democratic	Kevin D. Griffin	1,946	10.6
Total votes		18,340	100.0

=== General election ===
==== Endorsements ====
Ted Budd (R)

Organizations

- Club for Growth
- NRA Political Victory Fund
Bruce Davis (D)

Labor unions

- AFL-CIO
- International Brotherhood of Boilermakers

Local officials

- Yvonne Johnson, Greensboro City Council member, and former Mayor of Greensboro

==== Predictions ====
Source	Ranking	As of
The Cook Political Report	Safe R	November 7, 2016
Daily Kos Elections	Safe R	November 7, 2016
Rothenberg	Safe R	November 3, 2016
Sabato's Crystal Ball	Safe R	November 7, 2016
RCP	Likely R	October 31, 2016

==== Results ====
North Carolina's 13th congressional district, 2016
Party	Candidate	Votes	%
Republican	Ted Budd	199,443	56.1
Democratic	Bruce Davis	156,049	43.9
Total votes		355,492	100.0
Republican hold			
