= 2016 United States Senate election in North Carolina =

- November 8, 2016
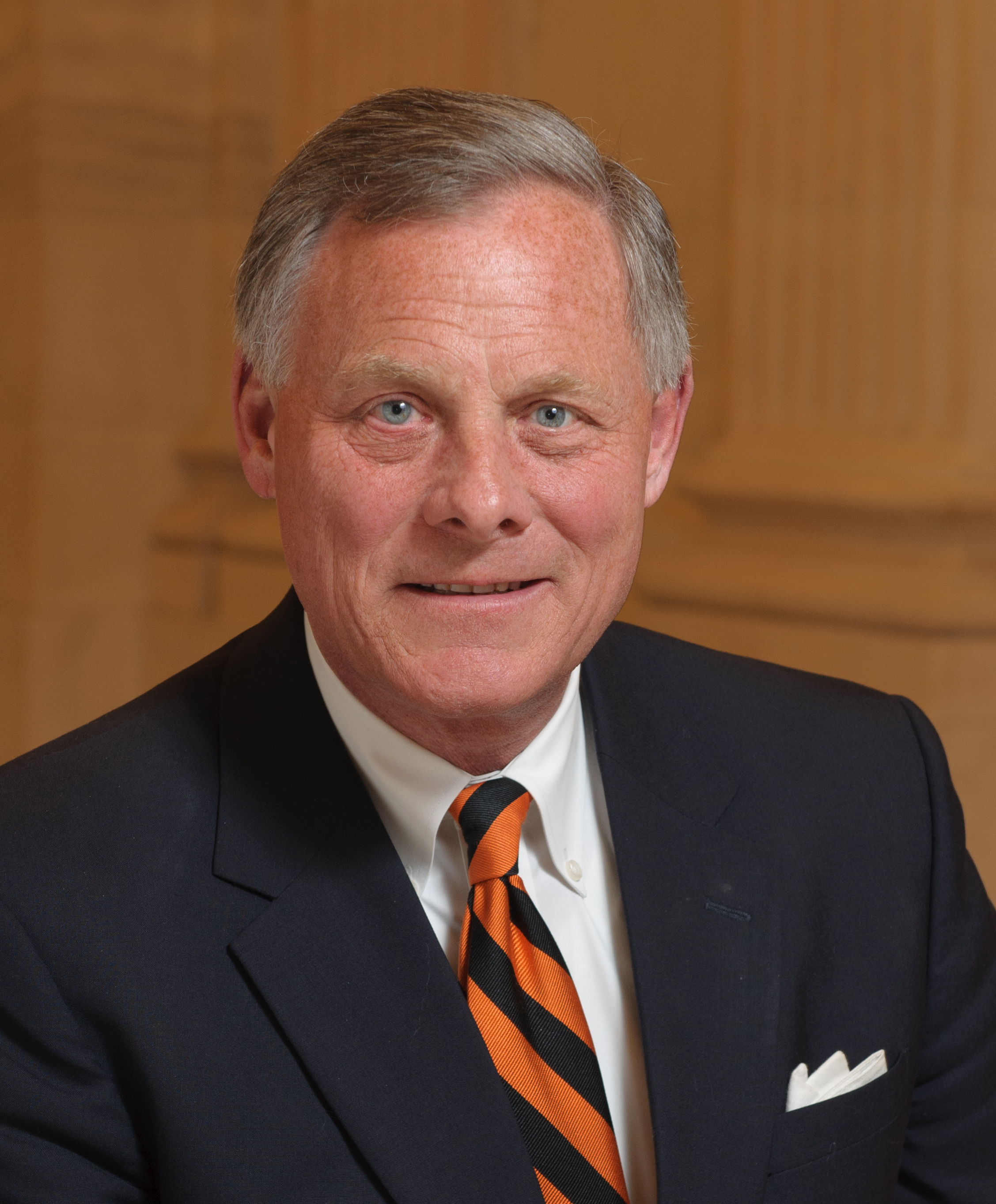

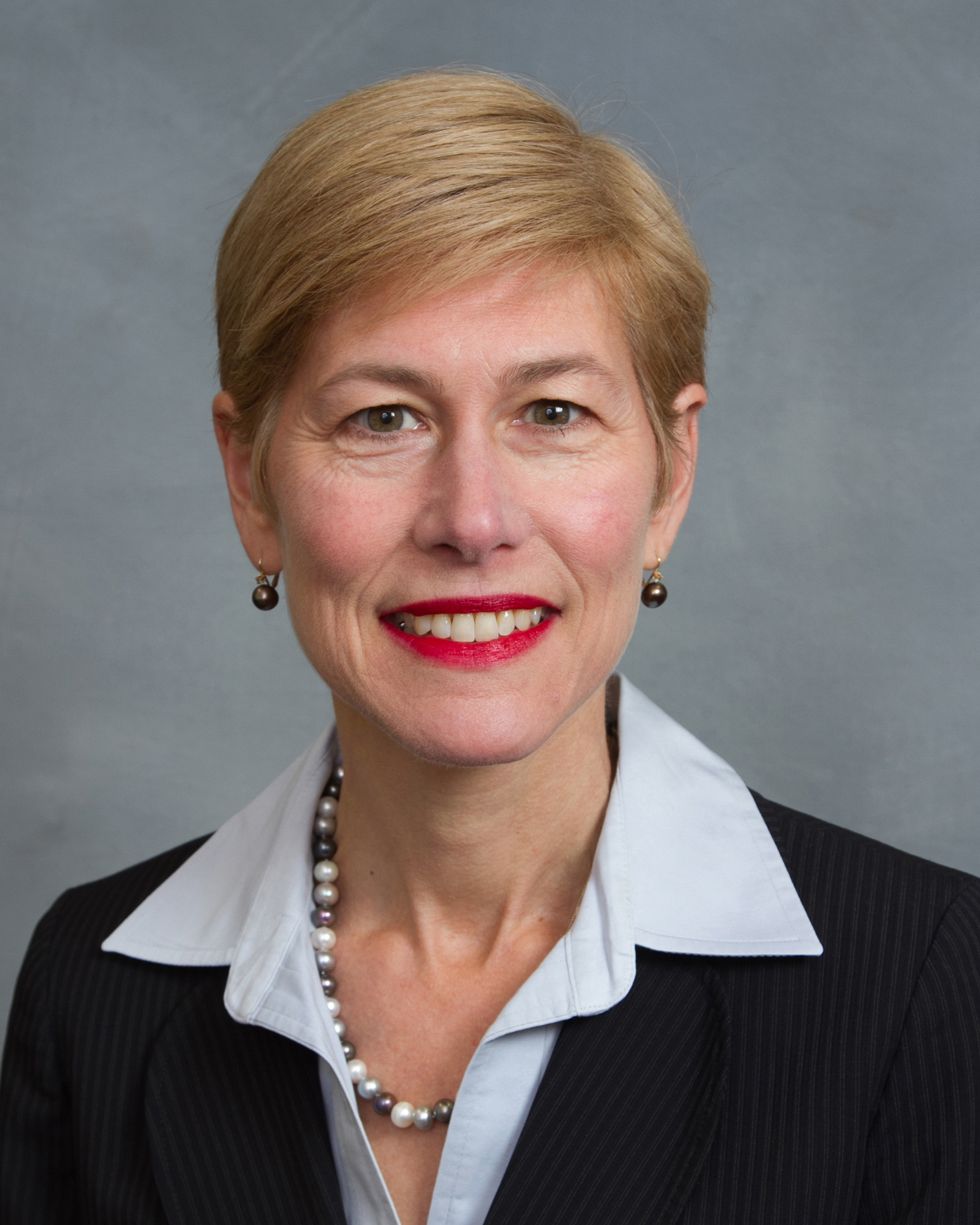
Nominee	Richard Burr	Deborah Ross
Party	Republican	Democratic
Popular vote	2,395,376	2,128,165
Percentage	51.06%	45.37%
- Burr: 40–50% 50–60% 60–70% 70–80% 80–90% >90% Ross: 40–50% 50–60% 60–70% 70–80% 80–90% >90% Tie: 40–50%
U.S. senator before election
Richard Burr
Republican
Elected U.S. Senator
Richard Burr
Republican

The 2016 United States Senate election in North Carolina was held on November 8, 2016, to elect a member of the United States Senate to represent the State of North Carolina, concurrently with the 2016 U.S. presidential election, elections to the United States Senate in other states, elections to the United States House of Representatives, and various state and local elections. Primary elections were held on March 15.

Incumbent Republican Senator Richard Burr won re-election to a third term in office against Democratic former state representative Deborah Ross and Libertarian Sean Haugh.

Burr said that this election would be his last.

== Republican primary ==
There had been speculation that Burr might retire, but he said in September 2014 that he was "planning" on running, and reaffirmed this in January 2015. If Burr had retired, the seat was expected to draw significant interest, with potential Republican candidates including U.S. representatives George Holding, Mark Meadows, and Robert Pittenger, Labor Commissioner Cherie Berry, Lieutenant Governor Dan Forest, Agriculture Commissioner Steve Troxler, State Senator Phil Berger, and former Ambassador to Denmark James P. Cain.

=== Candidates ===
==== Declared ====
- Greg Brannon, physician, Tea Party activist and candidate for the U.S. Senate in 2014
- Richard Burr, incumbent U.S. senator
- Larry Holmquist, businessman and Tea Party activist
- Paul Wright, former Superior Court judge, candidate for governor in 2012 and nominee for NC-04 in 2014

==== Declined ====
- Mark Meadows, U.S. representative (running for re-election)

=== Polling ===
Poll source	Date(s) administered	Sample size	Margin of error	Richard Burr	Greg Brannon	Paul Wright	Larry Holmquist	Undecided
Public Policy Polling	March 11–13, 2016	749	±3.6%	48%	20%	4%	3%	24%
High Point University	March 9–10, 2016	734	±2.5%	56%	20%	5%	3%	17%
SurveyUSA	March 4–7, 2016	688	±3.8%	45%	17%	7%	4%	27%
SurveyUSA	February 14–16, 2016	437	±2.8%	45%	14%	6%	6%	30%
Public Policy Polling	February 14–16, 2016	597	±4.0%	56%	13%	4%	3%	24%
High Point University	January 30 – February 4, 2016	477	±4.5%	46%	10%	5%	2%	37%
Public Policy Polling	January 18–19, 2016	433	±3.2%	55%	10%	6%	5%	24%

Hypothetical polling

Poll source	Date(s) administered	Sample size	Margin of error	Richard Burr	Mark Meadows	Undecided
Public Policy Polling	July 2–6, 2015	288	± 5.8%	62%	9%	28%

=== Results ===
Republican primary results
Party	Candidate	Votes	%
Republican	Richard Burr (incumbent)	622,074	61.41%
Republican	Greg Brannon	255,030	25.17%
Republican	Paul Wright	85,944	8.48%
Republican	Larry Holmquist	50,010	4.94%
Total votes		1,013,058	100.00%

== Democratic primary ==
=== Candidates ===
==== Declared ====
- Kevin Griffin, businessman
- Ernest Reeves, retired U.S. Army captain, candidate for the U.S. Senate in 2014 and candidate for mayor of Greenville in 2015
- Chris Rey, mayor of Spring Lake
- Deborah Ross, former state representative

==== Declined ====
- Dan Blue, minority leader of the North Carolina Senate and candidate for the U.S. Senate in 2002
- Roy Cooper, North Carolina attorney general (running for governor)
- Janet Cowell, North Carolina State Treasurer
- Cal Cunningham, former state senator and candidate for the U.S. Senate in 2010
- Joel Ford, state senator
- Anthony Foxx, United States secretary of transportation and former mayor of Charlotte
- Kay Hagan, former U.S. senator
- Duane Hall, state representative
- Larry Hall, minority leader of the North Carolina House of Representatives
- Jeff Jackson, state senator
- Allen Joines, mayor of Winston-Salem (running for re-election)
- Grier Martin, state representative
- Nancy McFarlane, Independent mayor of Raleigh
- Mike McIntyre, former U.S. representative
- Charles Meeker, former mayor of Raleigh (running for labor commissioner)
- Brad Miller, former U.S. representative
- Thomas W. Ross, outgoing president of the University of North Carolina system
- Heath Shuler, former U.S. representative
- Josh Stein, state senator (running for attorney general)
- Allen M. Thomas, mayor of Greenville
- Beth Wood, state auditor (running for re-election)

=== Polling ===
Poll source	Date(s) administered	Sample size	Margin of error	Kevin Griffin	Ernest Reeves	Chris Rey	Deborah Ross	Undecided
Public Policy Polling	March 11–13, 2016	746	±3.6%	4%	8%	8%	40%	41%
High Point University	March 9–10, 2016	669	±2.5%	9%	5%	7%	52%	27%
SurveyUSA	March 4–7, 2016	687	±3.8%	7%	6%	9%	34%	44%
SurveyUSA	February 14–16, 2016	449	±2.8%	7%	3%	5%	30%	55%
Public Policy Polling	February 14–16, 2016	575	±4.1%	10%	2%	10%	22%	55%
High Point University	January 30 – February 4, 2016	478	±4.5%	6%	4%	5%	19%	66%
Public Policy Polling	January 18–19, 2016	461	±3.2%	14%	3%	10%	19%	55%
Public Policy Polling	December 5–7, 2015	555	±2.8%	15%	-	5%	41%	39%
Public Policy Polling	October 23–25, 2015	421	±4.8%	16%	-	6%	33%	45%

=== Results ===
Democratic primary results
Party	Candidate	Votes	%
Democratic	Deborah Ross	614,414	62.32%
Democratic	Chris Rey	162,869	16.52%
Democratic	Kevin Griffin	115,618	11.73%
Democratic	Ernest Reeves	93,005	9.43%
Total votes		985,906	100.00%

== Libertarian primary ==
=== Candidates ===
==== Declared ====
- Sean Haugh, pizza delivery man and nominee for the U.S. Senate in 2002 and 2014

== General election ==
=== Candidates ===
- Richard Burr (R), incumbent U.S. senator
- Sean Haugh (L), pizza delivery man and nominee for the U.S. Senate in 2002 and 2014
- Deborah Ross (D), former state representative

=== Debates ===
Dates	Location	Burr	Ross	Link
October 13, 2016	Chapel Hill, North Carolina	Participant	Participant	

=== Endorsements ===
Richard Burr

U.S. presidents

- George W. Bush, 43rd president of the United States

U.S. senators

- John Cornyn, United States senator from Texas and Senate majority whip
- Ted Cruz, United States senator from Texas and 2016 presidential candidate

Individuals

- John Bolton, former United States ambassador to the United Nations

Organizations

- American Conservative Union
- National Rifle Association - Political Victory Fund

Newspapers

- The Daily Reflector
- Winston-Salem Journal
Deborah Ross

Presidents

- Barack Obama, 44th president of the United States

Vice presidents

- Joe Biden, 47th vice president of the United States

U.S. cabinet members and cabinet-level officials

- Hillary Clinton, 67th United States secretary of state, 2008 presidential candidate and 2016 presidential nominee

U.S. senators

- Barbara Boxer, California
- Sherrod Brown, Ohio
- Kirsten Gillibrand, New York
- Bernie Sanders, Vermont
- Elizabeth Warren, Massachusetts

Individuals

- Bob Edwards, mayor of Nags Head, North Carolina
- Larry Marciniak, former Franklin County, North Carolina Democratic Party chair

Labor unions

- AFL-CIO

Organizations

- Democratic Senatorial Campaign Committee
- EMILY's List
- Human Rights Campaign
- League of Conservation Voters
- National Committee to Preserve Social Security and Medicare
- Our Revolution
- Planned Parenthood
- Sierra Club
- U.S. Women's Chamber of Commerce

Newspapers

- The Charlotte Observer
- The Charlotte Post
- Indy Week
- The New York Times
- News & Record

=== Predictions ===
Source	Ranking	As of
The Cook Political Report	Tossup	November 2, 2016
Sabato's Crystal Ball	Lean R	November 7, 2016
Rothenberg Political Report	Tossup	November 3, 2016
Daily Kos	Tossup	November 8, 2016
Real Clear Politics	Tossup	November 7, 2016

=== Polling ===
Poll source	Date(s) administered	Sample size	Margin of error	Richard Burr (R)	Deborah Ross (D)	Sean Haugh (L)	Other	Undecided
SurveyMonkey	November 1–7, 2016	3,126	±4.6%	43%	47%	6%	–	4%
New York Times Upshot/Siena College	November 4–6, 2016	800	±3.5%	46%	45%	–	–	9%
Quinnipiac University	November 3–6, 2016	870	±3.3%	47%	47%	–	1%	4%
SurveyMonkey	October 31 – November 6, 2016	2,865	±4.6%	44%	47%	6%	–	3%
Breitbart/Gravis Marketing	November 1–4, 2016	1,250	±2.8%	47%	48%	–	–	5%
SurveyMonkey	October 28 – November 3, 2016	2,292	±4.6%	44%	47%	6%	–	3%
SurveyMonkey	October 27 – November 2, 2016	1,886	±4.6%	44%	47%	6%	–	3%
Public Policy Polling	October 31 – November 1, 2016	1,169	±2.9%	48%	45%	–	–	7%
Quinnipiac University	October 27 – November 1, 2016	602	±4.0%	45%	49%	–	1%	5%
SurveyMonkey	October 26 – November 1, 2016	1,617	±4.6%	43%	47%	6%	–	4%
SurveyUSA	October 28–31, 2016	659	±3.9%	49%	43%	2%	–	6%
SurveyMonkey	October 25–31, 2016	1,574	±4.6%	43%	47%	7%	–	3%
CBS News/YouGov	October 26–28, 2016	992	±4.1%	44%	44%	–	1%	10%
Emerson College	October 26–27, 2016	650	±3.8%	48%	44%	–	3%	6%
Elon University Poll	October 23–27, 2016	710	±3.7%	44%	40%	3%	–	11%
Breitbart/Gravis Marketing	October 25–26, 2016	1,273	±2.8%	45%	48%	–	–	7%
NBC/WSJ/Marist	October 25–26, 2016	780 LV	±3.5%	48%	48%	–	2%	3%
NBC/WSJ/Marist	October 25–26, 2016	1,018 RV	±3.1%	48%	46%	–	2%	4%
Quinnipiac University	October 20–26, 2016	702	±3.7%	48%	47%	–	–	5%
New York Times Upshot/Siena College	October 20–23, 2016	792	±3.5%	46%	47%	–	–	7%
Monmouth University	October 20–23, 2016	402	±4.9%	49%	43%	2%	–	5%
Public Policy Polling	October 21–22, 2016	875	±3.3%	42%	41%	6%	–	11%
The Times-Picayune/Lucid	October 17–18, 2016	924	±3.0%	46%	44%	–	–	10%
SurveyUSA	October 14–18, 2016	651	±3.9%	45%	43%	6%	–	6%
Civitas Institute (R)	October 14–17, 2016	600	±4.0%	44%	37%	4%	–	11%
Washington Post/SurveyMonkey	October 8–16, 2016	1,191	±0.5%	42%	48%	–	7%	3%
CNN/ORC	October 10–15, 2016	788 LV	±3.5%	48%	47%	–	–	2%
CNN/ORC	October 10–15, 2016	929 RV	±3.0%	46%	49%	–	1%	2%
NBC/WSJ/Marist	October 10–12, 2016	743 LV	±3.6%	46%	46%	–	2%	6%
NBC/WSJ/Marist	October 10–12, 2016	1,025 RV	±3.1%	45%	46%	–	2%	7%
Emerson College	October 10–12, 2016	600	±3.9%	45%	43%	–	3%	8%
Suffolk University	October 10–12, 2016	500	±4.4%	40%	36%	6%	–	16%
NCSU Pack Poll	October 3–6, 2016	895	±3.0%	39%	49%	12%	–	0%
High Point University	October 1–6, 2016	479	±4.5%	47%	42%	6%	–	4%
SurveyUSA	September 29 – October 3, 2016	656	±3.9%	46%	44%	3%	–	7%
Bloomberg/Selzer	September 29 – October 3, 2016	805	±3.5%	44%	46%	–	–	11%
Quinnipiac University	September 27 – October 2, 2016	507	±4.4%	46%	46%	–	–	7%
Elon University Poll	September 27–30, 2016	660	±3.8%	43%	44%	4%	–	8%
Public Policy Polling	September 27–28, 2016	861	±3.3%	41%	39%	6%	–	14%
Public Policy Polling	September 27–28, 2016	861	±3.3%	46%	42%	–	–	12%
Breitbart/Gravis Marketing	September 23, 2016	694	±3.7%	39%	48%	–	–	13%
Meredith College	September 18–22, 2016	487	±4.4%	35%	38%	1%	7%	19%
High Point University	September 17–22, 2016	404	±4.9%	45%	43%	4%	–	6%
FOX News	September 18–20, 2016	734 LV	±3.5%	43%	37%	6%	–	12%
FOX News	September 18–20, 2016	800 RV	±3.5%	42%	36%	7%	–	13%
Public Policy Polling	September 18–20, 2016	1,024	±3.1%	41%	41%	4%	–	15%
New York Times Upshot/Siena College	September 16–19, 2016	782	±3.6%	42%	46%	–	–	11%
Greenberg Quinlan Rosner - Democracy Corps	September 10–19, 2016	400	±4.0%	46%	30%	–	3%	21%
Elon University Poll	September 12–16, 2016	644	±3.9%	43%	44%	4%	–	9%
Civitas Institute (R)	September 11–12, 2016	600	±4.0%	44%	39%	2%	–	15%
Suffolk University	September 5–7, 2016	500	±4.4%	41%	37%	4%	–	16%
Quinnipiac University	August 29 – September 7, 2016	751	±3.6%	49%	43%	–	–	8%
CBS News/YouGov	August 30 – September 2, 2016	1,088	±4.0%	40%	41%	–	2%	17%
Emerson College	August 27–29, 2016	800	±3.4%	45%	41%	–	5%	14%
Public Policy Polling	August 26–27, 2016	1,177	±3.0%	46%	43%	–	–	12%
Monmouth University	August 20–23, 2016	401	±4.9%	45%	43%	4%	–	8%
CNN/ORC	August 18–23, 2016	803	±3.5%	50%	45%	–	–	5%
NBC/WSJ/Marist	August 4–10, 2016	921	±3.2%	44%	46%	–	1%	9%
Public Policy Polling	August 5–7, 2016	830	±3.4%	41%	37%	5%	–	17%
NBC/WSJ/Marist	July 5–11, 2016	907	±3.3%	48%	41%	–	1%	10%
Public Policy Polling	June 20–21, 2016	947	±3.2%	40%	37%	5%	–	18%
Greenberg Quinlan Rosner - Democracy Corps	June 11–20, 2016	300	±5.7%	36%	38%	–	–	26%
Public Policy Polling	May 20–22, 2016	928	±3.2%	39%	36%	8%	–	18%
Civitas Institute (R)	April 23–25, 2016	600	±4.0%	39%	38%	7%	–	16%
Public Policy Polling	April 22–24, 2016	960	±3.2%	40%	36%	7%	–	17%
Elon University Poll	April 10–15, 2016	621	±3.9%	37%	33%	–	–	30%
Public Policy Polling	March 18–20, 2016	843	±3.4%	40%	35%	7%	–	18%
High Point University	March 9–10, 2016	1,576	±2.5%	48%	41%	–	–	11%
SurveyUSA	February 14–16, 2016	1,250	±2.8%	45%	37%	–	–	18%
Public Policy Polling	February 14–16, 2016	1,291	±2.7%	43%	37%	–	–	20%
Public Policy Polling	January 18–19, 2016	948	±3.2%	43%	33%	–	–	23%
Public Policy Polling	December 5–7, 2015	1,214	±2.8%	46%	35%	–	–	19%
Public Policy Polling	October 23–25, 2015	893	±3.3%	43%	39%	–	–	18%
Public Policy Polling	September 24–27, 2015	1,268	±2.8%	45%	34%	–	–	21%
Public Policy Polling	August 12–16, 2015	957	±3.2%	43%	36%	–	–	21%

Hypothetical polling

With Burr

Poll source	Date(s) administered	Sample size	Margin of error	Richard Burr (R)	Kevin Griffin (D)	Undecided
SurveyUSA	February 14–16, 2016	1,250	±2.8%	45%	35%	20%
Public Policy Polling	February 14–16, 2016	1,291	±2.7%	43%	36%	21%
Public Policy Polling	January 18–19, 2016	948	±3.2%	42%	35%	24%
Public Policy Polling	December 5–7, 2015	1,214	± 2.8%	46%	35%	19%
Public Policy Polling	October 23–25, 2015	893	± 3.3%	44%	35%	21%

Poll source	Date(s) administered	Sample size	Margin of error	Richard Burr (R)	Chris Rey (D)	Undecided
SurveyUSA	February 14–16, 2016	1,250	±2.8%	46%	34%	20%
Public Policy Polling	February 14–16, 2016	1,291	±2.7%	43%	36%	21%
Public Policy Polling	January 18–19, 2016	948	±3.2%	44%	32%	24%
Public Policy Polling	December 5–7, 2015	1,214	± 2.8%	47%	33%	21%
Public Policy Polling	October 23–25, 2015	893	± 3.3%	45%	34%	21%
Public Policy Polling	September 24–27, 2015	1,268	± 2.8%	46%	34%	20%
Public Policy Polling	August 12–16, 2015	957	± 3.2%	44%	37%	20%

Poll source	Date(s) administered	Sample size	Margin of error	Richard Burr (R)	Dan Blue (D)	Undecided
Public Policy Polling	July 2–6, 2015	529	± 4.1%	45%	35%	19%
Public Policy Polling	May 28–31, 2015	561	± 4.1%	48%	34%	18%
Public Policy Polling	April 2–5, 2015	751	± 3.6%	47%	36%	17%

Poll source	Date(s) administered	Sample size	Margin of error	Richard Burr (R)	Roy Cooper (D)	Undecided
Meeting Street Research	January 21–22, 2015	500	± 4.38%	44%	41%	15%

Poll source	Date(s) administered	Sample size	Margin of error	Richard Burr (R)	Janet Cowell (D)	Undecided
Public Policy Polling	April 2–5, 2015	751	± 3.6%	46%	35%	19%
Public Policy Polling	February 24–26, 2015	849	± 3.4%	44%	38%	18%
Public Policy Polling	January 29–31, 2015	845	± 3.4%	45%	38%	18%
Public Policy Polling	December 4–7, 2014	823	± 3.4%	44%	38%	17%
Public Policy Polling	August 14–17, 2014	856	± 3.4%	44%	37%	19%

Poll source	Date(s) administered	Sample size	Margin of error	Richard Burr (R)	Anthony Foxx (D)	Undecided
Public Policy Polling	February 24–26, 2015	849	± 3.4%	45%	36%	20%
Public Policy Polling	January 29–31, 2015	845	± 3.4%	47%	36%	17%
Public Policy Polling	December 4–7, 2014	823	± 3.4%	44%	38%	18%
Public Policy Polling	August 14–17, 2014	856	± 3.4%	45%	35%	19%

Poll source	Date(s) administered	Sample size	Margin of error	Richard Burr (R)	Kay Hagan (D)	Other	Undecided
Public Policy Polling	May 28–31, 2015	561	± 4.1%	49%	40%	—	11%
Elon University Poll	April 20–24, 2015	677	± 3.77%	44%	43%	4%	8%
Public Policy Polling	April 2–5, 2015	751	± 3.6%	50%	38%	—	12%
Public Policy Polling	February 24–26, 2015	849	± 3.4%	50%	43%	—	7%
Meeting Street Research	January 21–22, 2015	500	± 4.38%	49%	45%	—	6%
Public Policy Polling	January 29–31, 2015	845	± 3.4%	48%	42%	—	10%
Public Policy Polling	December 4–7, 2014	823	± 3.4%	46%	43%	—	11%

Poll source	Date(s) administered	Sample size	Margin of error	Richard Burr (R)	Duane Hall (D)	Undecided
Public Policy Polling	September 24–27, 2015	1,268	± 2.8%	45%	35%	19%
Public Policy Polling	Aug 12–16, 2015	957	± 3.2%	44%	36%	21%

Poll source	Date(s) administered	Sample size	Margin of error	Richard Burr (R)	Jeff Jackson (D)	Undecided
Public Policy Polling	May 28–31, 2015	561	± 4.1%	48%	30%	22%
Public Policy Polling	April 2–5, 2015	751	± 3.6%	46%	30%	24%

Poll source	Date(s) administered	Sample size	Margin of error	Richard Burr (R)	Allen Joines (D)	Undecided
Public Policy Polling	February 24–26, 2015	849	± 3.4%	45%	33%	23%
Public Policy Polling	August 14–17, 2014	856	± 3.4%	45%	32%	23%

Poll source	Date(s) administered	Sample size	Margin of error	Richard Burr (R)	Grier Martin (D)	Undecided
Public Policy Polling	July 2–6, 2015	529	± 4.1%	47%	33%	20%
Public Policy Polling	May 28–31, 2015	561	± 4.1%	46%	31%	23%
Public Policy Polling	April 2–5, 2015	751	± 3.6%	46%	32%	23%
Public Policy Polling	August 14–17, 2014	856	± 3.4%	45%	33%	22%

Poll source	Date(s) administered	Sample size	Margin of error	Richard Burr (R)	Mike McIntyre (D)	Undecided
Public Policy Polling	July 2–6, 2015	529	± 4.1%	44%	35%	21%
Public Policy Polling	May 28–31, 2015	561	± 4.1%	43%	34%	22%
Public Policy Polling	January 29–31, 2015	845	± 3.4%	44%	37%	19%

Poll source	Date(s) administered	Sample size	Margin of error	Richard Burr (R)	Brad Miller (D)	Undecided
Public Policy Polling	July 2–6, 2015	529	± 4.1%	46%	36%	18%
Public Policy Polling	April 2–5, 2015	751	± 3.6%	45%	34%	20%

Poll source	Date(s) administered	Sample size	Margin of error	Richard Burr (R)	Tom Ross (D)	Undecided
Public Policy Polling	January 29–31, 2015	845	± 3.4%	44%	35%	21%

Poll source	Date(s) administered	Sample size	Margin of error	Richard Burr (R)	Heath Shuler (D)	Undecided
Public Policy Polling	September 24–27, 2015	1,268	± 2.8%	42%	37%	20%
Public Policy Polling	Aug 12–16, 2015	957	± 3.2%	42%	35%	22%
Public Policy Polling	July 2–6, 2015	529	± 4.1%	44%	36%	20%

Poll source	Date(s) administered	Sample size	Margin of error	Richard Burr (R)	Beth Wood (D)	Undecided
Public Policy Polling	July 2–6, 2015	529	± 4.1%	45%	34%	21%

With Berger

Poll source	Date(s) administered	Sample size	Margin of error	Phil Berger (R)	Janet Cowell (D)	Undecided
Public Policy Polling	December 4–7, 2014	823	± 3.4%	41%	38%	21%

Poll source	Date(s) administered	Sample size	Margin of error	Phil Berger (R)	Anthony Foxx (D)	Undecided
Public Policy Polling	December 4–7, 2014	823	± 3.4%	40%	37%	24%

Poll source	Date(s) administered	Sample size	Margin of error	Phil Berger (R)	Kay Hagan (D)	Undecided
Public Policy Polling	December 4–7, 2014	823	± 3.4%	45%	43%	13%

=== Results ===
2016 United States Senate election in North Carolina
Party	Candidate	Votes	%	±%
Republican	Richard Burr (incumbent)	2,395,376	51.06%	−3.75%
Democratic	Deborah Ross	2,128,165	45.37%	+2.32%
Libertarian	Sean Haugh	167,592	3.57%	+1.48%
Total votes		4,691,133	100.00%	N/A
Republican hold				

==== Counties that flipped from Democratic to Republican ====
- Bladen (largest town: Elizabethtown)
- Martin (largest town: Williamston)
- Richmond (largest city: Rockingham)
- Robeson (largest city: Lumberton)

==== Counties that flipped from Republican to Democratic ====
- Guilford (largest municipality: Greensboro)
- Forsyth (largest town: Winston-Salem)
- Pitt (largest town: Greenville)
- Wake (largest town: Raleigh)

== See also ==
- 2016 United States Senate elections
