= Greg Brannon =

American political activist (1960–2025)

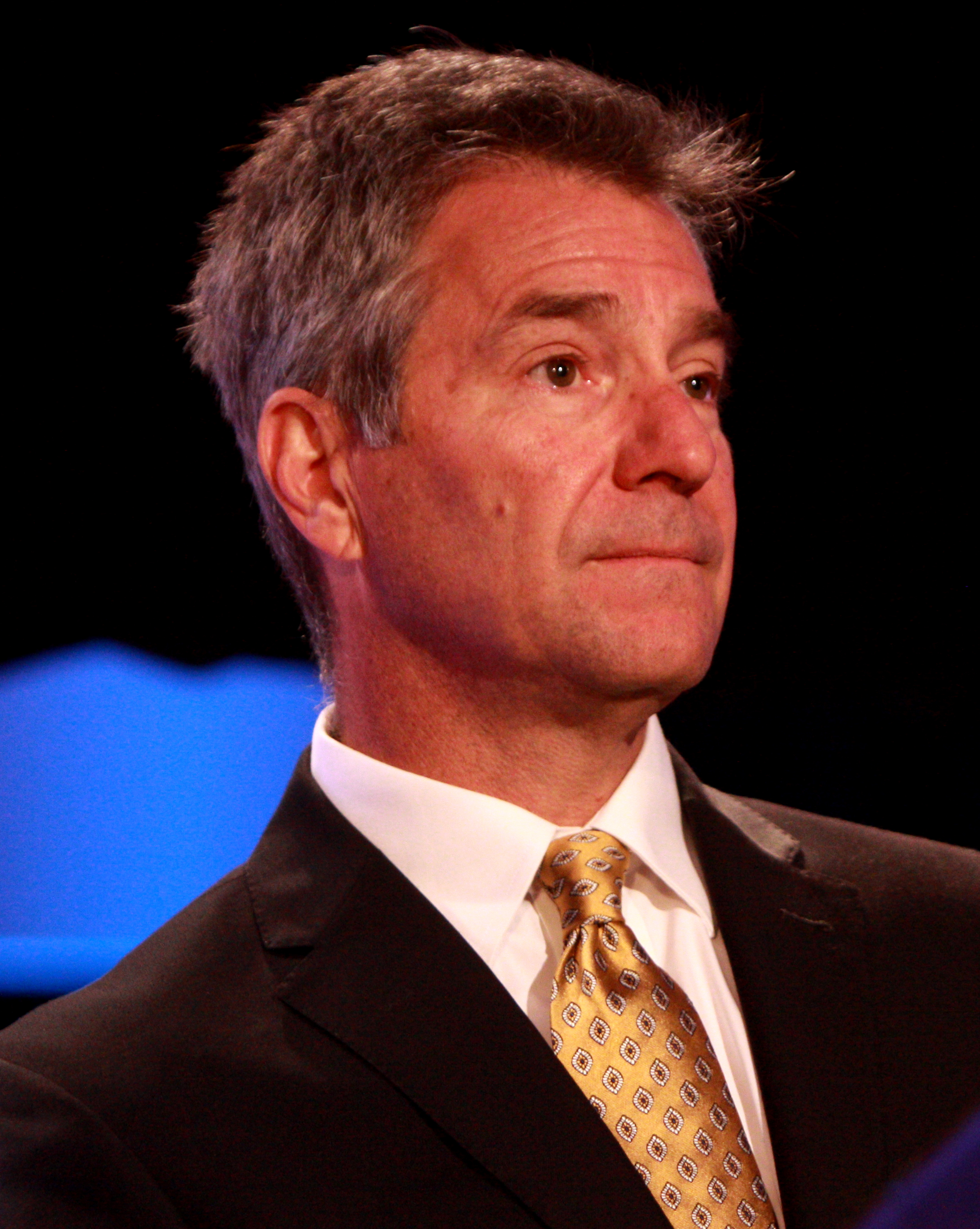

Personal details
- Born: August 17, 1960 Inglewood, California, U.S.
- Died: July 27, 2025 (aged 64)
- Party: Republican
- Spouse: Jody Brannon (m. 1988)
- Children: 7
- Education: University of Southern California (B.S.); Chicago Medical School (M.D.)
- Profession: Physician (ret.); Medical director

Gregory J. Brannon (August 17, 1960 – July 27, 2025) was an American physician, specializing in obstetrics and gynecology, and political activist. A native of Los Angeles, California, Brannon was a graduate of the University of Southern California and Chicago Medical School. After completing his residency, Brannon established a private obstetrics practice in Cary, North Carolina.

An ally of the Tea Party movement, Brannon unsuccessfully sought the Republican nomination for U.S. Senate in the 2014 and the 2016 elections. He came in second place both times, losing the 2014 race to Thom Tillis and the 2016 race to Richard Burr.

== Early life and education ==
Brannon was born in Inglewood, California, on August 17, 1960. Brannon was raised by a single mother in the suburbs of Los Angeles.

Brannon received his bachelor's degree from the University of Southern California in 1982, his medical degree from Chicago Medical School in 1988, and completed his residency at University of Southern California Women's Hospital, Los Angeles, in 1992.

== Medical and business career ==
After completing his residency, Brannon served as assistant professor of obstetrics and gynecology at University of North Carolina School of Medicine, with work at Wake Area Health Education Center. He was an ob-gyn in Cary, North Carolina, having entered private practice in 1993. He retired from the practice in 2020, moving on to serve as the medical director for a company in the southeastern US specializing in hormone replacement therapy.

In a February 2014 civil trial, a jury determined that Brannon made false and misleading statements to potential investors of a technology company, which later went out of business. Brannon, who was a board member of the company, Neogence Enterprises, and was ordered to pay $250,000 to the investors, plus $132,000 in attorney fees and court costs. The jury verdict damaged Brannon's 2014 primary campaign for the U.S. Senate. The civil judgment against Brannon was upheld by the North Carolina Court of Appeals in 2016 and by the North Carolina Supreme Court in 2019.

== Political activism ==
A staunch critic of President Barack Obama, Brannon was an early leader in the Tea Party movement in North Carolina. He was strongly anti-abortion. He opposed the Affordable Care Act, asserting that the law "attacks the fabric" of constitutional rights, and favors a largely unregulated health care market. He supported a return to the gold standard and a phase-out of Social Security.

In 2012, Brannon urged a vote for a third-party president candidate over Republican nominee Mitt Romney, asserting that "Casting a vote for either Obama or Romney will advance tyranny since both candidates are committed statists who despise the Constitution." Brannon's comments garnered scrutiny in his 2014 Republican primary campaign. During his 2016 primary campaign, Brannon said he would work to abolish the Internal Revenue Service (IRS), asserting that the agency was unconstitutional; during his campaign, Brannon acknowledged that he owed $175,000 in tax debt to the agency.

=== 2014 U.S. Senate campaign ===
In 2013, Brannon announced that he would seek the Republican nomination for U.S. Senate to challenge incumbent Kay Hagan. He won the endorsements of FreedomWorks, U.S. Senators Mike Lee and Rand Paul, and RedState's Erick Erickson.

Brannon lost the primary to Thom Tillis, the speaker of the state House. Tillis received about 46% of the vote, Brannon about 27%, and Baptist pastor Mark Harris about 17.5%.

=== 2016 U.S. Senate campaign ===
In December 2015, Brannon announced he would again run for the U.S. Senate in the 2016 election, challenging incumbent U.S. Senator Richard Burr in the Republican primary. He lost to Burr in the 2016 Republican primary. Burr received about 61% of the vote, while Brannon received about 25%.

Brannon later launched a weekly conservative talk radio show.

== Personal life and death ==
Brannon and his wife, Jody, had seven children, three of whom are adopted. As a young adult, he became an evangelical Christian.

Brannon died at his home on July 27, 2025, at the age of 64.
