= 2014 United States Senate election in North Carolina =

- November 4, 2014
- Turnout: 2,915,281
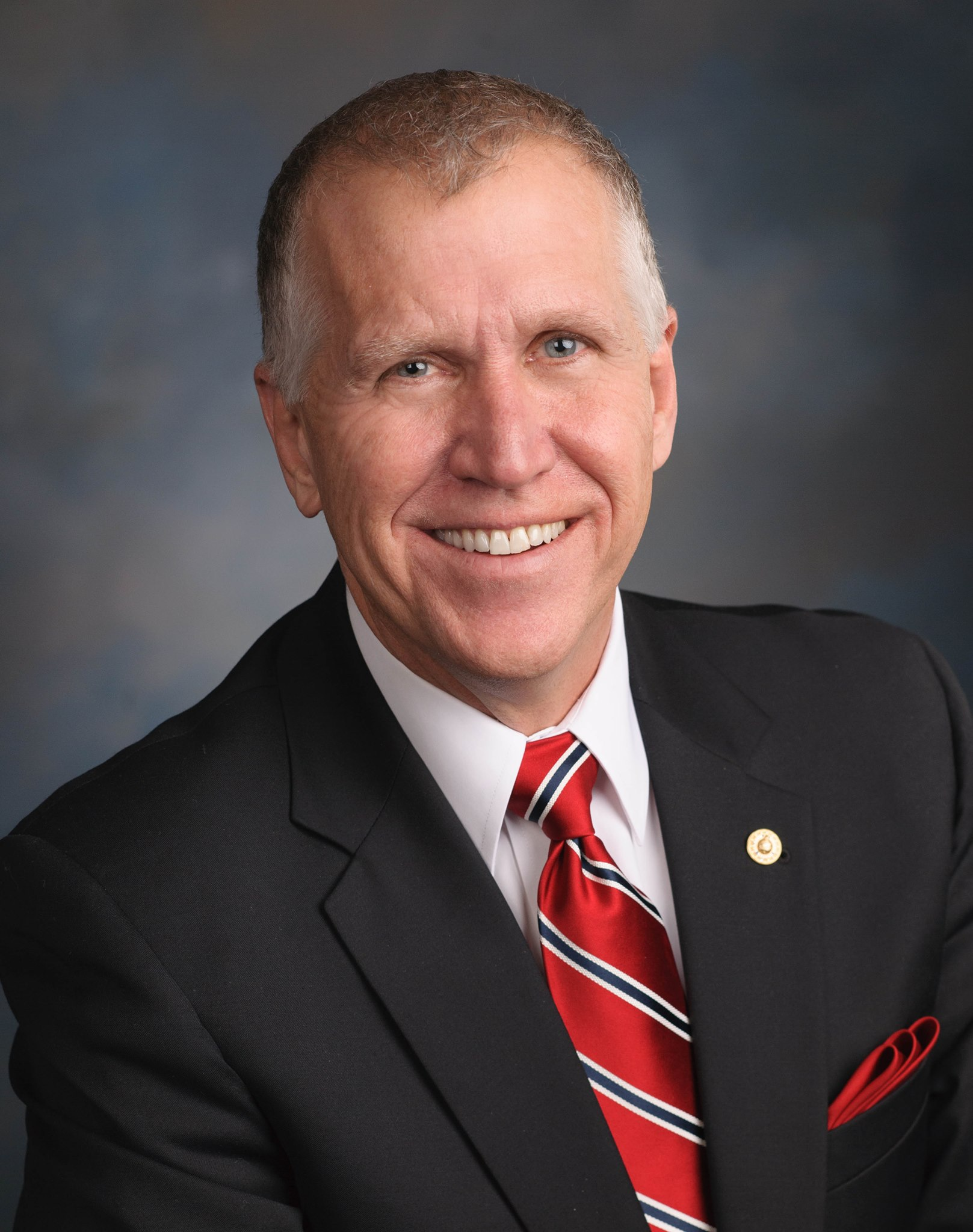

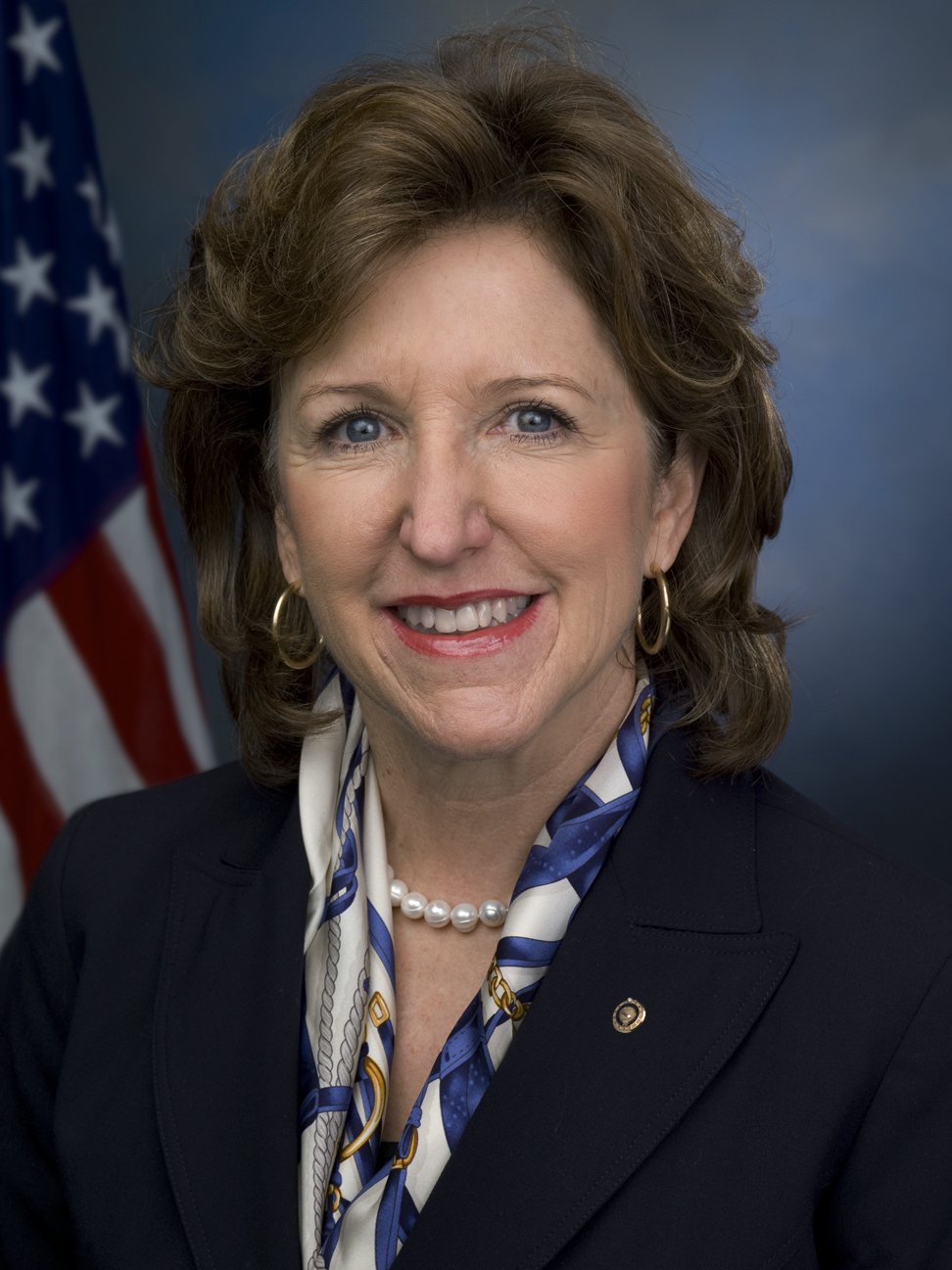
Nominee	Thom Tillis	Kay Hagan
Party	Republican	Democratic
Popular vote	1,423,259	1,377,651
Percentage	48.82%	47.26%
- Tillis: 40–50% 50–60% 60–70% 70–80% 80–90% Hagan: 40–50% 50–60% 60–70% 70–80% 80–90% >90% Tie: No votes
U.S. senator before election
Kay Hagan
Democratic
Elected U.S. Senator
Thom Tillis
Republican

The 2014 United States Senate election in North Carolina was held on November 4, 2014, to elect a member of the United States Senate to represent the state of North Carolina. Primary elections took place on May 6.

This was one of the seven Democratic-held Senate seats up for election in a state that Mitt Romney won in the 2012 presidential election.

Incumbent Democratic senator Kay Hagan ran for re-election to a second term in office, but was defeated by Republican Thom Tillis, Speaker of the North Carolina House of Representatives by about 45,000 votes and a margin of 1.6%. This made the election the second-closest race of the 2014 Senate election cycle, behind only the election in Virginia.

== Democratic primary ==
=== Candidates ===
==== Nominee ====
- Kay Hagan, incumbent U.S. senator

==== Eliminated in primary ====
- Ernest T. Reeves retired U.S. Army captain
- Will Stewart, small business owner

==== Withdrew ====
- Fred Westphal, retired University of Miami professor and political activist

=== Results ===
Democratic primary election results
Party	Candidate	Votes	%
Democratic	Kay Hagan (incumbent)	372,209	77.16%
Democratic	Will Stewart	66,903	13.87%
Democratic	Ernest T. Reeves	43,257	8.97%
Total votes		482,369	100.00%

== Republican primary ==
=== Candidates ===
The eight Republican candidates on the 2014 U.S. Senate primary ballot were the most in party history in North Carolina, more than the seven on the ballot in the 2002 Republican primary won by Elizabeth Dole.

==== Nominee ====
- Thom Tillis, speaker of the North Carolina House of Representatives

==== Eliminated in primary ====
- Ted Alexander, former mayor of Shelby
- Alex Bradshaw
- Greg Brannon, physician and Tea Party activist
- Heather Grant, nurse practitioner
- Mark Harris, pastor of First Baptist Church of Charlotte and president of the Baptist State Convention of North Carolina
- Edward Kryn, retired physician
- James Snyder Jr., former state representative, candidate for U.S. Senate in 2002 and nominee for lieutenant governor in 2004

==== Withdrew ====
- Terry Embler, police detective
- Bill Flynn, radio host and candidate for North Carolina's 6th congressional district in 2012

==== Declined ====
- Phil Berger, President pro tempore of the North Carolina Senate
- Cherie K. Berry, North Carolina Commissioner of Labor
- Peter S. Brunstetter, state senator
- James P. Cain, attorney and former United States Ambassador to Denmark
- Renee Ellmers, U.S. representative
- Dan Forest, Lieutenant Governor of North Carolina
- Virginia Foxx, U.S. representative
- George Holding, U.S. representative
- Patrick McHenry, U.S. representative
- Sue Myrick, former U.S. representative and former Mayor of Charlotte
- Robert Pittenger, U.S. representative
- Kieran Shanahan, attorney
- Lynn Wheeler, former member of the Charlotte City Council and former mayor pro tempore of Charlotte

=== Endorsements ===
Greg Brannon

Politicians

- Terry Embler, police detective and withdrawn candidate for the U.S. Senate
- Mike Lee, U.S. senator (R-UT)
- Thomas Massie, U.S. representative (R-KY)
- Rand Paul, U.S. senator (R-KY)
- Ron Paul, former U.S. representative (R-TX)

Political figures

- Ann Coulter, author and conservative political commentator
- Erick Erickson, conservative pundit and editor-in-chief of RedState
- Mark Levin, author and conservative radio host

Organizations

- FreedomWorks
- Gun Owners of America
- National Association for Gun Rights
Mark Harris
- Peter S. Brunstetter, former state senator
- Warren T. Daniel, state senator
- Robin Hayes, former U.S. representative and former chairman of the North Carolina Republican Party
- Mike Huckabee, former governor of Arkansas
- Buck Newton, state senator
- Dan Soucek, state senator
Jim Snyder
- Greensboro News & Record
Thom Tillis

Organizations

- American Crossroads
- U.S. Chamber of Commerce

Politicians

- Jeb Bush, former governor of Florida
- Pat McCrory, Governor of North Carolina
- Mitt Romney, former governor of Massachusetts and 2012 presidential nominee

State legislators

- Harry Brown, state senator
- David Curtis, state senator
- Jim Davis, state senator
- Thom Goolsby, state senator
- Rick Gunn, state senator
- Fletcher L. Hartsell, Jr., state senator
- Brent Jackson, state senator
- Wesley Meredith, state senator
- Bill Rabon, state senator
- Ron Rabin, state senator
- Bob Rucho, state senator
- Jeff Tarte, state senator
- Tommy Tucker, state senator
- Trudy Wade, state senator
- Dean Arp, state representative
- Marilyn Avila, state representative
- John Bell, state representative
- Jamie Boles, state representative
- Bill Brawley, state representative
- Brian Brown, state representative
- Rayne Brown, state representative
- Rob Bryan, state representative
- Dana Bumgardner, state representative
- Justin Burr, state representative
- Rick Catlin, state representative
- Jeff Collins, state representative
- N. Leo Daughtry, state representative
- Ted Davis, state representative
- Jimmy Dixon, state representative
- Josh Dobson, state representative
- Nelson Dollar, state representative
- John Faircloth, state representative
- Jim Fulghum, state representative
- Mike Hager, state representative
- Jon Hardister, state representative
- Mark Hollo, state representative
- Craig Horn, state representative
- Julia C. Howard, state representative
- Pat Hurley, state representative
- Frank Iler, state representative
- Charlie Jeter, state representative
- Linda P. Johnson, state representative
- Donny Lambeth, state representative
- J. H. Langdon, state representative
- Chris Malone, state representative
- Susan Martin, state representative
- Pat McElraft, state representative
- Chuck McGrady, state representative
- Allen McNeill, state representative
- Tim Moffitt, state representative
- Tim Moore, state representative
- Tom Murry, state representative
- Michele Presnell, state representative
- Nathan Ramsey, state representative
- Steve Ross, state representative
- Jason Saine, state representative
- Ruth Samuelson, state representative
- Jacqueline Schaffer, state representative
- Mitchell S. Setzer, state representative
- Phil Shepard, state representative
- Paul Stam, state representative
- Sarah Stevens, state representative
- Mike C. Stone, state representative
- John Szoka, state representative
- John Torbett, state representative
- Rena Turner, state representative
- Roger West, state representative
- Roger Younts, state representative

=== Polling ===
Primary

Poll source	Date(s) administered	Sample size	Margin of error	Ted Alexander	Alex Bradshaw	Greg Brannon	Heather Grant	Mark Harris	Edward Kryn	Jim Snyder	Thom Tillis	Other/ Undecided
Public Policy Polling	February 6–9, 2014	305	± 5.6%	10%	—	13%	13%	8%	2%	—	20%	34%
American Insights	February 11–15, 2014	168	± 7.6%	—	—	4%	4%	7%	—	—	11%	74%
Public Policy Polling	March 6–9, 2014	392	± 5%	7%	6%	14%	11%	7%	1%	4%	14%	36%
SurveyUSA	March 17–19, 2014	405	± 5%	7%	4%	15%	11%	6%	3%	4%	28%	23%
SurveyUSA	March 19–23, 2014	405	± 5%	1%	2%	13%	5%	9%	0%	5%	27%	38%
SurveyUSA	March 27–31, 2014	433	± 4.8%	6%	1%	15%	6%	11%	2%	3%	23%	34%
Public Policy Polling	April 3–6, 2014	314	± 5.5%	6%	5%	15%	7%	11%	1%	2%	18%	34%
SurveyUSA	April 16–22, 2014	392	± 5%	1%	1%	20%	2%	15%	2%	2%	39%	19%
Public Policy Polling	April 26–28, 2014	694	± 3.7%	2%	1%	20%	5%	11%	2%	3%	46%	12%
Public Policy Polling	May 3–4, 2014	925	± 3.2%	2%	0%	28%	4%	15%	1%	1%	40%	11%

Poll source	Date(s) administered	Sample size	Margin of error	Phil Berger	Greg Brannon	Jim Cain	Renee Ellmers	Bill Flynn	Virginia Foxx	Heather Grant	Mark Harris	Thom Tillis	Lynn Wheeler	Other/ Undecided
Public Policy Polling	June 12–14, 2013	374	± 5.1%	11%	7%	8%	9%	—	23%	—	4%	9%	3%	27%
Public Policy Polling	July 12–14, 2013	373	± 5.1%	11%	7%	11%	11%	—	16%	—	1%	5%	3%	35%
Public Policy Polling	July 12–14, 2013	373	± 5.1%	22%	—	—	18%	—	—	—	—	21%	—	39%
Public Policy Polling	July 12–14, 2013	373	± 5.1%	—	—	—	25%	—	—	—	—	32%	—	43%
Public Policy Polling	August 8–11, 2013	344	± 5.3%	9%	7%	9%	—	—	18%	4%	4%	8%	2%	40%
Public Policy Polling	August 8–11, 2013	344	± 5.3%	22%	—	—	—	—	—	—	—	23%	—	56%
Public Policy Polling	September 6–9, 2013	311	± 5.6%	13%	6%	11%	—	—	—	8%	5%	12%	2%	43%
Public Policy Polling	November 8–11, 2013	498	± 4.4%	—	11%	—	—	—	—	8%	14%	20%	—	47%
Public Policy Polling	December 5–8, 2013	529	± 4.3%	—	11%	—	—	8%	—	11%	12%	13%	—	44%
Public Policy Polling	January 9–12, 2014	575	± 4.1%	—	11%	—	—	7%	—	11%	8%	19%	—	44%

Poll source	Date(s) administered	Sample size	Margin of error	Phil Berger	Cherie Berry	Greg Brannon	Renee Ellmers	Terry Embler	Dan Forest	Virginia Foxx	George Holding	Patrick McHenry	Thom Tillis	Other/ Undecided
Public Policy Polling	February 7–10, 2013	518	± 4.3%	7%	18%	5%	10%	1%	—	18%	3%	10%	3%	27%
Public Policy Polling	March 7–10, 2013	530	± 4.3%	8%	12%	4%	10%	1%	18%	13%	—	7%	2%	24%
Public Policy Polling	April 11–14, 2013	468	± 4.5%	11%	18%	6%	12%	1%	—	13%	—	—	7%	32%
Public Policy Polling	May 17–20, 2013	366	± 5.1%	10%	14%	7%	10%	—	—	15%	—	—	6%	38%

Poll source	Date(s) administered	Sample size	Margin of error	Phil Berger	Renee Ellmers	Virginia Foxx	George Holding	Richard Hudson	Patrick McHenry	Mark Meadows	Sue Myrick	Robert Pittenger	Thom Tillis	Other/ Undecided
Public Policy Polling	December 6–9, 2012	462	± 4.6%	—	11%	17%	9%	6%	13%	4%	14%	—	2%	25%
Public Policy Polling	January 10–13, 2013	449	± 4.6%	5%	11%	21%	2%	5%	15%	—	—	6%	2%	33%

Runoff

Hypothetical runoff polling

Poll source	Date(s) administered	Sample size	Margin of error	Greg Brannon	Thom Tillis	Undecided
Public Policy Polling	April 26–28, 2014	694	± 3.7%	32%	50%	18%
Public Policy Polling	May 3–4, 2014	925	± 3.2%	40%	46%	14%

Poll source	Date(s) administered	Sample size	Margin of error	Mark Harris	Thom Tillis	Undecided
Public Policy Polling	April 26–28, 2014	694	± 3.7%	27%	53%	20%
Public Policy Polling	May 3–4, 2014	925	± 3.2%	34%	49%	16%

=== Results ===
Results by county: Tillis: 30–40%; 40–50%; 50–60%; 60–70%; Brannon: 30–40%; 40–50%; Harris: 30–40%

Republican primary election results
Party	Candidate	Votes	%
Republican	Thom Tillis	223,174	45.68%
Republican	Greg Brannon	132,630	27.15%
Republican	Mark Harris	85,727	17.55%
Republican	Heather Grant	22,971	4.70%
Republican	Jim Snyder	9,414	1.93%
Republican	Ted Alexander	9,258	1.89%
Republican	Alex Lee Bradshaw	3,528	0.72%
Republican	Edward Kryn	1,853	0.38%
Total votes		488,555	100.00%

== Libertarian primary ==
=== Candidates ===
==== Declared ====
- Tim D'Annunzio, businessman, Republican candidate for NC-08 in 2010 and Republican nominee for NC-04 in 2012
- Sean Haugh, pizza delivery man and nominee for this seat in 2002

=== Results ===
Libertarian primary election results
Party	Candidate	Votes	%
Libertarian	Sean Haugh	1,226	60.69%
Libertarian	Tim D'Annunzio	794	39.31%
Total votes		2,020	100.00%

== Other parties ==
=== Certified write-in candidates ===
- Barry Gurney, small business owner
- John W. Rhodes, former Republican state representative
- David Waddell, Constitution Party member and former Indian Trail town councilman

== General election ==
=== Candidates ===
- Kay Hagan (D), incumbent U.S. senator
- Sean Haugh (L), pizza delivery man and nominee for the U.S. Senate in 2002
- Thom Tillis (R), Speaker of the North Carolina House of Representatives

=== Outside spending ===
In July 2014, Jim Morrill of The Charlotte Observer calculated that as of the end of June, more than $26 million had been spent by outside advocacy groups on the election, with $17 million of it attacking Hagan or supporting Tillis and less than $9 million supporting Hagan or attacking Tillis. By contrast, outside groups spent $25 million during the entire 2008 election. He reported that only $11.4 million had been reported to the FEC, with the rest of the "dark money" coming from groups that did not have to disclose their donors. 27% of the money spent supporting Tillis came from groups required to disclose their donors whereas 69% of the money supporting Hagan did so.

OpenSecrets placed the final cost of outside spending at $8.5 million for Hagan and $35.5 million attacking Tillis, and $13.7 million for Tillis and $20.9 million attacking Hagan, placing the totals by candidate at $44 million for Hagan, and $34.6 million for Tillis.

=== Debates ===
Three televised debates between the candidates were held: the first on September 3 moderated by Norah O'Donnell of CBS, the second on October 7 moderated by George Stephanopoulos of ABC, and the third (the only one to feature Sean Haugh) on October 9 moderated by Jon Evans of WECT-TV.

Video of the first debate is available here, with the second here and the third here.

=== Predictions ===
Source	Ranking	As of
The Cook Political Report	Tossup	November 3, 2014
Sabato's Crystal Ball	Lean D	November 3, 2014
Rothenberg Political Report	Tossup	November 3, 2014
Real Clear Politics	Tossup	November 3, 2014

=== Polling ===
Poll source	Date(s) administered	Sample size	Margin of error	Kay Hagan (D)	Thom Tillis (R)	Sean Haugh (L)	Other	Undecided
Public Policy Polling	December 6–9, 2012	578	± 4.1%	48%	38%	—	—	14%
Public Policy Polling	January 10–13, 2013	608	± 4%	47%	37%	—	—	16%
Public Policy Polling	February 7–10, 2013	600	± 4%	46%	38%	—	—	16%
Public Policy Polling	March 7–10, 2013	611	± 4%	50%	36%	—	—	14%
Public Policy Polling	April 11–14, 2013	601	± 4%	49%	39%	—	—	11%
Public Policy Polling	May 17–20, 2013	500	± 4.4%	48%	41%	—	—	11%
Public Policy Polling	June 12–14, 2013	500	± 4.4%	45%	40%	—	—	15%
Public Policy Polling	July 12–14, 2013	600	± 4%	49%	38%	—	—	12%
Public Policy Polling	August 8–11, 2013	600	± 4%	47%	39%	—	—	14%
Public Policy Polling	September 6–9, 2013	600	± 4%	51%	36%	—	—	14%
Public Policy Polling	October 4–6, 2013	746	± ?%	47%	40%	—	—	13%
Public Policy Polling	November 8–11, 2013	701	± 4%	44%	42%	—	—	14%
Public Policy Polling	December 5–8, 2013	1,281	± 2.7%	44%	42%	—	—	14%
Public Policy Polling	January 9–12, 2014	1,384	± 2.6%	42%	43%	—	—	15%
Harper Polling	January 20–21, 2014	778	± 3.51%	44%	44%	—	—	12%
Rasmussen Reports	January 22–23, 2014	500	± 4.5%	40%	47%	—	3%	10%
Public Policy Polling	February 6–9, 2014	708	± 3.7%	40%	42%	—	—	17%
American Insights	February 11–15, 2014	611	± 4%	38%	35%	—	—	26%
Hickman Analytics	February 17–20, 2014	400	± 4.9%	45%	41%	—	—	13%
Public Policy Polling	March 6–9, 2014	884	± 3.3%	45%	43%	—	—	13%
SurveyUSA	March 27–31, 2014	1,489	± 2.6%	45%	46%	—	—	9%
Public Policy Polling	April 3–6, 2014	740	± 3.6%	43%	41%	—	—	16%
New York Times/Kaiser Family	April 8–15, 2014	900	± ?	42%	40%	—	5%	14%
Magellan Strategies	April 14–15, 2014	804	± 3.46%	43%	43%	—	8%	6%
Rasmussen Reports	May 7–8, 2014	750	± 4%	44%	45%	—	5%	7%
Public Policy Polling	May 9–11, 2014	877	± 3.3%	38%	36%	11%	—	15%
Public Policy Polling	May 9–11, 2014	877	± 3.3%	41%	41%	—	—	18%
Civitas Institute	May 20–22, 2014	600	± 4%	36%	39%	8%	—	15%
Civitas Institute	May 20–22, 2014	600	± 4%	41%	46%	—	—	12%
Magellan Strategies	June 5–8, 2014	700	± 3.7%	47%	46%	—	—	7%
Public Policy Polling	June 12–15, 2014	1,076	± 3%	39%	34%	11%	—	16%
Public Policy Polling	June 12–15, 2014	1,076	± 3%	42%	38%	—	—	20%
Civitas Institute	June 18–19 & 22, 2014	600	± 4%	42%	36%	9%	—	12%
Civitas Institute	June 18–19 & 22, 2014	600	± 4%	47%	43%	—	—	9%
Public Policy Polling	July 17–20, 2014	1,062	± 3%	41%	34%	8%	—	16%
Public Policy Polling	July 17–20, 2014	1,062	± 3%	42%	39%	—	—	19%
CBS News/NYT/YouGov	July 5–24, 2014	2,678	± 3.5%	44%	45%	—	2%	7%
Gravis Marketing	July 22–27, 2014	1,380	± 3%	44%	41%	—	—	15%
Civitas Institute	July 28–29, 2014	600	± 4%	41%	39%	7%	—	12%
Civitas Institute	July 28–29, 2014	600	± 4%	43%	45%	—	—	10%
Rasmussen Reports	August 5–6, 2014	750	± 4%	40%	45%	—	6%	9%
Public Policy Polling	August 14–17, 2014	856	± 3.4%	42%	38%	8%	—	13%
Public Policy Polling	August 14–17, 2014	856	± 3.4%	43%	42%	—	—	14%
Suffolk University	August 16–19, 2014	500	± 4.4%	45.4%	43%	5.2%	—	6.4%
CBS News/NYT/YouGov	August 18 – September 2, 2014	2,059	± 3%	42%	43%	5%	0%	10%
Garin-Hart-Yang	September 3–6, 2014	802	± 3.5%	48%	45%	—	—	7%
Elon University	September 5–9, 2014	629 LV	± 3.91%	44.9%	40.8%	—	9.1%	5.2%
Elon University	September 5–9, 2014	983 RV	± 3.13%	42.7%	36.8%	—	10.7%	9.8%
American Insights	September 5–10, 2014	459	± 4.6%	46%	36%	6%	—	13%
Rasmussen Reports	September 8–10, 2014	1,000	± 4%	45%	39%	—	6%	9%
Civitas Institute	September 9–10, 2014	490	± 4.5%	46%	43%	5%	—	6%
Civitas Institute	September 9–10, 2014	490	± 4.5%	47%	46%	—	—	7%
Public Policy Polling	September 11–14, 2014	1,266	± 2.8%	44%	40%	5%	—	11%
Public Policy Polling	September 11–14, 2014	1,266	± 2.8%	46%	42%	—	—	12%
Fox News	September 14–16, 2014	605	± 4%	41%	36%	6%	—	13%
High Point University	September 13–18, 2014	410	± 5%	42%	40%	6%	—	12%
Global Strategy Group	September 16–18, 2014	600	± 4.9%	45%	41%	5%	—	9%
Gravis Marketing	September 22–23, 2014	860	± 3%	46%	42%	—	—	12%
CNN/ORC	September 22–25, 2014	595 LV	± 4%	46%	43%	7%	—	4%
CNN/ORC	September 22–25, 2014	860	± 3.5%	46%	39%	9%	—	6%
Civitas	September 25, 27–28, 2014	600	± 4%	46%	41%	4%	1%	8%
Civitas	September 25, 27–28, 2014	860	± 3.5%	50%	43%	—	—	8%
CBS News/NYT/YouGov	September 20 – October 1, 2014	2,002	± 3%	46%	45%	2%	1%	6%
Greenberg Quinlan Rosner	September 25 – October 1, 2014	1,000	± 2.09%	45%	41%	—	14%	
NBC News/Marist	September 27 – October 1, 2014	665 LV	± 3.8%	44%	40%	7%	<1%	9%
NBC News/Marist	September 27 – October 1, 2014	1,132 RV	± 2.9%	42%	37%	8%	1%	12%
Morey Group	October 1–6, 2014	956	± 3.2%	40.1%	37.8%	—	2%	20.2%
Suffolk University	October 4–7, 2014	500	± 4.4%	46.8%	45.4%	4.4%	—	3.4%
Rasmussen Reports	October 6–7, 2014	970	± 3%	48%	46%	—	2%	4%
High Point University	September 30 – October 2 and October 4–9, 2014	584	± 4.1%	39.5%	40.4%	7%	—	13%
SurveyUSA	October 10–12, 2014	554	± 4.2%	44%	41%	7%	—	8%
SurveyUSA	October 10–12, 2014	554	± 4.2%	45%	46%	—	—	9%
Civitas Institute	October 15–18, 2014	600	± 4%	41%	42%	6%	—	11%
Civitas Institute	October 15–18, 2014	600	± 4%	44%	44%	—	—	12%
Gravis Marketing	October 16–18, 2014	1,022	± 3%	43%	48%	—	—	9%
Public Policy Polling	October 16–18, 2014	780	± 3.5%	46%	43%	5%	—	7%
Public Policy Polling	October 16–18, 2014	780	± 3.5%	47%	44%	—	—	8%
SurveyUSA	October 16–20, 2014	568	± 4.2%	46%	43%	6%	—	5%
CBS News/NYT/YouGov	October 16–23, 2014	1,910	± 4%	44%	41%	2%	0%	13%
NBC News/Marist	October 19–23, 2014	756 LV	± 3.6%	43%	43%	7%	<1%	6%
NBC News/Marist	October 19–23, 2014	1,070 RV	± 3%	42%	40%	8%	1%	9%
SurveyUSA	October 21–25, 2014	802	± 4%	44%	44%	5%	3%	5%
Elon University	October 21–25, 2014	687 LV	± 3.74%	44.7%	40.7%	—	6.3%	6.6%
Elon University	October 21–25, 2014	996 RV	± 3.11%	44.8%	37.5%	—	7.7%	8.5%
Monmouth University	October 23–26, 2014	432	± 4.7%	48%	46%	1%	—	4%
Vox Populi	October 26–27, 2014	615	± 3.95%	43%	48%	—	—	9%
Public Policy Polling	October 28–29, 2014	657	± ?	47%	46%	4%	—	3%
Rasmussen Reports	October 28–29, 2014	982	± 3%	47%	46%	—	3%	3%
CNN/ORC	October 27–30, 2014	559 LV	± 4%	48%	46%	4%	—	2%
CNN/ORC	October 27–30, 2014	896 RV	± 3.5%	47%	41%	8%	—	4%
Fox News	October 28–30, 2014	909	± 3%	43%	42%	4%	1%	9%
Harper Polling	October 28–30, 2014	511	± 4.34%	44%	46%	6%	—	4%
Harper Polling	October 28–30, 2014	511	± 4.34%	45%	48%	—	—	7%
Civitas Institute	October 29–30, 2014	600	± 4%	41%	41%	6%	—	10%
Civitas Institute	October 29–30, 2014	600	± 4%	45%	44%	—	—	11%
Gravis Marketing	October 29–30, 2014	1,006	± 3%	46%	47%	—	—	8%
YouGov	October 25–31, 2014	1,727	± 3%	44%	41%	—	3%	12%
Public Policy Polling	October 30–31, 2014	738	± ?	46%	45%	4%	—	5%
Public Policy Polling	November 1–3, 2014	1,333	± 2.7%	46%	44%	5%	—	6%
Public Policy Polling	November 1–3, 2014	1,333	± 2.7%	48%	46%	—	—	6%

Hypothetical polling

Poll source	Date(s) administered	Sample size	Margin of error	Kay Hagan (D)	Ted Alexander (R)	Undecided
Public Policy Polling	February 6–9, 2014	708	± 3.7%	38%	45%	17%
Public Policy Polling	March 6–9, 2014	884	± 3.3%	43%	45%	12%
SurveyUSA	March 27–31, 2014	1,489	± 2.6%	44%	46%	10%
Public Policy Polling	April 3–6, 2014	740	± 3.6%	42%	43%	15%

Poll source	Date(s) administered	Sample size	Margin of error	Kay Hagan (D)	Phil Berger (R)	Undecided
Public Policy Polling	January 10–13, 2013	608	± 4%	47%	38%	15%
Public Policy Polling	February 7–10, 2013	600	± 4%	49%	38%	13%
Public Policy Polling	March 7–10, 2013	611	± 4%	51%	37%	12%
Public Policy Polling	April 11–14, 2013	601	± 4%	48%	39%	13%
Public Policy Polling	May 17–20, 2013	500	± 4.4%	46%	42%	12%
Public Policy Polling	June 12–14, 2013	500	± 4.4%	44%	40%	17%
Public Policy Polling	July 12–14, 2013	600	± 4%	49%	39%	12%
Public Policy Polling	August 8–11, 2013	600	± 4%	47%	39%	14%
Public Policy Polling	September 6–9, 2013	600	± 4%	53%	36%	11%

Poll source	Date(s) administered	Sample size	Margin of error	Kay Hagan (D)	Cherie K. Berry (R)	Undecided
Public Policy Polling	February 7–10, 2013	600	± 4%	46%	38%	16%
Public Policy Polling	March 7–10, 2013	611	± 4%	50%	38%	12%
Public Policy Polling	April 11–14, 2013	601	± 4%	46%	41%	13%
Public Policy Polling	May 17–20, 2013	500	± 4.4%	45%	45%	9%

Poll source	Date(s) administered	Sample size	Margin of error	Kay Hagan (D)	Alex Bradshaw (R)	Undecided
Public Policy Polling	March 6–9, 2014	884	± 3.3%	43%	43%	14%
Public Policy Polling	April 3–6, 2014	740	± 3.6%	41%	42%	17%

Poll source	Date(s) administered	Sample size	Margin of error	Kay Hagan (D)	Greg Brannon (R)	Other	Undecided
Public Policy Polling	February 7–10, 2013	600	± 4%	48%	35%	—	17%
Public Policy Polling	March 7–10, 2013	611	± 4%	51%	36%	—	13%
Public Policy Polling	April 11–14, 2013	601	± 4%	49%	36%	—	15%
Public Policy Polling	May 17–20, 2013	500	± 4.4%	49%	40%	—	11%
Public Policy Polling	June 12–14, 2013	500	± 4.4%	44%	40%	—	15%
Public Policy Polling	July 12–14, 2013	600	± 4%	49%	39%	—	12%
Public Policy Polling	August 8–11, 2013	600	± 4%	47%	38%	—	15%
Public Policy Polling	September 6–9, 2013	600	± 4%	52%	36%	—	12%
Public Policy Polling	October 4–6, 2013	746	± ?%	46%	40%	—	14%
Public Policy Polling	November 8–11, 2013	701	± 4%	43%	44%	—	14%
Public Policy Polling	December 5–8, 2013	1,281	± 2.7%	43%	45%	—	11%
Public Policy Polling	January 9–12, 2014	1,384	± 2.6%	41%	43%	—	16%
Rasmussen Reports	January 22–23, 2014	500	± 4.5%	39%	43%	4%	14%
Public Policy Polling	February 6–9, 2014	708	± 3.7%	40%	43%	—	17%
American Insights	February 11–15, 2014	611	± 4%	38%	36%	—	26%
Public Policy Polling	March 6–9, 2014	884	± 3.3%	43%	43%	—	14%
SurveyUSA	March 27–31, 2014	1,489	± 2.6%	45%	47%	—	9%
Public Policy Polling	April 3–6, 2014	740	± 3.6%	40%	42%	—	18%
New York Times/Kaiser Family	April 8–15, 2014	900	± ?	41%	39%	4%	17%

Poll source	Date(s) administered	Sample size	Margin of error	Kay Hagan (D)	James P. Cain (R)	Undecided
Public Policy Polling	May 17–20, 2013	500	± 4.4%	48%	41%	11%
Public Policy Polling	June 12–14, 2013	500	± 4.4%	46%	38%	16%
Public Policy Polling	July 12–14, 2013	600	± 4%	49%	36%	15%
Public Policy Polling	August 8–11, 2013	600	± 4%	46%	39%	14%
Public Policy Polling	September 6–9, 2013	600	± 4%	50%	37%	13%

Poll source	Date(s) administered	Sample size	Margin of error	Kay Hagan (D)	Renee Ellmers (R)	Undecided
Public Policy Polling	December 6–9, 2012	578	± 4.1%	45%	39%	19%
Public Policy Polling	January 10–13, 2013	608	± 4%	46%	40%	14%
Public Policy Polling	February 7–10, 2013	600	± 4%	47%	38%	15%
Public Policy Polling	March 7–10, 2013	611	± 4%	49%	36%	15%
Public Policy Polling	April 11–14, 2013	601	± 4%	48%	40%	12%
Public Policy Polling	May 17–20, 2013	500	± 4.4%	48%	39%	12%
Public Policy Polling	June 12–14, 2013	500	± 4.4%	46%	39%	15%
Public Policy Polling	July 12–14, 2013	600	± 4%	49%	36%	14%

Poll source	Date(s) administered	Sample size	Margin of error	Kay Hagan (D)	Terry Embler (R)	Undecided
Public Policy Polling	February 7–10, 2013	600	± 4%	48%	33%	20%
Public Policy Polling	March 7–10, 2013	611	± 4%	52%	33%	15%
Public Policy Polling	April 11–14, 2013	601	± 4%	47%	37%	16%

Poll source	Date(s) administered	Sample size	Margin of error	Kay Hagan (D)	Bill Flynn (R)	Undecided
Public Policy Polling	December 5–8, 2013	1,281	± 2.7%	43%	45%	12%
Public Policy Polling	January 9–12, 2014	1,384	± 2.6%	42%	44%	15%

Poll source	Date(s) administered	Sample size	Margin of error	Kay Hagan (D)	Dan Forest (R)	Undecided
Public Policy Polling	March 7–10, 2013	611	± 4%	50%	40%	11%

Poll source	Date(s) administered	Sample size	Margin of error	Kay Hagan (D)	Virginia Foxx (R)	Undecided
Public Policy Polling	December 6–9, 2012	578	± 4.1%	49%	39%	12%
Public Policy Polling	January 10–13, 2013	608	± 4%	47%	40%	13%
Public Policy Polling	February 7–10, 2013	600	± 4%	48%	38%	15%
Public Policy Polling	March 7–10, 2013	611	± 4%	49%	37%	14%
Public Policy Polling	April 11–14, 2013	601	± 4%	48%	39%	13%
Public Policy Polling	May 17–20, 2013	500	± 4.4%	49%	42%	10%
Public Policy Polling	June 12–14, 2013	500	± 4.4%	46%	39%	15%
Public Policy Polling	July 12–14, 2013	600	± 4%	49%	37%	13%
Public Policy Polling	August 8–11, 2013	600	± 4%	48%	39%	13%

Poll source	Date(s) administered	Sample size	Margin of error	Kay Hagan (D)	Heather Grant (R)	Undecided
Public Policy Polling	August 8–11, 2013	600	± 4%	47%	37%	16%
Public Policy Polling	September 6–9, 2013	600	± 4%	48%	36%	15%
Public Policy Polling	November 8–11, 2013	701	± 4%	43%	40%	17%
Public Policy Polling	December 5–8, 2013	1,281	± 2.7%	43%	43%	14%
Public Policy Polling	January 9–12, 2014	1,384	± 2.6%	41%	42%	17%
Public Policy Polling	February 6–9, 2014	708	± 3.7%	39%	41%	20%
Public Policy Polling	March 6–9, 2014	884	± 3.3%	43%	42%	15%
SurveyUSA	March 27–31, 2014	1,489	± 2.6%	44%	46%	10%
Public Policy Polling	April 3–6, 2014	740	± 3.6%	39%	43%	19%

Poll source	Date(s) administered	Sample size	Margin of error	Kay Hagan (D)	Mark Harris (R)	Undecided
Public Policy Polling	May 17–20, 2013	500	± 4.4%	46%	40%	13%
Public Policy Polling	June 12–14, 2013	500	± 4.4%	46%	37%	17%
Public Policy Polling	July 12–14, 2013	600	± 4%	49%	35%	15%
Public Policy Polling	August 8–11, 2013	600	± 4%	46%	37%	16%
Public Policy Polling	September 6–9, 2013	600	± 4%	50%	36%	14%
Public Policy Polling	October 4–6, 2013	746	± ?%	46%	38%	16%
Public Policy Polling	November 8–11, 2013	701	± 4%	43%	41%	16%
Public Policy Polling	December 5–8, 2013	1,281	± 2.7%	43%	43%	14%
Public Policy Polling	January 9–12, 2014	1,384	± 2.6%	41%	43%	16%
Harper Polling	January 20–21, 2014	778	± 3.51%	44%	40%	15%
Public Policy Polling	February 6–9, 2014	708	± 3.7%	40%	42%	18%
American Insights	February 11–15, 2014	611	± 4%	39%	35%	26%
Public Policy Polling	March 6–9, 2014	884	± 3.3%	43%	43%	14%
SurveyUSA	March 27–31, 2014	1,489	± 2.6%	43%	47%	10%
Public Policy Polling	April 3–6, 2014	740	± 3.6%	40%	44%	17%

Poll source	Date(s) administered	Sample size	Margin of error	Kay Hagan (D)	George Holding (R)	Undecided
Public Policy Polling	December 6–9, 2012	578	± 4.1%	48%	39%	13%
Public Policy Polling	January 10–13, 2013	608	± 4%	45%	37%	18%
Public Policy Polling	February 7–10, 2013	600	± 4%	46%	36%	19%

Poll source	Date(s) administered	Sample size	Margin of error	Kay Hagan (D)	Edward Kryn (R)	Undecided
Public Policy Polling	February 6–9, 2014	708	± 3.7%	40%	40%	20%
Public Policy Polling	March 6–9, 2014	884	± 3.3%	43%	41%	16%
Public Policy Polling	April 3–6, 2014	740	± 3.6%	40%	41%	19%

Poll source	Date(s) administered	Sample size	Margin of error	Kay Hagan (D)	Patrick McHenry (R)	Undecided
Public Policy Polling	December 6–9, 2012	578	± 4.1%	48%	40%	12%
Public Policy Polling	January 10–13, 2013	608	± 4%	45%	39%	16%
Public Policy Polling	February 7–10, 2013	600	± 4%	45%	40%	15%
Public Policy Polling	March 7–10, 2013	611	± 4%	49%	39%	12%

Poll source	Date(s) administered	Sample size	Margin of error	Kay Hagan (D)	Sue Myrick (R)	Undecided
Public Policy Polling	December 6–9, 2012	578	± 4.1%	45%	44%	11%

Poll source	Date(s) administered	Sample size	Margin of error	Kay Hagan (D)	Robert Pittenger (R)	Undecided
Public Policy Polling	January 10–13, 2013	608	± 4%	46%	38%	16%

Poll source	Date(s) administered	Sample size	Margin of error	Kay Hagan (D)	Jim Snyder (R)	Undecided
Public Policy Polling	March 6–9, 2014	884	± 3.3%	42%	43%	15%
Public Policy Polling	April 3–6, 2014	740	± 3.6%	41%	41%	18%

Poll source	Date(s) administered	Sample size	Margin of error	Kay Hagan (D)	Lynn Wheeler (R)	Undecided
Public Policy Polling	June 12–14, 2013	500	± 4.4%	45%	36%	19%
Public Policy Polling	July 12–14, 2013	600	± 4%	49%	34%	17%
Public Policy Polling	August 8–11, 2013	600	± 4%	47%	36%	17%
Public Policy Polling	September 6–9, 2013	600	± 4%	48%	35%	17%

=== Results ===
2014 United States Senate election in North Carolina
Party	Candidate	Votes	%	±%
Republican	Thom Tillis	1,423,259	48.82%	+4.64%
Democratic	Kay Hagan (incumbent)	1,377,651	47.26%	−5.39%
Libertarian	Sean Haugh	109,100	3.74%	+0.57%
Write-in		5,271	0.18%	+0.14%
Total votes		2,915,281	100.00%	N/A
Republican gain from Democratic				

==== Counties that flipped from Democratic to Republican ====
- Caswell (largest city: Yanceyville)
- Duplin (largest city: Wallace)
- Franklin (largest city: Wake Forest)
- Haywood (largest city: Waynesville)
- Jones (largest city: Maysville)
- Madison (largest city: Mars Hill)
- Montgomery (largest city: Troy)
- Chowan (largest municipality: Edenton)
- Columbus (largest municipality: Whiteville)
- Nash (largest municipality: Rocky Mount)
- New Hanover (largest municipality: Wilmington)
- Watauga (largest municipality: Boone)
- Alamance (largest municipality: Burlington)
- Brunswick (largest municipality: Leland)
- Greene (largest municipality: Snow Hill)
- Lee (largest municipality: Sanford)
- Person (largest municipality: Roxboro)
- Rockingham (largest municipality: Eden)
- Yancey (largest municipality: Burnsville)
- Pender (largest municipality: Hampstead)
- Sampson (largest municipality: Clinton)
- Swain (largest municipality: Cherokee)
- Washington (largest municipality: Plymouth)

== See also ==
- 2014 United States Senate elections
- 2014 United States elections
