= Bob Eaves =

First Gentleman of North Carolina

First Gentleman of North Carolina
- In role January 10, 2009 – January 5, 2013
- Governor: Bev Perdue
- Preceded by: Mary P. Easley (as First Lady)
- Succeeded by: Ann McCrory (as First Lady)

Second Gentleman of North Carolina
- In role January 6, 2001 – January 10, 2009
- Lieutenant Governor: Bev Perdue
- Preceded by: Alisa O'Quinn Wicker (as Second Lady)
- Succeeded by: Lucille Dalton (as Second Lady)

Personal details
- Born: Robert Wendell Eaves, Jr. Washington, D.C., U.S.
- Party: Republican (until 1997); Independent (1997-present)
- Spouse: Bev Perdue (m. 1997)
- Children: 2
- Education: University of North Carolina at Chapel Hill
- Occupation: accountant businessman

Robert Wendell Eaves, Jr. is an American accountant and businessman. As the husband of Bev Perdue, he served as the Second Gentleman of North Carolina from 2001 to 2009 and as the First Gentleman of North Carolina from 2009 to 2013. Eaves's wife was the first female lieutenant governor and governor, making him the first second gentleman and first gentleman of the state.

As first gentleman, Eaves collaborated with the North Carolina Department of Public Instruction and the North Carolina Business Committee for Education to launch Students@Work, a program focused on raising North Carolina's graduation rate by providing students with workplace experiences. He also organized Carolina Helping Heroes, a program that connects volunteer organizations with military families in need of support.

== Career ==
Eaves graduated with an accounting degree from the University of North Carolina at Chapel Hill in 1958. He moved to Atlanta, Georgia and worked as a Certified Public Accountant with Arthur Anderson & Co. After working as an accountant for three years, he began working in the retail gasoline and convenience store business. Eaves is the chief executive officer of The Right Stuff Food Stores. He was also an executive at Globe Oil, the parent company of the Starvin Marvin convenience store chain.

Eaves served as an officer in the United States Navy.

== Public life ==
In 2001, upon his wife's election as the first woman Lieutenant Governor of North Carolina, he became the first Second Gentleman of North Carolina. When his wife was elected as the first woman Governor of North Carolina in 2009, he became the state's first First Gentleman. Although Eaves's wife is a Democrat, he is registered as an Independent voter and was previously registered Republican. He accompanied his wife to her first State of the State address to the North Carolina General Assembly in March 2011.

In March 2009, he accompanied his wife on an official tour of Western North Carolina. In December 2009, Eaves attended a kick-off ceremony for Homes for Our Troops.

In March 2010, he launched Carolina Helping Heroes, a program that connects volunteer organizations to military spouses who need support during their spouse's deployment.

On February 24, 2011, Eaves commemorated the thirtieth anniversary of the N.C. Jaycee Burn Center at UNC Medical Center with an official visit to the center, which opened on February 23, 1981. He was taken on a tour of the facilities by Bruce Cairns, the Burn Center Medical Director, Grace Schmits, the Burn Center nurse manager, and Anthony Meyer, the chairman of the UNC School of Medicine's Department of Surgery.

He hosted a reception at the North Carolina Executive Mansion on September 13, 2011 for the winners of the Best Dish in North Carolina competition.

In July 2012, Eaves greeted over two dozen wounded veterans at the North Carolina State Capitol who were on the third leg of the 2012 North Carolina Warrior Ride.

Eaves served on the boards of the Public School Forum of North Carolina, the James B. Hunt Institute for Educational Leadership, the University of North Carolina School of Education Foundation, and Meredith College. Eaves was also a member of the University of North Carolina's board of visitors and led fundraising efforts for a veterans memorial on campus.

=== Educational initiative ===
Eaves launched Students@Work, a program focused on raising North Carolina's graduation rate by providing middle school students opportunities to connect classroom learning with workplace experiences. He launched the program in New Bern in 2010, collaborating with the North Carolina Department of Public Instruction and the North Carolina Business Committee for Education. The program included over thirty companies across the state. On January 31, 2011, he visited the State Employees Credit Union Raleigh Centennial Parkway branch in Raleigh to launch the NC Business Committee for Education's Students@Work Week. He spoke with a group of students from Centennial Middle School about the importance of education in relation to success in the workplace. Later that day, he spoke with students from Aycock Middle School at the State Employees Credit Union's branch on Summit Avenue in Greensboro. He spoke with students from West Millbrook Middle School at the State Employees’ Credit Union Stonehenge branch in Raleigh on February 28, 2012.

== Personal life ==
Eaves was born in Washington, D.C. His father, Robert Wendell Eaves Sr., was an elementary school principal and executive secretary of the Department of Elementary School Principals at the National Educational Association.

Eaves married Beverly Marlene Moore Perdue on October 2, 1997. He is her second husband. They own homes in Chapel Hill and New Bern. He and his wife owned a Tibetan terrier named Zipper while living in the North Carolina Executive Mansion.

Honorary titles
Preceded by Mary P. Easley (as First Lady)	First Gentleman of North Carolina; 2009–2013	Succeeded by Ann McCrory (as First Lady)
Preceded by Alisa O'Quinn Wicker (as Second Lady)	Second Gentleman of North Carolina; 2001–2009	Succeeded by Lucille Dalton (as Second Lady)
