= Bev Perdue =

Governor of North Carolina from 2009 to 2013

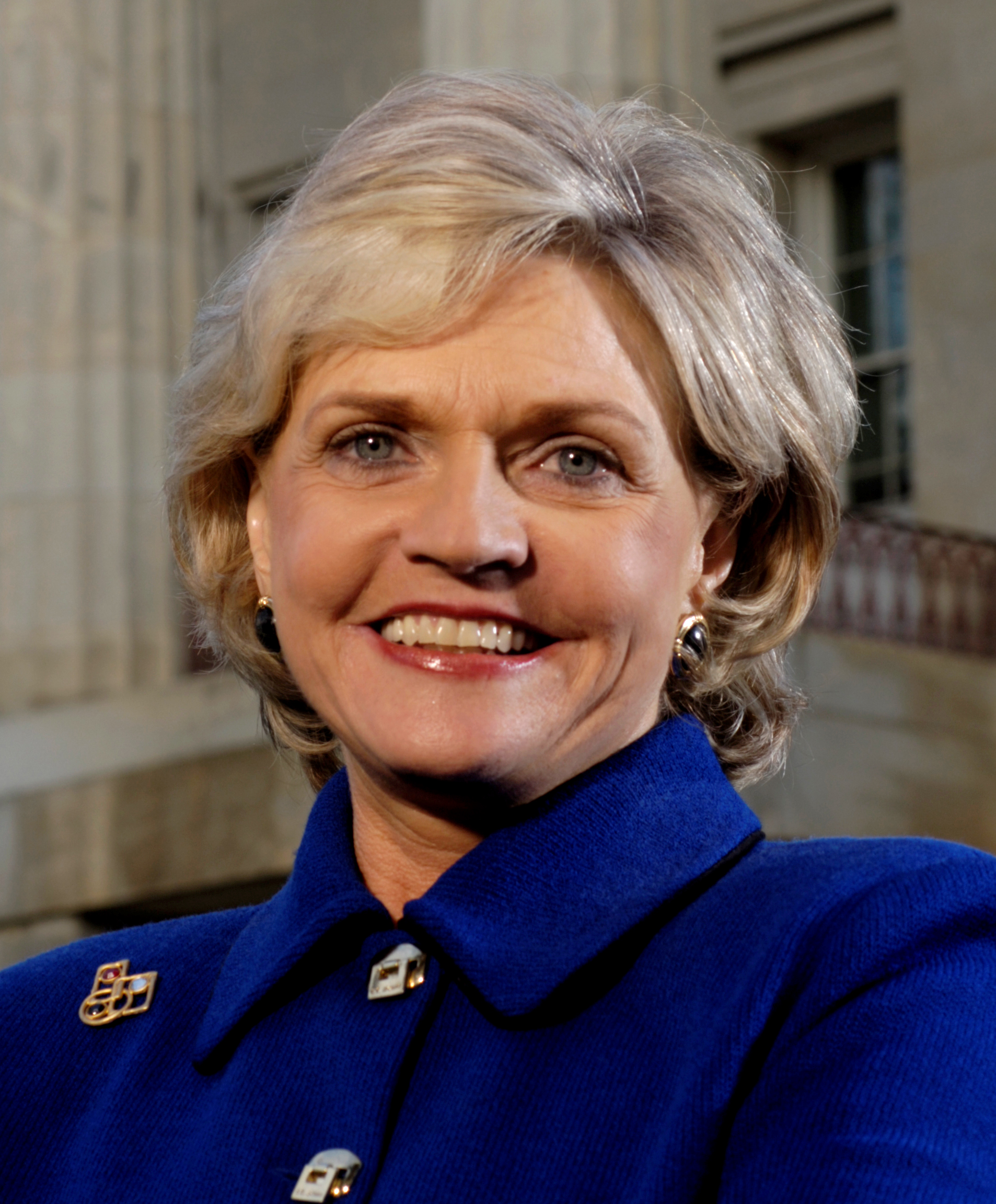
- Perdue in 2008

73rd Governor of North Carolina
- In office January 10, 2009 – January 5, 2013
- Lieutenant: Walter Dalton
- Preceded by: Mike Easley
- Succeeded by: Pat McCrory

32nd Lieutenant Governor of North Carolina
- In office January 6, 2001 – January 10, 2009
- Governor: Mike Easley
- Preceded by: Dennis Wicker
- Succeeded by: Walter Dalton

Member of the North Carolina Senate from the 3rd district
- In office January 3, 1991 – January 3, 2001
- Preceded by: Bill Barker
- Succeeded by: Scott Thomas

Member of the North Carolina House of Representatives from the 3rd district
- In office January 1987 – January 1991
- Preceded by: Chris Barker
- Succeeded by: William L. Wainwright

Personal details
- Born: Beverly Marlene Moore; January 14, 1947 (age 79) Grundy, Virginia, U.S.
- Party: Democratic
- Spouses: Gary Perdue (m. 1970; div. 1994); Bob Eaves (m. 1997)
- Children: 2
- Education: University of Kentucky (BA); University of Florida (MEd, PhD)

Beverly Marlene Eaves Perdue (née Moore; January 14, 1947) is an American businesswoman, politician, and member of the Democratic Party who served as the 73rd governor of North Carolina from 2009 to 2013. She was the first woman to serve as governor of North Carolina.

Perdue started her political career in the 1980s, serving in the North Carolina House of Representatives. She then served five terms in the North Carolina Senate, before she was elected as the 32nd Lieutenant Governor of North Carolina. She was the first woman to serve as the state's lieutenant governor. Perdue was elected to the office of Governor of North Carolina in 2008 against Charlotte Mayor Pat McCrory.

On January 26, 2012, facing sinking approval ratings, Perdue announced that she would not seek reelection in the 2012 gubernatorial election, becoming the first Democratic governor since Robert W. Scott to have served a single term, and is currently the only Democratic governor in the state's history to not seek re-election.

Since the death of Jim Hunt in 2025, Perdue is North Carolina's oldest surviving Democratic governor.

== Early life and education ==
Beverly Marlene Moore was born in 1947 in Grundy, Virginia, the daughter of Alfred P. and Irene Morefield Moore. Her father was a coal miner and co-founder of a coal mining company, who went on to become CEO of a large utility company. She earned a B.A. degree in history in 1969 from the University of Kentucky, where she was a member of Kappa Kappa Gamma, as well as a M.Ed. degree in community college administration in 1974 and a Ph.D., degree in Education Administration in 1976, both from the University of Florida.

== North Carolina legislature ==
Perdue, a Democrat, served in the North Carolina House of Representatives from 1987 to 1991, and in the North Carolina Senate from 1991 to 2001. She represented Craven, Lenoir and Pamlico counties in the House and Craven, Carteret and Pamlico in the Senate.

=== Elections ===
In 1990, she ran for the State Senate in North Carolina's 3rd Senate District, vacated by retiring State Senator Bill Barker (D-Pamlico County). In 1996, she won re-election against Republican Holt Faircloth, Carteret County Commissioner, 60%-40%. In 1998, she won re-election against Republican George Hipps 60%-40%.

=== Tenure ===
During her last three terms in the Senate, she served as co-chair of the Appropriations Committee While she was in office, the General Assembly increased teacher pay and passed Governor Jim Hunt's Excellent Schools Act and Smart Start. Additionally, she led the debate that created North Carolina's Clean Water Management Trust Fund. She fought for more benefits for senior citizens.

=== Committee assignments ===
She served in the House Judiciary Committee. She was Chairwoman of the Senate Education Committee.

== Lieutenant governor ==
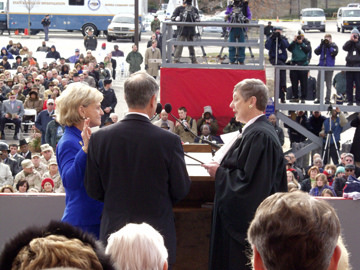
Perdue being sworn in during 2005

In 2000, she defeated Republican Betsy Cochrane for the lieutenant governor's seat, becoming North Carolina's first woman lieutenant governor; she was re-elected in 2004. As lieutenant governor, Perdue's most significant act was casting the tie-breaking vote that established the North Carolina Education Lottery.

== 2008 gubernatorial election ==
Perdue announced her 2008 candidacy for governor on October 1, 2007, at her hometown, New Bern, North Carolina. On October 22, 2007, pro-choice Emily's List endorsed her campaign. On May 6, 2008, Perdue won the Democratic nomination for governor, defeating State Treasurer Richard H. Moore and Dennis Nielsen.

Perdue raised $15 million for the general election and ran ads against her Republican opponent, Charlotte Mayor Pat McCrory, criticizing him for not being tough enough on illegal immigration. Her 2008 gubernatorial campaign was under both state and federal investigation for donation irregularities and was fined $30,000 in 2010. Despite a national Democratic tide and Perdue's fundraising edge, in the general election campaign McCrory led Perdue at first; Perdue slowly gained as the Democratic candidate. Perdue and McCrory remained close, with the two often polling in a statistical tie in what was the closest race for governor in the nation. Perdue ran slightly behind her opponent in polls released the week before the election. Pundits speculated that Perdue was hurt by current Democratic Governor Mike Easley's decreasing popularity and McCrory's efforts to tag her as part of the Political corruption in Raleigh: consultants mentioned Perdue's "difficulty of being the candidate of continuity in a change election."

While McCrory received the endorsement of most major newspapers in the state (which typically endorse Democrats), Perdue received the endorsement of actor and director Andy Griffith, who filmed a campaign ad on her behalf.

Perdue defeated McCrory on November 4, 2008, 50.3% to 46.9%.

=== Late reporting fine ===
In late 2010, Perdue's 2008 campaign came under State and Federal investigation for the late reporting of 41 private flights. The campaign was fined $30,000 in August 2010 by the State Board of Elections for the late reporting of flights which were discovered after a 2009 self-audit, but that body declined to investigate further after deciding that the Perdue Campaign did not intentionally violate the law.

== Governor of North Carolina ==
Perdue was sworn in as the 73rd Governor of North Carolina on January 10, 2009.

=== Political positions ===
Perdue's Senate record followed the lines of the Democratic caucus. As a member of the Board of Community Colleges, she voted against allowing illegal immigrants to attend the schools even if they graduated from a North Carolina high school. She had previously said she would admit every high school graduate to community college tuition-free. In late February and early March 2009, she announced that $93 million from the educational lottery would be used to ensure there is money available for the state's day-to-day operations.

In her first use of the veto power, Gov. Perdue vetoed a bill that would have made various documents that lawmakers use in drafting legislation confidential.

She also vetoed a bill that would have required voters to show photo ID before casting their ballots.

She vetoed a bill that would have allowed fracking in North Carolina. The veto was overridden in July 2012.

Perdue signed Susie's Law in 2010, which authorizes up to ten months in jail for convicted perpetrators of cruelty to animals.

=== Remarks about suspending Congressional elections ===
On September 27, 2011, Perdue introduced the idea of suspending the Congressional elections. She told the Cary Rotary Club, "You have to have more ability from Congress, I think, to work together and to get over the partisan bickering and focus on fixing things. I think we ought to suspend, perhaps, elections for Congress for two years and just tell them we won't hold it against them, whatever decisions they make, to just let them help this country recover. I really hope that someone can agree with me on that. The one good thing about Raleigh is that for so many years we worked across party lines. It's a little bit more contentious now but it's not impossible to try to do what's right in this state. You want people who don't worry about the next election." Her press secretary later claimed that the statement was intended as a joke. Audio of the speech was subsequently released.

=== Hurricane Irene ===
Governor Perdue oversaw the state's preparation and response to Hurricane Irene in 2011 It was seen by some political observers as a defining moment of her tenure.

=== Governor's Task Force on Eugenics Compensation ===
In response to the findings of the Governor's Task Force on Eugenics Compensation, Perdue said "While no amount of money will ever make up for the fact that government officials deprived North Carolinians, mostly women, of the possibility of having children—and officials did so, in most cases, without the victims' consent or against their will—we must do something. I support the task force's compensation proposal. I also agree that we should establish a permanent exhibit so that this shameful period is never forgotten. I look forward to reviewing the details of the task force's recommendations."

North Carolina's Republican controlled Senate removed such compensation for sterilization victims from the state's budget that the General Assembly passed after overriding the Governor's veto.

=== Funding education ===
Gov. Bev Perdue called on the General Assembly to temporarily restore a fraction of a penny to the state sales tax to reverse deep and unnecessary cuts to education.

=== Pre-K expansion ===
North Carolina Governor Bev Perdue issued Executive Order No. 128 authorizing the expansion of the NC Pre-K program to serve up to 6,300 additional children by January 1, 2013. An estimated 1,000 of those children can begin to be served immediately in Pre-K classrooms across the state.

"Through good economic times and bad, North Carolina's enduring commitment has been to educate our children. Now more than ever, as we sit poised for an economic recovery, any delay in preparing our kids to be tomorrow's workforce is simply unacceptable," Gov. Perdue said. "After the General Assembly cut early education programs by 20 percent, thousands of our youngest students were cut out of the Pre-K classroom. Today we can welcome many of them in."

=== Wilmington 10 pardons ===
Governor Perdue granted full pardons of innocence to the Wilmington 10 on December 31, 2012. "These convictions were tainted by naked racism and represent an ugly stain on North Carolina's criminal justice system that cannot be allowed to stand any longer," said Gov. Beverly Perdue. "Justice demands that this stain finally be removed." Perdue said that among the key evidence that led her to grant pardons of innocence were recently discovered notes from the prosecutor who picked the jury. The notes showed the prosecutor preferred white jurors who might be members of the Ku Klux Klan and one black juror was described as an "Uncle Tom type." Perdue also pointed to the federal court's ruling that the prosecutor knew his star witness lied on the witness stand. That witness and other witnesses recanted a few years after the trial.

== Personal life ==
She is an Episcopalian. Before entering public service, Perdue worked as a public school teacher, as director of geriatric services at a community hospital in her hometown of New Bern, and earned a Ph.D. in Education Administration.

Perdue lives in New Bern. She has been married to Robert Wendell Eaves Jr. since 1997 and has two grown sons, Garrett (b. 1976) and Emmett (b. 1979), from her previous marriage to Gary Perdue, which lasted from 1970 to 1994. She continues to use "Perdue" as her last name, using her current married name as her middle name.

=== Post-governorship ===
In Spring 2013, she served as a Resident Fellow at the Harvard Institute of Politics. Following her Harvard fellowship, she started an education consulting business.

In August 2013, Perdue became a Distinguished Visiting Fellow at Duke University's Sanford School of Public Policy, where she worked with faculty and students and also served as an adviser for Duke's Center for Child and Family Policy.

Perdue was named to the Governing Board of the National Assessment of Educational Progress in 2017 and re-appointed in 2021. She became the first woman in the board's history to serve as chair in 2018 and was re-elected to the chair for a second time in 2021.

== Electoral history ==
North Carolina gubernatorial election, 2008
Party	Candidate	Votes	%	±%
Democratic	Beverly Perdue	2,146,083	50.27%	
Republican	Pat McCrory	2,001,114	46.88%	
Libertarian	Michael Munger	121,585	2.85%	

North Carolina gubernatorial Democratic primary, 2008
Party	Candidate	Votes	%	±%
Democratic	Beverly Perdue	840,342	56.21%	
Democratic	Richard H. Moore	594.028	39.23%	
Democratic	Dennis Nielsen	60.628	4.06%	

North Carolina Lieutenant governor election, 2004
Party	Candidate	Votes	%	±%
Democratic	Beverly Perdue	1,888,397	56.6%	
Republican	Jim Snyder	1,453,705	42.8%	
Libertarian	Christopher Cole	56,368	1.7%	

North Carolina Lieutenant governor election, 2000
Party	Candidate	Votes	%	±%
Democratic	Beverly Perdue	1,500,206	52%	
Republican	Betsy Cochrane	1,315,825	46%	
Reform	Catherine Carter	50,352	2%	

North Carolina Lieutenant governor Democratic primary election, 2000
Party	Candidate	Votes	%	±%
Democratic	Beverly Perdue	329,183	64.1%	
Democratic	Ed Wilson	103,847	20.2%	
Democratic	Ronnie Ansley	55,622	10.8%	
Democratic	Joel Harbinson	25,179	4.9%	

North Carolina state Senate district 3 election, 1998
Party	Candidate	Votes	%	±%
Democratic	Beverly Perdue	24,767	60.1%	
Republican	David G. Hipps	16,414	39.9%	

All data is from the State Board of Elections.

== See also ==
- List of female governors in the United States
- List of female lieutenant governors in the United States

Party political offices
Preceded by Dennis A. Wicker	Democratic nominee for Lieutenant Governor of North Carolina; 2000, 2004	Succeeded by Walter Dalton
Preceded by Mike Easley	Democratic nominee for Governor of North Carolina; 2008	Succeeded by Walter Dalton
Political offices
Preceded by Dennis Wicker	Lieutenant Governor of North Carolina; 2001–2009	Succeeded by Walter Dalton
Preceded by Mike Easley	Governor of North Carolina; 2009–2013	Succeeded by Pat McCrory
U.S. order of precedence (ceremonial)
Preceded by Mike Easley as Former Governor	Order of precedence of the United States	Succeeded by Pat McCrory as Former Governor
