= Kristin Cooper =

American lawyer and First Lady of North Carolina

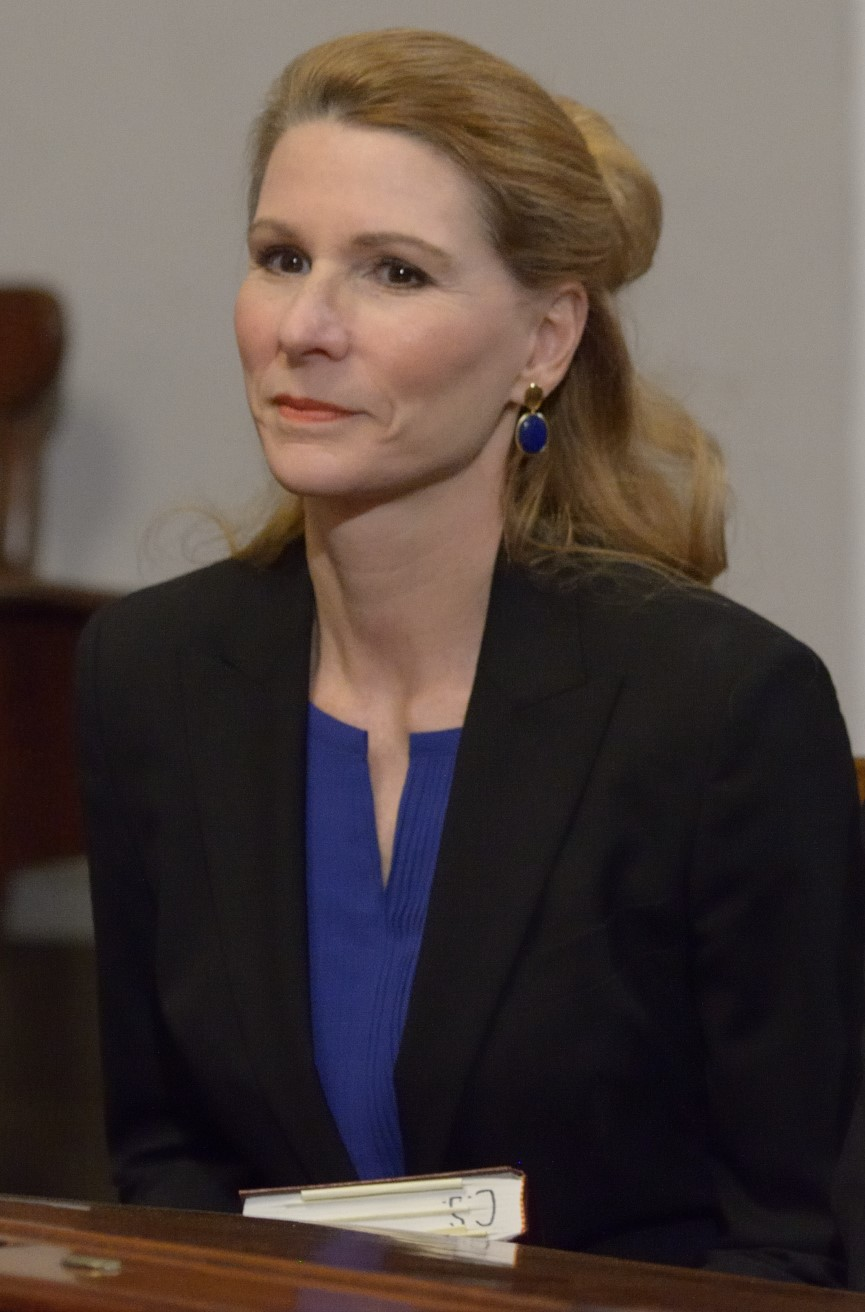
- Cooper in 2017

First Lady of North Carolina
- In role January 1, 2017 – January 1, 2025
- Governor: Roy Cooper
- Preceded by: Ann McCrory
- Succeeded by: Anna Harris Stein

Personal details
- Born: Kristin Bernhardt; July 19, 1956 (age 70) Oklahoma City, Oklahoma, U.S.
- Party: Democratic
- Spouse: Roy Cooper (m. 1992)
- Children: 3
- Education: University of Oklahoma (BA); Campbell University (JD)

Kristin Cooper (née Bernhardt; born July 19, 1956) is an American lawyer who served as First Lady of North Carolina from 2017 to 2025.

Raised in Oklahoma City, Cooper moved to North Carolina to earn a Juris Doctor from Campbell Law School in 1982. After working as a staff attorney with the North Carolina General Assembly, she married Democratic Party politician Roy Cooper. Since 2003, she has worked professionally as a guardian ad litem for foster children.

Roy Cooper was elected governor of North Carolina in 2016. Kristin Cooper, as the North Carolina First Lady, expanded the scope of her role and focused on issues such as child poverty, hunger, literacy, and abuse, as well as the arts.

== Early life and education ==
Cooper was born on July 19, 1956, to Geri Bernhardt, an artist, and Captain Samuel C. Bernhardt, a physician and Vietnam veteran who served with the Mobile Army Surgical Hospital during the Vietnam War. She grew up with three younger sisters in Oklahoma City, Oklahoma, and attended public schools.

She received her undergraduate degree from the University of Oklahoma, where she was a member of Alpha Phi. After moving to North Carolina, she graduated with a Juris Doctor from Campbell University's Norman Adrian Wiggins School of Law in 1982. She later said that law school represented the only possible educational path, besides becoming a professor, that combined her multipotential interests in reading, writing, and history.

== Legal career ==
Cooper worked as a staff attorney with the Oklahoma Legislature and the North Carolina General Assembly. She was a member of North Carolina's committee on inaugural ceremonies and, in 1997, attended the swearing-in as North Carolina Secretary of State of Campbell Law School classmate Elaine Marshall, who had become the first woman in North Carolina elected to statewide office. Two decades later, Cooper called Marshall her "favorite woman leader" and said that the "freezing January morning" inauguration was "very affecting".

Beginning in 2003, Cooper worked as a guardian ad litem representing foster children in Wake County, North Carolina. Cooper has said that neglect is the reason that children enter the foster system; furthermore, she said, neglect is often due to poverty, and poverty from illiteracy. She also said that children should be well-nourished when they go to school. As first lady, at an event on child hunger, she later said: "A problem I encountered with foster children is that the subsidy they receive simply doesn't allow them to buy enough food to eat. We would have to partner with local organizations and food pantries." Discussing children's well-being, she said: "So many of these issues are easier to address—and change is easier to implement—when they are young children rather than waiting until later."

== Personal life ==
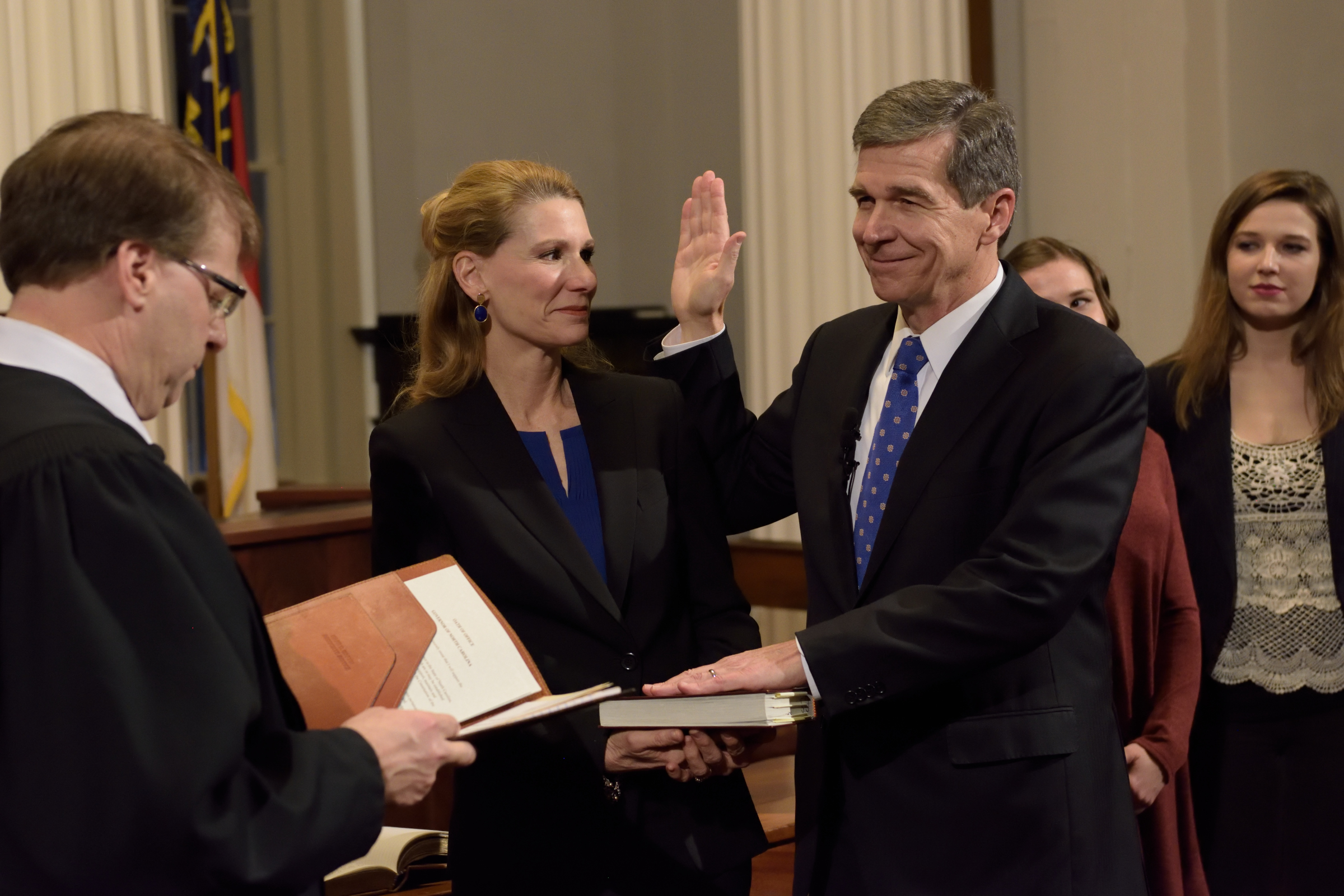
Cooper with her husband Roy being sworn in as governor of North Carolina

In a committee meeting about salvage titles at the North Carolina General Assembly, where she was practicing law, Kristin Bernhardt met Roy Asberry Cooper III (b. 1957), an attorney and state legislator. They later married and raised three children, Hilary, Claire, and Natalie, in Rocky Mount, Nash County. All three daughters graduated from the University of North Carolina at Chapel Hill.

Roy Cooper was first elected as a state representative and then was appointed to the state senate, where he eventually became the Democratic majority leader. From 2001 to 2017, he was North Carolina Attorney General. To live closer to the attorney general's office, the Cooper family moved to Raleigh, the state capital, after Hilary graduated from high school.

When they were living in Rocky Mount, Kristin Cooper and her three daughters had starred in a production of the musical Camelot; in Raleigh, she and Claire had lead roles in the plays The Diary of Anne Frank and The Best Christmas Pageant Ever. Cooper "has also wielded a paintbrush, a chainsaw, and a snow cone machine all in the name of art", and attended weekly drama lessons at Raleigh Little Theatre (RLT)—another trainee there described her "a witty gal" who "could laugh at herself, genuinely compliment others and self-deprecate with the best". Cooper served two years on the board of the North Carolina Arts Council, which provides grants across the state. In 2017, she entered her second year on the RLT board, and she was previously on the board of the North Raleigh Arts and Creative Theater (NRACT). As first lady, Cooper moderated a panel discussion with female Wake County youth leaders after RLT's premiere of Grace for President in October 2017.

Cooper has described herself as an amateur gardener and birdwatcher; she said she cultivated an interest in birding during the 1996 extreme weather event that snowed her in with three children, "a big window and a pair of binoculars and a field guide". In 2017, the first lady and the state Audubon society organized a renovation of the Executive Mansion's garden. Cooper has also led a knitting circle, a hobby she said her great-grandmother enjoyed. The first family has several pets: rescued cats Adelaide and Alexei and Hilary's dog Ben. Their dog Chloe died in May 2017 at age sixteen. Their praying mantis, Fred, died in June 2017 and was replaced by an orchid mantis Daisy.

== First Lady of North Carolina ==
In 2016, Roy Cooper ran for Governor of North Carolina and was elected over Republican incumbent Pat McCrory. He assumed the governorship on January 1, 2017. Kristin Cooper held a Bible under the new governor's hand when he was ceremonially sworn in on January 6. Her blue floor-length taffeta gown for the inaugural ball, designed by C.J. Bostrom of Charlotte, was by custom donated to the North Carolina Museum of History.

Writer Leah Whitt described Cooper's character as first lady as "a blend of the proper Southern hostess and a rebel". Cooper set a goal to make meaningful visits to all 100 counties of North Carolina by 2020 and, as she has said, to bring advice from those visits back to her husband. In an interview with Spectrum News in September 2017, the first lady was asked about her legacy. She said: "I hope they remember that I genuinely care about this state. ... I don't want to be remembered as somebody who stayed up in Raleigh and went to parties. I want to meet people, and see what interests them ... and what challenges they face. I am finding out that we are more alike than different." In 2017, she made visits to 27 counties and planned to see 25 more in 2018, at every stop taking questions from local officials and the public.

As directed by Cooper, the first lady's administrative office expanded its scope to draw attention to issues such as the arts, foster care, and child literacy, hunger, abuse and neglect. Cooper's general goal as first lady has been to address child poverty; as part of this mission, she has visited public schools, participated in story-time, observed innovative programs, and supported the creation of gardens. In Alamance County, she said: "While [political] parties may disagree on spending to support families, things like encouraging kids to read and teaching parents how to parent costs practically nothing, and has a huge impact."

Cooper has said that children's literacy can begin to be developed easily when their parents read to them, such as through the program Reach Out and Read. In her first month as first lady, Cooper supported and was a celebrity reader at the launch of the Wake Up and Read book drive for low-income children in Wake County. She has praised Dolly Parton's Imagination Library, which sends a new book every month to children under five, and for which the General Assembly allocated $3.5 million in 2017. In November 2017, she and celebrity chef Vivian Howard hosted a lunch in Kinston to raise funds for the program.

The first lady joined the Food Bank of Central and Eastern North Carolina to establish the Stop Summer Hunger program, which helps sustain about 300,000 children when school is out of session. She has visited several food service sites in Advance and the Triangle, and has seen several North Carolina public schools that provide breakfast to students.

In August 2018, along Interstate 95, Cooper commemorated the 50th anniversary of North Carolina's highway welcome centers. At the event, the first lady said, "A big smile and a warm welcome continue to be the hallmark of North Carolina's famous hospitality."

Honorary titles
| Preceded by Ann McCrory | First Lady of North Carolina; 2017–2024 | Succeeded by Anna Harris Stein |
