= Ann McCrory =

First Lady of North Carolina

First Lady of North Carolina
- In role January 5, 2013 – January 1, 2017
- Governor: Pat McCrory
- Preceded by: Bob Eaves (as First Gentleman)
- Succeeded by: Kristin Bernhardt Cooper

First Lady of Charlotte
- In role December 7, 1995 – December 7, 2009
- Mayor: Pat McCrory
- Preceded by: Judy Allen Vinroot
- Succeeded by: Samara Ryder Foxx

Personal details
- Born: Ann Gordon; November 23, 1956 (age 69) Maxwell Air Force Base, Montgomery, Alabama, U.S.
- Party: Republican
- Spouse: Pat McCrory (m. 1988)
- Education: Limestone College (BA); Winthrop University (MA)
- Occupation: counselor, human resources manager

Ann Gordon McCrory (formerly Sturgis; born 23 November 1956) is an American human resources manager who, as the wife of Pat McCrory, was the first lady of Charlotte, North Carolina from 1995 to 2009 and first lady of North Carolina from 2013 to 2017. McCrory led a fairly private life during her time as first lady, and rarely made public appearances. She has worked as the vice president of human resources for YMCA and as a regional human resources manager at Cigna.

== Early life and education ==
McCrory was born on November 23, 1956, at the Maxwell Air Force Base in Montgomery, Alabama. She is the daughter of Colonel William Price Gordon, Jr., a retired United States Air Force officer and economics professor, and Barbara Ann Binnicker Gordon. Her paternal grandfather, Rev. William Price Gordon, Sr., was a Methodist minister and chaplain with the United Service Organizations. She attended Gaffney High School in Gaffney, South Carolina in the 1970s, where she was a classmate of the actress Andie MacDowell. She was a member of the school's Spanish club, Bible club, and the cheerleading squad.

She received a bachelor's degree in education and history from Limestone College, where her father was a faculty member. She was a member of Limetsone's student senate and was historian of her sorority. In 1976 she was a junior attendant of the college's annual May Court. She went on to earn a master's degree in counseling from Winthrop University.

== Career ==
McCrory worked as the vice president of human resources for YMCA and as a regional human resources manager at Cigna.

From 1995 to 2009, McCrory was the first lady of Charlotte, North Carolina, through her husband's seven terms as mayor. He had previously served three terms as a city councilman.

She assumed the role of first lady of North Carolina and moved into the North Carolina Executive Mansion upon her husband's inauguration as governor in 2013. She and her husband were the first Republicans to serve as First Lady and Governor of North Carolina in twenty years. Throughout her time as first lady, McCrory kept a fairly low profile and refused to be interviewed by news and media outlets. She rarely made public appearances and declined to host the Junior League's traditional First Lady's Luncheon in Raleigh in January 2013. Her first main public appearance was on November 7, 2012, at the Westin Hotel in Charlotte, where she introduced her husband as North Carolina's next governor. In January 2013, after refusing to do the Junior League luncheon, McCrory attended an event at the Durham Rescue Mission in Durham, North Carolina to serve a catered lunch with women and children served by the facility.

One of McCrory's main projects as first lady was to regulate puppy mills in North Carolina. She introduced a bill to the North Carolina State Legislature in 2013 which failed to pass. During the debate in the North Carolina House of Representatives, where McCrory was present in the visitor's gallery, Rep. Michael Speciale of New Bern ridiculed her proposed bill requiring breeders of a certain size to adhere to standards including exercising dogs and practicing humane euthanasia. Speciale said, "Exercise on a daily basis – if I kick him across the floor, is that daily exercise? 'Euthanasia performed humanely' – so I should choose the ax or the baseball bat?" The debate was seen as an insult to the governor and first lady.

In 2015, McCrory and her husband released a joint statement regarding the death of Jimmy Goins, Chairman of the Lumbee Tribe of North Carolina.

Governor McCrory stated in an interview in December 2019 that moving back to Charlotte was hard on him and Ann McCrory, due to threats they reportedly received while he was in office.

== Personal life ==
In 1983, while living in Columbia, South Carolina, McCrory divorced her first husband and resumed use of her maiden name. She met her second husband, Pat McCrory, at a human resources convention in Atlanta. They married in 1988. They live in the Myers Park neighborhood in Charlotte.

In 2017 she and her husband purchased a 2,800 square-foot waterfront vacation house on Lake James for $650,000.

Honorary titles
Preceded by Bob Eaves (as First Gentleman)	First Lady of North Carolina; 2013–2017	Succeeded by Kristin Cooper
