= Leslie Cooley Dismukes =

American lawyer and government official

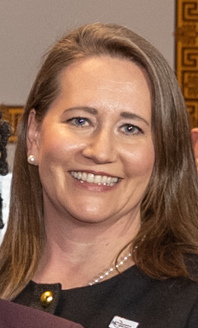
- Dismukes in 2025

North Carolina Secretary of Adult Correction
- Incumbent
- Assumed office January 1, 2025
- Governor: Josh Stein
- Preceded by: Todd Ishee

Personal details
- Children: 1
- Education: University of North Carolina at Chapel Hill; Duke University
- Occupation: lawyer

Leslie Cooley Dismukes is an American lawyer and politician. She was appointed to the North Carolina Cabinet in January 2025 by Governor Josh Stein. She is the first woman to serve as Secretary of the North Carolina Department of Adult Correction.

== Early life and education ==
Dismukes grew up on the Eastern Shore of Maryland. She graduated of the University of North Carolina at Chapel Hill. She earned a juris doctor from Duke University School of Law.

== Career ==
She worked as a prosecutor, serving as an assistant district attorney at the Mecklenburg County District Attorney's Office in Charlotte, North Carolina. She then served as Chief of the Criminal Division at the United States Attorney's Office for the Eastern District of North Carolina and as the Criminal Bureau Chief at the North Carolina Department of Justice.

Dismukes was appointed by Democratic Governor Josh Stein to succeed Todd Ishee as the Secretary of the North Carolina Department of Adult Correction, assuming office on January 1, 2025. She was confirmed by the North Carolina Senate's Judiciary Committee in June 2025, following a motion to confirm her by Republican Senator Warren Daniel. She is the first woman to head the department. Dismukes appointed North Carolina First Lady Anna Harris Stein to the North Carolina Joint Reentry Council.

== Personal life ==
Dismukes lives in Raleigh, North Carolina with her husband, an officer in the Cary Police Department, and daughter.
