= Mary P. Easley =

First Lady of North Carolina

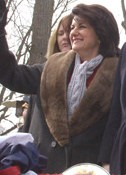
- Easley at her husband's inauguration as Governor in 2001

First Lady of North Carolina
- In role January 6, 2001 – January 10, 2009
- Governor: Mike Easley
- Preceded by: Carolyn Hunt
- Succeeded by: Bob Eaves (as First Gentleman)

Personal details
- Born: Mary Pipines
- Party: Democratic
- Spouse: Mike Easley
- Children: Michael F. Easley Jr.
- Parent(s): James Pipines; Ann Pipines
- Education: Wake Forest University (BA, JD)
- Occupation: attorney, professor, academic administrator

Mary Pipines Easley is an American attorney, academic, and former university administrator who, as the wife of Governor Mike Easley, served as First Lady of North Carolina from 2001 to 2009. A member of the Democratic Party, she was the first woman to maintain her career while serving as first lady and the first Catholic and Greek American to serve in this position.

As first lady, Easley championed educational, artistic, and public health initiatives in North Carolina. She focused on promoting childhood immunization, access to public libraries, and teacher recruitment across the state. An avid arts patron, she partnered with the North Carolina Museum of Art to help procure funding and bring in international exhibits, including exhibits on Monet and Auguste Rodin. Before serving as first lady, Easley was one of the first women to serve as an assistant district attorney in eastern North Carolina.

She served on the faculty at North Carolina Central University and North Carolina State University, teaching law and police management and running a public safety center. In 2009, she and her husband became the subjects of a financial scandal regarding the misuse of campaign funds. She was later fired from North Carolina State University after it was revealed that she had obtained her job, with an annual salary of $175,000, with the help of her husband's influence as governor.

== Early life and education ==
Easley is the daughter of James and Ann Pipines. She has a sister, Irene. Easley is of Greek descent and the granddaughter of Greek immigrants. Raised in Wyckoff, New Jersey, she graduated from Ramapo High School in 1968.

Easley attended Wake Forest University to study political science, graduating magna cum laude in 1972. She was inducted into Phi Beta Kappa while an undergraduate. In 1975, she obtained a J.D. degree from the Wake Forest University School of Law, where she was a member of Phi Delta Phi.

== Career ==
After graduating from law school at Wake Forest, Easley worked as an assistant district attorney for Pender and New Hanover counties, working out of the office in Burgaw. She was among the first women to serve as an assistant district attorney in eastern North Carolina. Before moving to Raleigh, Easley ran a private law firm in Southport, North Carolina.

During her husband's unsuccessful campaign for the United States Senate in 1990, she and her husband were accused of breaching ethical standards since she represented drug offenders whom her husband's office prosecuted.

Easley worked as a law professor at North Carolina Central University, teaching trial practice, trial advocacy, and appellate advocacy. She also supervised law students representing criminal defendants through the university's clinic and was a faculty member for the National Institute of Trial Advocacy's southeast region. Easley helped lead a course in police management at North Carolina State University, joining the administration there in 2005 to run the university's Center for Public Safety Leadership. She was hired at North Carolina State University as an executive-in-residence and a senior lecturer, running a program for emergency rescue workers and coordinating law education initiatives. She built the Millenium Seminar series at North Carolina State, bringing in guest speakers including David Gergen, Robert Reich, Charlie Rose, Senator Lindsey Graham, Myles Brand, Bill Bradley, and Donna Shalala.

== First Lady of North Carolina ==
Easley became First Lady of North Carolina in 2001 when her husband was elected as the 72nd Governor of North Carolina. She was the first woman to maintain a separate career while serving as First Lady and the first Catholic to serve in the role.

As First Lady, Easley promoted the arts and education and led a campaign against underage drinking called The First Ladies' Initiative to Keep Children Alcohol Free. She established initiatives in teacher recruitment and infant immunization, focusing on North Carolinians who speak English as a second language. Easley served as the spokesperson for McDonald's Immunize for Healthy Lives Campaign, speaking to groups around the state about the importance of immunizing children promptly. Easley led the North Carolina Institute of Medicine's Latino Health Task Force, a partnership between the institute and El Pueblo, Inc., as honorary chair.

In 2002, she served as the spokesperson for the State Library of North Carolina's The Very Best Place to Start initiative, going on a state-wide speaking tour to ensure library access for children in North Carolina.

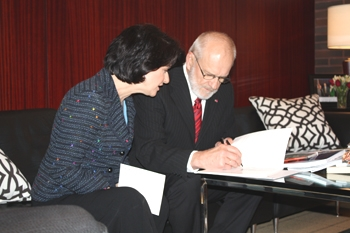
Easley with Estonian artist Jüri Arrak in 2008.

She volunteered at the North Carolina Museum of Art, recruiting international exhibits, organizing events, and assisting in fundraising efforts. In 2007, Easley went to France as part of a cultural exchange that brought a Monet exhibit to the museum. She also traveled as part of a cultural delegation to Estonia and St. Petersburg, Russia, meeting with famous artists, including Jüri Arrak, and helping the museum receive loaned art from the Hermitage Museum. Through her cultural exchanges, she obtained a $35 million collection of Auguste Rodin's work and assisted in raising funds to construct a new Greek Art wing for the museum.

Easley commissioned a painting of the North Carolina Executive Mansion, titled The Governor's Mansion, by the artist William Mangum.

=== Financial scandal ===
News broke that the total cost of Easley's trips to Europe was $109,000. Her expenses, which paid for an interrogee of nine people, included hotels, meals, transportation, and tickets to the Mariinsky Ballet. She became the target of editorial writers, radio hosts, and bloggers who questioned the value of her trips. Her husband and other state officials stated that her trip to France brought the state an economic benefit of more than $20 million from the Monet exhibit and that the trip to Russia and Estonia could potentially produce a similar result. They argued her presence in the international delegation as a first lady helped impress foreign art officials.

She received an eighty-percent pay increase for her job at North Carolina State University. The raise she received was $90,300- a much larger raise than that received by other academic administrators, providing her an annual salary of $170,000. She was criticized by the North Carolina State Employees Association members, who claimed she was given preferential treatment as the governor's wife. The governor responded by saying that people were making an issue of Easley's raise because of her gender. In June 2009, the university's board of trustees voted to terminate Easley's contract after newly released documents indicating that her husband was involved in her hiring. She began a formal grievance process following her termination. Easley agreed not to sue the university for severing its contract with her. In return, she received an additional $40,000 in annual pension benefits.

Towards the end of her term, she and her husband were involved in a financial scandal related to the misuse of campaign funds. They were the subject of an investigation by a North Carolina grand jury and the North Carolina State Board of Elections, which looked into the couple's relationships with land dealers, car dealers, and the use of government aircraft for personal vacations.

== Personal life ==
Easley was introduced to Mike Easley, then an assistant prosecutor, by her district attorney. They married in 1980. Easley and her husband lived in an oceanfront house in Brunswick County before moving to Raleigh when her husband was elected as the North Carolina Attorney General. She and her husband live in Charlotte and have a summer home in Southport. They have one son, Michael F. Easley Jr.

Easley is a practicing Catholic.

Honorary titles
Preceded by Carolyn Hunt	First Lady of North Carolina; 2001–2009	Succeeded by Bob Eaves (as First Gentleman)
