= Anna Harris Stein =

First Lady of North Carolina (since 2025)

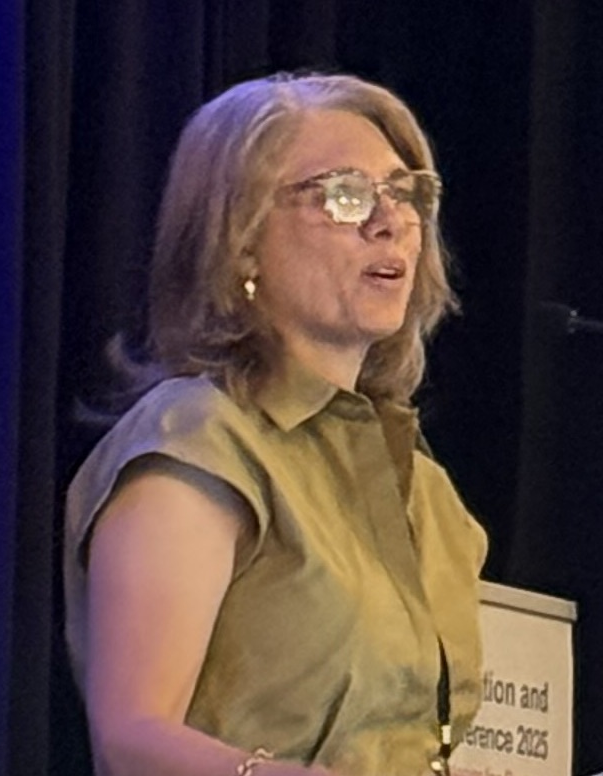
- Stein in 2025

First Lady of North Carolina
- Incumbent
- Assumed role January 1, 2025
- Governor: Josh Stein
- Preceded by: Kristin Cooper

Personal details
- Born: Anna Harris Elkin, North Carolina, U.S.
- Party: Democratic
- Spouse: Josh Stein
- Children: 3
- Education: University of North Carolina at Chapel Hill (BS, JD, MPH)
- Occupation: lawyer, public health official

Anna Harris Stein (née Harris) is an American lawyer and public health official. Between 2011 and 2024, she worked as a legal advisor for the North Carolina Department of Health and Human Services. On January 1, 2025, as the wife of Governor Josh Stein, she became the first lady of North Carolina. In April 2025, she was appointed to the North Carolina Joint Reentry Council by the North Carolina Secretary of Adult Correction.

== Early life and education ==
Stein was born in Elkin, North Carolina, to David Harris and Patty Harris. She lived in Greenville as an infant, while her parents attended East Carolina University, and then moved to Winston-Salem when she was seven years old.

Stein graduated from Richard J. Reynolds High School in Winston-Salem. She earned a bachelor's degree in psychology and a Juris Doctor degree from the University of North Carolina at Chapel Hill. She later went back to Chapel Hill to earn a master's degree in public health.

== Career and public life ==
After graduating from law school, Stein clerked on the North Carolina Court of Appeals for Judge Joe John. She later clerked for Judge Robin E. Hudson on the court and joined Hudson in private practice.

Stein began working as legal specialist with the North Carolina Division of Public Health's Chronic Disease and Injury Section, a division within the North Carolina Department of Health and Human Services, in 2011. The division she advises is focused on tobacco-free living, health eating, active living and injury prevention policies. From 2012 to 2014, she worked on the Community Transformation Grant Project. She later served on the Injury and Violence Prevention Branch's opioid overdose prevention team. In October 2023, Stein switched to a part-time role within the department, focusing on health care toolkits for jails and detention centers.

In August 2024, North Carolina lieutenant governor Mark Robinson alleged that Stein was "deeply embedded" in the North Carolina Department of Health and Human Services, which was investigating a nonprofit run by Robinson's wife, Second Lady Yolanda Hill Robinson, for mismanaging funds provided by the Child and Adult Care Food Program. Robinson falsely claimed that Stein, whose husband, Josh Stein, was running against Robinson as the Democratic nominee in the 2024 North Carolina gubernatorial election, was targeting him because of the election. A spokesperson for the Department of Health and Human Services confirmed that Stein was not involved in any of the investigations against the Robinson's business.

On January 1, 2025, Stein's husband was sworn in as the governor of North Carolina, making her the first lady of North Carolina. Her husband is the state's first Jewish governor. She held the Hebrew Bible during her husband's oath of office.

Stein was the guest of honor at the Junior League of Raleigh's North Carolina First Lady's Luncheon, held on January 10, 2025, at the North Carolina Museum of Art.

In April 2025, Stein was appointed to the North Carolina Joint Reentry Council by North Carolina Secretary of Adult Correction Leslie Cooley Dismukes. The council focuses on the rehabilitation and reentry into society of formerly incarcerated people.

== Personal life ==
She is married to Josh Stein, whom she met in 1993 while interning for North Carolina Attorney General Mike Easley. They have three children. The family are members of Temple Beth Or, a Reform synagogue in Raleigh.

Honorary titles
| Preceded by Kristin Cooper | First Lady of North Carolina; 2025–present | Succeeded by Incumbent |
