= 2000 North Carolina lieutenant gubernatorial election =

2000 North Carolina lieutenant governor election
- November 7, 2000
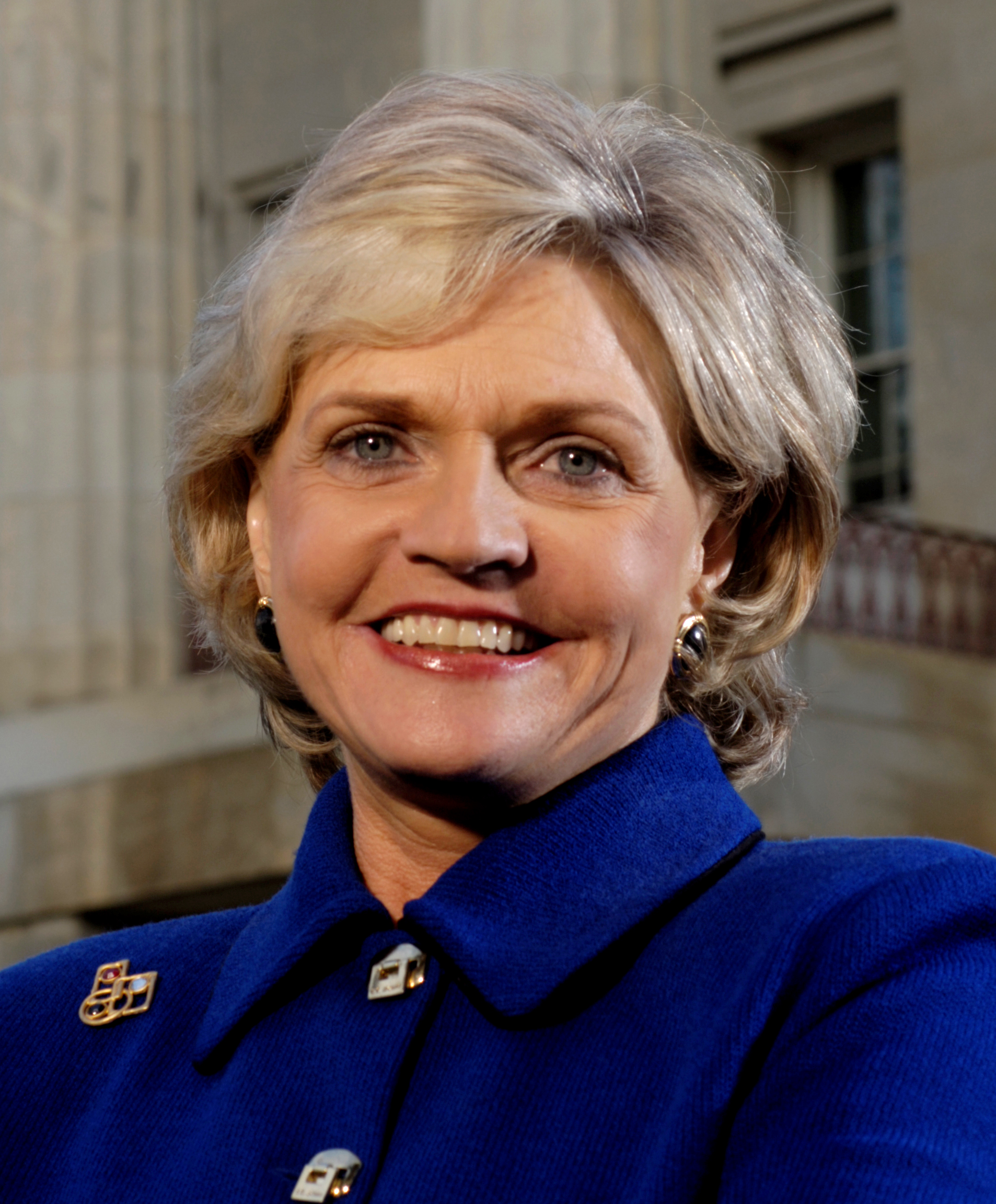

Nominee	Bev Perdue	Betsy Cochrane
Party	Democratic	Republican
Popular vote	1,500,206	1,315,825
Percentage	52.3%	45.9%
- County results Perdue: 40–50% 50–60% 60–70% 70–80% Cochrane: 40–50% 50–60% 60–70% 70–80%
Lieutenant Governor before election
Dennis Wicker
Democratic
Elected Lieutenant Governor
Bev Perdue
Democratic

The 2000 North Carolina lieutenant gubernatorial election was held on 7 November 2000, as part of the elections to the Council of State. North Carolina also held a gubernatorial election on the same day, but the offices of Governor and Lieutenant Governor are elected independently.

The election was won by Democrat Beverly Perdue, who succeeded fellow Democrat Dennis A. Wicker. In the general election, Perdue defeated Republican former state senator Betsy Cochrane by 52% to 46%.

== Primaries ==
=== Democratic primary ===
2000 North Carolina lieutenant governor Democratic primary election
Party	Candidate	Votes	%	±%
Democratic	Bev Perdue	329,183	64.04	
Democratic	Ed Wilson	103,847	20.21	
Democratic	Ronnie Ansley	55,622	10.82	
Democratic	Joel Harbinson	25,179	4.90	
Turnout		513,831		

=== Republican primary ===
2000 North Carolina lieutenant governor Republican primary election
Party	Candidate	Votes	%	±%
Republican	Betsy Cochrane	202,906	72.15	
Republican	Andy Nilsson	78,333	27.85	
Turnout		281,239		

== General election ==
2000 North Carolina lieutenant governor election
Party	Candidate	Votes	%	±%
Democratic	Bev Perdue	1,500,206	52.34	
Republican	Betsy Cochrane	1,315,825	45.91	
Reform	Catherine Carter	50,352	1.76	
Turnout		2,866,383		
Democratic hold		Swing		
