= 2004 North Carolina lieutenant gubernatorial election =

- November 2, 2004
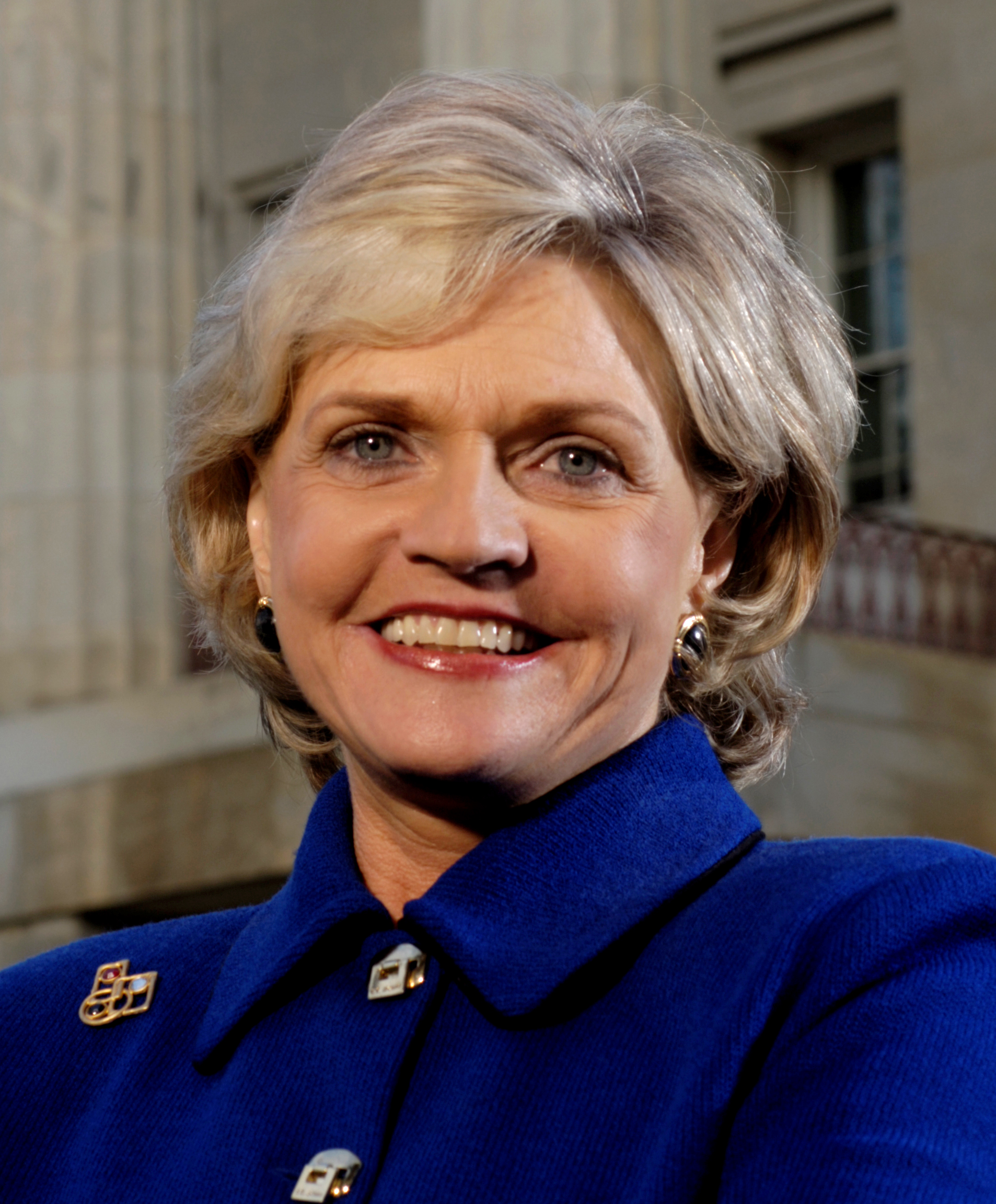

Nominee	Bev Perdue	Jim Snyder
Party	Democratic	Republican
Popular vote	1,888,397	1,453,705
Percentage	55.6%	42.8%
- County results Perdue: 50–60% 60–70% 70–80% Snyder: 40–50% 50–60% 60–70%
Lieutenant Governor before election
Bev Perdue
Democratic
Elected Lieutenant Governor
Bev Perdue
Democratic

The 2004 North Carolina lieutenant governor election was held on November 2, 2004, as part of the elections to the Council of State. North Carolina also held a gubernatorial election on the same day, but the offices of Governor and Lieutenant Governor are elected independently. Incumbent Bev Perdue was re-elected with 55% of the vote.

== Candidates ==
=== Democrats ===
- Curtis R. Hert, Jr.
- Bev Perdue – incumbent lieutenant governor

=== Republicans ===
- Timothy Cook – chemist
- Jim Snyder – attorney, former State Representative, Former Davidson County Republican Party chair, and candidate for US Senate in 2002
- Thomas Stith, III – Durham City Councilman

=== Libertarians ===
- Chris Cole

== Result ==
2004 North Carolina lieutenant governor election
Party	Candidate	Votes	%	±%
Democratic	Bev Perdue (incumbent)	1,888,397	55.57	
Republican	Jim Snyder	1,453,705	42.78	
Libertarian	Chris Cole	56,368	1.66	
Turnout		3,398,470		
Democratic hold		Swing		
