= James Snyder Jr. =

American author, attorney and politician (1945–2021)

Member of the North Carolina House of Representatives from the 31st district
- In office 1971–1973 Serving with Joe H. Hege, Jr.
- Preceded by: J. Eugene Snyder
- Succeeded by: Austin A. Mitchell; Samuel Kenneth Owen

Personal details
- Born: James Eugene Snyder Jr. June 30, 1945 Davidson County, North Carolina, U.S.
- Died: September 12, 2021 (aged 76) Lexington, North Carolina, U.S.
- Party: Republican
- Spouse: Sandra
- Children: 2
- Education: Wake Forest University (BA, JD)
- Occupation: Author, attorney, politician
- Website: Official website

James Eugene "Jim" Snyder Jr. (June 30, 1945 – September 12, 2021) was an American author, attorney and politician. He was a member of the Republican Party.

== Early life and education ==
Snyder was born on June 30, 1945, in Davidson County, North Carolina. He earned a bachelor's degree in history from Wake Forest University in 1967 and a J.D. degree there in 1970. While a student, Snyder played on the Wake Forest basketball team under Coach Bones McKinney.

== Political career ==
In 1971, Snyder served in the North Carolina House of Representatives, filling the unexpired term of his father who had died. He later chaired the Davidson County Republican Party.

In 2002, Snyder was the only major challenger to Elizabeth Dole in the Republican primary for United States Senate, garnering about 14 percent of the vote. He ran for Lieutenant Governor of North Carolina in 2004, winning the primary over 2nd place Tim Cook, but losing the general election to Beverly Perdue. In 2008, Snyder filed to run for Lieutenant Governor again. He was endorsed by former Governor James Holshouser, but was defeated by state Sen. Robert Pittenger in the May 2008 primary.

== Legacy and death ==
Snyder was a prolific writer in corporation and insurance law, but also published a novel and a book of prayers. Snyder died on September 12, 2021, in his Lexington, North Carolina, home at age 76.

North Carolina House of Representatives
Preceded by J. Eugene Snyder	Member of the North Carolina House of Representatives from the 31st district 1971–1973; Served alongside: Joe H. Hege, Jr.	Succeeded by Austin A. Mitchell; Samuel Kenneth Owen
Party political offices
Preceded by Betsy L. Cochrane	Republican nominee for Lieutenant Governor of North Carolina; 2004	Succeeded by Robert Pittenger
