= 1976 North Carolina gubernatorial election =

- November 2, 1976
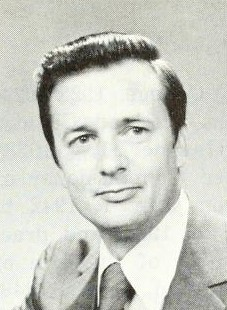

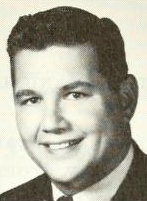
Nominee	Jim Hunt	David Flaherty
Party	Democratic	Republican
Popular vote	1,081,293	564,102
Percentage	64.99%	33.90%
- County results Hunt: 50–60% 60–70% 70–80% 80–90% >90% Flaherty: 50–60% 60–70%
Governor before election
James Holshouser
Republican
Elected Governor
Jim Hunt
Democratic

The 1976 North Carolina gubernatorial election was held on November 2, 1976. Democratic nominee Jim Hunt defeated Republican nominee David T. Flaherty with 64.99% of the vote.

This election marked the last time an incumbent North Carolina governor was ineligible to run for reelection to a second term before the adoption of an amendment allowing such runs.

== Primary elections ==
Primary elections were held on August 17, 1976.

=== Democratic primary ===
==== Candidates ====
- Jim Hunt, incumbent Lieutenant Governor
- Edward O'Herron Jr., chairman of Eckerd Drugs and former member of the North Carolina House of Representatives
- George Wood, former member of the North Carolina Senate
- Thomas Strickland, incumbent member of the North Carolina Senate
- Andy Barker, incumbent Mayor of Love Valley, North Carolina

17.6% of the voting age population participated in the Democratic primary.

==== Results ====
Democratic primary results
Party	Candidate	Votes	%
Democratic	Jim Hunt	362,102	53.41
Democratic	Edward O'Herron Jr.	157,815	23.28
Democratic	George Wood	121,673	17.95
Democratic	Thomas E. Strickland	31,338	4.62
Democratic	Andy Barker	5,003	0.74
Total votes		677,931	100.00

=== Republican primary ===
==== Candidates ====
- David Flaherty, former State Senator
- Coy Privette, Baptist pastor
- Jacob F. Alexander, former North Carolina Secretary of Transportation
- Wallace McCall

3% of the voting age population participated in the Republican primary.

==== Results ====
Republican primary results
Party	Candidate	Votes	%
Republican	David Flaherty	57,663	49.77
Republican	Coy Privette	37,573	32.43
Republican	Jacob F. Alexander	16,149	13.94
Republican	Wallace McCall	4,467	3.86
Total votes		115,852	100.00

Republican primary runoff results
Party	Candidate	Votes	%
Republican	David T. Flaherty	45,661	60.50
Republican	Coy Privette	29,810	39.50
Total votes		75,471	100.00

== General election ==
=== Candidates ===
Major party candidates

- Jim Hunt, Democratic
- David T. Flaherty, Republican

Other candidates

- Herbert F. Seawell Jr., American
- Arlan K. Andrews, Libertarian

=== Results ===
1976 North Carolina gubernatorial election
Party	Candidate	Votes	%	±%
Democratic	Jim Hunt	1,081,293	64.99%	
Republican	David T. Flaherty	564,102	33.90%	
American	Herbert F. Seawell Jr.	13,604	0.82%	
Libertarian	Arlan K. Andrews	4,764	0.29%	
Majority		517,201		
Turnout		1,663,763		
Democratic gain from Republican		Swing		

== Works cited ==
- Steed, Robert; Moreland, Laurence; Baker, Tod, eds. (1980). Party Politics in the South. Praeger Publishers. ISBN 0030565863.
