= 1992 North Carolina gubernatorial election =

- November 3, 1992
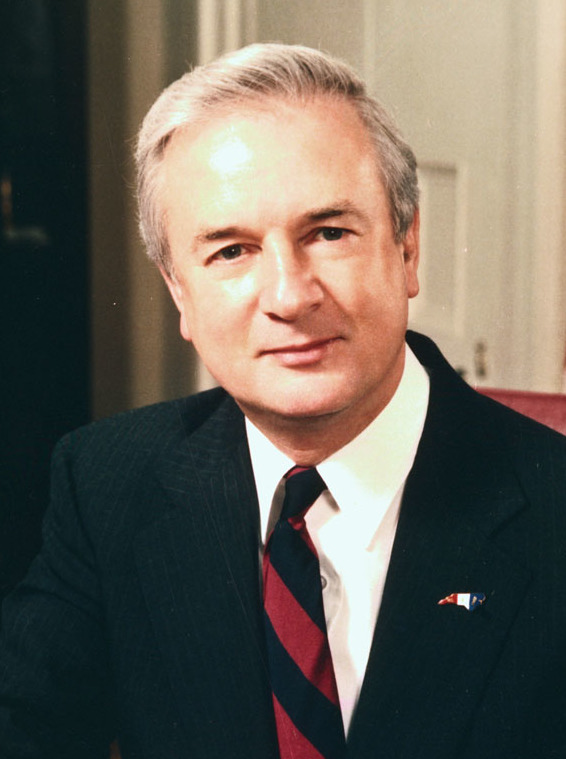

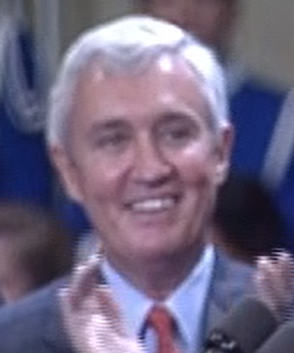
Nominee	Jim Hunt	Jim Gardner
Party	Democratic	Republican
Popular vote	1,368,246	1,121,955
Percentage	52.72%	43.23%
- County results Hunt: 40–50% 50–60% 60–70% 70–80% Gardner: 40–50% 50–60% 60–70%
Governor before election
James G. Martin
Republican
Elected Governor
Jim Hunt
Democratic

The 1992 North Carolina gubernatorial election was held on November 3, 1992. Incumbent Governor James G. Martin was unable to run for a third consecutive term due to term limits, and his Lieutenant Governor, Jim Gardner, was chosen to replace him as the Republican nominee. Gardner had also been the nominee in a previous gubernatorial election twenty four years earlier. Former Governor Jim Hunt decided to seek his third term as the Democratic nominee. The race became one of the nastiest and most talked about races in the country, with Hunt winning a third term easily over Gardner and Libertarian nominee Scott McLaughlin.

== Republican primary ==
=== Candidates ===
- Gary M. Dunn
- Jim Gardner, lieutenant governor of North Carolina and former U.S. representative from Rocky Mount
- Ruby Hooper, former deputy secretary of the North Carolina Department of Human Resources and candidate for governor in 1984

=== Results ===
1992 Republican gubernatorial primary
Party	Candidate	Votes	%
Republican	Jim Gardner	215,528	81.96%
Republican	Ruby T. Hooper	26,179	9.96%
Republican	Gary M. Dunn	21,256	8.08%
Total votes		262,963	100.00%

== Democratic primary ==
=== Candidates ===
- Jim Hunt, former governor of North Carolina
- Lacy Thornburg, North Carolina attorney general and former state representative
- Marcus W. Williams

=== Results ===
1992 Democratic gubernatorial primary
Party	Candidate	Votes	%
Democratic	Jim Hunt	459,300	65.46%
Democratic	Lacy Thornburg	188,806	26.91%
Democratic	Marcus W. Williams	25,660	3.66%
Total votes		673,766	100.00%

== General election ==
=== Candidates ===
- Jim Gardner, lieutenant governor of North Carolina and former U.S. representative from Rocky Mount (Republican)
- Jim Hunt, former governor of North Carolina (Democratic)
- Scott McLaughlin (Libertarian)

=== Results ===
1992 North Carolina gubernatorial election
Party	Candidate	Votes	%	±%
Democratic	Jim Hunt	1,368,246	52.72	
Republican	Jim Gardner	1,121,955	43.23	▼9.49
Libertarian	Scott McLaughlin	104,983	4.05	
Total votes		2,595,184	100.00%	
