= 1984 North Carolina gubernatorial election =

- November 6, 1984
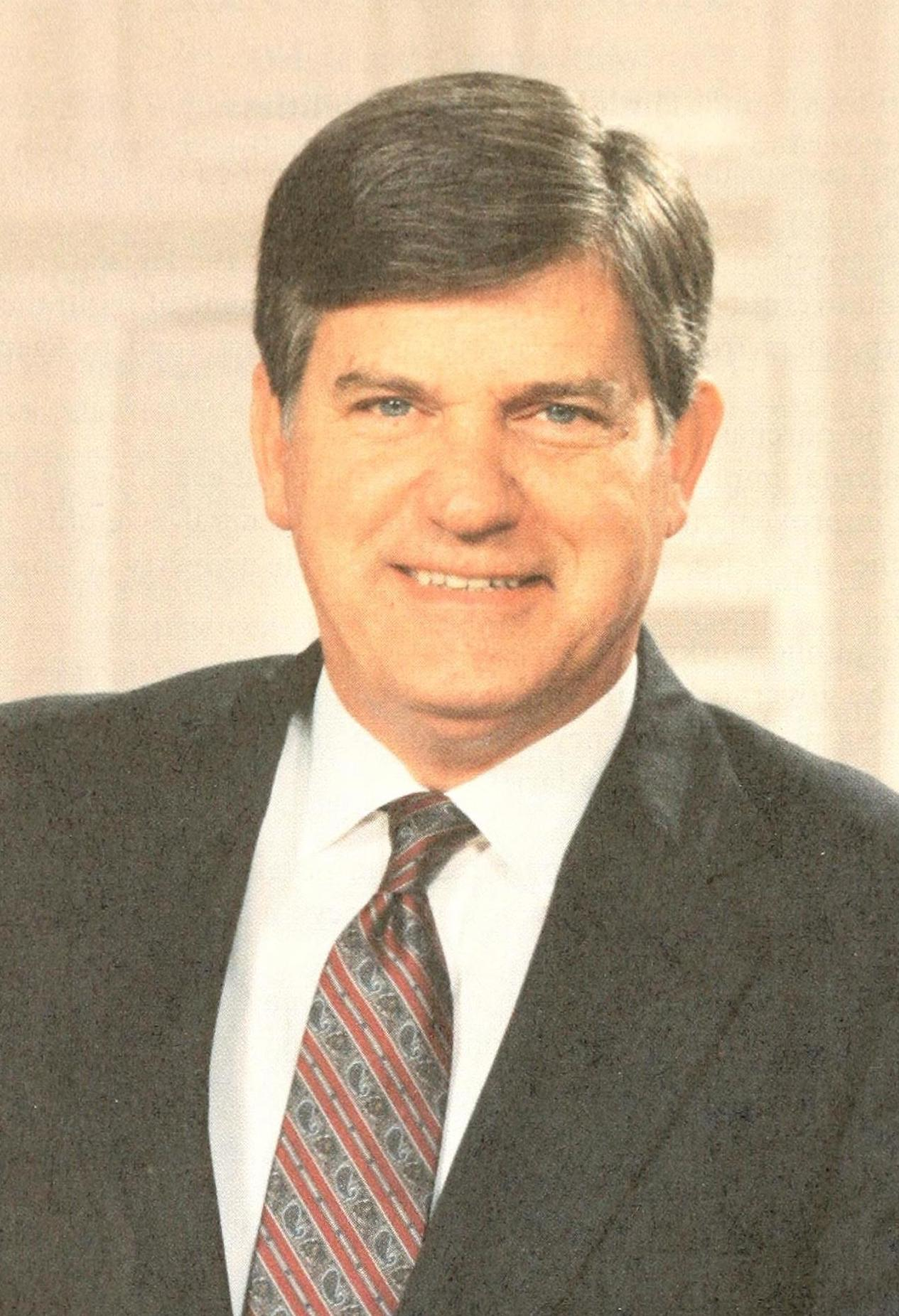

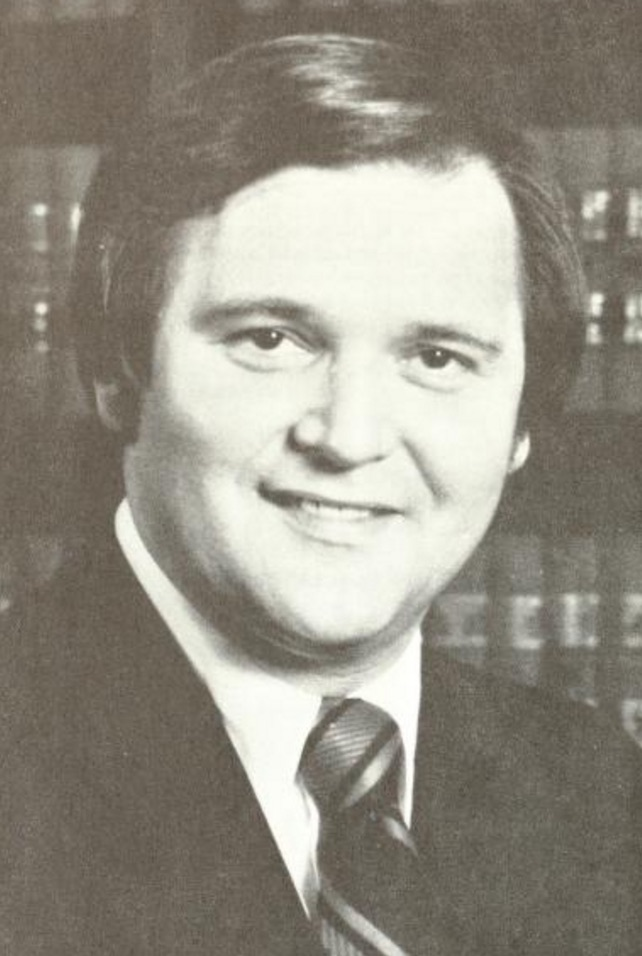
Nominee	James G. Martin	Rufus L. Edmisten
Party	Republican	Democratic
Popular vote	1,208,167	1,011,209
Percentage	54.26%	45.41%
- County results Martin: 50–60% 60–70% 70–80% Edmisten: 50–60% 60–70% 70–80%
Governor before election
Jim Hunt
Democratic
Elected Governor
James G. Martin
Republican

The 1984 North Carolina gubernatorial election was held on November 6, 1984. Democratic incumbent Jim Hunt was unable to run for a third consecutive term under the North Carolina Constitution. He ran instead for the U.S. Senate against Jesse Helms and narrowly lost. Popular 9th District Congressman James G. Martin ran as the Republican gubernatorial nominee against Democratic Attorney General Rufus L. Edmisten, who defeated Hunt's Lt. Governor, James Green, among other candidates, in a hotly contested primary.

Martin won by a comfortable margin on Election Day thanks to the surprise endorsement of Green, and to President Ronald Reagan's coattails (see also 1984 United States presidential election). Martin became just the second Republican elected to the state's highest office in the 20th century. Hunt later served as North Carolina’s Governor again from 1993 to 2001.

An offhand remark by Edmisten during the 1984 campaign became part of the state's political lore. He was quoted as complaining about all the barbecue pork he had to eat on the campaign trail, saying he could not eat anymore of "that damnable stuff", which is widely popular. Edmisten later said he was joking.

== Primary election results ==
=== Democratic primary ===
1984 NC Governor Democratic primary election results
Party	Candidate	Votes	%	±%
Democratic	Rufus L. Edmisten	295,051	30.87%	
Democratic	Eddie Knox	249,286	26.08%	
Democratic	Lauch Faircloth	153,210	16.03%	
Democratic	Thomas O. Gilmore	82,299	8.61%	
Democratic	James C. Green	80,775	8.45%	
Democratic	John R. Ingram	75,248	7.87%	
Democratic	Robert L. Hannon	9,476	0.99%	
Democratic	Frazier Glenn Miller	5,790	0.61%	
Democratic	Andy Barker	3,148	0.33%	
Democratic	J. D. Whaley	1,516	0.16%	

1984 NC Governor Democratic primary runoff election results
Party	Candidate	Votes	%	±%
Democratic	Rufus L. Edmisten	352,351	51.91%	
Democratic	Eddie Knox	326,278	48.08%	−3.83%

=== Republican primary ===
1984 NC Governor Republican primary election results
Party	Candidate	Votes	%	±%
Republican	Jim Martin	128,714	91.71%	
Republican	Ruby T. Hooper	11,640	8.29%	

== General election results ==
1984 NC Governor election results
Party	Candidate	Votes	%	±%
Republican	James G. Martin	1,208,167	54.26%	
Democratic	Rufus L. Edmisten	1,011,209	45.41%	−9.49%
Libertarian	H. Fritz Prochnaw	4,610	0.21%	
Socialist Workers	Gregory McCartan	2,740	0.12%	
Turnout		2,226,743	100.00%	
