= David Flaherty =

American businessman and politician (1928–2020)

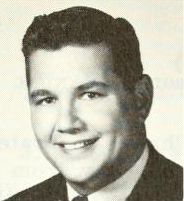
Flaherty, c. 1969

David Thomas Flaherty (December 9, 1928 – December 20, 2020) was an American businessman and politician.

== Early life ==
David Thomas Flaherty was born on December 9, 1928, in Boston. He graduated from The English High School and served in the U.S. Army. He then attended Boston University, where he was elected student body president before graduating in 1956 with a degree in business administration. While his parents were Catholics and members of the Democratic Party, Flaherty converted to Methodism and became a member of the Republican Party. He later said of these differences, "I just didn't like being told what to do." He married Nancy Hamill on December 6, 1953, and had several children with her. In 1955, he moved to Lenoir, North Carolina after being hired by Broyhill Furniture as an assistant sales manager. He later became manager of the company's advertising division and head of its plastics division.

== Political career ==
Since Broyhill Furniture's owner, James Edgar Broyhill, was heavily involved in Republican politics, Flaherty decided to get involved in the state chapter. By 1960, he was involved in the North Carolina Young Republicans and campaigned for Robert L. Gavin in the 1960 gubernatorial election. He was elected to the North Carolina Senate in 1968 and 1970, representing Burke and Caldwell Counties. As the body was under Democratic control and hostile to Republican proposals, he had little impact on state legislation.

Flaherty supported James Holshouser in the 1972 gubernatorial election. After Holshouser won, he appointed Flaherty Secretary of the Department of Human Resources (DHS) on January 5, 1973. He served until 1976 and restructured the department during his tenure. He ran as a candidate for governor in 1976. At this time the North Carolina Republican Party was divided between a moderate group led by Holshouser and a more conservative group led by U.S. Senator Jesse Helms. Flaherty expended significant resources to defeat conservative Coy Privette in the Republican primary election, and faced Democratic Lieutenant Governor Jim Hunt in the general election. Hunt largely ignored Flaherty and campaigned on his own issues, defeating him with 65 percent of the vote in the November election. Flaherty quickly conceded and congratulated Hunt on receiving the "mandate from the people he asked for". He chaired the North Carolina Republican Party before becoming chairman of the Employment Security Commission and then Secretary of DHS under Governor James G. Martin.

== Later life ==
Flaherty's wife died in 2019. He died on December 20, 2020, aged 92, at his home in Cary, North Carolina, following years of declining health.

== Works cited ==
- Cheney, John L. Jr., ed. (1981). North Carolina Government, 1585-1979 : A Narrative and Statistical History (revised ed.). Raleigh: North Carolina Secretary of State. OCLC 1290270510.
- Grimsley, Wayne (2003). James B. Hunt: A North Carolina Progressive. McFarland. ISBN 9780786416073.
- Hood, John (2015). Catalyst: Jim Martin and the Rise of North Carolina Republicans. Winston-Salem: John F. Blair, Publisher. ISBN 9780895876577.
- North Carolina Manual. Raleigh: North Carolina Secretary of State. 1969. OCLC 436873840.

Party political offices
Preceded by James Holshouser	Republican nominee for Governor of North Carolina; 1976	Succeeded by I. Beverly Lake Jr.
Preceded by Asa T. Spaulding Jr.	Republican nominee for North Carolina Secretary of State; 1980	Succeeded by Patric G. Dorsey
