= Rufus Edmisten =

American attorney (born 1941)

Rufus L. Edmisten
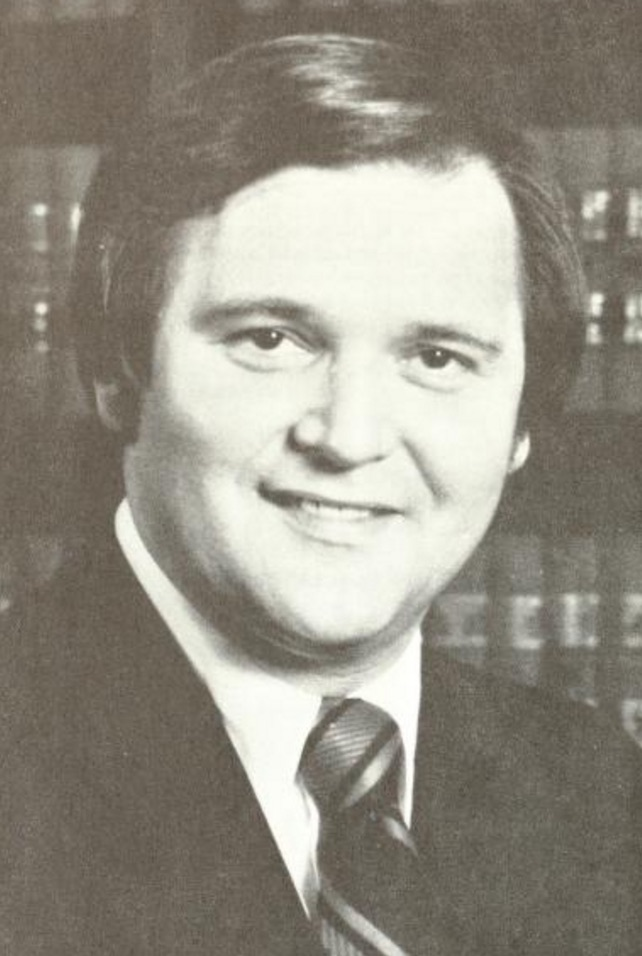

21st Secretary of State of North Carolina
- In office 1989–1996
- Governor: James G. Martin; James B. Hunt Jr.
- Preceded by: Thad A. Eure
- Succeeded by: Janice Faulkner

46th Attorney General of North Carolina
- In office 1974–1984
- Governor: James Holshouser; Jim Hunt
- Preceded by: James H. Carson Jr.
- Succeeded by: Lacy Thornburg

Personal details
- Born: Rufus Lige Edmisten; July 12, 1941 (age 85) Boone, North Carolina, U.S.
- Party: Democratic
- Education: University of North Carolina at Chapel Hill (BA); George Washington University (JD)

Rufus Lige Edmisten (born July 12, 1941) is an American attorney who served as North Carolina Secretary of State, Attorney General, and was the Democratic nominee for Governor in 1984. He is currently a lawyer in private practice.

== Life and career ==
Edmisten was born on July 12, 1941, in Boone, North Carolina, to Walter F. Edmisten and Nell Hollar Edmisten. He graduated from Appalachian High School in 1959.

He earned an undergraduate degree in political science religious at the University of North Carolina at Chapel Hill, and a J.D. from the George Washington University School of Law in Washington, D.C.. During law school, he joined the Capitol Hill staff of North Carolina Senator Sam Ervin, where he served as the Counsel to Senator Ervin's Judiciary Subcommittee on Constitutional Rights and as Chief Counsel and Staff Director of the Subcommittee on Separation of Powers. He also worked on legislation related to civil rights for Native Americans and the separation of church and state.

In 1973-1974, Edmisten was the Deputy Chief Counsel for the Senate Watergate Committee, which Ervin chaired. With Terry Lenzner, an assistant counsel on the Senate Watergate Committee, Edmisten served the subpoena to the White House for the Watergate tapes. It was the first time in history that a Congressional Committee served a subpoena on a sitting president. During his time working for Senator Ervin, Edmisten participated in important legislative initiatives, such as securing constitutional rights for American Indians and providing constitutional protections for military personnel. Following Senator Ervin's retirement in 1974, Edmisten returned to North Carolina. He was elected state attorney general in 1974 and served in that post for ten years. Edmisten was the Democratic nominee for governor in 1984, losing to Republican James G. Martin, a loss attributed to Martin's endorsements by Edmisten's Democratic primary rivals.

Edmisten subsequently returned to private practice, joining with Regan Weaver in Raleigh.

In 1998, Edmisten returned to politics and was elected as the Secretary of State. He was reelected in 1992. During his term, he led legislative efforts to introduce limited liability companies into North Carolina and established the Foundation for Good Business.

In 1996 Edmisten resigned from office after an audit of the Secretary of State's office led to a State Bureau of Investigations inquiry into several alleged abuses of office. No charges were ultimately filed and Edmisten maintained that his resignation had nothing to do with the investigation. After his resignation in 1996 Edmisten launched a legal practice that merged with that of former NC Department of Justice colleague and Deputy US attorney, Woody Webb.

Edmisten also launched the Super Kids Scholarship Program.

In 2019 Edmisten published a memoir titled, "That's Rufus: A Memoir of Tar Heel Politics, Watergate and Public Life".

Edmisten was formerly married to Jane Moretz, who went on to be a professor at The George Washington University Law School, but they divorced in 1981. He married Linda Harris in 1983 and they continue to live in Raleigh.

== Electoral history ==
Democratic primary election, Governor of North Carolina, May 8, 1984
Party	Candidate	Votes	%
Democratic	Rufus L. Edmisten	295,051	30.87
Democratic	Eddie Knox	249,286	26.08
Democratic	Duncan McLauchlin "Lauch" Faircloth	153,210	16.03
Democratic	Thomas O. Gilmore	82,299	8.61
Democratic	James C. "Jimmy" Green	80,775	8.45
Democratic	John R. Ingram	75,248	7.87
Democratic	Robert L. Hannon	9,476	0.99
Democratic	Frazier Glenn Miller Jr.	5,790	0.61
Democratic	J. Andrew Barker	3,148	0.33
Democratic	J.D. Whaley	1,516	0.16

1984 NC Governor Democratic Primary Runoff Results
Party	Candidate	Votes	%	±%
Democratic	Rufus L. Edmisten	352,351	51.91%	
Democratic	Eddie Knox	326,278	48.08%%	−3.83%

== General election results ==
1984 NC Governor Election Results
Party	Candidate	Votes	%	±%
Republican	James G. Martin	1,208,167	54.26%	
Democratic	Rufus L. Edmisten	1,011,209	45.41%	−9.49%
Libertarian	H. Fritz Prochnaw	4,610	0.21%	
Socialist Workers	Gregory McCartan	2,740	0.12%	
Turnout		2,226,743	100%	

Party political offices
Preceded by Robert Burren Morgan	Democratic nominee for Attorney General of North Carolina; 1974, 1976, 1980	Succeeded by Lacy Thornburg
Preceded by Jim Hunt	Democratic nominee for Governor of North Carolina; 1984	Succeeded by Robert B. Jordan
Preceded by Thad A. Eure	Democratic nominee for North Carolina Secretary of State; 1988, 1992	Succeeded by Elaine Marshall
Legal offices
Preceded by James H. Carson Jr.	Attorney General of North Carolina; 1975–1985	Succeeded by Lacy Thornburg
