= Tom Gilmore (North Carolina politician) =

American nurseryman and politician (1936–2019)

Member of the North Carolina House of Representatives from the 23rd district
- In office 1972–1978

Personal details
- Born: November 15, 1936 Julian, North Carolina
- Died: September 24, 2019 (aged 82)
- Party: Democratic
- Occupation: Nurseryman

Thomas Odell Gilmore, Sr. (November 15, 1936 - September 24, 2019) was an American nurseryman and politician in the state of North Carolina. He was born in Julian, North Carolina.

A Democrat, he served in the North Carolina House of Representatives from 1972 to 1978 and later served as Deputy Secretary of Human Resources under Gov. Jim Hunt. He ran for Governor of North Carolina in 1984, for Congress in 1988, and for North Carolina Commissioner of Agriculture in 2004.
