= Institute for Emerging Issues =

Public policy organization in North Carolina

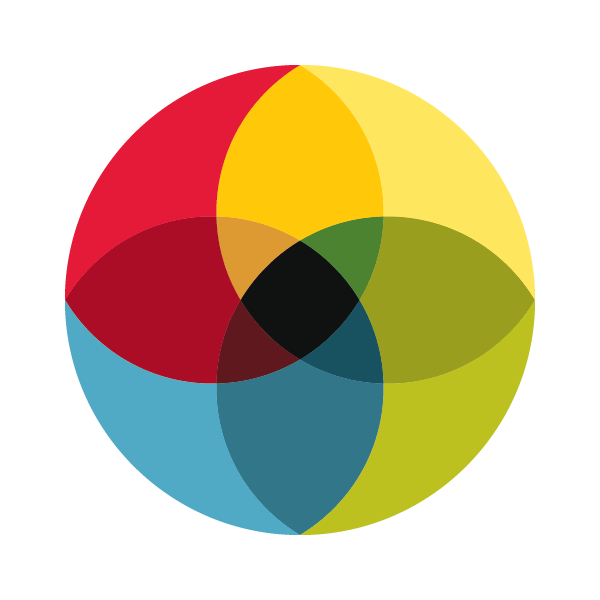
- Abbreviation: IEI
- Established: 2002
- Founder: Jim Hunt
- Type: Public policy think tank
- Location: Raleigh, NC
- Website: www.emergingissues.org

The Institute for Emerging Issues (IEI) is a non-partisan public policy organization that exists to enhance North Carolina's long-term prosperity.

== History ==
The institute's roots reach back to 1986, when Governor James B. Hunt, Jr., and NC State Chancellor Bruce Poulton convened the first Emerging Issues Forum. The Forum is an annual, two-day gathering of international, national and statewide thought leaders and stakeholders who discuss challenges and opportunities for North Carolina. A defining feature of the Forum is participants' collaborative effort to build consensus around specific recommendations for further collective action.

In 2002, North Carolina State University's trustees established the Institute of Emerging Issues to administer the annual Forum and to conduct a related program of work across North Carolina.

=== Emerging Issues Forum ===
The annual Emerging Issues Forum is IEI's signature event, drawing more than 1,000 attendees each year. The first annual Emerging Issues Forum took place on January 8, 1986 at the McKimmon Center in Raleigh, North Carolina. The theme was "Innovation and Competition: The Challenge to America." Speakers and participants included Chancellor Bruce Poulton, Governor Jim Hunt, NC State Student Body President Jay Everette, John A. Young, and Jim Goodnight, among others.

Past speakers include former Presidents Bill Clinton and Jimmy Carter, former Speaker of the House Newt Gingrich, New York Times columnist Tom Friedman, Steve Forbes and others. Recent Forum topics have included "Generation Z," advanced manufacturing and world-class teaching.

==== Reconnect NC Forum Series ====
In 2018, the institute introduced a new model for forums, having two forums per year over three years, all focused on reconnecting North Carolina. Several were hosted outside of Raleigh.

== Leadership ==
The Institute for Emerging Issues reports formally to the Office of the Executive Vice Chancellor and Provost. IEI is guided by a National Advisory Board, chaired by Mr. John F.A.V. Cecil, President, Biltmore Farms, LLC. Gov. James B. Hunt, Jr., who served as founding Chair 2002-2014, is Chair Emeritus. Leslie Boney joined IEI in January 2017, serving as the director.
