= Jim Hunt =

American politician (1937–2025)

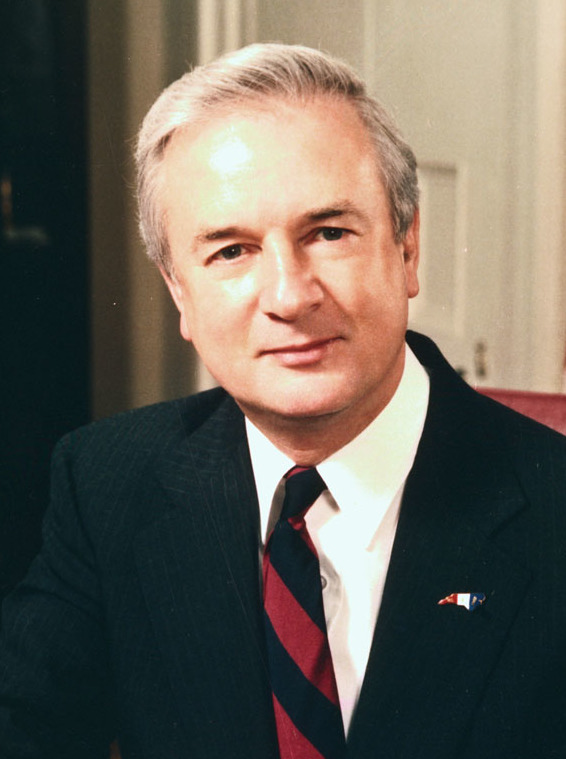
- Official portrait, c. 1993–2001

69th and 71st Governor of North Carolina
- In office January 9, 1993 – January 6, 2001
- Lieutenant: Dennis Wicker
- Preceded by: James G. Martin
- Succeeded by: Mike Easley
- In office January 8, 1977 – January 5, 1985
- Lieutenant: James C. Green
- Preceded by: James Holshouser
- Succeeded by: James G. Martin

27th Lieutenant Governor of North Carolina
- In office January 5, 1973 – January 8, 1977
- Governor: James Holshouser
- Preceded by: Hoyt Patrick Taylor Jr.
- Succeeded by: James C. Green

Personal details
- Born: James Baxter Hunt Jr. May 16, 1937 Greensboro, North Carolina, U.S.
- Died: December 18, 2025 (aged 88) Lucama, North Carolina, U.S.
- Party: Democratic
- Spouse: Carolyn Leonard (m. 1958)
- Children: 4, including Rachel and Baxter
- Education: North Carolina State University (BS, MS); University of North Carolina, Chapel Hill (JD)

James Baxter Hunt Jr. (May 16, 1937 – December 18, 2025) was an American politician and attorney who was the 69th and 71st governor of North Carolina (1977–1985, and 1993–2001). He was the longest-serving governor in the state's history.

Hunt was tied with former Ohio governor Jim Rhodes for the sixth-longest gubernatorial tenure in post-Constitutional U.S. history at 5,838 days. His daughter is current North Carolina Lieutenant Governor Rachel Hunt.

Under his guidance, the North Carolina Democratic Party outperformed expectations in state politics from Ronald Reagan's presidency through the 1990s.

== Early life ==
Hunt was born in Greensboro, North Carolina, on May 16, 1937, to James Baxter Hunt, a soil conservationist, and Elsie Brame Hunt, a schoolteacher. When he was a child, the family moved to a farm outside of Wilson, North Carolina. He was raised in the Free Will Baptist Church but later converted to Presbyterianism.

He was a graduate of North Carolina State College, now known as North Carolina State University, with a B.S. in agricultural education and a M.S. in agricultural economics. During his undergraduate career, Hunt was involved in Student Government. He was the second student to serve two terms as Student Body President of NC State. His master's thesis was about economic analysis of different tobacco production techniques. In 1964, he received a J.D. from the University of North Carolina School of Law. He went on to serve as the president of the Young Democratic Clubs of North Carolina, now known as the Young Democrats of North Carolina.

== Political career ==
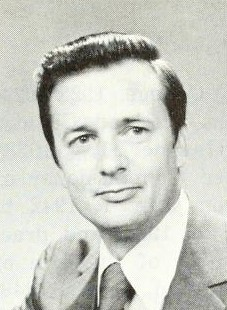
Hunt as Lieutenant Governor, c. 1973

From 1964 to 1966, Hunt was a Ford Foundation economic advisor in Nepal. After working on several state and national campaigns for Democratic candidates and attending several Democratic conventions as a delegate, in addition to his work with the North Carolina Young Democratic Clubs, in 1972 he ran successfully for lieutenant governor. He was sworn in on January 5, 1973. With the election of James Holshouser as governor in 1972—the first Republican to win the office in decades—the Democratic majority in the General Assembly was compelled to raise the stature of the office of the lieutenant governor. It raised the job's salary from $5,000 to $30,000 per year, increased the office operating budget, and expanded its staff from two to five.

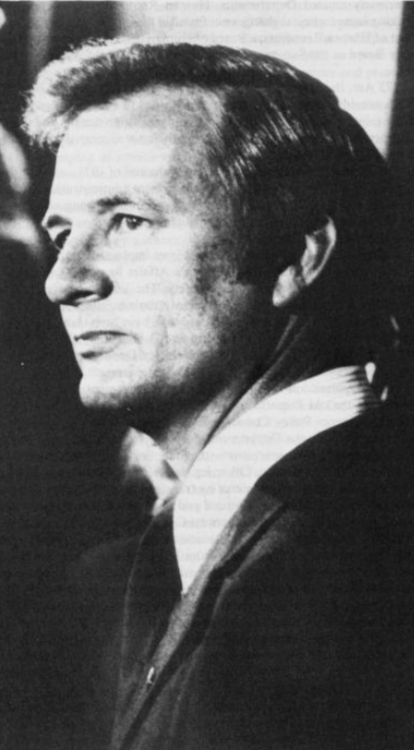
Hunt as governor in 1983

Hunt was first sworn in as Governor of North Carolina on January 8, 1977. He was the only Governor of North Carolina to have been elected to four terms. He was first elected governor in 1976 over Republican David Flaherty and was re-elected in 1980, defeating I. Beverly Lake. Hunt supported a constitutional change during his first term that allowed him to be the first North Carolina governor to run for a second consecutive term.

In 1981, Hunt chaired the Hunt Commission, named after himself, which established superdelegates in the Democratic National Convention.

In 1984, he lost a bitterly contested race for the U.S. Senate seat held by Jesse Helms, and left elective politics for eight years. He returned in 1992 and defeated Republican lieutenant governor and Hardee's executive Jim Gardner to win the governorship. Hunt was re-elected by a large margin over future U.S. Congressman Robin Hayes in 1996. He left office in January 2001, and was replaced by Attorney General Mike Easley.

=== Actions and political views ===
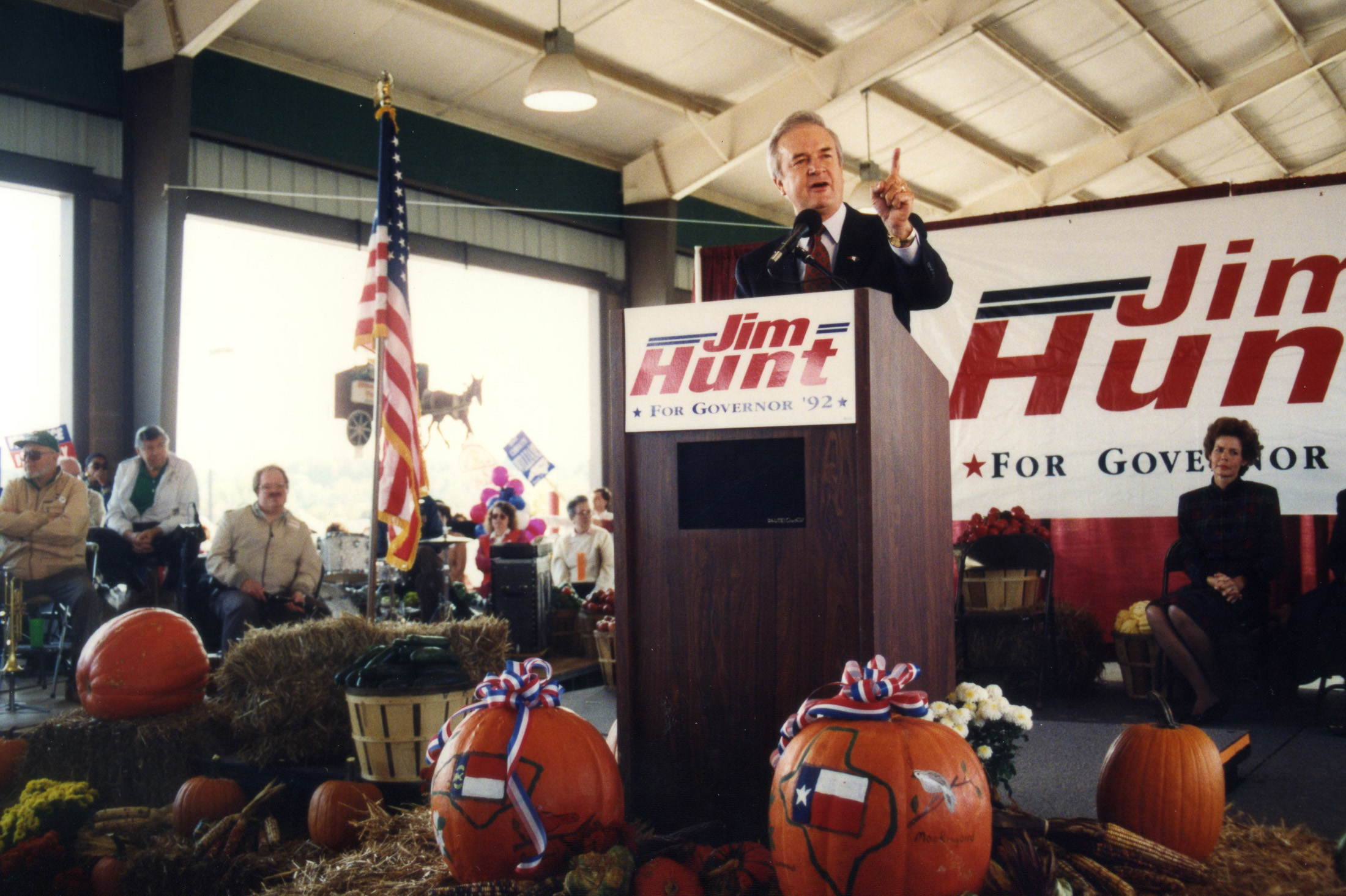
Jim Hunt campaigning in 1992

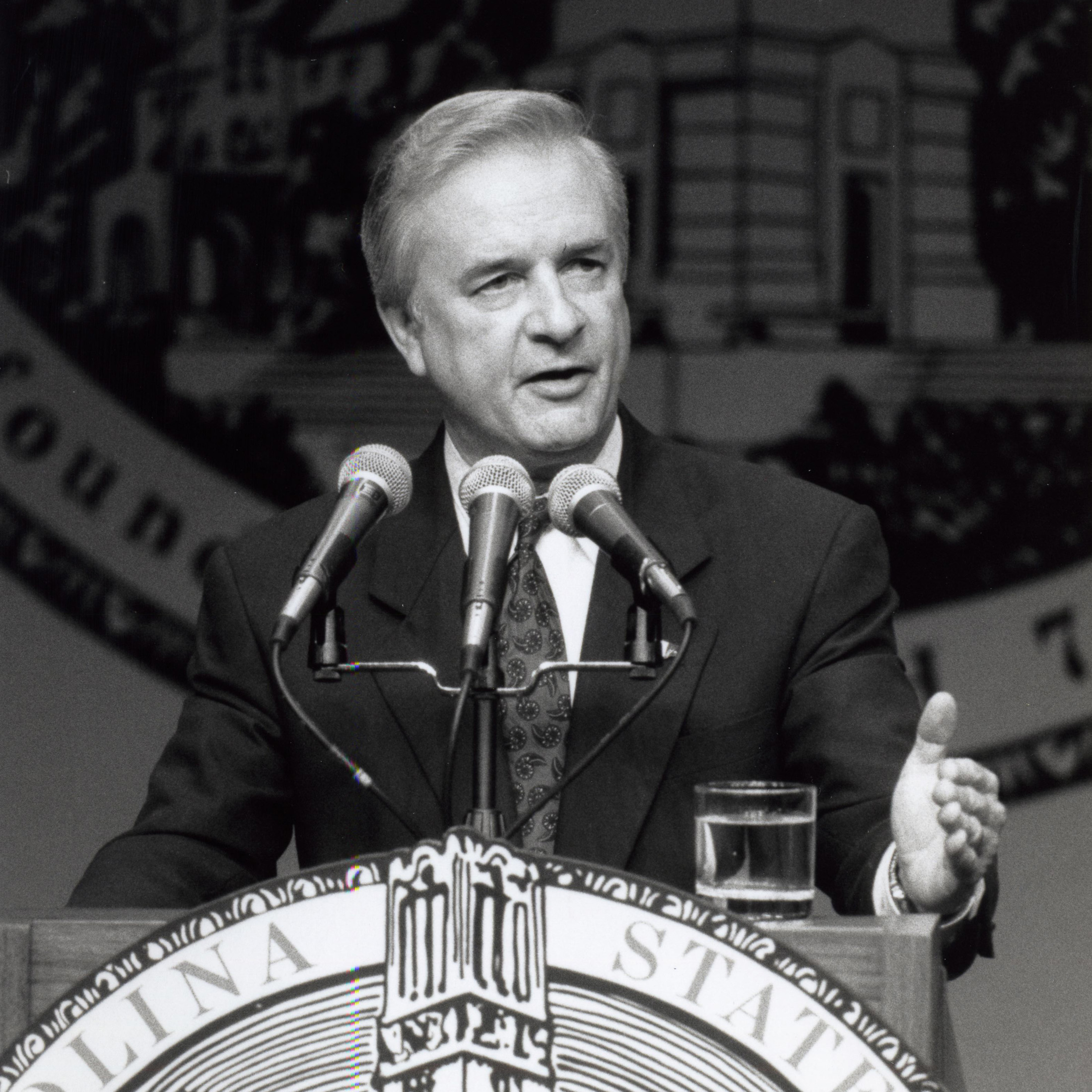
Hunt speaking at NCSU in 1992

In the 1970s, Governor Hunt was a supporter of the Equal Rights Amendment and, with his wife Carolyn, he urged its approval by the state legislature (which failed to ratify it by two votes) and appointed Betty Ray McCain as his chief lobbyist for the amendment. Hunt was an early proponent of teaching standards and early childhood education, gaining national recognition for the Smart Start program for pre-kindergarteners. In his book, First in America: An Education Governor Challenges North Carolina, Hunt said that under testing and accountability measures he put into place test scores went up. He said 56% of students were proficient in 1994 compared with 70% in the year 2000. He said without testing students slip through the cracks and face a "limited future" (p. 55). In 2000 he was mentioned as a possible Democratic nominee for Vice President of the United States or Education Secretary for Al Gore had Gore been successful in the 2000 presidential race. 2004 Democratic nominee Sen. John Kerry was likewise considering Hunt for Secretary of Education had he won, and he was considered a candidate to be Barack Obama's Secretary of Education.

Hunt served as chair of the Carnegie Task Force on Teaching as a Profession, which created the National Board for Professional Teaching Standards, and served on the Spellings Commission on the Future of Higher Education.

As governor, Hunt was involved in a variety of efforts to promote technology and technology-based economic development, including the establishment of the North Carolina Biotechnology Center, Centennial Campus of North Carolina State University, and the North Carolina School of Science and Mathematics.

Hunt was key actor in the trial of the Wilmington Ten. By the late 1970s, their case had gained international attention and was viewed as an embarrassment to the U.S. and North Carolina in particular. CBS had broadcast a 60 Minutes piece about the case that suggested that the evidence against the ten had been fabricated. In January 1978, following the higher courts' refusal to dismiss these charges, Hunt decided to reduce their sentencing of 20–25 years to 13–17 years rather than pardon and free them. Many black North Carolinian politicians at the time disapproved of Hunt's decision but the general mentality at the time was that "right now blacks have nowhere else to turn" so there was no organized opposition movement. Howard Nathaniel Lee, however, refused to resign from his appointed role as the Secretary of the North Carolina Department of Natural Resources and Community Development, as a form of protest against Hunt.

During his tenure, Hunt would appoint both the first African American to the North Carolina Supreme Court, Henry Frye, and the first Black Cabinet member, former Secretary of Natural Resources and Community Development Howard Lee.

Hunt supported the death penalty and rarely granted clemency to death-row inmates. During his terms in office Hunt oversaw 13 executions (two during his first period in office, 11 during his second). Notable executions included the first execution in North Carolina after the US Supreme Court reinstated capital punishment in 1976 (James W. Hutchins) and the first nationwide execution of a woman in 22 years (Velma Barfield).

Hunt was a proponent of North Carolina's tobacco industry, even after the negative health effects of tobacco use became clear. When Ronald Reagan Administration U.S. Surgeon General Dr. C. Everett Koop accused the tobacco industry of directing advertising at children and threatening human lives, Hunt called for his impeachment.

== Retirement ==
Hunt founded and was chair emeritus of the Institute for Emerging Issues at N.C. State University in Raleigh. In 2001 Hunt founded the James B. Hunt Jr. Institute for Educational Leadership & Policy Foundation, Inc., commonly known as The Hunt Institute. The organization is dedicated to empowering governors, policymakers, and other educational leaders in the development and implementation of comprehensive strategies for the transformation of public education.

== Personal life and death ==
Hunt married Carolyn Leonard in 1958. They had a son (James Baxter Hunt III) and three daughters (including Rachel Hunt, a former North Carolina state senator and, as of 2025, Lieutenant Governor of the state.

Hunt died at his home in Lucama, North Carolina, on December 18, 2025, at the age of 88. Flags across the state of North Carolina would fly at half staff in his honor from December 19, 2025 until his internment. Starting on December 20, 2025, the North Carolina State Capitol began displaying a book of condolence for Hunt which people are invited to sign. His funeral was held on December 26, 2025, at First Presbyterian Church in Wilson, North Carolina, with friend, family and political figures from around North Carolina being among those in attendance. Following the funeral, reception and visitation was held. The public was allowed to attend Hunt's funeral services and visitation. Hunt was then buried. The condolence book for Hunt at the North Carolina State Capitol remained available through January 2, 2026.

== Electoral history ==
=== 1972 North Carolina lieutenant gubernatorial election ===
Democratic primary results
Party	Candidate	Votes	%
Democratic	Jim Hunt	329,727	43.77
Democratic	Roy G. Sowers Jr.	177,016	23.28
Democratic	Margaret T. Harper	151,819	20.15
Democratic	Allen C. Barbee	51,602	6.85
Democratic	Reginald L. Frazier	43,228	5.74

General election results
Party	Candidate	Votes	%	±%
Democratic	Jim Hunt	812,602	56.69	
Republican	John A. Walker	612,002	42.69	
American	Benjamin G. McLendonm, Sr.	8,865	0.62	
Turnout		1,433,469	100%	

=== 1976 North Carolina gubernatorial election ===

Democratic primary results
Party	Candidate	Votes	%
Democratic	Jim Hunt	362,102	53.41
Democratic	Edward O'Herron Jr.	157,815	23.28
Democratic	George Wood	121,673	17.95
Democratic	Thomas E. Strickland	31,338	4.62
Democratic	Andy Barker	5,003	0.74

General election results
Party	Candidate	Votes	%	±%
Democratic	Jim Hunt	1,081,293	64.99	
Republican	David T. Flaherty	564,102	33.90	
American	Herbert F. Seawell Jr.	13,604	0.82	
Libertarian	Arlan K. Andrews	4,764	0.29	
Turnout		1,663,763		

=== 1980 North Carolina gubernatorial election ===

Democratic primary results
Party	Candidate	Votes	%	±%
Democratic	Jim Hunt	524,844	69.64	
Democratic	Robert W. "Bob" Scott	217,289	28.83	
Democratic	Harry J. Welsh	11,551	1.53	

General election results
Party	Candidate	Votes	%	±%
Democratic	Jim Hunt (Incumbent)	1,143,145	61.88%	
Republican	I. Beverly Lake	691,449	37.43%	
Libertarian	Robert Y. Emory	9,552	0.54%	
Socialist Workers	Douglas A. Cooper	2,887	0.16%	
Independent	Others	53	0%	
Turnout		1,847,086	100%	

=== 1984 North Carolina senatorial election ===

Democratic primary results
Party	Candidate	Votes	%
Democratic	Jim Hunt	655,429	77.48%
Democratic	Thomas Allred	126,841	14.99%
Democratic	Harrill Jones	63,676	7.53%
Turnout		845,946	

General election results
Party	Candidate	Votes	%
Republican	Jesse Helms (incumbent)	1,156,768	51.66%
Democratic	Jim Hunt	1,070,488	47.81%
Libertarian	Bobby Emory	9,302	0.42%
Socialist Workers	Kate Daher	2,493	0.11%
Turnout		2,239,051	

=== 1992 North Carolina gubernatorial election ===

Democratic primary results
Party	Candidate	Votes	%	±%
Democratic	Jim Hunt	459,300	65.46	
Democratic	Lacy Thornburg	188,806	26.91	
Democratic	Marcus W. Williams	25,660	3.66	

General election results
Party	Candidate	Votes	%	±%
Democratic	Jim Hunt	1,368,246	52.72	
Republican	Jim Gardner	1,121,955	43.23	
Libertarian	Scott McLaughlin	104,983	4.05	
Turnout		2,595,184		

=== 1996 North Carolina gubernatorial election ===

Hunt ran unopposed in the Democratic primary.

General election results
Party	Candidate	Votes	%	±%
Democratic	Jim Hunt (incumbent)	1,436,638	55.98	
Republican	Robin Hayes	1,097,053	42.75	
Libertarian	Scott D. Yost	17,559	0.68	
Natural Law	Julia Van Witt	14,792	0.58	
Turnout		2,566,042		

== Legacy ==
James B. Hunt Jr. Library
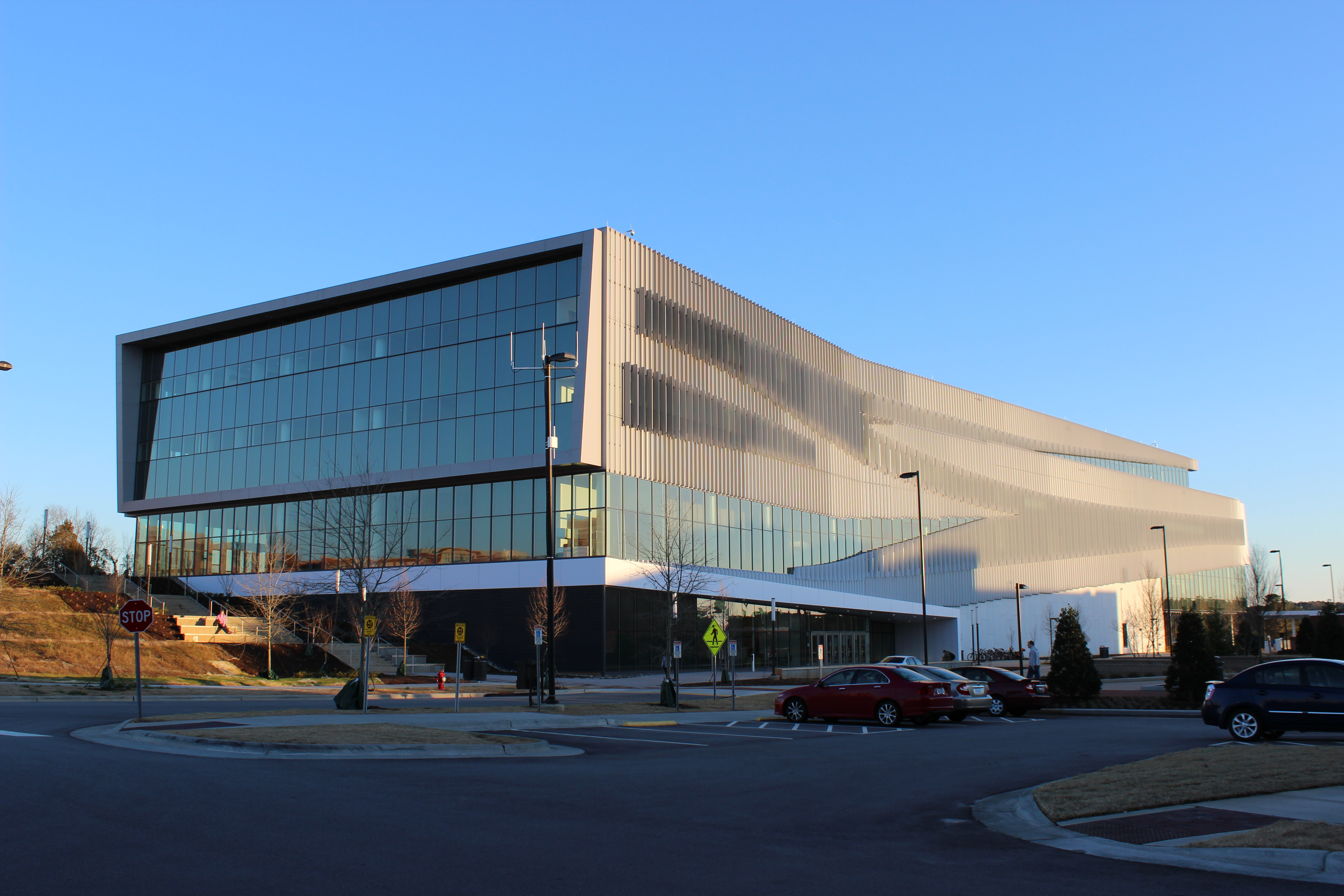

The following are named for Governor Hunt:

- James B. Hunt, Jr. Institute for Educational Leadership & Policy
- James B. Hunt Jr. Library at North Carolina State University Centennial Campus
- James Hunt High School in Wilson County, North Carolina
- Governor James B. Hunt Jr. Highway, A 20-mile-long stretch of highway within U.S. 264 linking Zebulon, North Carolina to Wilson, North Carolina.
- James B. Hunt Jr. Residence Hall at North Carolina School of Science and Mathematics
- James B. Hunt Jr. Horse Complex at the North Carolina State Fairgrounds is used year-round for horse shows and other agricultural exhibitions.
- The M/V Gov. James B. Hunt Jr. is a ferry in the North Carolina Department of Transportation Ferry Division
- Hunt Hall (dormitory) at the University of North Carolina at Charlotte

An authorized biography of Hunt, authored by advisor Gary Pearce, was released in 2010.

== See also ==
- List of governors of North Carolina

== Works cited ==
- Cheney, John L. Jr., ed. (1981). North Carolina Government, 1585–1979: A Narrative and Statistical History (Revised ed.). Raleigh: North Carolina Secretary of State. LCCN 81-620017. OCLC 1290270510.
- Coble, Ran (April 1989). "The Lieutenant Governorship in North Carolina: An Office in Transition" (PDF). In the Executive Branch. N.C. Insight. Vol. 11, no. 2–3: Profiles in Poverty. N.C. Center for Public Policy Research. pp. 157–165. Archived (PDF) from the original on December 25, 2025.

Party political offices
Preceded by Pat Taylor	Democratic nominee for Lieutenant Governor of North Carolina; 1972	Succeeded by James C. Green
Preceded by Skipper Bowles	Democratic nominee for Governor of North Carolina; 1976, 1980	Succeeded by Rufus L. Edmisten
Preceded by Patrick Lucey	Chair of the Democratic Governors Association; 1978–1979	Succeeded by Ella T. Grasso
Preceded by John Ingram	Democratic nominee for U.S. Senator from North Carolina (Class 2); 1984	Succeeded by Harvey Gantt
Preceded by Robert B. Jordan	Democratic nominee for Governor of North Carolina; 1992, 1996	Succeeded by Mike Easley
Political offices
Preceded by Pat Taylor	Lieutenant Governor of North Carolina; 1973–1977	Succeeded by James C. Green
Preceded by James Holshouser	Governor of North Carolina; 1977–1985	Succeeded by James G. Martin
Preceded by James G. Martin	Governor of North Carolina; 1993–2001	Succeeded by Mike Easley
