= Ruby Hooper =

American politician

Ruby T. Hooper (October 5, 1924 – October 12, 2007) was an American dietitian, healthcare food service director, and politician from North Carolina. In 1984, Hooper made history by becoming the first woman to run for Governor of North Carolina as a major party candidate.

== Education and personal life ==
Hooper was born in Saluda, North Carolina. She earned an associate degree from Mars Hill College in 1943 and a bachelor's degree from the University of North Carolina, Greensboro in 1945. She married John O. Hooper in 1946. They had one child, Dr. Elizabeth Hooper Jackson. Hooper died on October 12, 2007, at Memorial Mission Hospital in Asheville, North Carolina. She was 83 years old.

== Career and Political Activity ==
Following college graduation in 1946, Hooper began work as an assistant dietitian Broughton Hospital. In 1953, she became director of food service at Broughton Hospital, a position she held until retirement in 1982.

Hooper served as the chairperson of the Burke County Republican Party and unsuccessfully sought election to the North Carolina House of Representatives in 1982. She later ran as a Republican Party candidate in the 1984 North Carolina gubernatorial election. However, she was defeated in the Republican primary by James G. Martin, who went on to be elected the governor of North Carolina in the general election. She served as deputy secretary of the Department of Human Resources in Martin's administration. She resigned from this position in 1991 to seek the nomination as the Republican gubernatorial candidate. She lost the nomination to Lt. Gov. James C. Gardner.

Hooper was also involved with the N.C. Committee on Fetal Alcohol Syndrome, the N.C. Caring Program for Children, and served as secretary on the Governor's Advisory Council on Aging.

Among other awards, Hooper was named Burke County Woman of the Year in 1984, recognized as the Mars Hill College 1987 Alumna of the Year, and received a community service award from the Governor in 1990.
