= Alex McMillan =

American politician

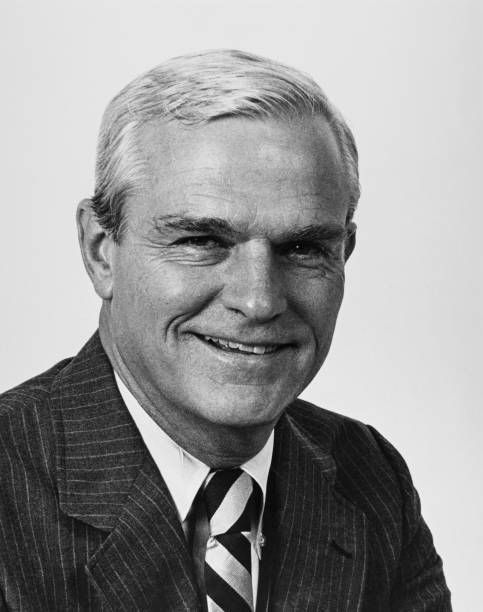

Member of the U.S. House of Representatives from North Carolina's 9th district
- In office January 3, 1985 – January 3, 1995
- Preceded by: James G. Martin
- Succeeded by: Sue Myrick

Personal details
- Born: John Alexander McMillan III; May 9, 1932 Charlotte, North Carolina, U.S.
- Died: April 19, 2024 (aged 91) Charleston, South Carolina, U.S.
- Party: Republican
- Education: University of North Carolina at Chapel Hill, University of Virginia

John Alexander McMillan III (May 9, 1932 – April 19, 2024) was a North Carolina Republican politician who served five terms in the U.S. House of Representatives, representing North Carolina's 9th congressional district from 1985 to 1995.

== Biography ==
McMillan, a native of Charlotte, North Carolina, graduated from Woodberry Forest School in Orange, Virginia. McMillan earned an A.B. in History from the University of North Carolina at Chapel Hill in 1954 and earned his M.B.A. from the University of Virginia. While a student at UNC, McMillan joined the Sigma Alpha Epsilon fraternity.

After serving two years as an intelligence agent in the United States Army, McMillan worked in investment banking, was CFO of Ruddick Corp. from 1970 to 1976 and was CEO of Harris Teeter Super Markets from 1977 to 1983. He served on the Mecklenburg County board of commissioners and chaired its board of social services before being elected to Congress in 1984. He did not run for re-election in 1994. McMillan served for three years as Hipp Chair on the faculty of The Citadel.

McMillan died on April 19, 2024 in Charleston, South Carolina.

U.S. House of Representatives
Preceded by James G. Martin	Member of the U.S. House of Representatives from North Carolina's 9th congressional district 1985–1995	Succeeded by Sue Myrick
