= James H. Carson Jr. =

American politician

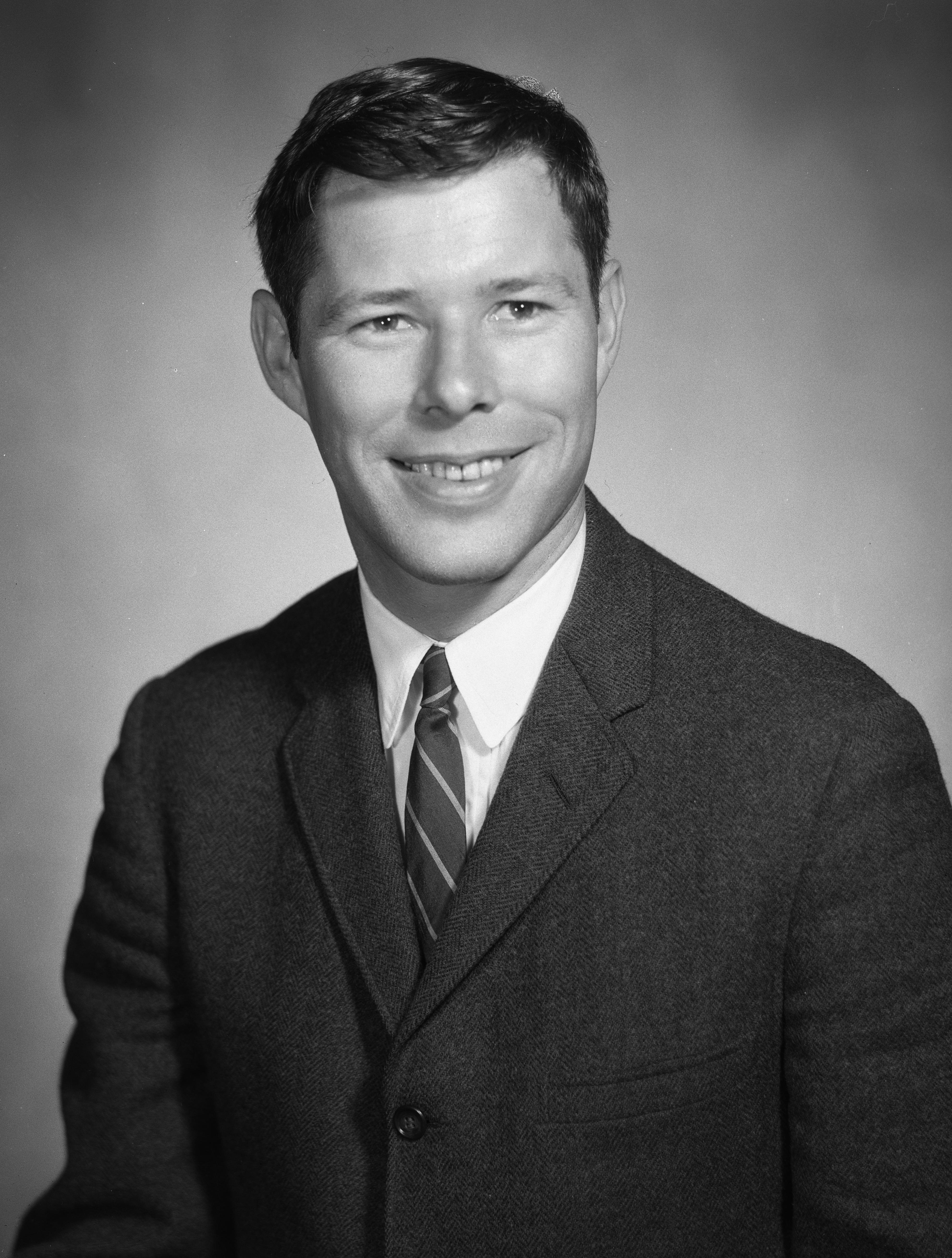
- c. 1967

45th Attorney General of North Carolina
- In office August 26, 1974 – 1975
- Governor: James Holshouser
- Preceded by: Robert Burren Morgan
- Succeeded by: Rufus Edmisten

Personal details
- Born: James Holmes Carson Jr. February 14, 1935 Charlotte, North Carolina, U.S.
- Died: August 28, 2015 (aged 80) Charlotte, North Carolina, U.S.
- Party: Republican
- Occupation: lawyer

James Holmes Carson Jr. (February 14, 1935 – August 28, 2015) was an American lawyer and politician. He was appointed North Carolina Attorney General on August 26, 1974, by Governor James E. Holshouser, Jr. after Robert Burren Morgan resigned to devote his attention to a run for the U.S. Senate. Carson then ran in a special election for Attorney General, which he lost to Democrat Rufus L. Edmisten. He is the most recent Republican to serve as North Carolina's Attorney General.

Carson also served two terms in the North Carolina House of Representatives, serving the 36th district, in Mecklenburg County. He died of myelodysplastic syndrome on August 28, 2015.

Party political offices
| Preceded by Nicholas A. Smith | Republican nominee for Attorney General of North Carolina; 1974 | Succeeded by Edward L. Powell |
