= Smart Start (education) =

The Smart Start logo

Smart Start is a North Carolina public-private initiative, founded in 1993, that provides funding to local non-profit organizations throughout the state to "ensure that young children enter school healthy and ready to succeed". Smart Start funding supports child care, efforts to reduce the cost of child care, access to health services, and family support. In 2019–2020, the budget for Smart Start is approximately $151 million, with at least 10% raised privately. Administrative costs for the program are limited by statute to 8%.

== History ==
The program was established in the 1993-1994 legislative session of the North Carolina General Assembly, and signed into law by North Carolina Governor Jim Hunt on July 9, 1993. Following initial funding of the program, applications were submitted from around the state. The law limited pilot funding of $20 million to 12 programs, one per state congressional district. The 12 pilot programs covered 18 counties.

By 1996, Smart Start had expanded to 24 local programs, and a state-sponsored audit by Coopers & Lybrand praised its results, saying that it was "easy to see that there is an incredible amount of good being done by Smart Start". The report also recommended financial changes, saying it was not convinced all local programs were ensuring they were getting the best value for their money.

Expanding to 55 counties and a $92 million budget in 1998, studies continued to show improvements around the state. A University of North Carolina study concluding that the quality of child care in the 18 counties that were initially funded had improved measurably. Researchers did not conclude that Smart Start was responsible for the improvements, but did note that participation in the program increased the likelihood of improvement.

In 1999, the program announced that it had exceeded its private fundraising goal of $13.9 million by raising a total of $19 million for the year.

By the end of 2000, the program had expanded to all serve 100 counties in the state, with a budget of $263 million.

== Criticism ==
Critics of the program have expressed concern over the inability to measure whether or not it is successful.

Some audits have revealed financial mismanagement, especially at the local level. In fiscal year 2000, more than half of the local agencies either did not get a "clean audit" or didn't spend the required percentage of funds on child care subsidies. Also in fiscal year 2000, the program was cited for overdrawing its bank accounts by $5.5 million. Karen Ponder, the director of the program at the time, responded that the issues were "the kinds of things young organizations always have".

The program also initially drew public ire in North Carolina from parents of children who attended private school and who were home-schooled and from associated religious organizations. This occurred primarily due to statements from North Carolina Governor Jim Hunt that suggested he wished to mandate that all children statewide must participate in the Smart Start program. These statements were viewed by many in the private education and home-schooled sectors and in the religious community as a government attack on non-public education and parental choice at the primary level and as a possible precursor to the abolition of non-public education in the state, resulting in the forced public school attendance of all state children. Governor Hunt quickly amended his statements, indicating that Smart Start was a completely voluntary program.

== Similar programs ==
In 1999, representatives from the British House of Commons visited a Smart Start facility in Durham, North Carolina, studying how to create a similar program in England. They were impressed enough to say they would "push hard" to implement their program in a similar manner to Smart Start.

South Carolinians looked at Smart Start while creating a similar program called First Steps in 1999.

== Awards and grants ==
- 1998 - $20,000 from the Ford Foundation and Harvard University's John F. Kennedy School of Government

== See also ==
- Family economics
- Cost of raising a child
