= Coy Privette =

American politician

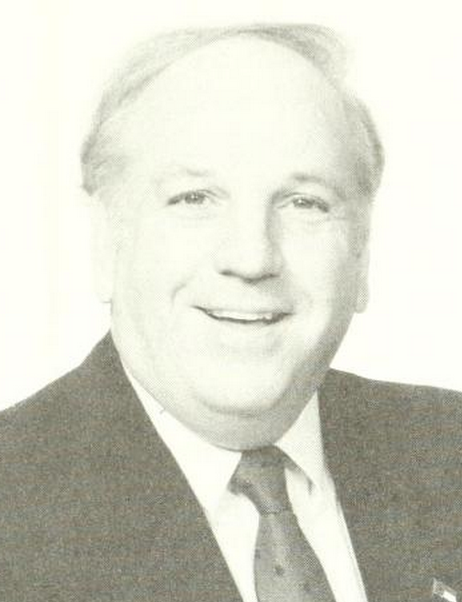

Member of the North Carolina House of Representatives
- In office 1985–1992

Personal details
- Born: January 31, 1933 Statesville, North Carolina
- Died: March 25, 2015 (aged 82) Thomasville, North Carolina
- Party: Republican
- Spouse: Betty Frances Shoaf
- Children: 4
- Education: Wake Forest University

Coy Clarence Privette (January 31, 1933 – March 23, 2015) was an American Baptist pastor, conservative activist, and politician active in the U.S. state of North Carolina.

In 1976, Privette was an unsuccessful Republican candidate for Governor of North Carolina, losing in a primary runoff to David Flaherty. He later served four terms in the North Carolina House of Representatives (1985–1992). In 1992, he ran unsuccessfully for the U.S. House of Representatives in North Carolina's 8th congressional district.

Privette served as a county commissioner in Cabarrus County, North Carolina from 1998 until 2010, when he did not seek re-election.

He was a longtime member of North Kannapolis Baptist Church, where he was pastor for 14 years and was later named pastor emeritus.

== Charges ==
In 2007, Privette was charged with six counts of aiding and abetting prostitution. Privette eventually resigned as president of North Carolina's Christian Action League and pleaded guilty to the charges.

The Cabarrus County Republican Party, the state Republican Party chair, and his fellow commissioners called on Privette to resign as a county commissioner. At one point, Privette said he would resign, although not because of the charges. Nevertheless, he completed his term, which continued through December 2010. On October 25, 2007, he was removed as vice president of programs by the membership of the Cabarrus County Republican Men's Club.
