= Arlan Andrews =

American engineer and writer (born 1940)

Arlan K. Andrews, Sr.
- Born: Arlan Keith Andrews; 1940 (age 85–86)
- Education: New Mexico State University (BS, MS, ScD)
- Occupations: Engineer; Writer
- Writing career
- Language: English
- Years active: 1971–present
- Genres: Science fiction

Arlan Keith Andrews, Sr. (born 1940) is an American engineer and writer of science fiction and non-fiction. He attended New Mexico State University, where he earned bachelor, master, and doctorate degrees in mechanical engineering. Since 1971, he has published three novels, three collections, over 30 non-fiction articles, almost 70 short fiction works, and multiple poems.

After helping to found the Libertarian Party of North Carolina, he was their candidate in the 1976 North Carolina gubernatorial election. In the early 1990s, he founded Sigma, a think tank of science fiction authors and academics that consults for the United States government. He was awarded a fellowship by the American Society of Mechanical Engineers in 1991 and 1992, the latter including a position in the Office of Science and Technology Policy.

His works have received Analog Awards for his non-fiction and short fiction from Analog Science Fiction and Fact, including a first place award for the non-fiction "Single Stage to Infinity!", and two-second place awards for the short fiction "Manufacturing Magic" and "Flow". "Flow" also received a nomination for the 2015 Hugo Award for Best Novella, finishing in second place.

== Biography ==
Arlan Keith Andrews was born in 1940. He attended New Mexico State University, earning a Bachelor of Science degree in 1964, a Master of Science degree in 1966, and a Doctor of Science degree in 1969, all in mechanical engineering. He has been a registered professional engineer since July 1969.

His first published fiction was "Asimov as Dirty Old Man", published in 1971 in Sandworm, a fanzine edited by Robert Vardeman. His first work published in Analog Science Fiction and Fact was "Glossolalia", which appeared in the July 1982 issue. Since then, he has published more than 35 works in Analog, including short fiction, non-fiction articles, and poetry. His fiction and non-fiction also appeared in magazines and anthologies such as Science Fiction Review, Science Fiction Age, the Journal of the British Interplanetary Society, Mechanical Engineering-CIME, Astrology Plus!, InfoWorld, Collaps Magazine, Amazing Stories, Pulphouse: The Hardback Magazine, Sci Phi Journal, Mensa Bulletin and Integra, the journal of Intertel. Andrews has published fiction under multiple variations of his name, including Arlan Keith Andrews, Sr., Arlan Andrews, Sr., and Arlan Andrews.

Andrews was one of the founders of the Libertarian Party of North Carolina (LPNC), and was their candidate for the 1976 North Carolina gubernatorial election, where he garnered 4,764 votes (0.29%). He founded Sigma, a think tank of science fiction authors and academics, in the early 1990s.

He was the guest of honor at the 2016 LPNC convention, which celebrated the party's 40th anniversary.

== Bibliography ==
=== Novels ===
- Timelost: Computer Adventure with Kris Andrews and Joe Giarratano (1983, Que Corporation)
- Valley of the Shaman: A Journey of Discovery (2012, Saywite Publications, ebook)
- Silicon Blood (2017, Hydra Publications, ISBN 978-1-942212-70-6)

=== Short fiction ===
Collections

- Other Heads and Other Tales (July 2011, Saywite Publications, ebook)
- Future Flash (2016, Hydra Publications, ISBN 978-1-942212-55-3)

== Awards and honors ==
Year	Organization	Award title, Category	Work	Result	Refs
1991	American Society of Mechanical Engineers	ASME Executive Branch Fellow, Technology Administration, US Department of Commerce	–	Awarded	
1992	Analog Science Fiction and Fact	Analog Award, Best Fact Article	"Manufacturing Magic"	2	
1992	American Society of Mechanical Engineers	ASME Executive Branch Fellow, Office of Science and Technology Policy	–	Awarded	
1993	Analog Science Fiction and Fact	Analog Award, Best Fact Article	"Single Stage to Infinity!"	1	
2014	Analog Science Fiction and Fact	Analog Award, Best Novella	"Flow"	2	
2015	Worldcon	Hugo Award, Best Novella	"Flow"	2	

== Sigma ==
Sigma is a think tank of science fiction authors and academics, founded by Andrews in the early 1990s, when he worked at the White House Science Office. Initial members of the group had one or more advanced degrees, though members since the founding have not been required to have them. Members have included Andrews, Greg Bear, Yoji Kondo, Larry Niven, Jerry Pournelle, and Sage Walker.
