= 1984 United States Senate election in North Carolina =

- November 6, 1984
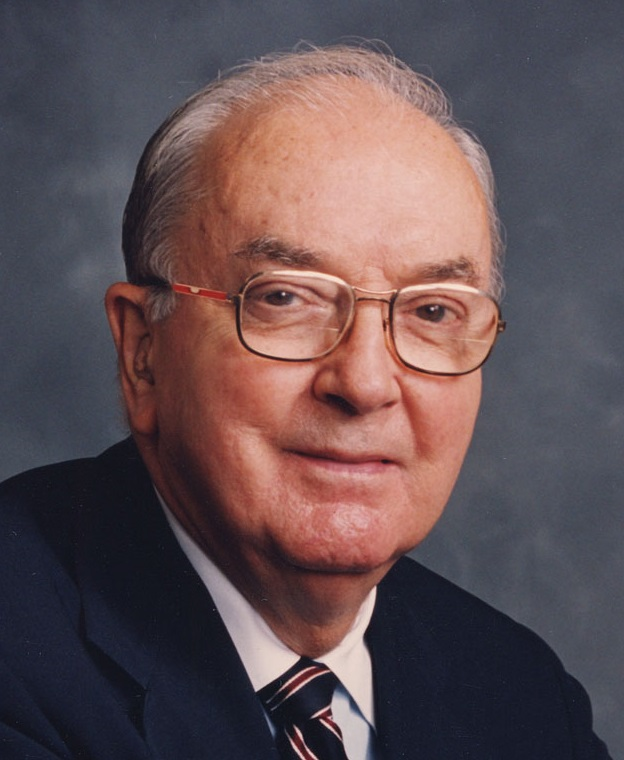

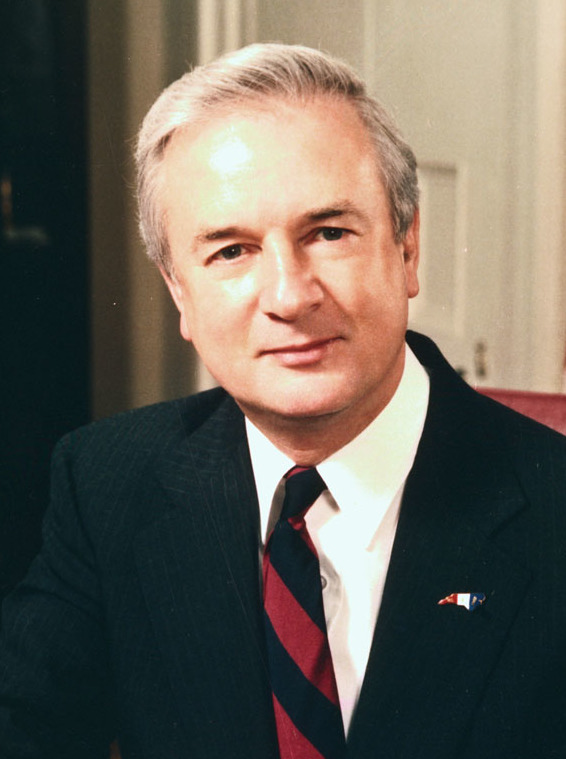
Nominee	Jesse Helms	Jim Hunt
Party	Republican	Democratic
Popular vote	1,156,768	1,070,488
Percentage	51.66%	47.81%
- County results Helms: 50– 60% 60–70% 70–80% Hunt: 40–50% 50–60% 60–70%
U.S. senator before election
Jesse Helms
Republican
Elected U.S. Senator
Jesse Helms
Republican

The North Carolina United States Senate election of 1984 was held on November 6, 1984, as part of the nationwide elections to the Senate, and coinciding with the 1984 presidential election. The election was a showdown between the Republican incumbent Jesse Helms and then-incumbent Democratic Governor Jim Hunt. This election was one of the most dramatic in 1984. In the end, Helms won the election, the most expensive non-presidential election in United States history up to that point, by a margin significantly reduced from the margin that Helms achieved in 1978.

Had Hunt been elected, He would have been the youngest elected U.S. Senator from North Carolina at the age of 47. That feat would be achieved 14 years later when John Edwards became the youngest elected Senator at 45 in 1998.

== Primaries ==
=== Republican primary ===
1984 North Carolina U.S. Senate Republican primary election
Party	Candidate	Votes	%
Republican	Jesse Helms (incumbent)	134,675	90.65%
Republican	George Wimbish	13,799	9.35%
Turnout		148,574	

=== Democratic primary ===
Hunt easily defeated businessman Thomas Allred, a supporter of Lyndon LaRouche, to win the Democratic nomination.

1984 North Carolina U.S. Senate Democratic primary election
Party	Candidate	Votes	%
Democratic	Jim Hunt	655,429	77.48%
Democratic	Thomas Allred	126,841	14.99%
Democratic	Harrill Jones	63,676	7.53%
Turnout		845,946	

== General election ==
=== Campaign ===
Hunt had a commanding lead in opinion polls for much of the campaign, with one poll in 1983 putting him nineteen points clear of Helms. However, that was changed by the most bitterly contested election in the country that year. Hunt ran a campaign ad connecting Helms to death squads in El Salvador through his association with the Nationalist Republican Alliance, for whom Roberto d'Aubuisson had recently run for the President of El Salvador. In the short time before election day, however, the highly popular incumbent US President Ronald Reagan gave Helms a significant boost by campaigning for him and running a local TV ad praising Helms and asking registered voters in North Carolina to re-elect him.

The election cost a total of $26,379,483 in total reported spending (over twelve times as much as the 1980 race), of which, 64% ($16.9m) was spent by Helms.

This election is remembered as "one of North Carolina's most infamous political battles" and "as a prototype of the no-holds-barred brawls that typify a strand of modern-day partisan politics, polarizing voters along distinct ideological lines."

=== Results ===
1984 North Carolina U.S. Senate election
Party	Candidate	Votes	%
Republican	Jesse Helms (incumbent)	1,156,768	51.66%
Democratic	Jim Hunt	1,070,488	47.81%
Libertarian	Bobby Emory	9,302	0.42%
Socialist Workers	Kate Daher	2,493	0.11%
Turnout		2,239,051	

A study by Voters Education Project in Atlanta showed that Helms received 63 percent of the white vote and was particularly successful in small towns and rural areas, while receiving less than 1 percent of the black vote in 35 almost-all-black precincts. Hunt got 37 percent of the white and 98.8 percent of the black vote, according to VEP. But only 61 percent of registered blacks voted, down from 63 percent in 1980."

Endorsements

Jesse Helms (R)

Executive branch officials

- Ronald Reagan, 40th president of the United States (1981–1989)

== See also ==
- United States Senate elections, 1984
