= Love Valley, North Carolina =

- Town
- Location within North Carolina Location within the United States
- Coordinates: 35°59′15″N 80°58′26″W
- Country: United States
- State: North Carolina
- County: Iredell
- Chartered: April 2, 1963
- Founder: Andy Barker

Government
  - Type: Mayor-council
  - Mayor: Timothy Meadows (R)

Area
  - Total: 1.02 sq mi (2.65 km^{2})
  - Land: 1.02 sq mi (2.65 km^{2})
  - Water: 0 sq mi (0.00 km^{2})
- Elevation: 1,476 ft (450 m)

Population (2020)
  - Total: 154
  - Density: 150.5/sq mi (58.12/km^{2})
- Time zone: UTC-5 (Eastern (EST))
  - Summer (DST): UTC-4 (EDT)
- ZIP code: 28625
- Area code: 704
- FIPS code: 37-39420
- GNIS feature ID: 2406050
- Website: www.lovevalley.com

Love Valley is a town in Iredell County, North Carolina, United States. As of the 2020 census, Love Valley had a population of 154.

== History ==
Love Valley is a small town located in a remote valley in the Brushy Mountains of northwestern North Carolina. Its creation in 1954 marked the fulfillment of a dream for the founder Andy Barker. Barker developed two visions as a young man—he wanted to build a Christian community and to be a cowboy. In 1954, he combined those visions to create an Old West-style village in the hills of northwestern Iredell County. The town was incorporated on April 2, 1963.

Modeled after the Old West towns seen in countless Hollywood films, Love Valley boasts a saloon, general store, hitching posts, and rodeos. Automobiles are not allowed inside the town limits; people still use horses and horse-drawn vehicles to travel in the town. A small, nondenominational Christian church sits on a hill overlooking the town, thus emphasizing Barker's vision of a Christian utopia. The town garnered its share of controversy in the 1960s and 1970s, including around the "Love Valley Rock Festival", which local farmers complained brought drug addicts and other "troublemakers" to the area. However, over the last two decades, the town has experienced considerable growth and is now known as a popular gathering spot for horse lovers and horseback riders. There are miles of horseback riding trails in the surrounding Brushy Mountains.

== Geography ==
Love Valley is located in the Brushy Mountains of northwestern Iredell County. It is 16 miles (26 km) north of Statesville, the Iredell County seat, and 23 miles (37 km) southeast of Wilkesboro by road through the Brushy Mountains.

According to the United States Census Bureau, the town has a total area of 0.62 square miles (1.6 km^{2}), of which 5,366 square metres (1.3 acres), or 0.33%, are water. The town's area drains southwest to Snow Creek, part of the South Yadkin River watershed.

== Demographics ==
Historical population
Census	Pop.	Note	%±
1970	40		—
1980	55		37.5%
1990	67		21.8%
2000	30		−55.2%
2010	90		200.0%
2020	154		71.1%
U.S. Decennial Census

As of the census of 2010, there were 90 people, 17 households, and 9 families residing in the town. The population density was 450.0 inhabitants per square mile (173.7/km^{2}). There were 31 housing units at an average density of 154.0 per square mile (59.5/km^{2}). The racial makeup of the town is 98.9% White.

There were 17 households, out of which 11.8% had children under the age of 18 living with them, 47.1% were married couples living together, 11.8% had a female householder with no husband present, and 41.2% were non-families. 41.2% of all households were made up of individuals, and 17.6% had someone living alone who was 65 years of age or older. The average household size was 1.76, and the average family size was 2.20.

In the town, the population was spread out, with 6.7% under the age of 18, 6.7% from 18 to 24, 20.0% from 25 to 44, 36.7% from 45 to 64, and 30.0% who were 65 years of age or older. The median age was 55 years. For every 100 females, there were 87.5 males. For every 100 females age 18 and over, there were 86.7 males.

The median income for a household in the town was $24,375, and the median income for a family was $25,313. Males had a median income of $0 versus $0 for females. The per capita income for the town was $9,848. 15.4% of families and 31.0% of the population lived below the poverty line, including 50.0% of those under 18 and none of those aged 64 and over.

== See also ==
- List of American utopian communities
- Mackinac Island, another American settlement that forbids automobiles to a large extent
