= Edward O'Herron Jr. =

Personal details
- Born: 1915 Baltimore, Maryland, U.S.
- Died: 2006 (aged 90–91)
- Party: United States Democratic Party
- Spouse: Margaret Aston 'Dosty' Blackman
- Parent(s): Edward O'Herron, Sr. (father)
- Education: U.S. Naval Academy; University of North Carolina at Chapel Hill
- Occupation: Former chairman of the Eckerd drug store chain
- Known for: First legislation to create community colleges in North Carolina

Military service
- Allegiance: United States
- Branch/service: U.S. Marine Corps
- Battles/wars: Iwo Jima during World War II
- Awards: Silver Star

Edward Michael O'Herron Jr. (1915–2006) was a prominent American businessman and politician. He was a chairman of the Eckerd drug store chain.

== Early life ==
O'Herron was born in Baltimore, Maryland, but grew up in Charlotte, North Carolina. His father, Edward O'Herron, Sr., built up the Eckerd chain, named for his father-in-law, who opened a drug store in Erie, Pennsylvania, in 1898.

The younger O'Herron attended the U.S. Naval Academy but left so he could marry Margaret Aston 'Dosty' Blackman, who he would be married to for over sixty-five years. He later graduated from the University of North Carolina at Chapel Hill. In World War II, O'Herron served in the U.S. Marine Corps and saw action at Iwo Jima. He was awarded the Silver Star.

== Retail career ==
After the war, O'Herron returned to Charlotte and worked with his father in the North Carolina Eckerd chain.

In 1977, the North Carolina operation merged with the Florida Eckerd chain, formerly run by Jack Eckerd. The combination was the biggest in drug store history and brought the company's store count to 766, making it the second largest drug chain in the United States.

== Political career ==
In the 1950s, O'Herron, a Democrat, was elected to three terms in the North Carolina General Assembly. There, he introduced the first legislation to create community colleges in the state. He also supported private education through service on the boards of Converse College and St. Andrews Presbyterian College.

In 1976, O'Herron unsuccessfully ran for Governor of North Carolina, losing in the Democratic primary to Jim Hunt, who won 53.4% to O'Herron's 23.3% and 18.0% for George Wood.
