= 1968 North Carolina gubernatorial election =

- November 5, 1968
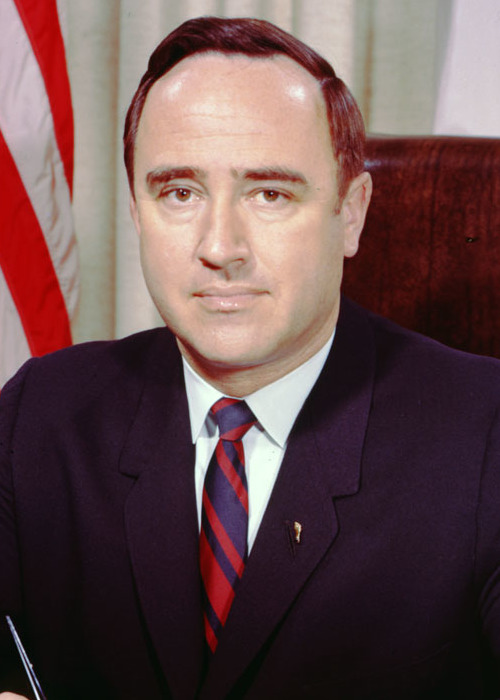

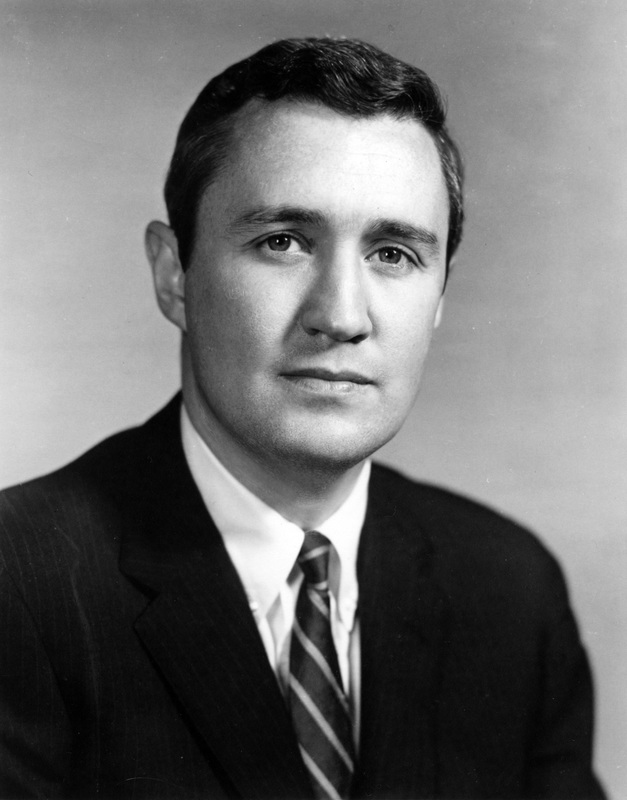
Nominee	Robert W. Scott	Jim Gardner
Party	Democratic	Republican
Popular vote	821,233	737,075
Percentage	52.70%	47.30%
- County results Scott: 50–60% 60–70% 70–80% Gardner: 50–60% 60–70% 70–80%
Governor before election
Dan K. Moore
Democratic
Elected Governor
Robert W. Scott
Democratic

The 1968 North Carolina gubernatorial election was held on November 5, 1968. Democratic nominee Robert W. Scott defeated Republican nominee Jim Gardner with 52.70% of the vote.

== Primary elections ==
Primary elections were held on May 4, 1968.

=== Democratic primary ===
==== Candidates ====
- Robert W. Scott, incumbent Lieutenant Governor
- J. Melville Broughton Jr., attorney and chair of the North Carolina Democratic Party
- Reginald A. Hawkins, civil rights activist and dentist

24.4% of the voting age population participated in the Democratic primary.

==== Results ====
Democratic primary results
Party	Candidate	Votes	%
Democratic	Robert W. Scott	337,368	48.12
Democratic	J. Melville Broughton Jr.	233,924	33.37
Democratic	Reginald A. Hawkins	129,808	18.52
Total votes		701,100	100.00

=== Republican primary ===
==== Candidates ====
- Jim Gardner, U.S. Representative
- John L. Stickley

5.4% of the voting age population participated in the Republican primary.

==== Results ====
Republican primary results
Party	Candidate	Votes	%
Republican	Jim Gardner	113,584	72.78
Republican	John L. Stickley	42,483	27.22
Total votes		156,067	100.00

== General election ==
=== Candidates ===
- Robert W. Scott, Democratic
- Jim Gardner, Republican

=== Results ===
1968 North Carolina gubernatorial election
Party	Candidate	Votes	%	±%
Democratic	Robert W. Scott	821,233	52.70%	
Republican	Jim Gardner	737,075	47.30%	
Majority		84,158		
Turnout		1,558,308		
Democratic hold		Swing		

== Works cited ==
- Steed, Robert; Moreland, Laurence; Baker, Tod, eds. (1980). Party Politics in the South. Praeger Publishers. ISBN 0030565863.
