= Andy Barker (philanthropist) =

American theme town founder (1924-2011)

1st Mayor of Love Valley, North Carolina
- In office 1963–2011
- Preceded by: Office established
- Succeeded by: Anthony Kennedy

Personal details
- Born: Jeter Andrew Barker Jr. July 4, 1924 Charlotte, North Carolina
- Died: July 11, 2011 (aged 87) Love Valley, North Carolina
- Resting place: Love Valley Presbyterian Church Cemetery
- Party: Democratic
- Occupation: Military veteran, contractor, politician, and philanthropist
- Known for: creator and founder of the cowboy themed town of Love Valley, North Carolina

Jeter Andrew Barker Jr. (July 4, 1924 – July 11, 2011) was a philanthropist and the creator, founder, and former mayor of the cowboy themed town of Love Valley, North Carolina in Iredell County.

== Early life ==
Barker was born in Mecklenburg County, North Carolina on July 4, 1924. As a child growing up in Charlotte, North Carolina, he wanted to be a cowboy. His teachers told him that there were no cowboy towns in North Carolina. When he was older, he and his father (Jeter Andrew Barker Sr.) ran a lucrative construction company, JA Construction, in Charlotte. He was a military veteran of the Army Corps of Engineers in World War II. He attempted to run for Governor of North Carolina in the Democratic primary on two occasions in 1976 and 1984, and for the Senate once.

== Love Valley ==
His wife Ellenora Spratt Barker, daughter Tonda (age six), and son Jeter Andrew "Jet" Barker III (age two) moved to a little one-room shack in North Iredell County in April 1954. There, he fulfilled his childhood dream when he built and founded the town of Love Valley in 1954 as a cowboy themed town. Love Valley was incorporated in 1963. In 1970, Love Valley hosted a rock festival in which the Allman Brothers Band played. In the late 1990s, the Love Valley Horseman's Association and Love Valley Mule Association were formed. These associations are responsible for many of the events that take place in Love Valley.

== Death ==
At the time of his death on July 11, 2011, Barker was mayor of Love Valley for all but six of the town's 48 years of incorporation. His father of the same name (went by A.J. Barker) was Love Valley's first mayor. Two other men had one-term stints as the top elected official during periods when Barker was retired. He was one of the longest serving mayors in the United States. Barker and his wife, who died in 2018, were buried at the Love Valley Presbyterian Church Cemetery, which he built in Love Valley as the first structure in town.

== Honors ==
Barker received several awards:

- Cowboy Hall of Fame
- Southeastern Rodeo Hall of Fame
- Marquis Who's Who of America
- Mayors Hall of Fame, 1994

== See also ==
- 1976 North Carolina gubernatorial election
- 1984 North Carolina gubernatorial election
