= Jim Gardner (politician) =

American politician (born 1933)

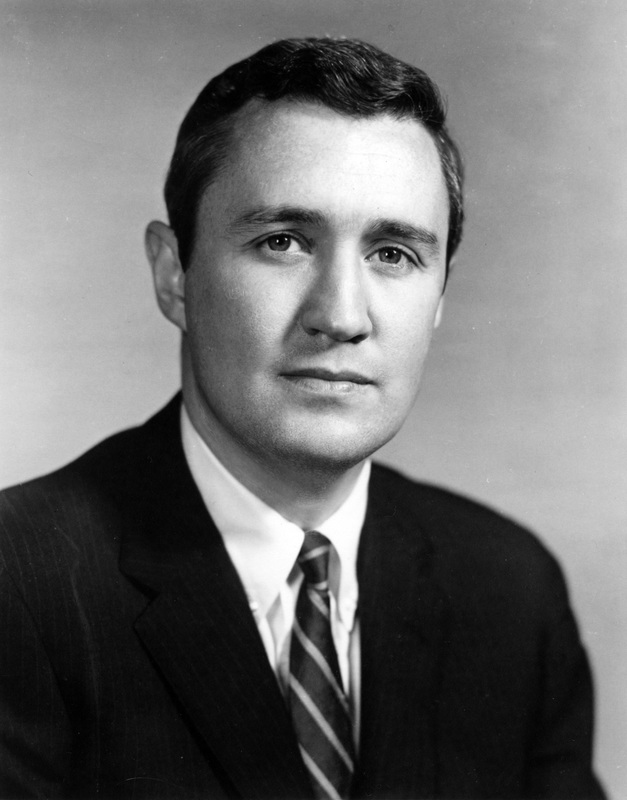
- Gardner in the 1960s

30th Lieutenant Governor of North Carolina
- In office January 7, 1989 – January 9, 1993
- Governor: James G. Martin
- Preceded by: Robert B. Jordan
- Succeeded by: Dennis A. Wicker

Member of the U.S. House of Representatives from North Carolina's 4th district
- In office January 3, 1967 – January 3, 1969
- Preceded by: Harold D. Cooley
- Succeeded by: Nick Galifianakis

Personal details
- Born: James Carson Gardner; April 8, 1933 (age 93) Rocky Mount, North Carolina, U.S.
- Party: Democratic (before 1962); Republican (1962–present)
- Education: North Carolina State University

Military service
- Allegiance: United States
- Branch: United States Army
- Service years: 1953–1955

James Carson Gardner (born April 8, 1933) is an American businessman and politician from North Carolina who served as a Republican member of the United States House of Representatives for just one term from 1967 to 1969 and served as the 30th lieutenant governor from 1989 to 1993.

== Early life ==
Gardner was born in Rocky Mount, North Carolina, on April 8, 1933. He attended public schools and North Carolina State University. Gardner served in the United States Army from 1953 to 1955.

== Business career ==
In May 1961, Gardner, along with Joseph Leonard Rawls Jr., opened the first franchise store of the fast food restaurant Hardee's in Rocky Mount, North Carolina. Later, in 1968, he bought the troubled Houston Mavericks of the American Basketball Association and after finishing their second season in the ABA, moved them to North Carolina a year later as the Carolina Cougars. He would also be named an interim commissioner of the American Basketball Association following the resignation of former star center George Mikan.

== Political career ==
Gardner first made a splash when he ran for Congress in 1964 and nearly defeated 30-year Democratic incumbent Harold D. Cooley, the powerful chairman of the United States House Committee on Agriculture. Gardner had grown up as a Democrat, but became a Republican in 1962. The GOP was gaining momentum in the South at the time after barely even existing there for much of the 20th century. In 1966, Gardner (by then chairman of the North Carolina Republican Party) toppled Cooley by a shocking 13-point margin to represent a district that included Raleigh as well as his home in Rocky Mount.

He was an unsuccessful candidate for Governor of North Carolina in 1968, 1972, and 1992. In both 1968 and in 1992, he won the Republican nomination, but lost to Democrats Robert W. Scott and Jim Hunt, respectively. In 1972, he lost the nomination to James Holshouser, the first of only two Republican governors of North Carolina in the 20th century.

=== Lieutenant governor ===
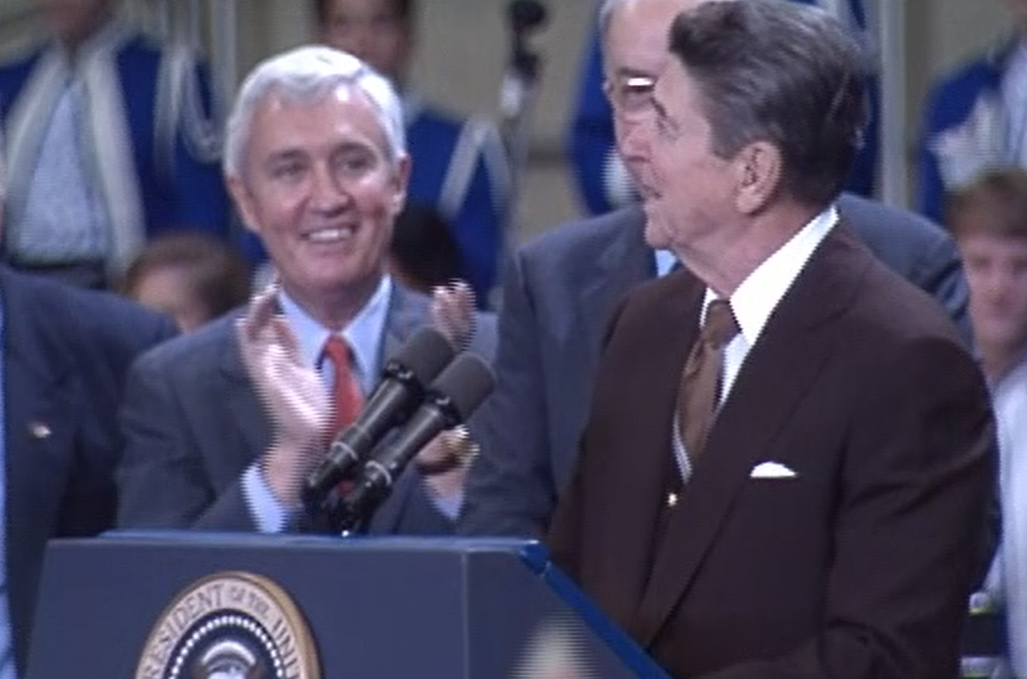
Gardner (left) and President Ronald Reagan at a 1988 campaign rally

In 1988, Gardner defeated Democrat Tony Rand and became the first Republican elected lieutenant governor since Charles A. Reynolds, who served from 1897 to 1901. Gardner served from January 1989 to January 1993, during the second term of Republican Governor James G. Martin. In response to the election of Republican Gardner, the Democratic-controlled North Carolina General Assembly transferred many of the powers of the Lieutenant Governor over to the President pro tempore of the North Carolina Senate.

=== Political activity after retirement ===
In September 2011, Gardner endorsed the (ultimately unsuccessful) 2012 candidacy of Wake County Commissioner Tony Gurley for lieutenant governor. As an "elder politician," Gardner has been called one of the "Four Jims" of the North Carolina Republican establishment, the others being former Governors Holshouser and Martin and former United States House of Representatives member Jim Broyhill (Holshouser and Broyhill have since died). In January 2013, Gardner served as master of ceremonies at the inauguration ceremony for newly elected Gov. Pat McCrory, Lt. Gov. Dan Forest and other members of the North Carolina Council of State. The ceremony celebrated the return of Republicans to the governor's office for the first time since Gardner's defeat in 1992. Forest also became the first Republican Lieutenant Governor since Gardner (Democrats Dennis A. Wicker, Bev Perdue, and Walter Dalton served in the post after Gardner).

At age 79, Gardner came out of retirement when McCrory appointed him chairman of the North Carolina Alcoholic Beverage Control Commission in 2013. He retired from the position on February 8, 2017.

U.S. House of Representatives
Preceded by Harold D. Cooley	Member of the U.S. House of Representatives from North Carolina's 4th congressional district 1967–1969	Succeeded by Nick Galifianakis
Party political offices
Preceded by Robert L. Gavin	Republican nominee for Governor of North Carolina; 1968	Succeeded by Jim Holshouser
Preceded by John H. Carrington	Republican nominee for Lieutenant Governor of North Carolina; 1988	Succeeded by Art Pope
Preceded by James G. Martin	Republican nominee for Governor of North Carolina; 1992	Succeeded by Robin Hayes
Political offices
Preceded by Robert B. Jordan	Lieutenant Governor of North Carolina; 1989–1993	Succeeded by Dennis A. Wicker
U.S. order of precedence (ceremonial)
Preceded by Brandon Williams as Former US Representative	Order of precedence of the United States as Former US Representative	Succeeded by Charles Robin Britt as Former US Representative
