= James Holshouser =

American politician (1934–2013)

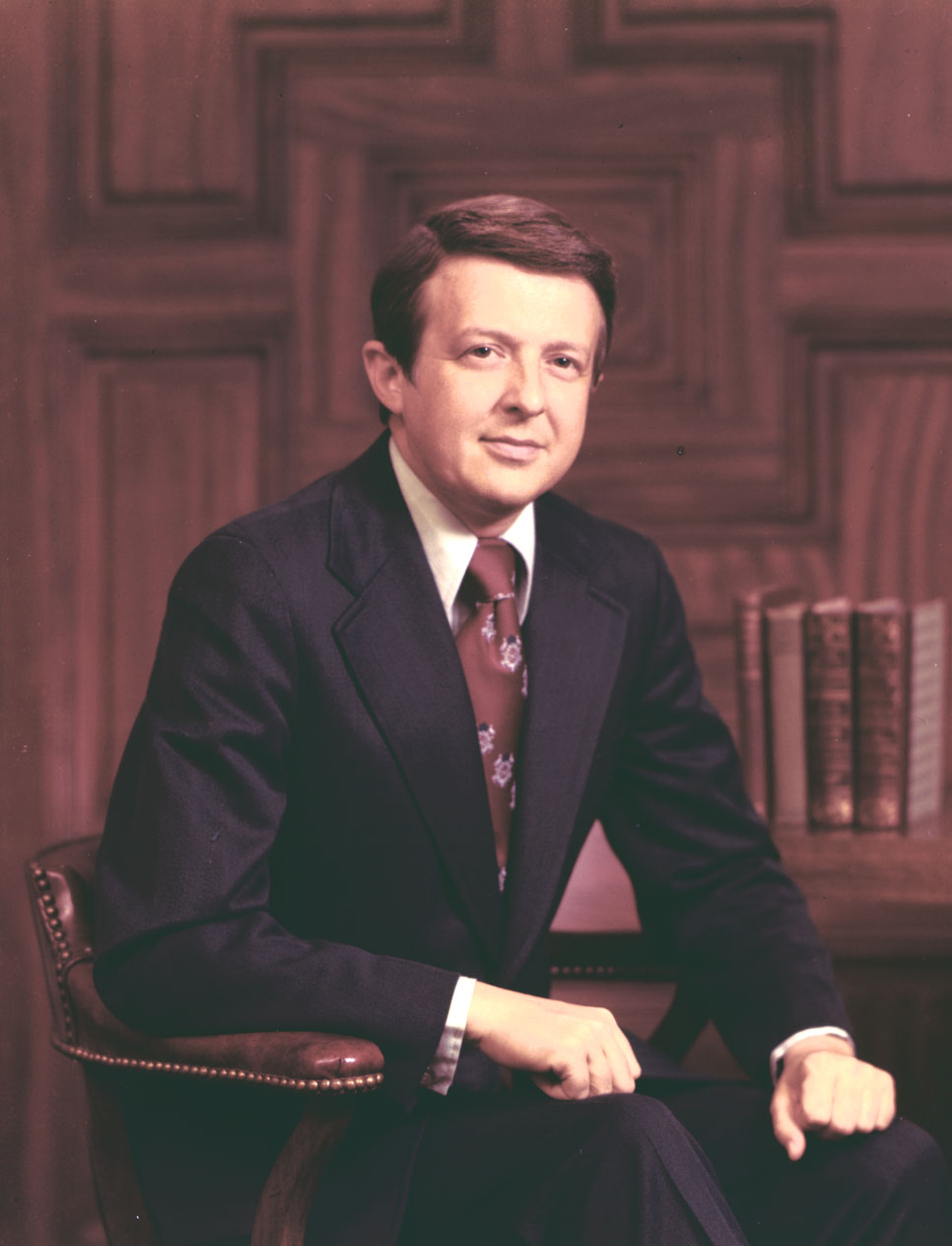

68th Governor of North Carolina
- In office January 5, 1973 – January 8, 1977
- Lieutenant: Jim Hunt
- Preceded by: Robert Scott
- Succeeded by: Jim Hunt

Chair of the North Carolina Republican Party
- In office 1966–1971
- Preceded by: Jim Gardner
- Succeeded by: Frank Rouse

Member of the North Carolina House of Representatives from the 44th district
- In office 1969–1973
- Preceded by: Mack Stewart Isaac
- Succeeded by: Ernest Bryan Messer; Liston Bryan Ramsey

Member of the North Carolina House of Representatives from Watauga County
- In office 1963–1967
- Preceded by: Murray Harris Coffey
- Succeeded by: District abolished

Personal details
- Born: James Eubert Holshouser Jr. October 8, 1934 Boone, North Carolina, U.S.
- Died: June 17, 2013 (aged 78) Pinehurst, North Carolina, U.S.
- Party: Republican
- Spouse: Patricia Ann Hollingsworth (m. 1961; died 2006)
- Children: 1
- Education: Davidson College (BS); University of North Carolina, Chapel Hill (LLB)

James Eubert Holshouser Jr. (October 8, 1934 – June 17, 2013) was an American lawyer and politician who served as the 68th governor of North Carolina from 1973 to 1977. He was the first Republican candidate to be elected as governor of the state since 1896. Born in Boone, North Carolina, Holshouser initially sought to become a sports journalist before deciding to pursue a law degree. While in law school he developed an interest in politics and in 1962 he was elected to the North Carolina House of Representatives where he focused on restructuring government and higher education institutions, and drug abuse legislation. Made chairman of the North Carolina Republican Party in March 1966, he established the organization's first permanent staff and gained prominence by opposing a cigarette tax.

Holshouser ran for the office of Governor of North Carolina in 1972, winning the Republican nomination and narrowly defeating his Democratic opponent in the general election. Inaugurated in January 1973, he fired many incumbent state employees to accommodate the awarding of patronage to hundreds of Republicans who had been unable to work in the state administration under Democratic control, appointed the first woman in a cabinet-level position in the state's history, and enacted hundreds of cost-cutting measures. Though not empowered with veto power and facing a Democrat-dominated legislature, he cultivated a working relationship with Lieutenant Governor Jim Hunt. Together, they backed the expansion of the state's kindergarten program and environmental legislation and unsuccessfully pursued the ratification of the Equal Rights Amendment. Holshouser governed as a pragmatic centrist, and his control over the state Republican organization was undermined by conservative supporters of U.S. Senator Jesse Helms. Leaving office in January 1977, he practiced law in Southern Pines and served on the University of North Carolina Board of Governors before dying in 2013.

== Early life ==
James Eubert Holshouser Jr. was born on October 8, 1934, in Boone, North Carolina, United States, to James E. Holshouser and Virginia Dayvault Holshouser. His father was an active member of the Republican Party who attended party meetings and served on the North Carolina State Board of Elections and as a United States Attorney under President Dwight Eisenhower. His mother was a registered member of the Democratic Party, though she eventually left the party before becoming a Republican in 1972. People in Watauga County described the Holshouser family as "good livers", meaning they lived comfortably and had respectable social standing. James Jr. was a sickly child and suffered from asthma and periodic afflictions of pneumonia, preventing him from pursuing an interest in sports.

Holshouser enrolled at Appalachian High School in 1948. He served as senior class president (he was elected unopposed), editor of the school newspaper, and was a member of the National Honor Society. Graduating in June 1952, he attended Davidson College for undergraduate studies, majoring in history. He edited the school newspaper, wrote for the yearbook, and was a member of a fraternity, a literary society, and the international relations club. He strongly considered becoming a sports writer, and during his senior year he worked on the sports section of The Charlotte Observer. He later figured making a career out of sports would cause him to tire of them, so he decided to do what his father had done and become a lawyer. He graduated from Davidson College in 1956 and enrolled at the University of North Carolina School of Law in September 1957, earning his law degree in 1960. He subsequently joined his father's law practice in Boone and married Patricia Hollingsworth on June 17, 1961. They had one daughter, Virginia, born in 1963.

== Early political career ==
Holshouser circa 1963

Though politics was a "casual part of life" in his household while growing up, Holshouser paid little interest in pursuing a political career for much of his early life. He grew more interested in public affairs while at law school, particularly in court reform. During this time he began attending sessions of the North Carolina General Assembly. In 1962 he was elected chairman of the Watauga County Young Republicans.

Holshouser was elected in November 1962 to the North Carolina House of Representatives representing Watauga County, campaigning on a platform of court reform, low taxes, and creating an automobile inspection law. He was sworn in on February 7, 1963. Throughout his tenure he focused on restructuring government and higher education institutions, and drug abuse legislation. He became the Republican floor leader in the House in 1965, thus becoming the highest-ranking Republican public official in the state. Skipping the 1967 session, he returned to the House in 1969. Made chairman of the North Carolina Republican Party in March 1966, Holshouser directed Republican Richard Nixon's 1968 presidential campaign in North Carolina and rose to statewide prominence the following year when he opposed Governor Robert W. Scott's plan to tax cigarettes. He also established the party organization's first permanent staff. He retired from the party chairmanship in November 1971 to focus on a gubernatorial campaign in 1972. One of his friends, Harry S. Dent Sr., offered to help him get appointed as general counsel for the United States Navy, but he turned the offer down.

== Gubernatorial career ==
=== Election ===
Holshouser declared his candidacy for the office of Governor of North Carolina in the 1972 election on November 15, 1971. Suffering from kidney disease, he ran in spite of his doctor's concerns about his health. In the Republican primary he faced Jim Gardner, a conservative U.S. Representative who hailed from eastern North Carolina and had run as the Republican candidate in 1968. Holshouser focused his campaign on the traditionally Republican counties in the mountainous west and the urban Piedmont. Gardner won the first primary by a small margin, 84,906 votes to Holshouser's 83,637, while minor candidates took 2,040 votes. Holshouser called for a runoff, and in the second round voter participation dropped, giving Holshouser a victory by 1,782 votes.

Holshouser campaigned on a platform of raising teachers' salaries, reducing class sizes, expanding the public kindergarten program, building new roads, supporting a war on drugs, and opposing taxes on gasoline and tobacco. Despite the reservations of his wife, he authorized the broadcasting of an ad declaring his opposition to desegregation busing at the encouragement of his media consultant, Roger Ailes. He narrowly defeated Democrat Skipper Bowles in the general election, 767,470 votes to 729,104, likely benefitting from the coattails of Republican Richard Nixon's large victory in North Carolina in the presidential election. Holshouser led in the traditionally-Republican mountain and western Piedmont counties, while also gaining a majority in the Charlotte, Winston-Salem, Raleigh, and Wilmington metro areas. He performed well among women and younger voters, while also appealing more to black voters than more conservative Republicans such as Gardner and U.S. Senator Jesse Helms. Bowles had also been harmed by a fractious primary. Both Republicans and Democrats generally considered Holshouser's victory a "fluke". He was inaugurated on January 5, 1973. At age 38, he was the state's youngest governor since the 19th century and the first Republican governor since Daniel Lindsay Russell was elected in 1896.

=== Executive actions ===
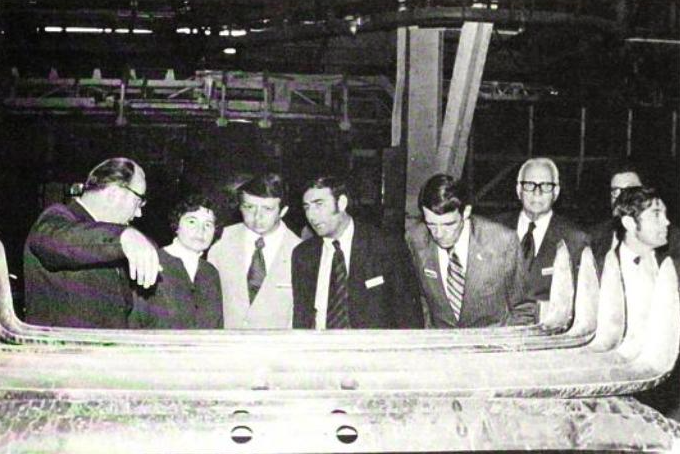
Holshouser (third from left) with a North Carolina economic delegation in Moscow, September 1973

Holshouser lacked executive experience upon assuming gubernatorial office, and had a tendency to react to others' proposals rather than create his own. Upon taking office, he fired many incumbent state employees to accommodate the awarding of patronage to hundreds of Republicans who had been unable to work in the state administration under Democratic control; 100 employees in the Department of Transportation were removed. Holshouser's first executive order established the Governor's Efficiency Study Commission. After months of study the board recommended 700 cost-cutting measures, including five-year license plates, use of compact cars by state agencies, and centralized printing services. Holshouser's administration adopted about 600 of the suggestions, and he later estimated that the changes saved the state government $80 million annually. Holshouser also pursued a much more active role in the state budgeting process than his predecessors, regularly attending and presiding over sessions of the Advisory Budget Commission.

Holshouser issued a total of 21 executive orders during his tenure. To mitigate the effects of the 1973 oil crisis, he issued instructions to lower speed limits and reduce heating in government buildings. Citing the governor's constitutional prerogative to reorganize departments, he moved the Office of Child Development from the Department of Administration to the Department of Health and Human Services. In 1975 he established an office in Washington, D.C., to coordinate actions between the state and federal governments. During his tenure the Executive Mansion underwent renovations, and for nine months he and his wife lived in a private residence while the work was completed. He also declined to use the governor's office in the North Carolina State Capitol aside from ceremonial purposes.

As governor, Holshouser served as a member of the National Governors Association, chairman of the Southern Regional Education Board, co-chairman of the Coastal Plains Regional Commission, and chairman of the Southern Growth Policies Board. Concerned about citizen confusion and disillusionment with the increasing complexity of government, he created the Office of Governor's Ombudsman on March 21, 1973, to field questions and complaints from the public about state administration. He appointed Grace Rohrer as Commissioner of the Department of Art, History and Culture, the first woman in a cabinet-level position in the state's history, and designated a special assistant for minority affairs. He also appointed a commission to raise money to restore the Old Main building at Pembroke State University following its destruction by fire. Holshouser publicly supported the federally-backed planned community of Soul City to improve economic opportunity for blacks and boost minority electoral support for Republicans. He led a trade delegation to Moscow in September 1973. He appointed Republican James H. Carson Jr. to serve as North Carolina Attorney General in August 1974 following Democratic incumbent Robert Burren Morgan's resignation and appointed Republican Thomas Avery Nye Jr. to become North Carolina Commissioner of Labor in September 1975 to fill a vacancy created by the death of the previous Democratic incumbent, William C. Creel. He also filled two vacancies on the North Carolina Court of Appeals and four on the North Carolina Superior Court.

=== Legislative actions ===
With no veto power over the Democratic-dominated General Assembly, Holshouser tried to avoid political conflict with legislators except over explicitly partisan issues. Party association aside, Holshouser maintained a good relationship with the Assembly, as most of its members had known him when he was a state representative, including Senate majority leader Gordon Allen and Speaker of the House James E. Ramsey. He enjoyed a good working relationship with Lieutenant Governor Jim Hunt, who held sway in the legislature, and during their first two years in office they minimized partisanship in dealing with each other. In some instances the legislature attempted to weaken the powers of his office but Allen, Ramsey, and Hunt—all aspiring to be governor one day—stopped these challenges. The legislature rejected his 1973 proposal to authorize governors to run for a consecutive term.

Holshouser came into office when North Carolina had a $265 million budget surplus, which enabled him to fulfill some of his campaign promises. He consulted Hunt on budget proposals and incorporated Hunt's plan to expand kindergarten in the state educational system in his January 1973 budget. The plan was passed into law, and was gradually phased in so that by 1977 all children in North Carolina would be enrolled in kindergarten. His budget also expanded funding for state parks and he worked with Hunt to create the Coastal Area Management Act to control development along the Eastern Seaboard. Holshouser supported a similar bill for mountain regions, but failed to secure the support of Republican legislators to pass it. The two encouraged the state legislature to ratify the Equal Rights Amendment to the United States Constitution, but it failed approval. New legislative proposals from Holshouser decreased after the state's budgetary situation tightened in 1975.

=== Political affairs ===
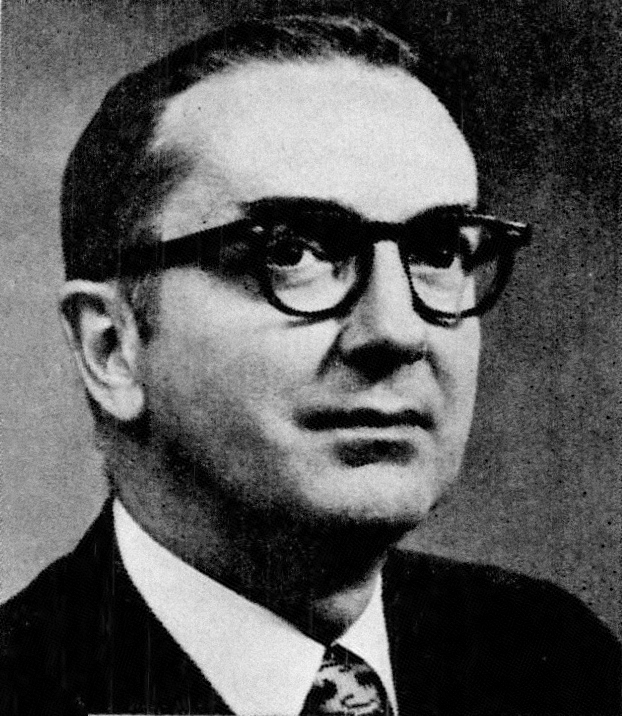
During his time as governor, Holshouser was engaged in an intra-party rivalry with conservative followers of U.S. Senator Jesse Helms (pictured).

In the mid-20th century the two major political parties in North Carolina had little ideological basis; party identification was generally a matter of generational descent tracing back to loyalties from the American Civil War. By the 1970s the national Democratic Party had drifted leftward on economic and social questions, leading some southern conservative Democrats to join the Republican Party. Since 1964, the Republican Party had nationally diverged into a moderate wing and a conservative wing. Holshouser governed as a pragmatic centrist, and his control over the state party was tenuous. In the 1972 election he had campaigned independently of Helms. The two maintained cordial relations with each other, though the tensions between their respective wings for the party strained communication between them for decades. Whether they were truly of much different ideological persuasions is unknown, though public perception of each man was different. State Senator Phil Kirk opined, "Holsouser is probably as conservative as Helms but not as vociferous." When asked about his beliefs, Holshouser said, "I find people on the left view me as a conservative and people on the right view me as a moderate or maybe moderate conservative. I have never viewed myself left of center." A feud began in June 1973 when one of Holshouser's close aides, Gene Anderson, fired several conservative Democrats from state office, even though they were ideologically similar to Helms' supporters. Republican Party chairman Frank Rouse, a conservative who had supported Gardner and Helms, visited Holshouser to ask him to fire Anderson. The governor refused, and successfully backed Tom Bennet to replace Rouse in the autumn of 1973.

In 1974 an electoral backlash against Republicans—in part due to the Watergate scandal—ousted many legislators in North Carolina. Holshouser's interim appointee for attorney general, Carson, was also defeated. All of his judicial appointees, save for a single Democrat, lost re-election. The governor continued to maintain good relations with Democratic legislators, but began experiencing more opposition from Helms' wing of the Republican Party. This was in part due Holshouser's backing of William C. Stevens—a relative of Republican Congressman Jim Broyhill—for nomination in the 1974 U.S. Senate race, instead of Helms' choice, State Senator Hamilton C. Horton.

Holshouser and party regulars supported Gerald Ford for president in 1976, with the governor serving as Ford's southern campaign chairman. Helms supported the more conservative Ronald Reagan, who Holshouser publicly appealed to, to drop out of the race, to preserve party unity. According to legal scholar Thomas Healy, "The Republican primary in North Carolina thus became a referendum on Holshouser." The National Congressional Club, a political action committee associated with Helms, produced advertisements attacking Holshouser to bolster Reagan's position. Reagan won the North Carolina presidential primary, and the Republican state convention—under influence from Helms—refused to appoint Holshouser or Broyhill as a delegate to the 1976 Republican National Convention. Holshouser was booed when he addressed the state Republican convention. He attended the national convention anyway, but did not sit with the North Carolina delegation. Legally restricted to one term, Holshouser was succeeded by Hunt as governor on January 8, 1977.

== Later life ==
After leaving office, Holshouser returned to the practice of law, splitting his time between firms in Boone and Southern Pines. In 1978 he moved to the latter town. He secured a pilot's license and flew a Cessna 172 between the two locales. He worked for several years as the official attorney of the Moore County Board of Commissioners. He was elected to the Board of Governors of the University of North Carolina in 1979, and later served as a member emeritus. He also served on the Boards of St. Andrews Presbyterian College in Laurinburg and Davidson College. Continuing to suffer kidney problems that were treated with dialysis, he underwent kidney transplantation in 1986. As a result, he gave his support to organ transplant organizations and served on the board of directors of the United Network for Organ Sharing.

Holshouser joined with Hunt and former governor Terry Sanford in 1977 in supporting the amending of the North Carolina Constitution to allow gubernatorial succession. He decided against pursuing reelection to the governorship, later explaining, "[My wife and I] were very, very tired by the end of 1976. And we were ready for a break from politics, ready to sort of get out of the limelight and back in the private sector because I never really anticipated a political career." Out of office he served on several steering and advisory committees for Republican gubernatorial and senatorial candidates. In 1984 he campaigned for James G. Martin's election as governor and two years later he led a group, Citizens for a Conservative Court, which sought to block James G. Exum's election as Chief Justice of the North Carolina Supreme Court. He also served as Gardner's legislative liaison while the latter was lieutenant governor. In 1997 he and Sanford opened a law firm together. He served on Pat McCrory's political transition team after the latter was elected governor.

Holshouser's wife died in 2006. He died on the morning of June 17, 2013, at First Health of the Carolinas Medical Center in Pinehurst following a decline in his health. His body was cremated and a funeral was held for him on June 21 at Brownson Memorial Presbyterian Church in Southern Pines.

== Legacy and honors ==
A building bearing Holshouser's name was erected at the North Carolina State Fairgrounds in 1975 and a stretch of U.S. Route 321 outside of Boone was named for him in 1986. Professorships were endowed in his honor at Appalachian State University and the University of North Carolina at Chapel Hill in 1997 and 2012, respectively. He was accorded the North Carolina Award—the state's highest civilian honor—for public service in 2006. His official desk is kept at the governor's office in the Department of Administration building. Historian Karl Campbell described his record as falling "well within the parameters of the moderate progressive Democratic governors who preceded him." Journalist Rob Christensen wrote, "Few people played a greater role in turning North Carolina into a two-party state than Holshouser". Reflecting on his time in office, Holshouser said in an interview that his service proved that "North Carolina could operate for four years with a Republican governor without the world coming to an end and without causing a major political crisis or anything like that." Hunt referred to him as one of North Carolina's "better angels".

== Works cited ==
- Bass, Jack (1995). The Transformation of Southern Politics: Social Change and Political Consequence Since 1945 (reprint ed.). University of Georgia Press. ISBN 9780820317281.
- Bernick, E. Lee; Wiggins, Charles W. (1984). "The Governor's Executive Order: An Unknown Power". State & Local Government Review. 16 (1): 3–10. JSTOR 4354799.
- Campbell, Karl E. (2017). "The Rise and Fall of the Progressive Plutocracy". New Voyages to Carolina: Reinterpreting North Carolina History. Chapel Hill: University of North Carolina Press. ISBN 9781469634609.
- Champagne, Anthony; Haydel, Judith (1993). Judicial Reform in the States. University Press of America. ISBN 9780819189233.
- Cheney, John L. Jr., ed. (1973). North Carolina Manual. Raleigh: North Carolina Secretary of State. OCLC 892811255.
- Christensen, Rob (2010). The Paradox of Tar Heel Politics: The Personalities, Elections, and Events That Shaped Modern North Carolina (second ed.). Chapel Hill: The University of North Carolina Press. ISBN 978-0-8078-7151-5.
- Christensen, Rob (2019). The Rise and Fall of the Branchhead Boys: North Carolina's Scott Family and the Era of Progressive Politics. Chapel Hill: The University of North Carolina Press. ISBN 9781469651057.
- Covington, Howard E.; Ellis, Marion A., eds. (2002). The North Carolina Century: Tar Heels who Made a Difference, 1900–2000. Levine Museum of the New South. ISBN 9780807827574.
- Dennis, Stephen N. (1975). "Recent changes in the appropriations process". Popular Government. Vol. 40, no. 4. Institute of Government. pp. 11–17.
- Eamon, Tom (2014). The Making of a Southern Democracy: North Carolina Politics from Kerr Scott to Pat McCrory. UNC Press Books. ISBN 9781469606972. - See profile at Google Books
- Fergus, Devin (2009). Liberalism, Black Power, and the Making of American Politics, 1965-1980. University of Georgia Press. ISBN 9780820333236.
- Fleer, Jack (2007). Governors Speak. University Press of America. ISBN 9780761835646.
- Fleer, Jack D. (1994). North Carolina Government & Politics. Lincoln: University of Nebraska Press. ISBN 9780803268852.
- Grimsley, Wayne (2003). James B. Hunt: A North Carolina Progressive. McFarland. ISBN 9780786416073.
- Haemmel, William G. (April 1979). "The Ombudsman, or Citizens' Defender - The North Carolina Experience" (PDF). North Carolina Central Law Review. 10 (2): 227–247.
- Healy, Thomas (2021). Soul City: Race, Equality, and the Lost Dream of an American Utopia. New York City: Metropolitan Books. ISBN 9781627798624.
- Hood, John (2015). Catalyst: Jim Martin and the Rise of North Carolina Republicans. Winston-Salem: John F. Blair, Publisher. ISBN 9780895876577.
- Landis, Alexander P. (1990). The Two-party South (second ed.). Oxford University Press. ISBN 9780195065794.
- Link, William A. (2008). Righteous Warrior: Jesse Helms and the Rise of Modern Conservatism. New York: Macmillan. ISBN 9780312356002.
- Lowery, Malinda Maynor (2018). The Lumbee Indians: An American Struggle. Chapel Hill: UNC Press Books. ISBN 978-1-4696-4638-1.
- Luebke, Paul (2000). Tar Heel Politics 2000 (revised ed.). The University of North Carolina Press. ISBN 9780807889329.

North Carolina House of Representatives
Preceded by Murray Harris Coffey	Member of the North Carolina House of Representatives from Watauga County; 1963–1967	Succeeded by District abolished
Preceded by Mack Stewart Isaac	Member of the North Carolina House of Representatives from the 44th district 1969–1973	Succeeded by Ernest Bryan Messer; Liston Bryan Ramsey
Party political offices
Preceded by Jim Gardner	Chairman of the North Carolina Republican Party; 1966–1972	Succeeded by Frank Rouse
Preceded by James Gardner	Republican nominee for Governor of North Carolina; 1972	Succeeded by David Flaherty
Political offices
Preceded by Robert Scott	Governor of North Carolina; January 5, 1973 – January 8, 1977	Succeeded by Jim Hunt
