= James G. Martin =

70th governor of North Carolina

James Martin
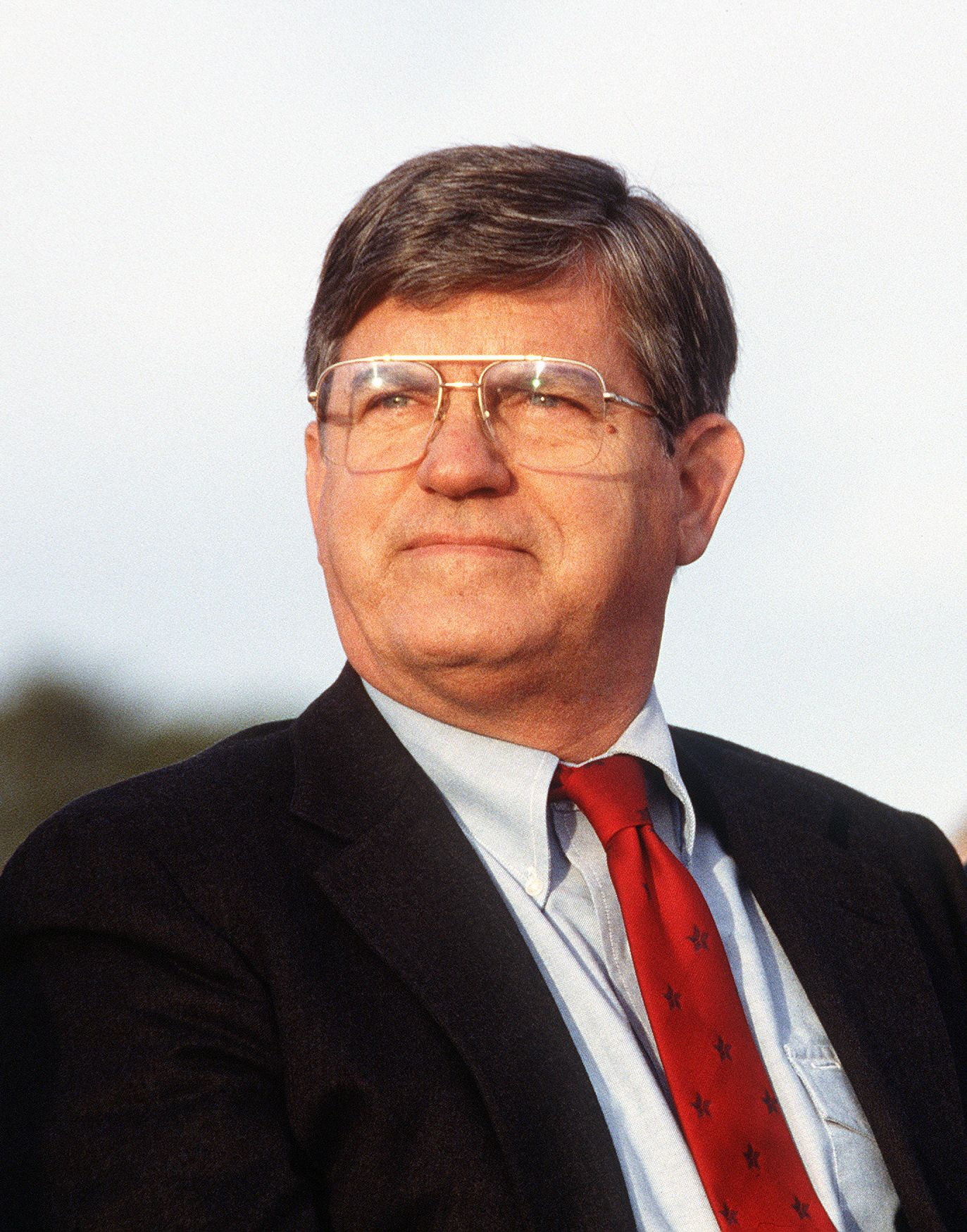
- Martin at Johnson AFB, December 1988

70th Governor of North Carolina
- In office January 5, 1985 – January 9, 1993
- Lieutenant: Robert Jordan; Jim Gardner
- Preceded by: Jim Hunt
- Succeeded by: Jim Hunt

Chair of the House Republican Research Committee
- In office January 3, 1983 – January 3, 1985
- Leader: Bob Michel
- Preceded by: Ed Madigan
- Succeeded by: Jerry Lewis

Member of the U.S. House of Representatives from North Carolina's 9th district
- In office January 3, 1973 – January 3, 1985
- Preceded by: Charles R. Jonas
- Succeeded by: Alex McMillan

Personal details
- Born: James Grubbs Martin; December 11, 1935 (age 90) Savannah, Georgia, U.S.
- Party: Republican
- Spouse: Dorothy McAulay (m. 1957; died 2026)
- Children: 3
- Education: Davidson College (BS); Princeton University (MS, PhD)

James Grubbs Martin (born December 11, 1935) is an American chemist and politician who served as the 70th governor of North Carolina from 1985 to 1993. A member of the Republican Party, he previously served six terms as the U.S. representative for North Carolina's 9th congressional district from 1973 to 1985.

Martin was the third Republican elected governor of North Carolina after Reconstruction, the second since the 1900 North Carolina gubernatorial election, and the fifth overall. As of 2026, he was also the only Republican to serve two full terms as governor of the state. Since the passing of James Holshouser in 2013, Martin is North Carolina's oldest surviving governor. Since Jim Hunt's death in 2025, Martin is also the last surviving governor to have served in the 20th century.

== Early life and education ==
James Grubbs Martin was born on December 11, 1935, in Savannah, and subsequently raised in South Carolina. He graduated from Davidson College in 1957 with a Bachelor of Science degree. Shortly after graduation, on June 1, he married Dorothy Ann McAulay of Charlotte, North Carolina. An avid tuba player, he was a member of Phi Mu Alpha Sinfonia music fraternity and Beta Theta Pi Social Fraternity while an undergraduate at Davidson.

== Academic career ==
Martin received his PhD in chemistry from Princeton University in 1960, after completing a doctoral dissertation titled "Stereochemistry of the Diels-Alder reaction." He then served as an associate professor of chemistry at his alma mater Davidson College until 1972. As a professor at Davidson, he advised the school's Young Republicans chapter.

== Political career ==
Martin registered as a member of the Republican Party in 1961 or 1962. He later explained, "I joined with the minority party because I felt the south needed two-party competition." In 1966, he was elected to the Mecklenburg County Board of Commissioners. He served for seven years, chairing the body from 1967 to 1968, and briefly in 1971. He was a president of the North Carolina Association of County Commissioners.

=== House of Representatives (1973–1985) ===
He was elected to the United States House of Representatives in 1972 representing the Charlotte-based 9th Congressional district. He served there for six terms. He served as a Ways and Means Committee member, and as a House Republican Research Committee chairman. He became the first elected official to receive the Charles Lathrop Parsons Award, given by the American Chemical Society for outstanding public service by an American chemist, in 1983.

In 1984, with incumbent governor Jim Hunt leaving office due to the term limit, Martin ran for the Republican nomination and won. He defeated state attorney general Rufus Edmisten by a nine-point margin. He was helped by the coattails from Ronald Reagan's landslide re-election victory. He was also helped when Lieutenant Governor Jimmy Green endorsed him after being defeated by Edmisten in the Democratic primary. Green was from eastern North Carolina, and his endorsement helped Martin win support among conservative Democrats in that part of the state.

=== Governor of North Carolina (1985–1993) ===
While most political figures running for office were prone to make promises covering a wide range of issues from education to health care, Martin made one promise that garnered a lot of attention; he said he would address all of the priorities in the state, but his only promise was that construction on Interstate 40 from Raleigh to Wilmington, North Carolina would be finished before he left office. The long-neglected and last leg of I-40 from Barstow, California would open up the southeastern coastal area to the rest of the state. He was true to his promise; the last unfinished leg of I-40 was finished before the end of his first term.

Martin was easily reelected in 1988, defeating Lieutenant Governor Bob Jordan by 13 points. In so doing, he became the only member of his party to have been elected to two terms as governor of North Carolina. He was part of a 28-year trend of Governors of North Carolina who were named James, having been preceded and succeeded by Jim Hunt, who in turn was preceded in his first term by James Holshouser.

== Later life ==
In 1993, Martin retired from political life and became chairman of the board of the James Cannon Research Center of Carolinas Medical Center in Charlotte, North Carolina. In 2012, he was appointed to lead an investigation into academic improprieties at the University of North Carolina at Chapel Hill. For the United States presidential election in 2016, Martin endorsed fellow Republican John Kasich.

== Works ==
- Revelation through Science (2016)

== Legacy ==
In January 2017, the Pope Center for Higher Education Policy changed its name to the James G. Martin Center for Academic Renewal, named after Governor Martin. Gov. Martin also serves on the board of directors for the Martin Center. The Eastern Half of the Charlotte Outerbelt is named the James G. Martin Freeway.

== Gallery ==
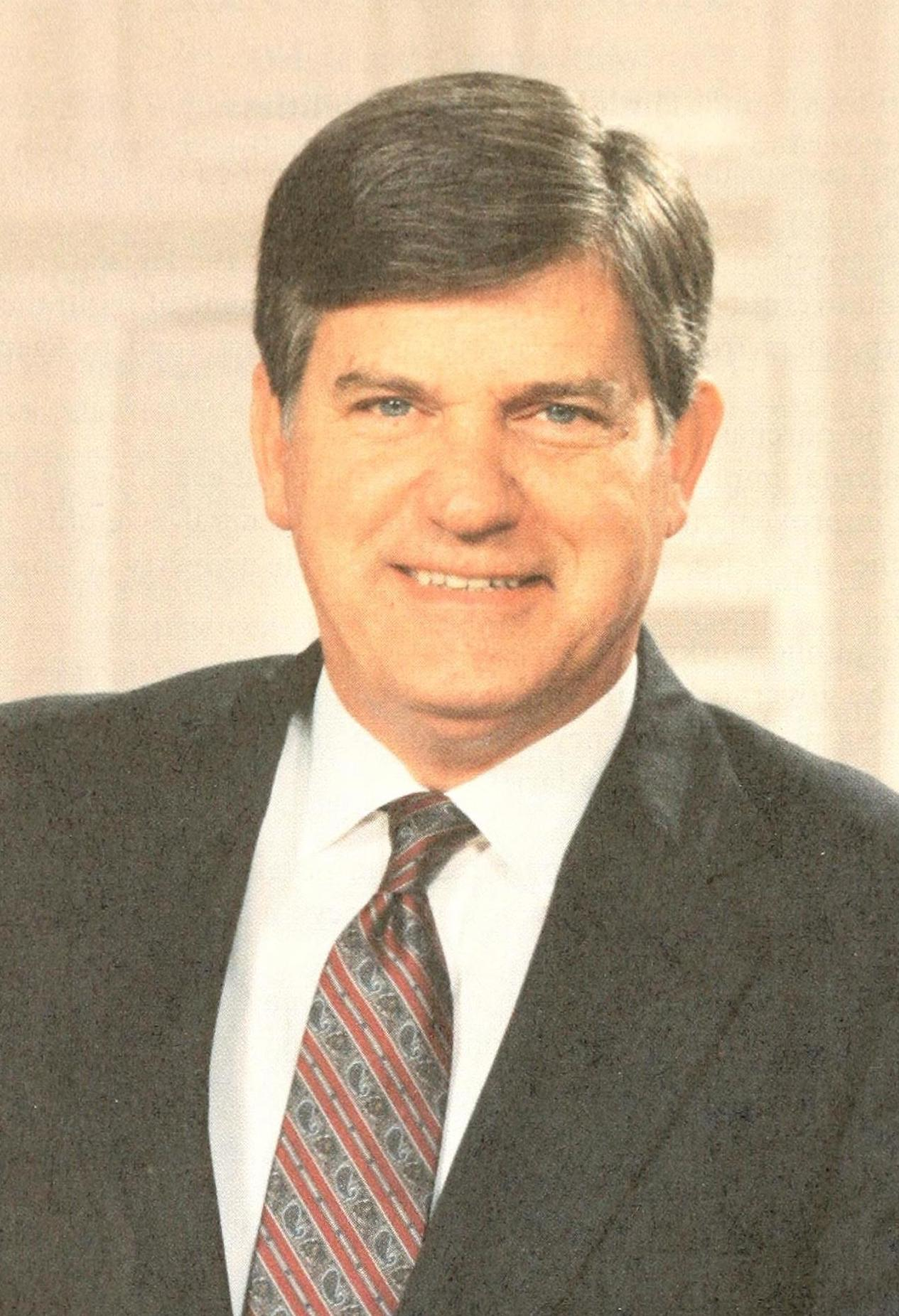
1987. First term portrait

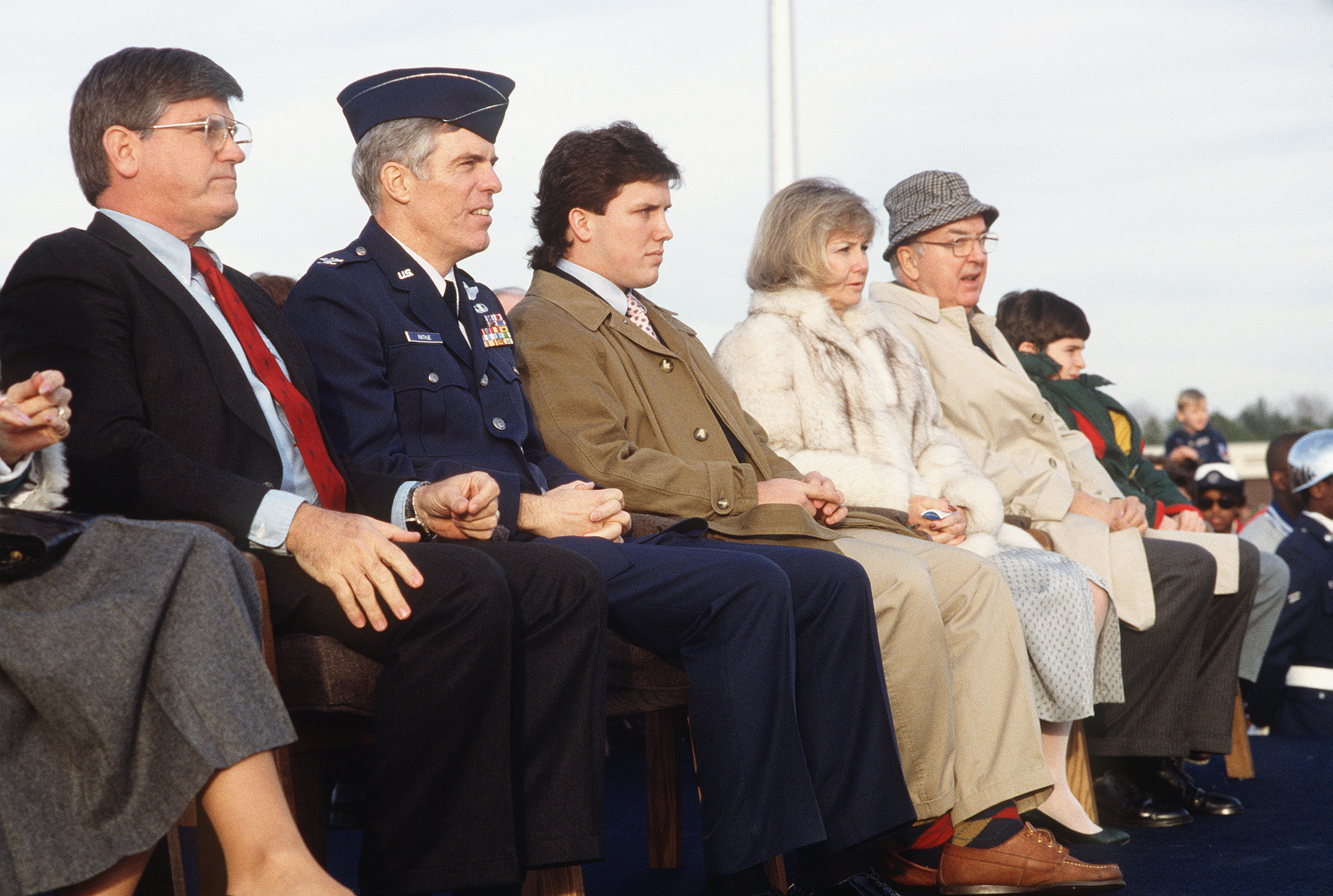
1988. Martin at Johnson AFB with U.S. Senator Jesse Helms (right)

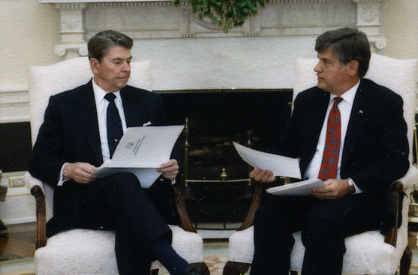
1988. Martin and U.S. President Ronald Reagan

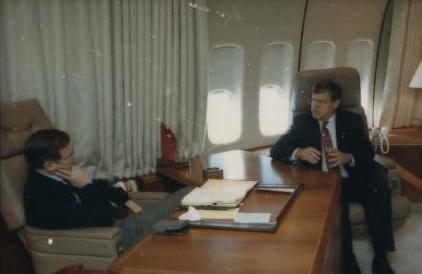
1991. Martin and U.S. President George H. W. Bush

== Works cited ==
- Fleer, Jack (2007). Governors Speak. University Press of America. ISBN 9780761835646.

U.S. House of Representatives
Preceded by Charles R. Jonas	Member of the U.S. House of Representatives from North Carolina's 9th congressional district 1973–1985	Succeeded by Alex McMillan
Party political offices
Preceded by Ed Madigan	Chair of the House Republican Research Committee; 1983–1985	Succeeded by Jerry Lewis
Preceded by Beverly Lake	Republican nominee for Governor of North Carolina; 1984, 1988	Succeeded by Jim Gardner
Political offices
Preceded by Jim Hunt	Governor of North Carolina; 1985–1993	Succeeded by Jim Hunt
U.S. order of precedence (ceremonial)
Preceded by Martha McSally as Former U.S. Senator	Order of precedence of the United States; Within North Carolina	Succeeded by Mike Easley as Former Governor
Preceded by David Paterson as Former Governor	Order of precedence of the United States; Outside North Carolina	Succeeded by Mike Easley as Former Governor
