= Robert L. Gavin =

American lawyer and politician (1916–1981)

Robert Lee Gavin
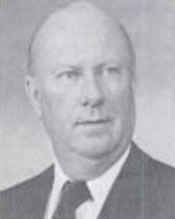

United States Attorney for the Middle District of North Carolina
- In office 1957–1958
- President: Dwight D. Eisenhower
- Preceded by: Edwin Monroe Stanley
- Succeeded by: James E. Holshouser, Sr.

Chairman of the North Carolina Republican Party
- In office August 18, 1962 – June 6, 1963
- Preceded by: William E. Cobb
- Succeeded by: J. Herman Saxon

Personal details
- Born: May 22, 1916 Roseboro, North Carolina, U.S.
- Died: June 11, 1981 (aged 65) Pinehurst, North Carolina, U.S.
- Party: Republican
- Spouse: Grace McNiell Blue (m. 1947)
- Children: 3
- Education: University of North Carolina

Robert Lee Gavin (May 22, 1916 – June 11, 1981) was an American attorney and politician from North Carolina.

== Early life and education ==
Robert Gavin was born on May 22, 1916, in Roseboro, North Carolina, to Edward Lee Gavin and Mary Caudle Gavin. Soon thereafter his family moved to Sanford, where he attended public schools. He received a bachelor's degree from the University of North Carolina at Chapel Hill in 1936 and returned to Sanford to establish a timber business. After the outbreak of World War II, Gavin left Sanford to serve in the United States Army Coast Artillery Corps for one year, reaching the rank of corporal. After the war Gavin finished his education at the University of North Carolina School of Law and was admitted to the North Carolina State Bar in 1946. He married Grace McNiell Blue in 1947 and had three children with her.

== Career ==
After receiving his law degree, Gavin returned to Sanford and practiced with the family firm of Gavin, Jackson, and Gavin. He served as a delegate to the Republican Party's national conventions in 1948, 1960, and 1964. In 1954 he was appointed Assistant United States District Attorney for the Middle District of North Carolina. In 1957 he was made United States District Attorney for the Middle District, temporarily filling in a vacancy created by the departure of his predecessor. In 1958 he left the post to resume private legal practice.

In 1960, Gavin, a Republican, ran to become Governor of North Carolina. He faced Democrat Terry Sanford in the general election. Gavin denounced Sanford as a tool of the liberal leadership of the national Democratic Party and organized labor. He identified himself as a conservative but denied being a reactionary. He called for a "fusion" of Democratic and Republican voters to support his candidacy, and promised to institute a civil service system to reduce the amount of patronage available to state politicians. Though he said he would not make race an issue of his campaign, he criticized the national Democratic Party's support for civil rights. He lost the gubernatorial race, 613,975 votes to Sanford's 735,258 votes, but performed better than other Republican gubernatorial candidates had in preceding years. On August 18, 1962, he was elected Chairman of the North Carolina Republican Party, holding the post until he resigned on June 6, 1963. Gavin initially announced that he would not seek the Republican nomination for the 1964 North Carolina gubernatorial election, but changed his mind at the state Republican convention and accepted the nomination that year after being urged to do so by his colleagues. He lost the general election to Democrat Dan K. Moore, earning 606,165 votes to Moore's 790,343 votes. Attributing the defeat to a lack of black electoral support, he urged the Republican Party to reach out to black voters, though he opposed the Civil Rights Act of 1964.

Gavin served as the city attorney of Sanford from 1965 to 1971, when he left the city and moved to Pinehurst. He served on the North Carolina State Constitution Study Commission in 1968. In 1972 and 1973 he acted as a civilian aide to the Secretary of the Army. Republican governor James Holshouser appointed him as a special judge on the North Carolina Superior Court in 1974. He was sworn in on January 6, 1975. Holshouser's successor, Democrat Jim Hunt, reappointed Gavin to the post, and in 1980 he supported Hunt's reelection. He retired from the judgeship that year.

== Later life ==
After leaving his judicial office, Gavin practiced law at the firm of Staton, Gavin, and Perkinson. He began receiving chemotherapy to treat liver cancer in early 1981. He died on June 11, 1981, at his home in Pinehurst.

== Works cited ==
- 19th National Conference of Civilian Aides to the Secretary of the Army: A New Era, A New Army. Washington D.C.: Department of the Army. 1973.
- Bicentennial Celebration of the United States Attorneys (PDF), United States Department of Justice, 1989
- Drescher, John (2000). Triumph of Good Will: How Terry Sanford Beat a Champion of Segregation in and Reshaped the South. Jackson, MS: University Press of Mississippi. ISBN 1-57806-310-8. - Read online
- Eamon, Tom (2014). The Making of a Southern Democracy: North Carolina Politics from Kerr Scott to Pat McCrory. UNC Press Books. ISBN 9781469606972. - See profile at Google Books
- North Carolina Manual. Raleigh: North Carolina Secretary of State. 1965.

Party political offices
Preceded by Kyle Hayes	Republican nominee for Governor of North Carolina; 1960, 1964	Succeeded by Jim Gardner
