= I. Beverly Lake Sr. =

American judge

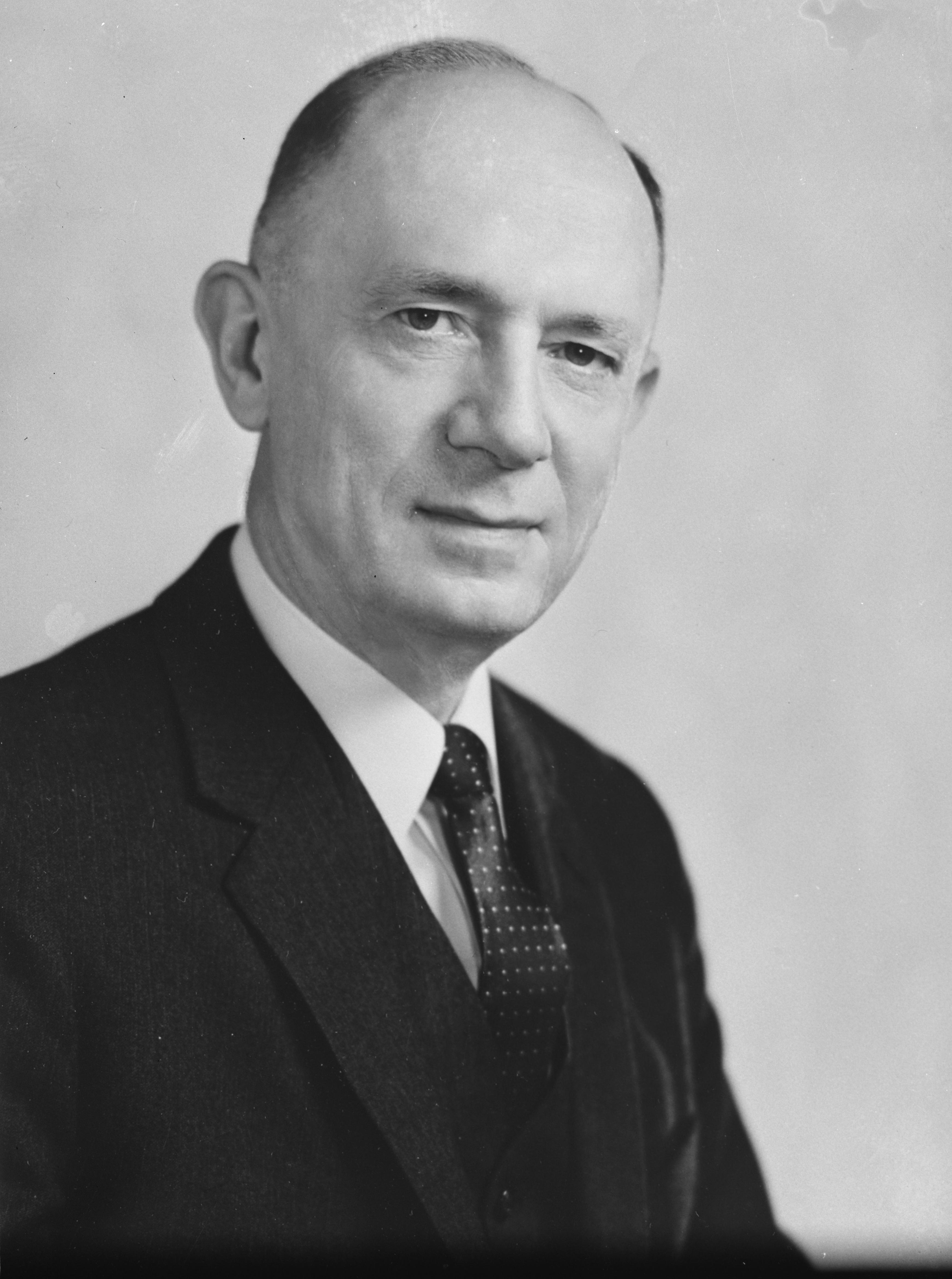
- Lake in 1965

Associate Justice of the North Carolina Supreme Court
- In office 1965 – 1978
- Appointed by: Dan K. Moore
- Preceded by: William B. Rodman Jr.
- Succeeded by: David M. Britt

Personal details
- Born: Isaac Beverly Lake; August 29, 1906 Wake Forest, North Carolina, U.S.
- Died: April 11, 1996 (aged 89) Raleigh, North Carolina, U.S.
- Party: Democratic
- Children: I. Beverly Lake Jr.
- Education: Wake Forest College (B.S., 1925); Harvard Law School (LL.B, 1929); Columbia University Law School (LL.M, 1940; S.J.D, 1947)
- Occupation: Attorney, professor, jurist

Isaac Beverly Lake Sr. (August 29, 1906 – April 11, 1996) was an American jurist, law professor at Wake Forest University and Campbell University, and politician. A supporter of racial segregation, he was unsuccessful in two efforts to become the Democratic candidate for the office of Governor of North Carolina in the 1960s. He served as an associate justice of the North Carolina Supreme Court from 1965 to 1978.

== Early career ==
Lake was graduate of Wake Forest College, Harvard Law School, and Columbia University Law School; he earned a Doctor of Juridical Science degree from the latter institution. Lake joined the staff of North Carolina Attorney General Harry McMullan in 1950. There, he drew upon his knowledge of public utility law to handle rate cases before the state Utilities Commission, which earned him a reputation as a consumer advocate.

When the Supreme Court of the United States invited North Carolina to appear as amicus curiae in the landmark Brown v. Board of Education case in 1954, Lake argued against it, telling the governor that it was a "diabolical scheme" designed to subject the state directly to whatever orders the Court issued as a consequence of the decision. The governor nevertheless decided to file an amicus brief, and Lake presented the state's case in defense of racial segregation before the Supreme Court during hearings over Brown II in 1955, when the Court considered arguments by schools requesting relief concerning the task of desegregation.

== 1960 campaign for governor ==
After the Supreme Court handed down its decision insisting on the dismantling of the state's segregated school system, Lake attacked the National Association for the Advancement of Colored People (NAACP) in a speech in Asheboro, accusing it of agitating the state's African-American population. Lake's speech established him as a leader of the state's segregationists, some of whom suggested that he should run for governor. Now in private practice, Lake remained coy but continued to assist segregationist efforts, attacking the sitting governor, Luther Hodges, for caving in to national pressure to adopt a moderate course and preparing a bill for the North Carolina General Assembly that would have amended the state's constitution to remove the requirement for a system of publicly funded schools.

Yet, as the 1960 North Carolina gubernatorial election approached, Lake initially announced that he would not be a candidate for governor due to a lack of funds. The entry of the state's moderate attorney-general, Malcolm Seawell, into the race, along with the start of the lunch-counter demonstrations in Greensboro caused Lake to change his mind, and he announced his candidacy for the office. In one advertisement, he wrote "The mixing of our two great races in the classroom and then in the home is not inevitable and is not to be tolerated." Lake made segregation the dominant issue of his campaign, attacking Hodges's management of integration and the NAACP. With Robert Burren Morgan acting as his campaign manager, Lake did well enough to place second in the Democratic primary to Terry Sanford, but in the subsequent runoff election, Sanford defeated Lake by a margin of 50,000 votes.

== Subsequent career ==
In the 1964 North Carolina gubernatorial election, Lake ran again, but was eliminated in the first primary. After conceding the race, he threw his support to Judge Dan Moore, which was crucial to Moore's victory in the runoff. In return for his support, Moore named Lake to the next opening on the North Carolina Supreme Court. Lake was sworn in as an associate justice on August 30, 1965. He served until 1978.

Lake was married twice—his first wife, Gertrude M. Bell, died in 1975; he was survived by his second wife, Kathleen Robinson Mackie Lake. His son, I. Beverly Lake Jr., followed him into politics and law.

== Sources ==
- Presentation of the Portrait of I. Beverly Lake Sr.
- Triumph of Good Will: How Terry Sanford Beat a Champion of Segregation and Reshaped the South By John Drescher. See book at Google Books
- Oral History Interview with I. Beverly Lake Sr. at Oral Histories of the American South
- OurCampaigns.com
