= Francisco Mayorga =

Nicaraguan economist and writer (born 1949)

Francisco Mayorga (born April 10, 1949, in León, Nicaragua) is a Nicaraguan economist and writer who specializes in international finance, economic development and artificial intelligence. Mayorga holds a doctorate (1986) and two master's degrees (1985, 1972) from Yale University.

For twenty years he taught managerial economics and corporate finance at INCAE, the leading Latin American graduate business school.

During the 1980s he served for five years in the board of directors of the Central American Bank for Integration (CABEI), the largest financial institution of the region. Also during the 1980s, Mayorga worked for the cause of peace in Central America, acting as executive secretary of the International Commission for Central American Recovery and Development (the Sanford Commission). Under the presidency of Violeta Chamorro he served as president of the Central Bank of Nicaragua in 1990, where he launched the monetary reform based on the Cordoba Oro that brought to an end the highest hyperinflation in Latin America.

In 1995 he founded Banco del Café de Nicaragua, serving as its president and CEO until the year 2000, when in the midst of a banking crisis it collapsed along with half of the Nicaraguan financial institutions.

An active Christian Democrat and opponent to the government of Arnoldo Alemán, Mayorga was prosecuted on the basis of charges which proved to be false. Mayorga was never convicted but spent two and a half years in jail as a political prisoner. He faced trial twice, assuming his own defense. Mayorga succeeded in winning his acquittal by two successive juries in 2001 and 2003. The Human Rights Commissioner of Nicaragua declared twice the violation of Mayorga's rights: one for retardation of justice and one for double jeopardy.

== Professional and academic trajectory ==
For twenty years he taught managerial economics and corporate finance at INCAE, the leading Latin American graduate business school.

In 2003 he returned to academic life as dean of the Albertus Magnus International Institute, a small private Central American organization devoted to higher learning and research in economics, finance and international business.

In 2009–2010 Mayorga was the Central American spokesman in the negotiation of the financial instrument of the Association Agreement with the European Union.

He worked at Albertus for eight years, resigning in June 2011 to serve in the board of directors of the Inter American Development Bank (IDB) in Washington. For 10 years he served as the executive director on behalf of the Central American countries in the IDB and IDBInvest boards.

Upon completing his term at the IDB Group, he agreed to serve as rector of the Universidad Privada Boliviana, (UPB) for a period of three years, to launch a transformation process to raise its standards towards a world-class university. He was also elected president of the Midwest Latin American Studies Association (MALAS) of the United States for the period 2022. During that period, he successfully faced the emergence of generative artificial intelligence, leading the adaptation of teaching activity to new technology. Mayorga concluded his rectorship in September 2024.

In 2023, he took the lead in the creation of the Latin American Artificial Intelligence Network (RIAL), which in one year managed to bring together more than two hundred specialists from a hundred universities in sixteen Latin American countries, serving as its president until November 2024.

From November 2024 to July 2025 he represented Central America as a senior advisor on the World Bank board of directors.

== Literary work ==
Mayorga started a literary career writing two novels in prison: La Puerta de los Mares (2001) and El Hijo de la Estrella (2003), both published in Managua by LEA Grupo Editorial. In subsequent years he occasionally published short stories and poems, returning to the novel in May 2014 with El Filatelista (Ediciones Albertus, Managua). In 2016 he published his fourth novel, Cinco estrellas (Ediciones Albertus, Managua), dealing with the ascension to power of dictator Anastasio Somoza Garcia. In 2022 he published his fifth novel, Memorias de Somoza (Editorial Nuevo Milenio, Bolivia), which narrates the visit of dictator Anastasio Somoza García and his wife Salvadora to the United States, special guests of the president. His most recent novel, El póker de los coroneles (Editorial Nuevo Milenio, Bolivia), was published in 2023, completing the trilogy on the government of the Somoza family in Nicaragua and its overthrow.

== Economic writings ==
In 2007 he published Megacapitales de Nicaragua (Managua: Ediciones Albertus), a study of the major economic groups in Nicaragua, their business strategies and their implications for economic development. His latest book, Nicaragua 2010: El Futuro de la Economía (Ediciones Albertus, 2008), is an analysis of the changing economic structure of Nicaragua as a consequence of the increased demand for biofuels and its impact on agricultural prices. Both books continue to exercise considerable influence in the debate about the Nicaraguan economy. ´

In recent years he has focused his research interests on artificial intelligence, publishing Las fronteras del conocimiento: el ímpetu de la inteligencia artificial (Amazon, August 2025); La inteligencia artificial y el futuro de los negocios (Amazon, February 2026); Latinoamérica en la encrucijada: los desafíos de la inteligencia artificial (Amazon, August 2026); and La empresa inteligente: integrando la IA a las finanzas, las operaciones y la toma de decisiones (Amazon, November 2026).

In November 2026 Mayorga published the essay El futuro de nuestros nietos: revisitando a Keynes en la era de la inteligencia artificial (Amazon).
