= David M. Britt =

American judge

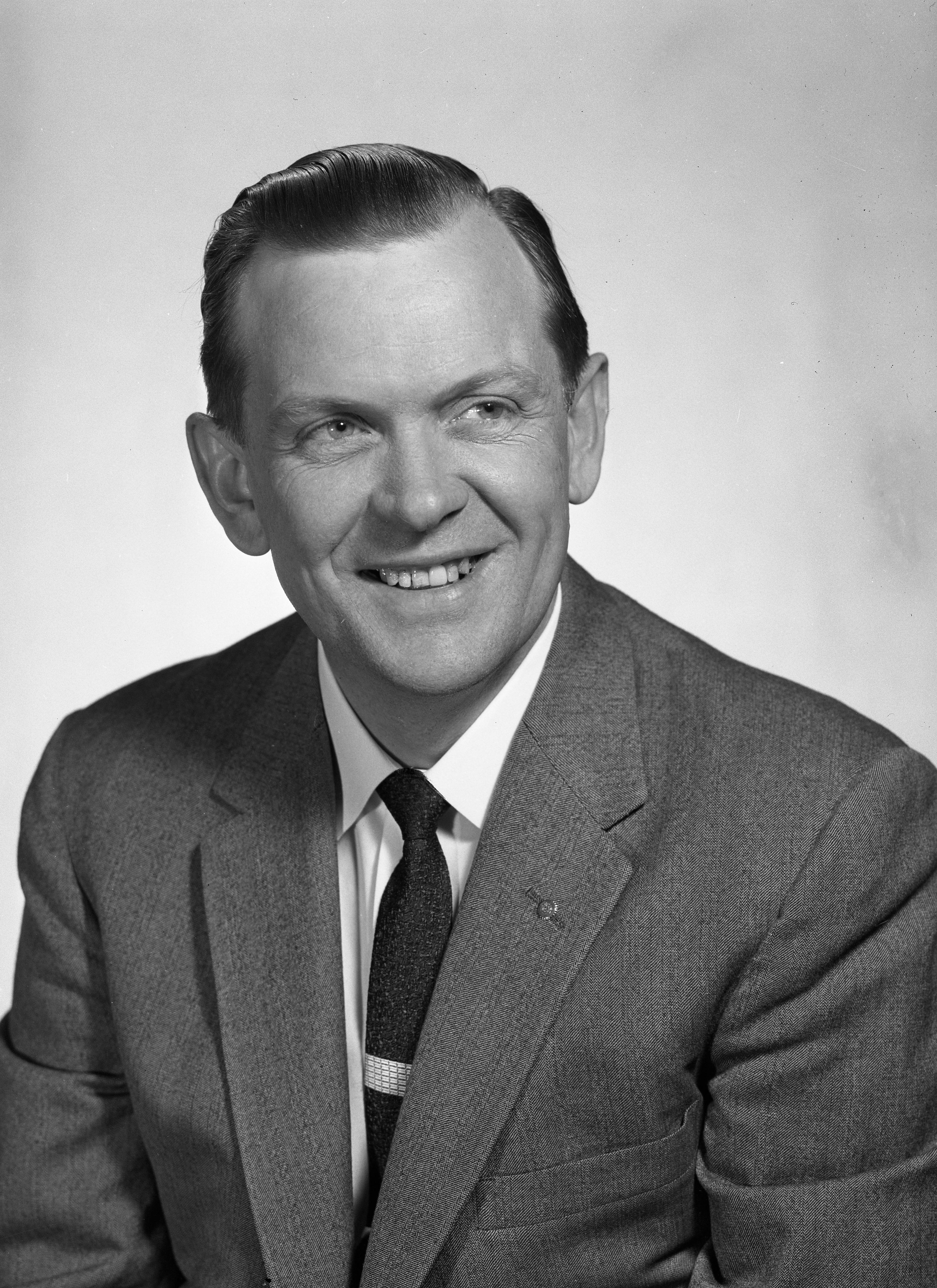
Britt circa 1959

David Maxwell Britt (January 3, 1917 – May 5, 2009) was a North Carolina politician and jurist who served as Speaker of the North Carolina House of Representatives, as one of the original judges of the North Carolina Court of Appeals, and finally as a justice of the North Carolina Supreme Court. He retired from the bench in 1982.

Born in McDonald, North Carolina, he was the brother of federal judge W. Earl Britt. Britt studied law at Wake Forest University and then passed the bar exam, even though he left law school a few classes short of graduation.

Britt represented Robeson County in the North Carolina House of Representatives from 1958 until 1967, when Gov. Dan K. Moore appointed him to the new Court of Appeals. As a legislator, Britt helped reform the state's judicial system, including creating the state Court of Appeals and state District Courts.

Britt was elected to the state Supreme Court in 1978, succeeding I. Beverly Lake Sr., and served through 1982. He then joined the Raleigh law firm of Bailey & Dixon.

He died in May 2009 predeceased by his wife and survived by three children and grandchildren.
