= Terry Sanford =

American lawyer and politician (1917–1998)

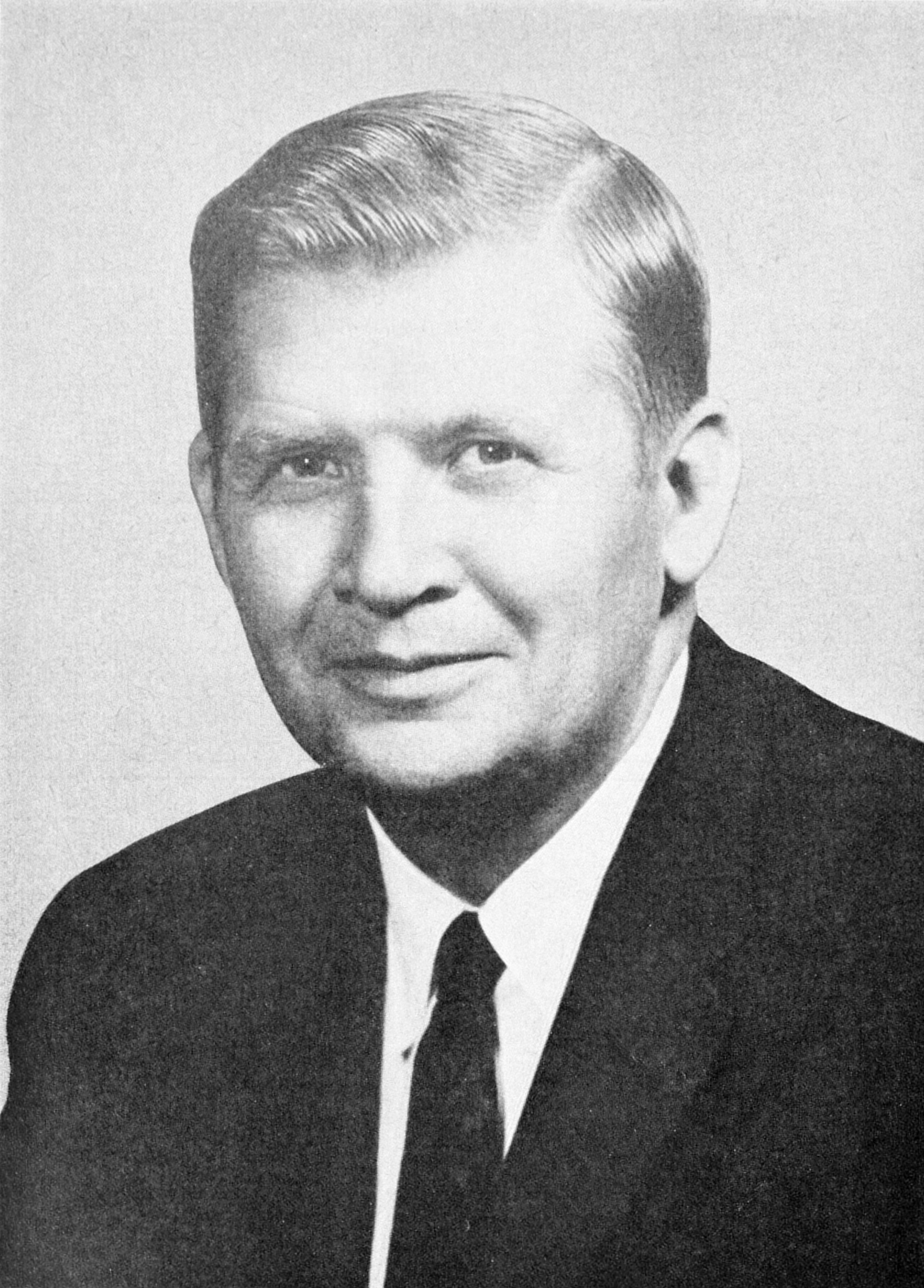
- Sanford in 1961

United States Senator from North Carolina
- In office November 5, 1986 – January 3, 1993
- Preceded by: Jim Broyhill
- Succeeded by: Lauch Faircloth

6th President of Duke University
- In office April 2, 1970 – July 4, 1985
- Preceded by: Douglas Knight
- Succeeded by: H. Keith H. Brodie

65th Governor of North Carolina
- In office January 5, 1961 – January 8, 1965
- Lieutenant: Harvey Cloyd Philpott
- Preceded by: Luther H. Hodges
- Succeeded by: Dan K. Moore

Member of the North Carolina Senate from the 10th district
- In office January 7, 1953 – January 1955 Serving with James Bridger
- Preceded by: Bunn Frink; Junius Powell
- Succeeded by: Ray Walton; Arthur Williamson

Personal details
- Born: James Terry Sanford; August 20, 1917 Laurinburg, North Carolina, U.S.
- Died: April 18, 1998 (aged 80) Durham, North Carolina, U.S.
- Resting place: Duke Chapel
- Party: Democratic
- Spouse: Margaret Knight (m. 1942)
- Children: 2
- Education: University of North Carolina, Chapel Hill (AB, LLB)

Military service
- Allegiance: United States
- Branch/service: United States Army
- Years of service: 1942–1945; 1948–1960
- Rank: First Lieutenant
- Unit: 517th Parachute Infantry Regiment; North Carolina Army National Guard
- Battles/wars: World War II; Operation Dragoon; Battle of the Bulge
- Awards: Purple Heart; Bronze Star
- Terry Sanford's voice Sanford speaks on the importance of political parties in the United States; Recorded May 13, 1992

James Terry Sanford (August 20, 1917 – April 18, 1998) was an American lawyer and politician from North Carolina. A member of the Democratic Party, Sanford served as the 65th governor of North Carolina from 1961 to 1965, was a two-time U.S. presidential candidate in the 1970s, and served as a U.S. senator from 1986 to 1993. He was a strong proponent of public education and introduced several reforms and new programs in North Carolina's schools and institutions of higher education as the state's governor. From 1970 to 1985, Sanford served as the president of Duke University.

Born in Laurinburg, North Carolina, Sanford became a Federal Bureau of Investigation special agent after graduating from the University of North Carolina at Chapel Hill in 1939. During World War II he joined the United States Army and saw combat in the European Theater. Following the war, Sanford attended and graduated from the University of North Carolina School of Law and began a legal career in the late 1940s, soon becoming involved in politics. He served one term in the North Carolina Senate and managed W. Kerr Scott's U.S. Senate campaign in 1954 before running for governor in 1960. Focusing on improving education and economic opportunity, he defeated segregationist I. Beverly Lake Sr. in the Democratic primary and was subsequently elected governor in the general election. Taking office in 1961, he pushed a controversial tax increase through the state legislature to double public spending on schools and created a commission to study further education. Growing increasingly anxious about opportunities for black students, he became the first Southern governor to call for an end to racially discriminatory employment practices in 1963 and used law enforcement to protect civil rights demonstrators. He also created the North Carolina Fund to alleviate poverty and lobbied for a major environmental research facility to be located at the Research Triangle Park, while also presiding over reforms in other areas such as medical assistance and health and safety during his time as governor.

Leaving the governorship in 1965, Sanford remained active in Democratic Party politics and engaged in the practice of law before being hired as President of Duke University in 1970. While there, he increased the school's fundraising, managed student protests, and created new institutions to study public policy issues. Retiring in 1985, he successfully ran for a U.S. Senate seat the following year. In Congress he maintained a liberal voting record, cofounding the International Commission for Central American Recovery and Development, objecting to the passage of a Flag Desecration Amendment, and criticizing American involvement in the Gulf War. Defeated in a bid for re-election in 1992, he spent his later years practicing law, writing, and teaching at Duke before he died of cancer in 1998. He is remembered in North Carolina as the "education governor" and served as a role model for several other Southern governors.

== Early life ==
=== Youth ===
James Terry Sanford was born on August 20, 1917, in Laurinburg, North Carolina, United States. He was the second of five children of Elizabeth Terry (née Martin) and Cecil Leroy Sanford. His father ran a hardware store while his mother worked as a teacher. The Sanfords enjoyed a middle class standard of living. During the Great Depression, Cecil's hardware store was forced to close and the family was unable to pay rent, but the company which owned their house allowed them to stay. Cecil struggled to find steady work and performed temporary jobs while Elizabeth returned to full-time teaching. Despite the family's economic troubles, the Sanfords never went hungry and Terry later reflected that he never thought of his family as poor. He and his brother worked odd jobs to make money in their youth, including raising chickens and pigs, selling vegetables, picking cotton, planting tobacco, and delivering newspapers.

=== Education ===
By November 1933 Sanford's father had found a new permanent job and purchased a house, and the following year Sanford graduated from high school. In the fall of 1934 Sanford enrolled at Presbyterian Junior College in Maxton. He worked part-time to pay for his tuition and lived at his parents' home while he studied there, but he found the instruction lacking and dropped out after one semester. In the fall of 1935 he enrolled at the University of North Carolina at Chapel Hill. He worked various jobs to pay for his tuition and during his senior year he settled on majoring in political science. After graduating in 1939 Sanford decided to enroll in law school.

While studying at the University of North Carolina School of Law, Sanford befriended Professor Albert Coates. He also took an increased interest in student politics, and won a seat in the newly created student legislative council. In that position he chaired the body's ways and means committee until he was elected its speaker. Early in 1941 he found work at UNC-Chapel Hill's Institute of Government, which was managed by Coates. In 1940, as World War II intensified and the likelihood of American involvement increased, the United States enacted a draft, and many students voluntarily joined the Armed Forces. Sanford attempted to get a commission in the Army Air Corps. Although he had earned his pilot's license, the corps determined he was nearsighted and thus unfit to fly. He then unsuccessfully applied to join the Marine Corps and the Navy.

=== FBI and military service ===
With Coates' help, Sanford applied to join the Federal Bureau of Investigation (FBI), which waived its requirement of a law degree and admitted him. After completing his semester exams, he began training in December 1941. He was posted as a special agent in Columbus, Ohio, and St. Louis. He married Margaret Rose Knight, a woman he had met at UNC-Chapel Hill, on July 4, 1942, and they later had two children: Terry Jr. and Elizabeth. Sanford pursued a position in the Armed Forces—as the United States had since entered the World War II—being especially intrigued by the new paratrooper units. After securing leave from the FBI, he enlisted in the Army on December 7, 1942. He was sent to Camp Toccoa in Georgia for training and was assigned to a medical detachment in the 501st Infantry Regiment. After eight weeks he was made a staff sergeant, and following jump training at Fort Benning he was sent to Camp Mackall and made assistant first sergeant. After a month he was promoted to first sergeant. He underwent officer training in 1943, and became a second lieutenant, and was made a platoon commander in A Company, First Battalion of the 517th Parachute Infantry Regiment.

Sanford's unit was shipped to Italy in May 1944. He first fought in combat against German forces in June in the mountains north of Rome. In August he parachuted into southern France as the leader of B Company, First Battalion in Operation Dragoon. By December he had achieved the rank of first lieutenant. That month the German army launched a counteroffensive through the Ardennes region in Belgium, initiating the Battle of the Bulge. Sanford and his unit were quickly deployed to the village of Soy. While his company was holding a ridge line near the Soy-Hotton road, fighting broke out and Sanford captured a German major who had run through the American lines, restraining him by grabbing his belt. In early January 1945 he received a shrapnel wound to his hand while walking through a German machine gun ambush near the town of Bergeval. In late February, the 517th Regiment was recalled to Joigny in preparation for a new airborne operation, but it and subsequent assaults were dropped as Allied ground forces made steady advances over German-held territory. For his service in France and his wounds Sanford was awarded the Bronze Star and Purple Heart.

=== Early legal career and Institute of Government ===
As the European theatre wound down in April 1945, preparations were made to deploy the 517th Regiment in the Pacific War. Japan surrendered before it was done, and Sanford was released from duty. He re-enrolled at UNC Law School for the fall 1945 semester to finish his courses and earn his degree. He graduated in 1946, and took the bar examination; he was admitted to the North Carolina State Bar in November. That fall he also was hired by Coates to serve as an assistant director of the Institute of Government and held the job until 1948. He then decided to pursue a career as a lawyer, and wanted to establish himself as a leading figure in a community so as to pave the way for a bid to become Governor of North Carolina. (Note: It is unclear when Sanford decided that he would like to be governor. He rejected the notion that he settled on it while he was an undergraduate student at UNC, though he said he thought about the office as a teenager. Biographers Howard E. Covington Jr. and Marion Ellis wrote, "There is little doubt that plans for a political career of some sort accompanied him to Chapel Hill in the fall of 1945 as he enrolled for classes to finish law school.") He decided to move to Fayetteville, which he thought was appropriately sized as a small city and not too far away from Laurinburg. After moving there in 1948 he worked in Charlie Rose Jr.'s law firm, before setting up his own practice with L. Stacy Weaver. Sanford served as a company commander with the rank of captain in Company K of 119th Infantry Regiment of the North Carolina Army National Guard from 1948 to 1960.

== Early political career ==
=== Young Democratic Clubs and Graham campaign ===
In the runoff 1948 Democratic gubernatorial primary, Sanford supported W. Kerr Scott, and after Scott was elected governor he appointed Sanford to a position in the North Carolina State Ports Authority. In 1949 Sanford was elected president of the North Carolina Young Democratic Clubs (YDC).

In March 1949 Scott surprised many Democrats when he appointed liberal UNC President Frank Porter Graham to fill a vacant U.S. Senate seat. Graham's seat was subject to a special election in 1950. In the Democratic primary he was challenged by conservative Willis Smith. Sanford was friends with Smith's son and respected him, but admired Graham and was "all out" for him. As YDC president, he had to keep his public stance on the primary neutral, though Smith's campaign accused him of showing his favoritism. Graham won a plurality of the vote in the first primary, and Smith called for a runoff election. The campaign then took on racial overtones, as Smith's supporters attacked Graham for his support of civil rights. Sanford wanted to improve Graham's support in Cumberland County, and approached Graham's local campaign manager to ask for a precinct he could canvass. He then took a job working in the Cumberland Mills area south of Fayetteville. During this time he kept a notebook where he jotted down lessons he was learning from campaigning. Of the 25 to 30 pages he filled, Sanford reflected, "I learned one thing. That is, don't ever let them get off the defensive. Frank Graham let them get off the defensive. He was just so nice and sweet." Graham won the Cumberland Mills precinct but lost the statewide primary. Sanford shortly thereafter visited Graham and vowed "to get even, to rectify that injustice."

=== North Carolina Senate tenure ===
In 1952 Sanford ran for a seat in the 10th district in the North Carolina Senate, defeating a former legislator in the Democratic primary with 75 percent of the vote and facing no opposition in the general election. He was sworn in on January 7, 1953, and served one term to 1955, deciding not to run for a second term. (Note: There was a rotation agreement in place concerning the Senate seat Sanford held which guaranteed that a candidate from a different county in the district would be allowed to run. Sanford thought it would be futile to challenge the custom and was more interested in seeking the governorship.) He served on the Judiciary, Education, Conservation and Development, and Finance committees, but did not get his desired seat on the Appropriations committee. Sanford shared a room with another legislator at the Sir Walter Hotel in Raleigh while the North Carolina General Assembly was in session and worked at his law firm in Fayetteville in the evenings and on weekends. He found his legislative tenure dull and restrictive. He mostly worked on minor legislation affecting local issues, but developed a rapport with several political journalists, who sought him for quotes on their stories about statewide affairs.

=== Managing Scott's U.S. Senate campaign ===
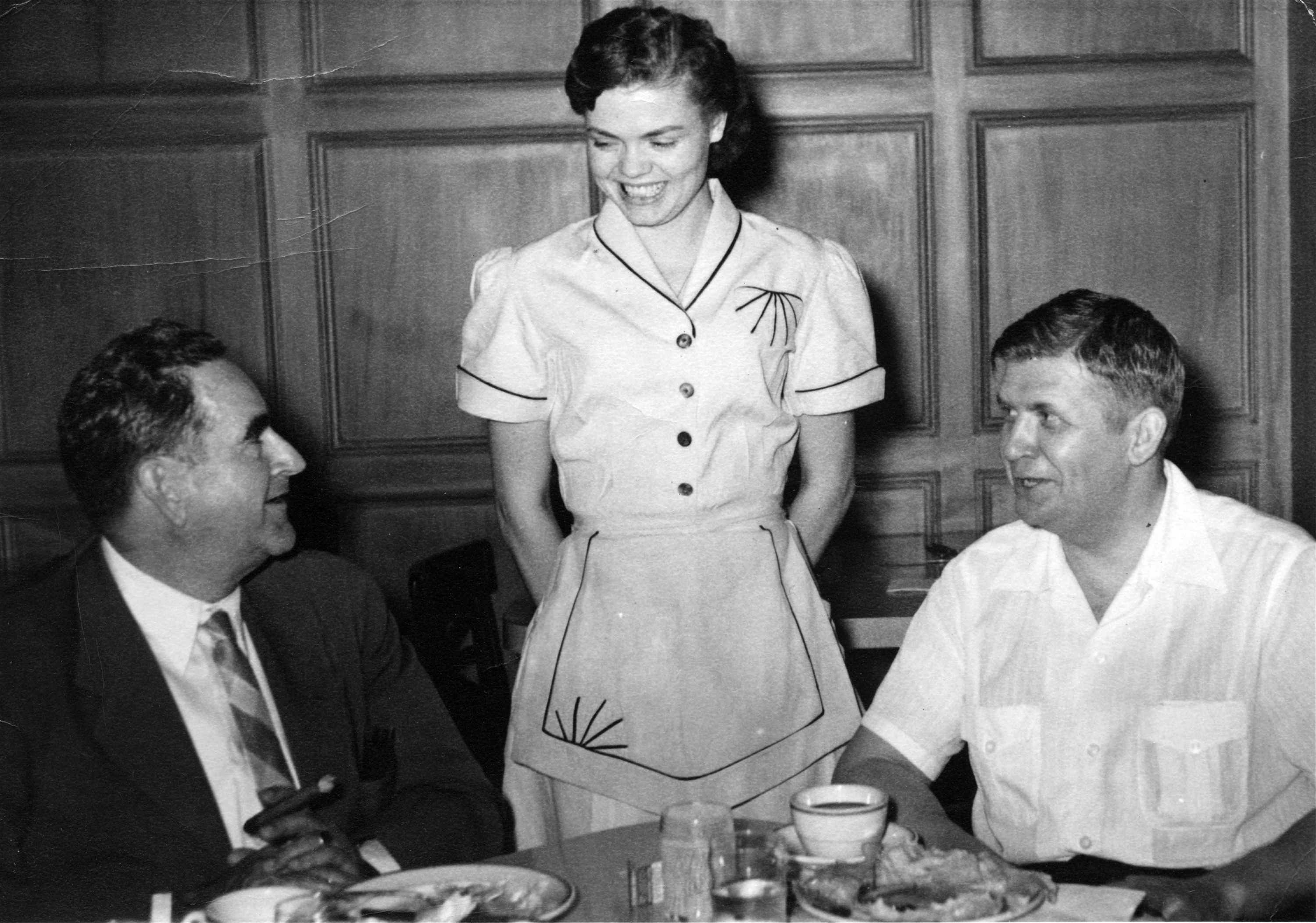
W. Kerr Scott (left) and Sanford (right) at a restaurant circa 1953

While in the state senate Sanford befriended Ralph H. Scott, brother of former Governor Kerr Scott. In 1953 when Kerr Scott began mulling a 1954 campaign for the U.S. Senate, Ralph, Capus M. Waynick, and Graham all advised him to hire Sanford as his campaign manager, hoping he could gain Scott more young supporters. Sanford temporarily left his law practice and took the job, living off of a bank loan in the interim. Scott declared his candidacy in early 1954. Sanford tried to temper Scott's abrasive public image by preparing uncontroversial speeches for him, though Scott reportedly tore many of these up before attending campaign events. Sanford also assisted Scott in crafting a public stance on racial issues in wake of the United States Supreme Court's 1954 decision in Brown v. Board of Education mandating the desegregation of public schools. He wrote a speech read by Scott insisting on the candidate's support for segregated education and separate but equal schools. Scott's opponent in the Democratic primary, Alton Lennon, attempted to portray Scott as a weak segregationist. When a leaflet ostensibly from a black civic group began to circulate in the last week of the primary emphasizing Scott's appointments of black officials during his time as governor—information that would damage his support among white voters—Lennon's campaign organization claimed it had no connection to them. Sanford recruited a union member to infiltrate Lennon's campaign, and through this was able to discover that it was printing and distributing copies of the leaflets. Sanford leaked the information to The News & Observer, which ran a story on the intrigue. He also called for a federal investigation and sent telegrams to Lennon campaign managers threatening to sue them if they distributed more leaflets. Scott won the Democratic nomination and the general election. In 1956 Sanford, at Scott's encouragement, considered challenging Luther H. Hodges in the Democratic gubernatorial primary. He later decided against it and attempted unsuccessfully with Scott's allies to recruit a different challenger.

== Gubernatorial career ==
=== 1960 campaign and election ===
Sanford began finding supporters and fundraising in preparation for his gubernatorial bid in 1959. On February 4, 1960, he declared his candidacy for governor in Fayetteville. He focused on the improvement of education and increased economic growth during his campaign. The other candidates in the Democratic primary were North Carolina Attorney General Malcolm Buie Seawell, state legislator John D. Larkins, and law professor I. Beverly Lake Sr. Lake declared that preservation of racial segregation and the state's existing social order would be the main theme of his campaign, worrying Sanford, who wished to avoid race becoming a large topic of discussion in the contest. Larkins and Seawell both ran as fiscal conservatives and moderates on issues of race. As Sanford was expected to place first in the initial primary, Larkins and Seawell focused their rhetorical criticisms against him, while Lake drew upon increasing support for his segregationist stances. Sanford resorted to only minor criticisms of his opponents. Voter turnout in the May primary broke all previous records for turnout in state primary elections with a 16 percent increase. Sanford placed first with 269,463 votes, Lake placed second with 181,692 votes, and both Larkins and Seawell earned less than 20 percent of the votes.

In declaring that he would contest Sanford in the Democratic primary runoff, Lake insisted that he liked Sanford personally, but disapproved of his economic and racial policies. He criticized Sanford as a proponent of a "spend and tax" platform and pledged to oppose the National Association for the Advancement of Colored People (NAACP) and ensure that schools remained segregated. Feeling he could not afford to be too polite in his response, Sanford countered with hostility, saying "Let's get this straight right now on the race issue ... I have been and will continue to oppose to the end domination or direction by the NAACP. Professor Lake is bringing on integration when he stirs this up. I don't believe in playing race against race or group against group." He further accused Lake of attempting to secure support by ruining race relations and assured that he could stave off federally-mandated integration whereas Lake would generate a confrontation that would hasten it. He also attacked Lake's professional background, insisting "I was raised around the cotton patches and tobacco fields of Scotland County, and I know how to handle the racial situation better than a theoretical college professor." He contended that Lake's focus on racial matters distracted from the more important subject of quality education. Lake increased his rhetorical attacks on Sanford in the following weeks, including accusing Sanford of having the near-total support of the "Negro bloc vote", which Sanford disputed.

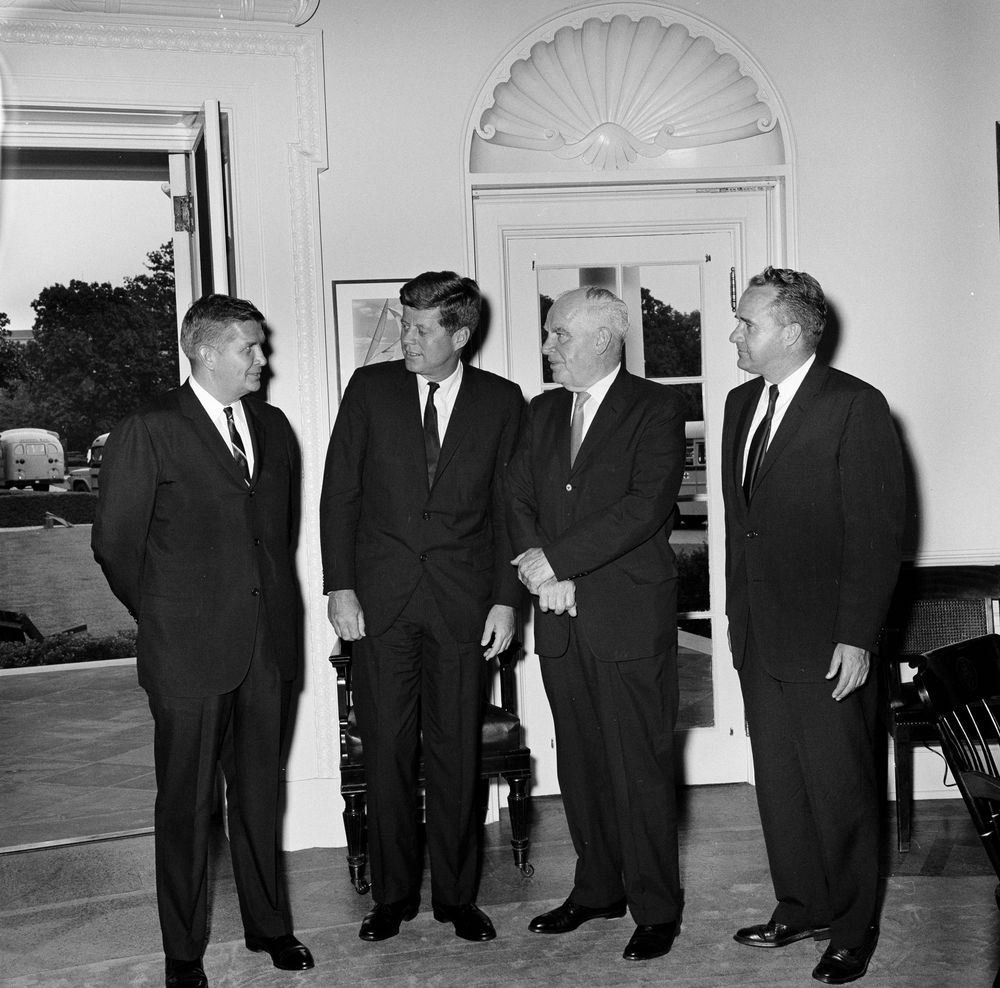
Sanford (left) with John F. Kennedy and Luther H. Hodges in 1961. Sanford's early decision to endorse Kennedy as a candidate for President of the United States upset Hodges and some of his own supporters.

Sanford received Seawell's endorsement and the quiet backing of Governor Hodges. He also cultivated a strong campaign organization—bolstered by the connections he had made during Scott's 1954 Senate campaign—and garnered the support of labor unions and education lobbyists. His network included former Scott supporters, Jaycees, and Young Democratic Clubs; he avoided relying on the traditional courthouse cliques. Winston-Salem businessman Bert Bennett, Sanford's friend and former classmate at UNC-Chapel Hill, provided critical leadership to his campaign and lined up key support behind him. Sanford was also innovative in the use of media consultants and polling data, being the first North Carolinian gubernatorial candidate to hire a pollster and prolifically use television advertisements. He ran as a progressive, but tried to avoid being labeled too liberal on issues of race. Businessmen and professionals who feared that Lake's positions on race would be unfavorable to North Carolina's economy backed Sanford. Sanford ultimately won the June 27 Democratic primary with a large lead, earning 352,133 votes in contrast to Lake's 275,905. (Note: Sanford's victory over Lake in the 1960 gubernatorial election was one of two instances in which a racial moderate defeated a staunch segregationist in a Southern state-wide race between 1957 and 1973.)

Meanwhile, preparations were underway for the 1960 Democratic National Convention in July. While most Southern politicians declared their support for Senator Lyndon B. Johnson of Texas for the party's nomination in the 1960 United States presidential election, Sanford endorsed Senator John F. Kennedy of Massachusetts—the favorite to win the nomination—bringing the senator more support from the North Carolina Democratic delegation than any other Southern state, but angering Hodges and some of his own supporters and stoking division in the state Democratic Party. Kennedy ultimately secured the nomination and selected Johnson as the vice presidential nominee.

Sanford faced a strong opponent for the governor's race, Robert L. Gavin, a moderate conservative Republican attorney. Gavin denounced Sanford as a tool of the liberal leadership of the national Democratic Party and organized labor. Although his reputation had been harmed by his early endorsement of Kennedy, Sanford enthusiastically campaigned for the two of them. He attacked Gavin for contradicting himself on several occasions and for displaying a lack of familiarity with certain issues. In the November election both Kennedy and Sanford won the offices they sought. Kennedy won the popular vote in North Carolina. Sanford won with 54.3 percent of the vote, approximately 131,000 votes over Gavin, but his performance was lackluster for a Democrat seeking state office at the time. Sanford remained proud of his gubernatorial victory for the rest of his life, feeling he had defeated a racist candidate (Lake) and avenged Graham's loss in 1950. Out of appreciation for Sanford's contribution to his campaign, Kennedy appointed Hodges to his cabinet as United States Secretary of Commerce. Sanford arranged for Bennett to assume the chairmanship of the North Carolina Democratic Party. In that capacity, Bennett organized continued backing for Sanford within the party and eased the way for many of Sanford's supporters to advance in its ranks.

Sanford was sworn in as Governor on January 5, 1961. In his inaugural address he declared, "There is a new day in North Carolina! ... Gone are the shackles. Gone are the limitations. Gone are the overwhelming obstacles. North Carolina is on the move and we intend to stay on the move." He became the youngest governor in North Carolina since Charles B. Aycock and the first born in the 20th century.

=== Education ===
In 1960, North Carolina spent $237 per pupil in public school (as opposed to New York's $562), paid some of the lowest salaries in the country to its teachers, had overcrowded high school classes, and had the lowest average number of years of education among its residents in the United States. Sanford believed that improved statewide education would raise North Carolina's low average wages. In his inaugural address, he affirmed his wish to increase spending for the purpose, saying, "If it takes more taxes to give our children this quality education, we must face that fact and provide the money. We must never lose sight of the fact that our children are our best investment. This is no age for the faint of heart." Sanford spent the first few months of his time in office lobbying for a legislative plan to increase state spending on education.

The centerpiece of Sanford's education platform was the Quality Education Program, which called for a 22 percent increase in average teacher pay, 33 percent more funds for instructional supplies, and a 100 percent increase in school library money. Sanford initially had difficulty figuring out how to fund his proposal, as the state already levied comparatively high income and corporate taxes, and a luxury tax on goods such as tobacco and soft drinks was likely to upset much of the populace. Many other elected state officials were fiscally conservative, and were likely to oppose any significant borrowing of money and raising debts. At the end of February 1961, Sanford decided to fund his proposals through the elimination of exemptions of the state's 3 percent sales tax on certain goods, including food and prescription drugs. The advanced taxes were controversial, and the conservative General Assembly was hesitant to pass them into law. Upon the convening of the General Assembly in March many legislators commented in private that the proposal was doomed to fail. Liberals and journalists criticized it as unfair to the poor, who would be hurt the most by a tax on food. Despite these doubts, Sanford had the good faith of legislative leaders, being friends with Lieutenant Governor Harvey Cloyd Philpott and working on building a relationship with Speaker of the State House of Representatives Joseph M. Hunt Jr.

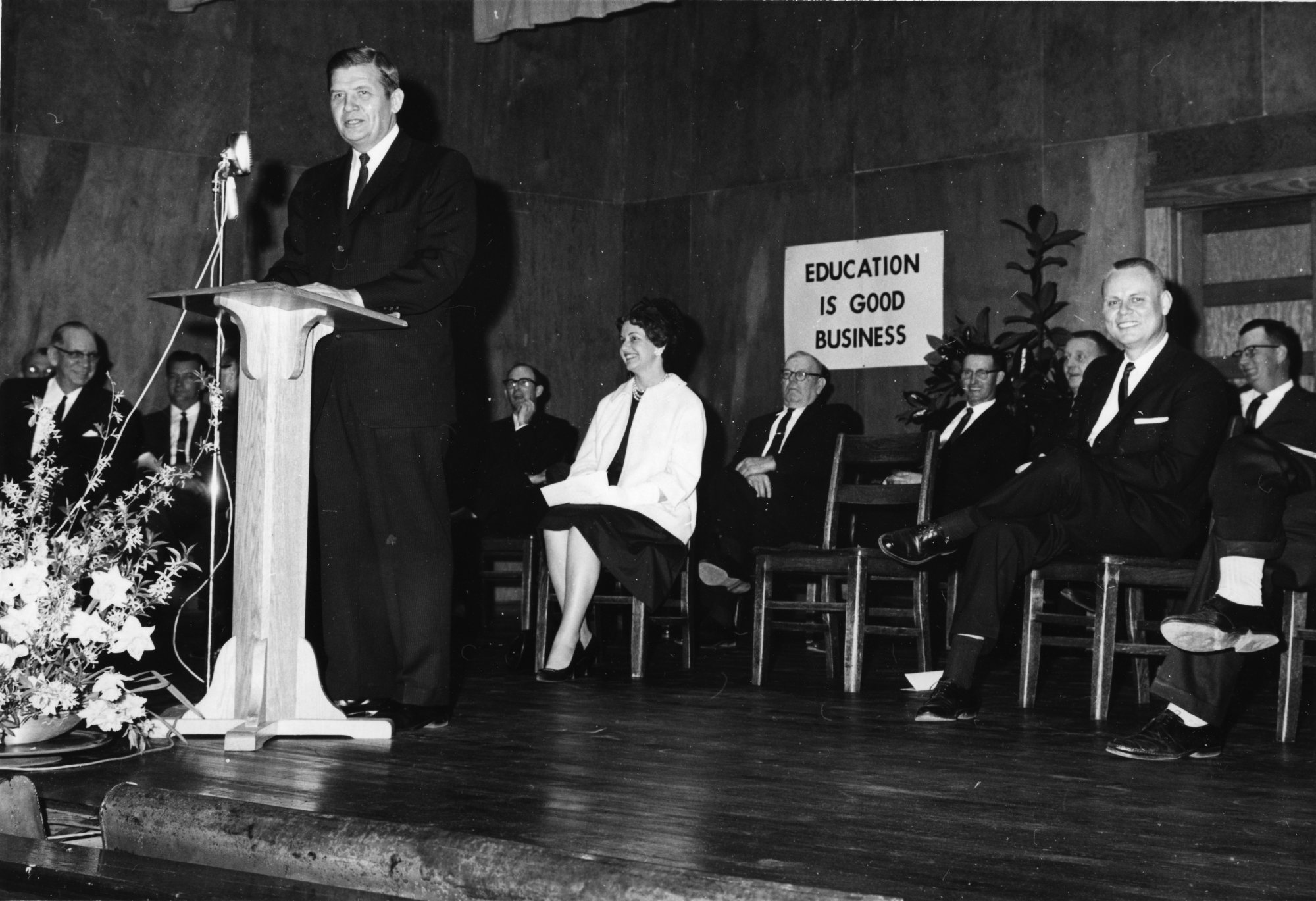
Sanford promoting public education at a school in Pender County, 1962

Sanford promoted his plan through a series of rallies across the state, arguing that North Carolina trailed most other states with respect to education and that the exemptions elimination was more acceptable than a 1 percent tax increase on all other items. He also intensively lobbied state legislators, inviting them to breakfast at the Governor's Mansion and visiting them at the Sir Walter Hotel. Aside from arguing for his program, Sanford granted political favors in exchange for support. He also actively challenged his critics to think of a better way to fund the education plan. Members of the press and disgruntled liberals backed down when they realized that without the new levy the education expansions would have to be scaled down.

Sanford's effort was ultimately successful and the General Assembly implemented his program and the taxes. Average teacher salaries for North Carolina quickly rose from 39th to 32nd among the states, and per-pupil expenditures rose from 45th to 38th. Sanford's successful lobbying gained national attention. He was subsequently invited to numerous events around the country to speak about his education plan, and he visited thirty states. The increase in taxes was nevertheless poorly received in North Carolina and resulted in a backlash; in November 1961 the electorate rejected 10 state bond proposals in a referendum—the first time a bond had been turned down since 1924—and a public opinion poll found that three fifths of the population disapproved of Sanford's performance as Governor. The referendum defeat demoralized Sanford's staff. Though upset with the outcome and unapologetic in supporting the bonds, Sanford insisted on moving past the failure and focusing his attention elsewhere. In the 1962 elections the Democrats lost seats in the State House of Representatives. Sanford was disappointed, but he remained convinced that the tax proposal was the best way to fund his program and refused to heed calls to alter it.

In 1961 Sanford appointed a Governor's Commission on Education Beyond the High School under the leadership of Irving E. Carlyle. The commission produced a set of proposals in August 1962 aimed at increasing college enrollment in North Carolina. One of its recommendations was the consolidation of the state's "public junior colleges" and "industrial education centers" under a single system of community colleges. In May 1963 the General Assembly responded by creating a Department of Community Colleges under the State Board of Education. Sanford also convinced the legislature to establish the North Carolina School of the Arts to retain gifted students "in the fields of music, drama, the dance and allied performing arts, at both the high school and college levels of instruction" in their home state.

Sanford's policies ultimately resulted in the near-doubling of North Carolina's expenditures on public schools and the hiring of 2,800 additional teachers. However, he struggled to ensure the state's educational funding maintained parity with other states and matched with inflation. Despite convincing the legislature to appropriate an additional $50 million (equivalent to $525,815,217 in 2025) towards public schools during the 1963 session, by the end of his tenure North Carolina's national rankings in educational expenditures had fallen.

=== North Carolina Fund ===
Feeling that his education program had spent most of his political capital in the legislature, Sanford began seeking private support to fund anti-poverty efforts in North Carolina. While traveling across the state to promote his education plan, Sanford came to believe that much of the poverty in North Carolina was due to racial discrimination and the lack of economic opportunity for blacks. He thus concluded that any anti-poverty plan he created would have to address economic problems for both blacks and whites. In mid-1962 he met John Ehle, a novelist and professor whom he quickly took on as an adviser on public policy. With Ehle he met with leaders of the Ford Foundation, a private philanthropic organization, and discussed a variety of issues with them, including anti-poverty efforts. He also established contact with George Esser, an academic at UNC-Chapel Hill's Institute of Government, to ask him for potential uses of Ford Foundation funds in combating poverty. Sanford's aides organized a three-day tour of North Carolina in January 1963 for Ford Foundation leaders to convince them to fund an anti-poverty project. He worked to secure the support of the Z. Smith Reynolds Foundation and the Mary Reynolds Babcock Foundation, two smaller North Carolina philanthropic organizations, to bolster proposed grants from the Ford Foundation, and tapped the advice of John H. Wheeler, leader of the black business community in Durham. He also invited officials from the U.S. Department of Health, Education, and Welfare to come to North Carolina to work on coordinating federal efforts with the state project.

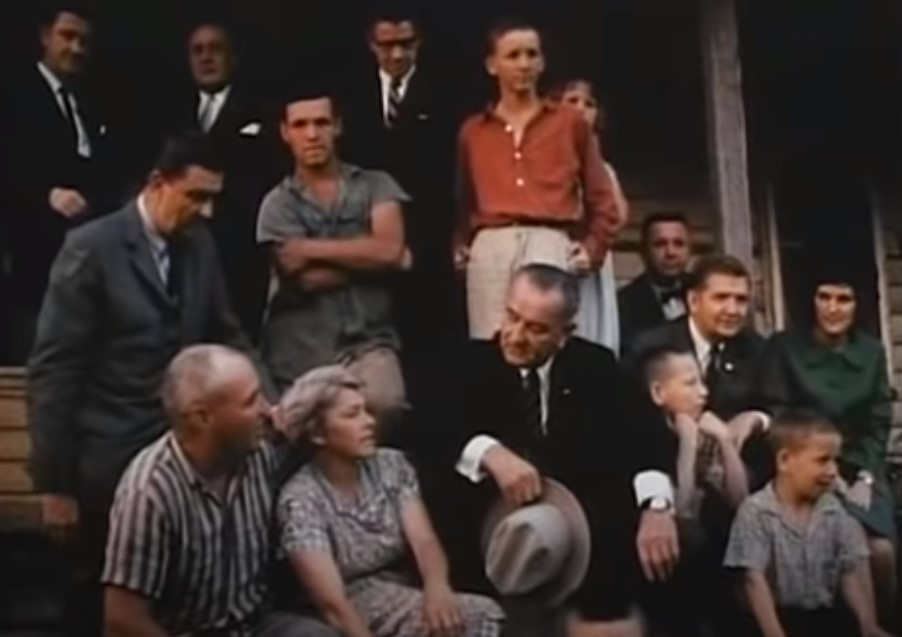
Sanford with President Lyndon B. Johnson on one of his "poverty tours" in Nash County, May 1964

In July 1963 the Ford Foundation committed $7 million (equivalent to $73,614,130 in 2025) to support an anti-poverty project in North Carolina. With additional grants from the other foundations, on July 18 Sanford and several civic leaders incorporated the North Carolina Fund. Its goals were to fight poverty and promote racial equality across the state. Since the North Carolina Fund was backed by private organizations and not financed by the state, it could be more flexible in addressing social issues while also avoiding political opposition from segregationists. Sanford was made chairman of the Fund's board and publicly announced its creation at a press conference on September 30. The organization had a racially integrated staff—which was unusual at the time—and consulted the local residents it aimed to assist. The Fund launched a program that utilized team teaching and provided for teacher aides, which was studied by President Johnson's administration and used as a model for Head Start. The Fund also supported eleven additional anti-poverty programs under another initiative which included the establishment of day care facilities and job training courses. These were also evaluated by the Johnson administration when it developed its War on Poverty programs. Sanford himself was disappointed by Johnson's War on Poverty and the agency responsible for it, the Office of Economic Opportunity, and told federal officials that the goal of their effort should not be to eliminate poverty—which Sanford thought impossible—as much as it should be to reduce the "causes of poverty." The Fund ceased operations in 1969.

=== Race relations and civil rights ===
When Sanford assumed the governorship, the state of racial affairs in North Carolina was essentially the same as it had been since the early 1900s. The vast majority of schools and public accommodations remained segregated, and nonwhite voter registration rates were significantly lower than those of whites. In his inaugural address, Sanford appealed for mutual respect and understanding between races and said that "no group of our citizens can be denied the right to participate in the opportunities of first-class citizenship." He enrolled his daughter Betsee and his son Terry in the integrated Murphy School (it was attended by a single black student), an action which received attention in the state and national press.

Sanford had considered racism to be immoral since he was student at the University of North Carolina, but initially wished to avoid dealing with issues of racial equality directly as governor, viewing it as a distraction from his main platform and politically dangerous. He had no planned strategy or agenda for the issue. However, he soon felt that as governor he had to take some action to address the growing tension in the United States due to the increasing activity of the civil rights movement. Shortly after taking office, he began appointing black professionals to state offices. Ultimately, he placed over three dozen blacks on state boards, commissions, and committees. He also consulted black community and business leaders on civil rights issues. In 1961 Sanford and the chairman of the Board of Conservation and Development, Skipper Bowles, decided to integrate North Carolina's state parks. Sanford generally believed that the use of persuasion and appeals to decency instead of invoking the law and employing force would mollify segregationists and lead to social change. He thought that the "basic goodness of people" would prevail in racial matters, and was often disappointed to encounter hostility from North Carolinians opposed to desegregation.

In May 1961 a multiracial group of civil rights activists known as Freedom Riders prepared to enter North Carolina on intercity buses to ensure the desegregation of them and related transit facilities in the South. Under Sanford's orders, the State Highway Patrol monitored the buses' movements and guarded against potential violence from angry segregationist whites. Throughout his tenure Sanford would deploy state police at civil rights demonstrations to maintain order and deter violence, but he never used them to disperse demonstrators. He later said, "It was up to us to keep the order and let them demonstrate, which was constitutional. It was unthinkable to put them in jail for that." He also expressed support for President Kennedy's actions to maintain order during the integration of the University of Mississippi. Sanford remained conscious of the desires of the white constituency which had elected him, and in one instance wrote federal officials to request that a group of white North Carolinian army reservists be reassigned from the predominantly black army unit to which they were posted. Sanford let the matter drop after the United States Department of Defense refused to honor his request. Journalists often wrote about Sanford's actions regarding racial issues and dubbed him a leading moderate. He enjoyed the media attention, but shied away from being portrayed as party to a conflict with the South's more hardline segregationist governors.

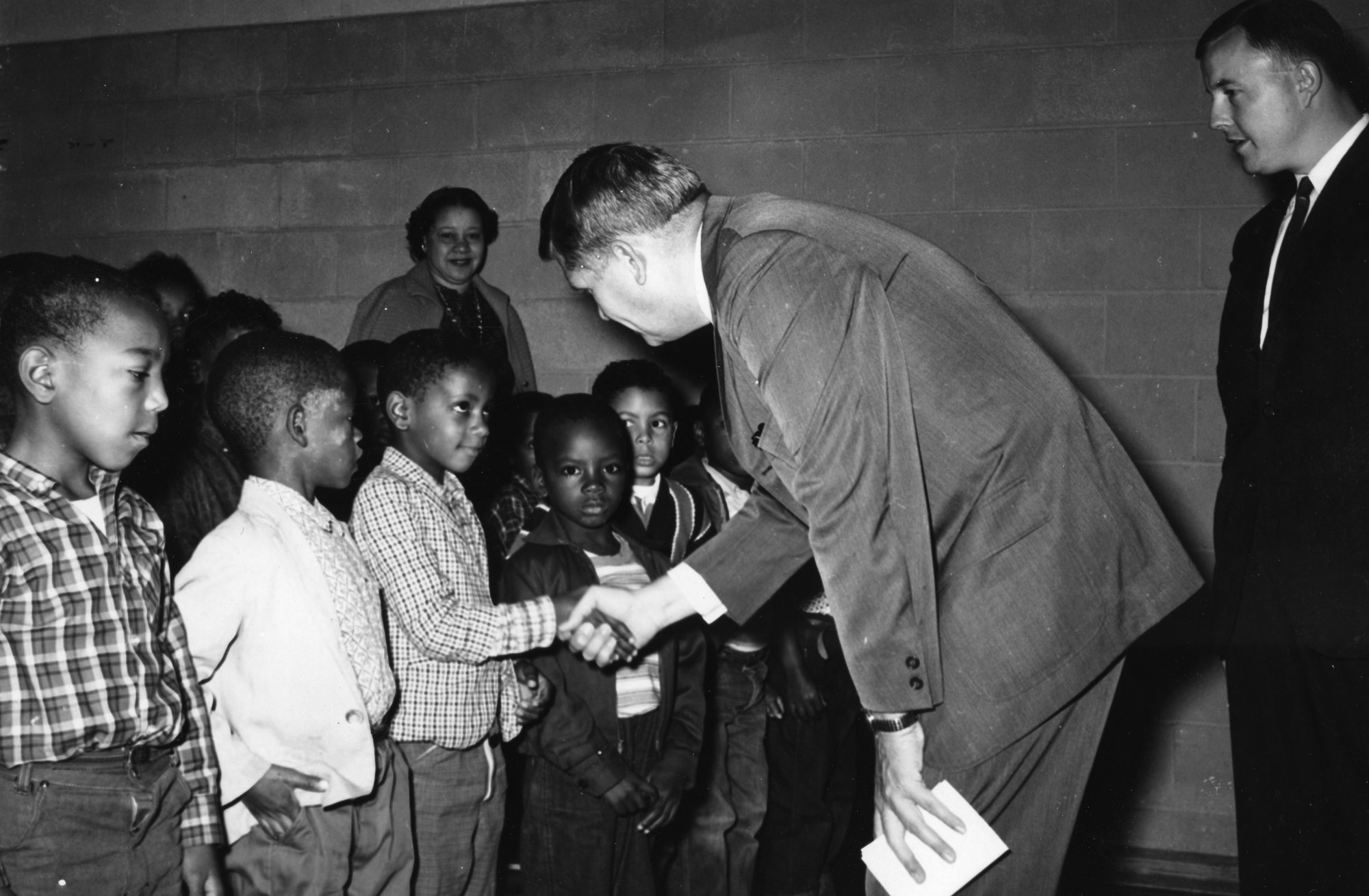
Sanford with black schoolchildren in Alexander County, 1962

Sanford's cautious stance on civil rights and racial issues began to change while he traveled across North Carolina to visit schools to promote his education program. Sanford visited both white and black schools and encouraged the students to pursue their education as means of securing economic prosperity in the future. Over time he grew uncomfortable saying this to black schoolchildren, later explaining, "I had the sickening feeling that every time I talked to them I was saying words that were a mockery ... I was talking about opportunities that I knew, and I feared they knew, didn't exist, no matter how hard they might work in school." Sanford was also moved to reconsider his views after discovering that many elderly blacks in Raleigh were—to his surprise—dissatisfied with the status quo and financially supporting student protestors.

Once resolved that he had to take more action to support racial equality, Sanford began making statements in favor of it. In October 1962, he said that poverty in North Carolina was worsened by the lack of economic opportunity for blacks and that whites would have to handle the "difficult problems of race" in a "spirit of Christian fellowship". He subsequently drafted a speech entitled "Observations for a Second Century" which directly called for the support of civil rights. Sanford shared his work with over 100 of his associates; most were supportive of his aims, but others feared the consequences his statement would have on the Democratic Party. On January 18, 1963, Sanford delivered his address at the Carolina Inn before the North Carolina Press Association. In the speech he called for an end to racially discriminatory employment practices—making him the first Southern governor to do so—saying, "The time has come for American citizens to give up this reluctance, to quit unfair discrimination, and to give the Negro a full chance to earn a decent living for his family and to contribute to higher standards for himself and all men." The same day Sanford announced the creation of the Good Neighbor Council, a biracial panel aimed at developing voluntary nondiscriminatory hiring practices and encouraging youth to prepare for gainful employment. The council did not have any provision to enforce its recommendations and thus its impact was minimal. Sanford also requested that the heads of state agencies adopt nondiscriminatory hiring policies and supported a bill that reduced racial barriers in the North Carolina National Guard.

Ultimately, Sanford's attempts at reform did not significantly alter employment dynamics in the state and only benefited a minority of blacks. The racial integration of public schools also made little progress during his tenure. Many young black people felt Sanford was not doing enough to address their concerns. In May 1963, 500 black student demonstrators gathered on the lawn of the Governor's Mansion and chanted for the governor to come out. Sanford told them, "If you want to talk to me at any time about your plans and your problems, let my office know. You have not come to me with any requests." When one of the demonstrators yelled that Sanford should have already been aware of their grievances without any specific requests, Sanford responded, "I'm not dictator, son. You're in a democracy." The group booed him and eventually left the premises.

In late May and early June, 400 black students from North Carolina Agricultural and Technical College in Greensboro were arrested for breaking segregationist practices in cafeterias and movie theaters. Sanford arranged for their release and had them returned to the college campus. Later in June, he summoned 150 black civic leaders to the North Carolina State Capitol where he told them that he would not "let mass demonstrations destroy us." He told them that their enemy was not white people; instead, it was "a system bequeathed to us by a cotton economy, kindled by stubbornness, intolerance, hotheadedness, North and South exploding into war and leaving to our generation the ashes of vengeance, retribution, and poverty. The way to fight this common enemy is education." In early July, Sanford convened a meeting of over 200 municipal officials and established a Mayors Coordinating Committee to address civil rights concerns.

In January 1964, James Farmer and Floyd McKissick of the Congress of Racial Equality demanded that the city of Chapel Hill, already one of the most integrated communities in the state, fully desegregate by February 1 or face a wave of demonstrations. Sanford released a statement of reproach towards the ultimatum and promised municipal officials his support. He later said, "I felt that I had been pushed around long enough." The following month activists went through with their protests, heightening local tensions and resulting in numerous arrests. Sanford hosted Farmer and McKissick at the Governor's Mansion in an attempt to broker a solution, but the situation was not resolved until a local committee reached an agreement between the demonstrators and municipal officials.

=== Later tenure ===
Kennedy's personal secretary, Evelyn Lincoln, stated that Kennedy told her he was going to remove Johnson as vice president from his electoral ticket in the 1964 presidential election and was considering replacing him with Sanford. Sanford later dismissed these rumors, feeling that such an action was not politically advantageous and would have damaged Kennedy's election prospects in the South. (Note: Presidential adviser Larry O'Brien also dismissed the notion that Johnson would be replaced.) Kennedy was assassinated on November 22, 1963. Sanford's office issued a brief statement, calling the event "overwhelming". Sanford and his family attended Kennedy's state funeral in Washington, D.C. The assassination came at a time when Sanford had been lobbying Kennedy to consider locating a large environmental research center in North Carolina. The decision then fell to Johnson, who succeeded Kennedy as the president and had to consider pressure from other politicians that wanted the facility in their own respective states.

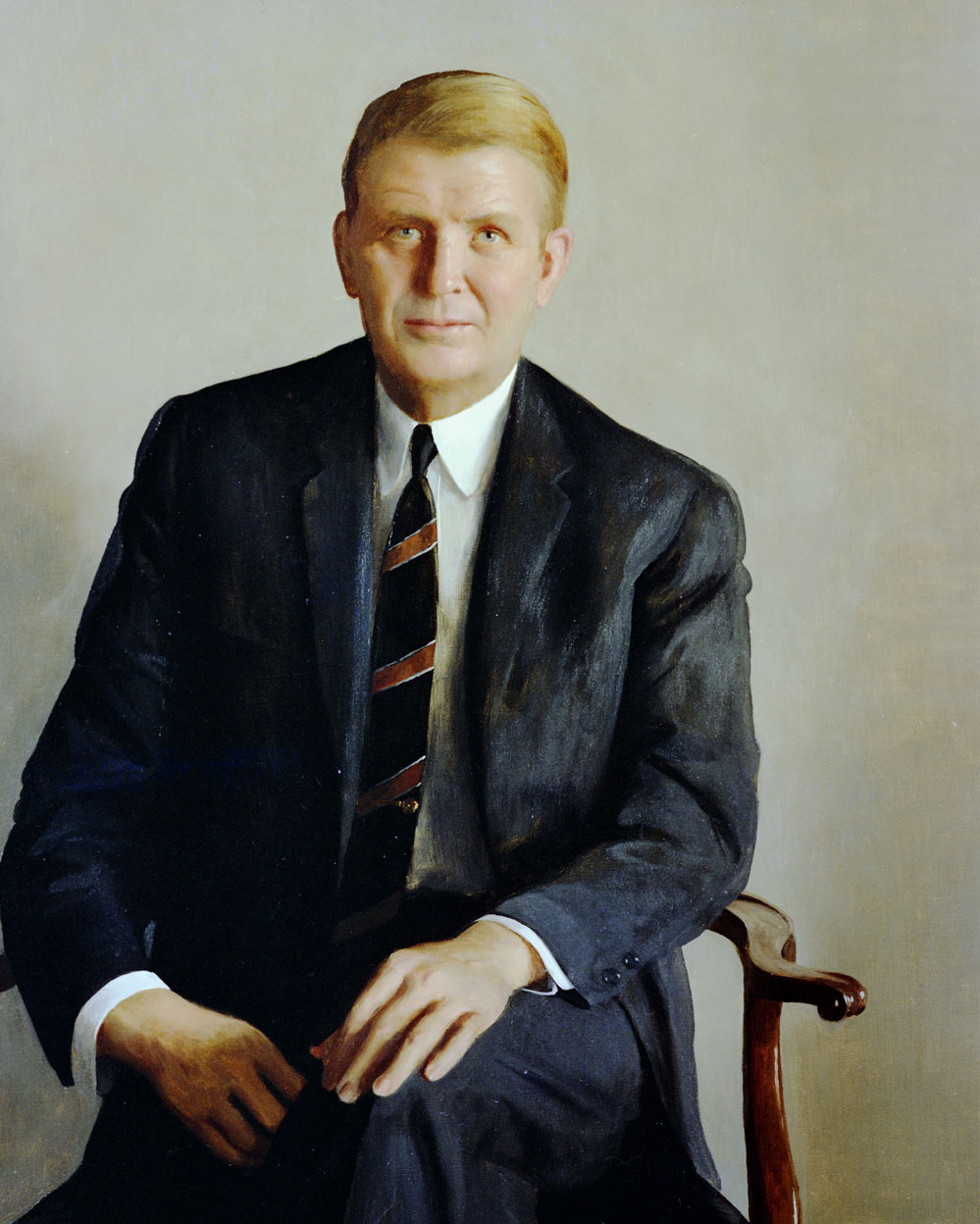
Sanford's portrait from his tenure as governor

Sanford's racial policies upset North Carolina's white populace, though he was able to contain white backlash throughout his administration. During the 1964 North Carolina gubernatorial election, L. Richardson Preyer, a supporter of Sanford, faced conservative Dan K. Moore in the Democratic primary election. Sanford was constitutionally restricted from seeking a successive term. He had originally wanted Lieutenant Governor Philpott to succeed him, but Philpott had unexpectedly died in August 1961. He instead endorsed Preyer while Lake endorsed Moore. At the same time Johnson was running for election as president, and Sanford actively supported him. The gubernatorial contest devolved into a de facto referendum on Sanford's tenure, particularly his handling of race matters, and Moore secured the nomination. Lake dubbed the outcome a popular rejection of Sanford's service. Sanford felt betrayed by civil rights leaders, since he thought that their insistence on continuing demonstrations in Chapel Hill had aggravated white resentment and damaged Preyer's electoral prospects.

Anticipating that Moore and his allies would attempt to dismantle some of his initiatives upon assuming office, Sanford spent the last six months of his term trying to ensure the protection of his projects, placing one of Moore's top aides on the board of the North Carolina Fund and transferring a summer internship program for college students interested in state politics out of the governor's office and into UNC's Institute of Government. Sanford also urged the Research Triangle Institute to study affordable housing proposals and established a commission to plan for the future of development and growth in the Piedmont Crescent region. He traveled to Washington, D.C. to have his official portrait made and then went to New York to present Jacqueline Kennedy with North Carolina's financial contribution to the construction of the Kennedy Library. In early December, Sanford commuted the sentences of several Chapel Hill protesters. Shortly before leaving office in January 1965, he reached a deal with the Johnson administration for the $25 million environmental research facility to be located at the Research Triangle Park. In his final publicly broadcast address as governor, he asserted, "If our weapon against poverty and bigotry is education, we can conquer all battles and make North Carolina a leader of all the rest of the nation." He was succeeded as Governor of North Carolina by Moore on January 8, 1965.

== Immediate post-gubernatorial career ==
By the time his term was over, Sanford was very unpopular in North Carolina. Discontent over the sales tax on food gradually faded and his favorability ratings improved over subsequent years. After leaving office, he returned to Fayetteville and opened a new law firm in Raleigh with some of his former colleagues. In 1966, he published But What About the People?, a book about his tenure as governor. The following year, he released Storm Over the States, a study of the role of state governments in handling American public issues.

In 1967, Sanford mulled over the possibility of challenging conservative Democrat Sam Ervin for his U.S. Senate seat, who he thought of as a "constitutional racist". He ultimately decided against it after concluding that the contest would divide the Democratic Party and he would lose on account of his civil rights positions. He then agreed to serve as President Johnson's campaign manager in the 1968 presidential election just before Johnson's withdrawal on March 31. Vice President Hubert Humphrey then became the presumptive Democratic nominee for president, and considered including Sanford on his ticket as the vice presidential candidate. Sanford attended the 1968 Democratic National Convention, and delivered the speech seconding Humphrey's nomination for the party's endorsement. He was embittered by the disdain with which the delegates treated the outgoing President Johnson, and disapproved of Humphrey's choice of Senator Edmund Muskie of Maine for as his vice presidential candidate. Johnson offered to appoint him United States Secretary of Agriculture for the last few months of his term, but Sanford declined. He subsequently served as chairman for the Citizens for Humphrey-Muskie Committee and in that position helped fundraise for Humphrey's campaign and encouraged the candidate to break from Johnson's views on the controversial Vietnam War. Humphrey lost the election to Republican Richard Nixon.

== President of Duke University ==
=== Selection ===
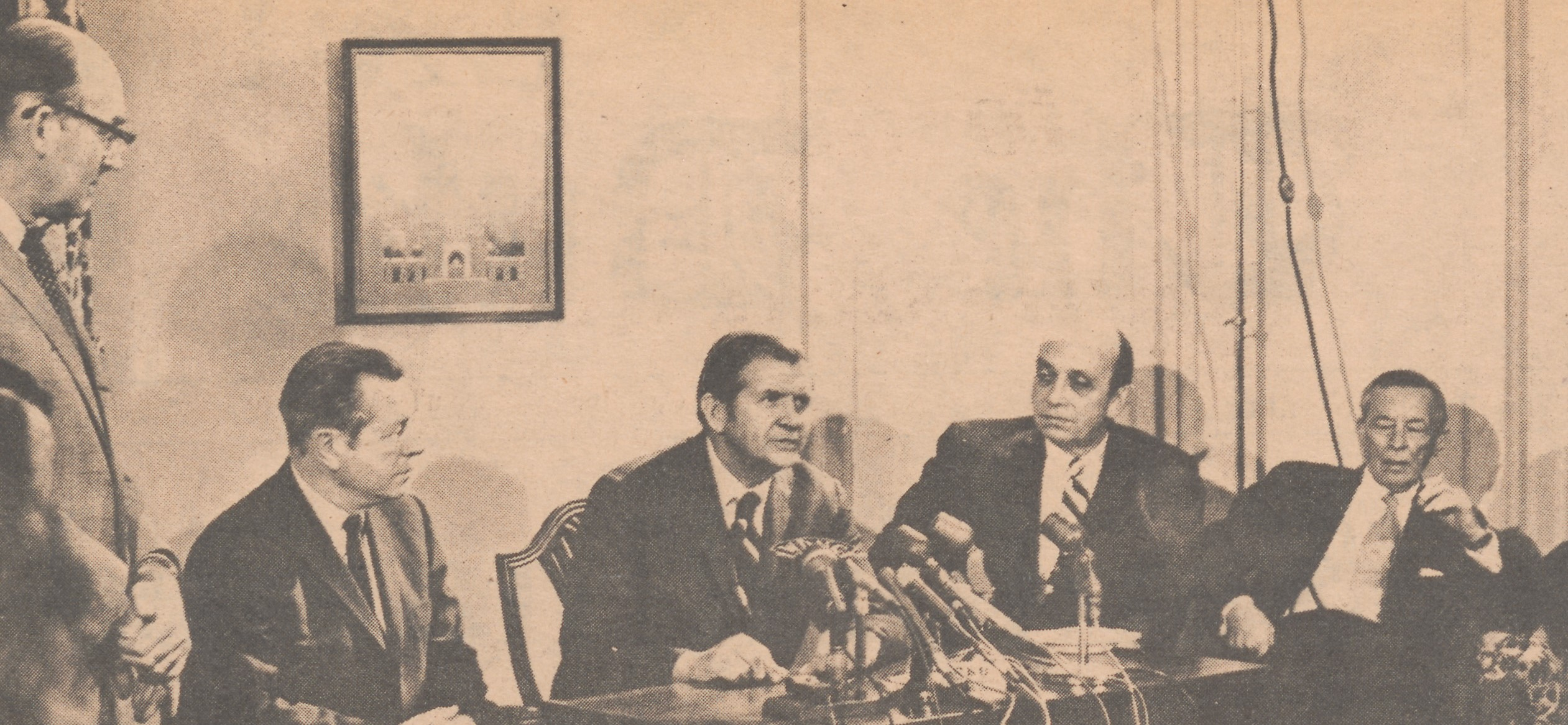
Sanford's first press conference as presumptive President of Duke University, December 14, 1969

In 1969, the private Duke University in Durham, North Carolina, was wracked by a wave of student unrest over the Vietnam War and civil rights issues. Unable to contain the situation, University President Douglas Knight resigned and the board of trustees began searching for a new president. Sanford heard rumors of his consideration and, though he thought he would like the job, believed it was unlikely that it would ultimately be offered to him. During this time he focused on work at his law firm while turning down several prospective private sector positions, as he wanted to keep his options open in case he wanted to run for public office again. In late October 1969, the university's presidential search committee officially contacted Sanford and began discussing how he would approach the job. On December 13, the committee informed Sanford that he had been chosen for the presidency. He assumed the responsibilities of the job on April 2, 1970, and was officially inaugurated in a ceremony on October 17, 1970. On his first day as university president, Sanford removed a cap on Jewish enrollment, allowing the number of Jewish students to significantly increase over the following years.

=== Finances ===
When Sanford assumed the university's presidency he sought to improve the school's status. At the time it was experiencing a budget deficit and suffered from a small endowment. Seeking to increase donations, he sought to increase the school's enrollment from North Carolinian public school students and private school students from elsewhere. He hired Croom Beatty, a boarding school fundraiser, as associate director for admissions and tasked him with finding children at private schools who came from wealthy backgrounds. Croom would canvas the private schools for such students and, if he determined that their enrollment at Duke would financially benefit the university, he would recommend Sanford personally review their application—even if they had earned lower grades or test scores. Sanford also personally recommended the consideration of applications from children of prospective donors who he had learned of from various contacts. He also directed baseball coach Tom Butters to spend the summer of 1970 fundraising and sought out North Carolinian alumni to ask for their financial support. By the time of his departure, the alumni's annual giving total had climbed from $750,000 to almost $6 million, and the school's endowment had grown from $80 million to $200 million.

=== Relationship with the student body ===
Since students were generally suspicious of campus administration when Sanford assumed office, he took public actions to try and accommodate their wishes. He declared his opposition to the Vietnam War to assuage student protests and was receptive to a request from antiwar students to invite a war critic to campus. Following the shooting of student protesters at Kent State University in May 1970, Duke students boycotted classes and began planning mass demonstrations to close the school. Determined to prevent the university's operations from being interrupted, he refused to call police on campus and instructed his staff to make themselves available to students to hear their grievances while he went to the protestors' gatherings to engage with them. He encouraged the students to petition the federal government and canvas residents in Durham for their opinions on the war. He objected to Vice President Spiro Agnew's criticism of student protestors in a New York Times op-ed, writing, "The deep troubles of our society do not begin on college campuses, are not bred there, and are not centered there. Instead, our possibilities for resolving these troubles find their greatest hope on college campuses."

Sanford sought to increase student involvement in the running of the university, and hired upperclassmen to work in his office as assistants and researchers. He also designated students to serve as greeters and guides for visiting dignitaries and held social meetings with incoming freshmen at his house, eventually known as "Tea with Terry". From before his tenure students had complained about a lack of representation on the university board of trustees, and after some students refused to leave an early trustee meeting he negotiated a deal with them, whereby they would leave but a reporter from the student newspaper, The Chronicle, would stay to report on the proceedings and a committee would be formed to consider making the meetings public. The committee later agreed to the idea, and in late 1970 Sanford recommended a student representative be designated to sit with the board. The "radical" students on campus were surprised by his accommodating style. Duke graduate and local journalist Mark Pinksy told The New York Times, "He's just plain smarter than the radicals are. He's co-opted the hell out of them."

=== Regional issues and economic and government reform ===
In the fall of 1970, Sanford permitted Duke students leave to participate in congressional campaigns. That election season, numerous New South governors were elected across the Southern United States, including Dale Bumpers in Arkansas, Reubin Askew in Florida, John C. West in South Carolina, and Jimmy Carter in Georgia. Sanford held a grudge against Carter for using race-baiting tactics to defeat his friend Carl Sanders in the Democratic primary. These new governors mostly avoided racial rhetoric in office and advocated for governmental reform, triggering renewed national interest in the region. In a speech in May 1971, "The South's time has come after a century of being the whipping boy and the backward child [...] The South can lead the nation, must lead the nation—and all the better, because the nation has never been in greater need of leadership." Sanford suggested that the Southern states act in concert in their efforts to resolve regional issues; he proposed that a regional body be established to assist in coordinating growth and economic development in the South. Working with academics, he assisted in the foundation of the Southern Growth Policies Board on December 16, 1971.

In 1971 Sanford also recruited Joel Fleishman, one of his former aides in the governor's office, to come to Duke and establish a school for public policy. Fleishman created the Institute of Policy Studies and Public Affairs in January 1972. In July 1979 Sanford began a year-long sabbatical and used the time to write A Danger of Democracy, a book which proposed reforming political parties' presidential nomination processes.

=== Nixon presidential library ===
In 1981 Sanford entertained the idea of locating Nixon's presidential library and museum at Duke, where it could become a center of research and bolster the university's reputation. Sanford raised the subject with Nixon during a visit to the former president at Nixon's New York City office on July 28, 1981, and the former president was receptive to the idea. While Sanford tried to win over the faculty to his idea—many of whom disliked Nixon and were worried about his scandal-ridden reputation damaging the university—the media began reporting that Duke was a prospective site for the library. Opposition from professors mounted as they expressed concerns that the museum would become little more than a monument to Nixon while the most sensitive and valuable documents of his public career would not be kept in the library. Some called for Sanford's resignation. The Duke Academic Council, a governing body representing the university's faculty, voted to eliminate the museum from the offer and scale down the planned size of the library. Discouraged, Nixon declined Sanford's offer and established his library in Yorba Linda, California. Sanford originally planned to retire in 1982, but decided to stay longer to finish overseeing some developments and let the acrimony of the Nixon library debate fade. He officially resigned on July 4, 1985 and was replaced by H. Keith H. Brodie, his preferred successor.

=== Concurrent political activities ===
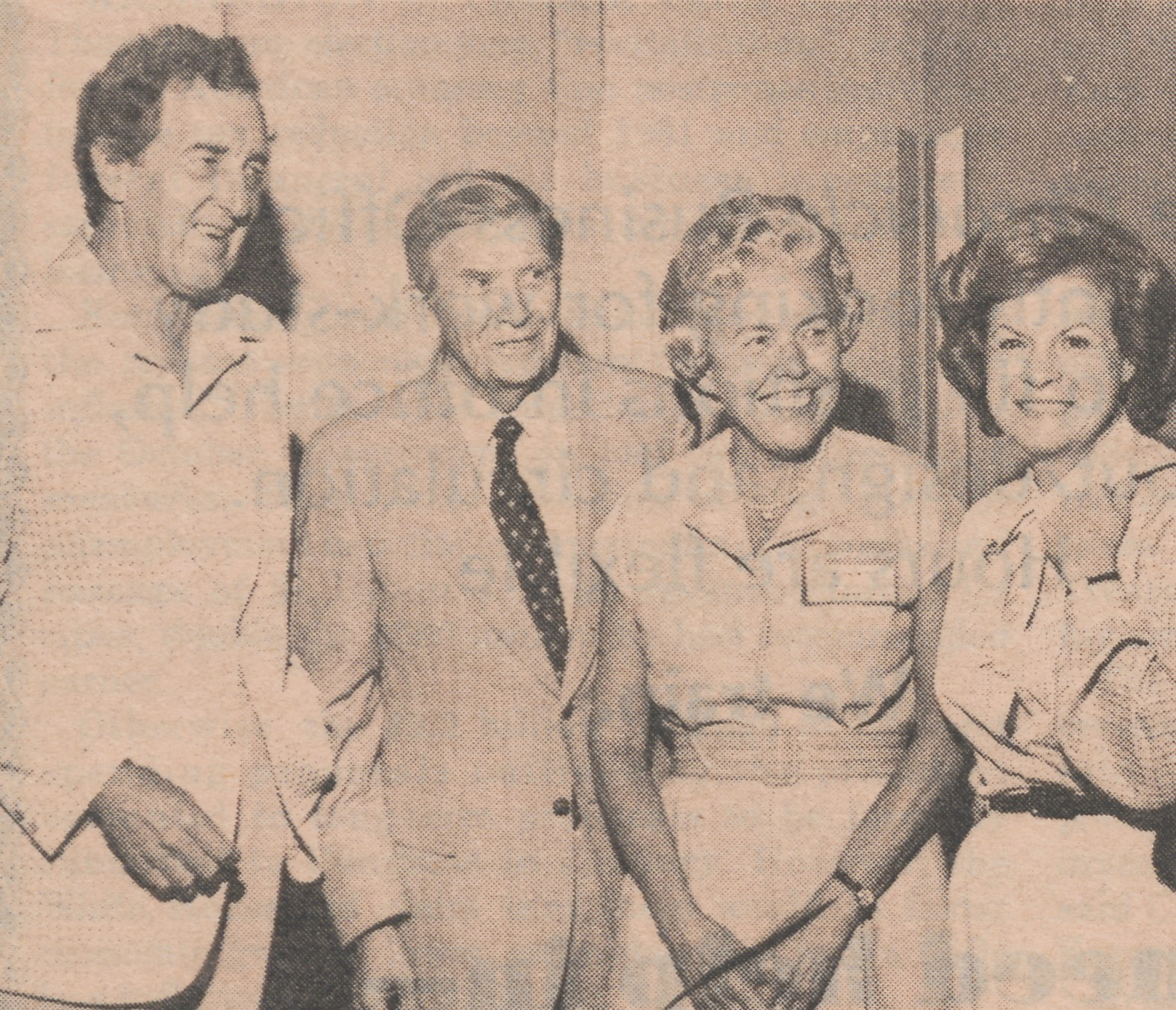
Sanford and his wife with U.S. Secretary of State Edmund Muskie and his wife Jane Muskie in 1980

Upon being invested as president of Duke, Sanford told a New York Times reporter that he had decided against any state-related political responsibilities through 1972, but had not pledged similarly about a national office, saying, "I won't campaign for it, but I've never made a Sherman-like statement that I wouldn't accept it." Privately, he maintained contact with some of his former political acquaintances such as Bennett, but felt that if he became too politically involved the board of trustees would fire him. Sanford believed that Nixon would be re-elected to the United States presidency and ruled out the possibility of seeking the Democratic nomination in the 1972 presidential primary. That January, several Duke students approached him to request his assent to a petition to put his name on the Democratic ballot, feeling that the slate of candidates in the primary was weak. Sanford himself thought Senator Edmund Muskie—who was gaining endorsements from party stalwarts—was an unremarkable candidate and was worried that liberals were uniting behind Senator George McGovern, and had encouraged Humphrey to re-seek nomination.

Sanford figured that the board of trustees would solve his dilemma by forcing him to stop the petition drive. The board argued over the affair, but ultimately decided to let Sanford launch a candidacy. His friends thought a presidential campaign was ill-advised, and North Carolina Governor Bob Scott—who had already pledged his support to Muskie—was angered when he learned of Sanford possibly entering the race. Sanford claimed to have firmly decided to contest the nomination after seeing Muskie's public reaction to the Canuck letter. According to biographers Howard E. Covington Jr. and Marion Ellis, "If there was anything that moved Sanford to make the leap in 1972, it was probably his desire to challenge Wallace and show the nation that all Southern politicians were not demagogues." George Wallace was the Governor of Alabama and an avowed racial segregationist. Sanford felt that Wallace did not truly believe in segregation and employed race-baiting tactics as an opportunity to gain votes. He later said of Wallace, "I always thought George was just a pure hypocrite [...] George saw it as just a great game, just another issue to be played, and he played it the way it was an advantage to play it." He publicly declared his candidacy for the Democratic nomination for the presidency on March 8. He stated his intention to stay on Duke's campus and campaign on the weekends to aim to get the support of 100 delegates before the Democratic convention.

Some media response was positive, but the press was generally skeptical of Sanford's candidacy. He struggled to gain media attention, and ran on a platform of eliminating tax loopholes for rich people, establishing price controls on food, increasing Social Security payments by 25 percent, supporting equal rights for women, creating a national health insurance plan, and devolution of power from the federal government to the states. While focusing most of his efforts on North Carolina, he also built a small national campaign organization. One poll showed Wallace in first place in North Carolina with 33 percent of the vote and Sanford with 28 percent; the latter was encouraged, but anxious that Congresswoman Shirley Chisholm would draw away black voters he needed to overcome Wallace. On the night before the election, he conducted a television appearance where voters asked him questions about his platform. Responding to a question about the seriousness of his candidacy for the presidency or if he was seeking a position to bargain for another office, he said, "I'd rather be president of Duke University than vice president and furthermore I'd rather be unemployed than be in the cabinet."

Wallace won North Carolina with over 40 percent of the total, securing 408,000 votes. Sanford received 304,000, while Chisholm got 61,000. Sanford's friend Sam Poole said that the loss "was really a very low point in his life." Despite the setback, he decided to continue his campaign to the convention in Miami. He managed only a fifth-place finish with 77.5 delegate votes. Undeterred, Sanford began preparations two years later for a run for the 1976 Democratic presidential nomination. Announcing his candidacy on June 1, 1975, he juggled campaign appearances with his obligations as president of Duke. While campaigning in Massachusetts, he suffered sharp pains and was diagnosed with a heart murmur. On January 25, Sanford withdrew from the primaries, the first Democrat to do so that year. He was left near bankruptcy by his abortive candidacy, though his friend Paul Vick later assisted him in managing his finances and recouping some of his wealth. He thereafter refocused his time on running the university, and in 1977 he rejected President Jimmy Carter's offer to appoint him United States Ambassador to France. After retiring as president of Duke University, Sanford made an unsuccessful run for chairman of the Democratic National Committee in 1985, losing to Paul G. Kirk by a vote of 203–150.

== Senate career ==
=== 1986 campaign ===
In late 1985, Sanford began consulting his friends on the possibility of running in the 1986 Senate election. Sanford declared his candidacy in January 1986. The announcement surprised and embittered his longtime friend and political ally Lauch Faircloth, who had wanted to run for the seat with Sanford's support and was angered by rumors that Sanford had denigrated his own chances in an election. After the misunderstanding, Faircloth and Sanford did not speak with one another until shortly before the latter's death. Sanford won the Democratic primary with 409,394 votes, easily defeating the nine other candidates and marking the first time he had won a statewide election since 1960. His opponent in the general election was Republican U.S. House Representative Jim Broyhill as the incumbent senator, Republican John P. East, had declared his intention to retire. After East committed suicide on June 29, 1986, Broyhill was temporarily appointed to the seat on July 3, pending the election to fill it on November 4. During the campaign Sanford stressed his accomplishments as governor and his military service. Critics of Sanford primarily focused on three areas: his promotion of opportunities for minorities, "tax-and-spend" education funding, and his anti-poverty efforts. Sanford initially maintained a positive campaign, but attacked Broyhill as "no friend of education" and criticised his failure to minimize President Ronald Reagan's free trade policies which hurt the textiles industry after Broyhill released a television ad that condemned his imposition of the sales tax on food while serving as governor. Sanford defeated Broyhill by three percentage points in the November election earning about 60,000 more votes, securing victory in the contest to serve the last months of East's term and the subsequent six-year term. He was sworn in to office on December 10 by his friend and former law partner Judge James Dickson Phillips Jr. on the steps of the United States Capitol. He was sworn in again to the full six-year term on January 6, 1987.

At 69 years, 2 months, 15 days old, Sanford was the oldest elected U.S. Senator from North Carolina until Roy Cooper surpassed him in 2026.

=== Tenure ===
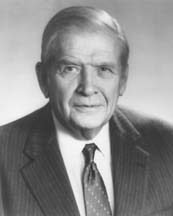
Terry Sanford's U. S. Senate portrait

Sanford felt uncomfortable in the Senate after being used to holding executive offices, writing, "We get so little done for all the energy we expend." He served on multiple Senate committees: Select Committee on Ethics (Chair); Special Committee on Aging; Budget; Banking, Housing, and Urban Affairs including the Subcommittee on International Finance and Monetary Policy and Subcommittee on Securities; and Foreign Relations including the Subcommittee on Near Eastern and South Asian Affairs (Chair), Subcommittee on African Affairs, and Subcommittee on Western Hemisphere and Peace Corps Affairs. As was custom among members of the majority party, Sanford presided over sessions of the Senate on several occasions. He stayed in an apartment near the Capitol, and usually reported to his office by 8:00 am and worked until returning home later in the evening. He usually returned to his house in Durham on the weekends.

During his Senate campaign, Sanford criticized President Reagan's policy towards the Contra War in Nicaragua, as the federal government funneled American financial support to the right-aligned Contras while they waged an insurgency against the leftist Sandinista government. Sanford hoped to propose an alternative solution to the conflict based upon the Marshall Plan. In February 1986, Sanford and Senator Chris Dodd traveled to Central America to study the issue. At the same time President Oscar Arias of Costa Rica was hosting a multilateral conference with representatives of nearby countries troubled by the conflict in Nicaragua. Sanford proposed to Arias that after the war ended a multinational working group be created to plan for economic redevelopment of the region. Arias was receptive to the idea, and soon after Sanford returned to the United States he delivered his first major speech before the Senate, supporting a resolution commending Arias' initiatives to host negotiations and end the Nicaraguan war. The resolution passed, 97 votes to 1. In June, Sanford announced the creation of an International Commission for Central American Recovery and Development to create an outline for regional development under the coordination of Duke University's Center for International Development Research. As with the North Carolina Fund, Sanford secured backing from private philanthropic organizations to fund the body's work. By the time the group had its first meeting in December, he had recruited 47 members including diplomats, scholars, and economists. Though Sanford was not a member of the body, it became known as the "Sanford Commission" for his role in its creation. He repeatedly returned to Central America to tour Nicaragua and observe Arias' peace process.

The commission published its report in 1989, recommending action taken to ensure human rights and the fulfillment of the economic necessities of the region's population. The document was endorsed by five Central American presidents. Sanford believed the commission's work hastened the end of the Contra War and reoriented local focus on economic recovery, reflecting, "I consider it the most significant thing I did in Washington." Nicaraguan President Daniel Ortega personally thanked Sanford for his efforts, and he was commended by his Senate colleagues Bob Dole and John Kerry. Sanford proposed a bill to appropriate federal funds to the commission's use, but it was not acted upon for years and was rivaled by North Carolina's senior U.S. Senator, Jesse Helms, who sought to attach statements to it calling on Central America to embrace free enterprise initiatives. Sanford found Helms' actions irksome, and though his bill finally passed the Senate in September 1991, the money it appropriated was never handed over.

Sanford kept a journal during his Senate tenure, and often wrote about his irritation with the body's deference to member seniority instead of better ideas, the existence of incomprehensible legislative rules, and jurisdictional feuds between committee chairs. He also perceived an increase in partisanship and a diminishing willingness for compromise. He strongly disliked Helms, writing, "I think his service in the Senate has been largely of zero value to North Carolina...He has a negative attitude about everything, and it is very difficult to find anything up here that he has done that has any lasting value." The two usually maintained cordial relations, though in one instance Helms angrily denounced Sanford to the press after the latter made a joke at Helms' expense during a committee hearing. Helms later apologized.

From early on in his tenure Sanford was troubled by the Reagan administration's growing deficit spending and Congress' toleration of it. He crafted an "Honest Budget Bill" that mandated a balanced budget, introduced taxes to increase revenue, and separated the Social Security Trust Fund from other government trusts. A few of his proposals were ultimately incorporated into other measures. During the contentious Robert Bork Supreme Court nomination, Sanford was chosen by Senate Democrats to deliver a televised address explaining their opposition to Bork's nomination. Sanford stated that Bork was more interested in affirming his own personal opinions that conducting proper jurisprudence, and when the nomination came to a full vote before the Senate, Sanford voted against his nomination.

As a senator, Sanford was involved in efforts to recruit Democratic candidates for the 1988 presidential election. After unsuccessfully attempting to recruit Arkansas Senator Dale Bumpers and New York Governor Mario Cuomo, he endorsed Tennessee Senator Al Gore's campaign, privately dismissing Jesse Jackson for running a "purely racist campaign". Gore later dropped out and Sanford dutifully backed Democratic nominee Michael Dukakis, although he found Dukakis' campaign staff arrogant and uncooperative. Dukakis lost the election to Republican George H. W. Bush, and Democrats performed poorly in North Carolina elections, leaving Sanford as the leading elected North Carolina Democrat. In the contests' aftermath he increasingly bemoaned the leftward lean of the national Democratic Party, objecting to Ron Brown's assumption of the chair of the Democratic National Committee and expressing concern that the Democrats were "perceived by far too many people as being the black man's party", thus losing support from moderate whites. Sanford wrote in his journal that "the lingering race prejudice does, indeed, drive a great many white people away from the Democratic Party".

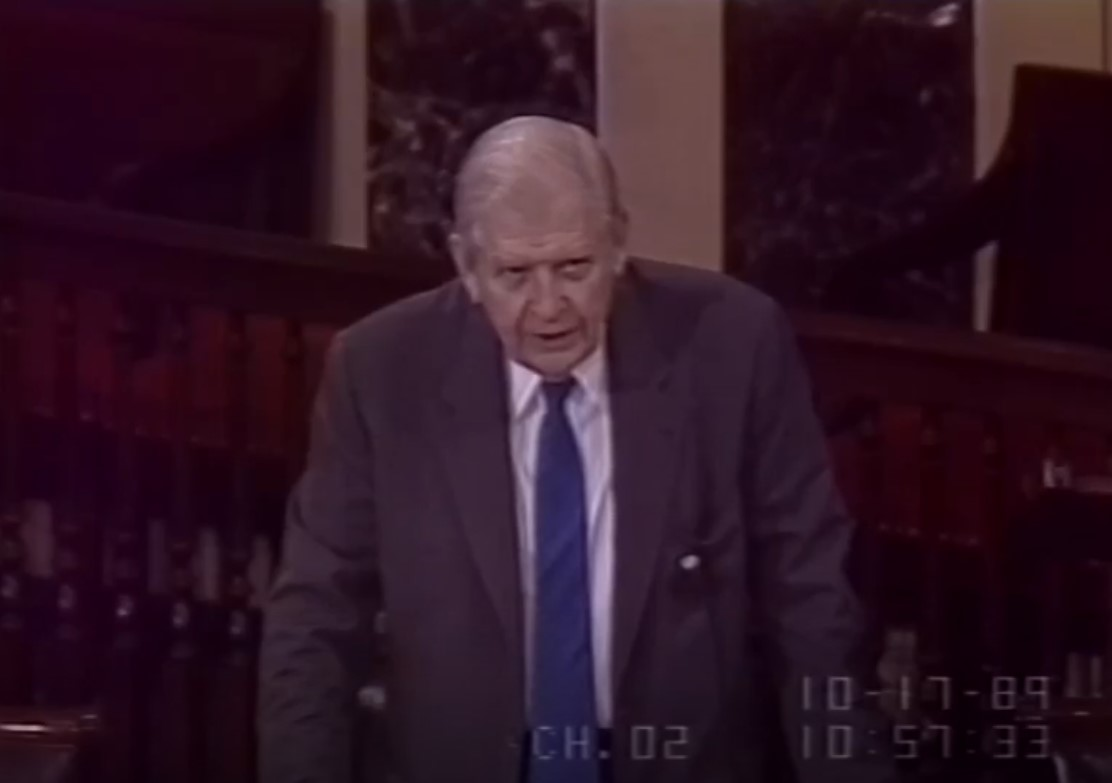
Sanford speaking to the U.S. Senate against the Flag Desecration Amendment on October 17, 1989

Sanford was initially hopeful that he could influence policy with the incoming Bush administration, but quickly tired of Bush, becoming outraged with his nomination of John Tower as Secretary of Defense and upset with—in his view—Bush's focus on trivial affairs meant to garner him short-term electoral support rather than provide long-term benefit to the country. Following the Supreme Court's decision to overturn the conviction of a man who had burned a United States Flag as an act of protest, Bush and congressional Republicans proposed a Flag Desecration Amendment to the United States Constitution that would make it illegal for a person to burn American flags. Sanford thought Bush was pursuing a "demagogic, vote-getting, low-principled course" and—though he personally disagreed with flag burning—he thought that such an amendment ran contrary to the ideals of political freedom included in the Bill of Rights. On October 17, 1989, Sanford delivered a speech in the Senate on the issue, saying that a prohibition of flag burning diminished the right to protest and weakened the Bill of Rights. He thought the speech was the best of his time in the Senate, and once he finished John Danforth, a cosponsor of the amendment, rose to say he had not thoughtfully considered the implications of the measure and would vote against it. The amendment ultimately failed to garner the necessary support of two-thirds of the body to pass.

By 1990, Sanford began having doubts about his future and about running for reelection. Reflecting on his past four years in the Senate, he wrote, "Its usefulness, its contribution to the nation and the state...was marginal." Sanford had a liberal voting record in comparison to his Democratic colleagues from the South, and it was consistently more liberal than that of any of his North Carolinian predecessors, being given an American Conservative Union rating of 12 percent.

Following Iraq's August Invasion of Kuwait, Bush moved military forces to the Persian Gulf region. Sanford preferred to impose sanctions against Iraq rather than pursue a military solution, saying to the Senate, "There is no reason for us to get involved in a shooting, killing war to take Kuwait." He became a leading opponent of American involvement in the ensuing Gulf War while at the same time growing more resolved to retire from the Senate. Several weeks later he became surprised to hear that Faircloth had switched his party registration to Republican and was preparing to challenge Sanford in the 1992 election for his Senate seat. His efforts to recruit his own successor candidate failed. In September, Sanford abruptly changed his mind and decided to run for reelection, saying, "I could find no decent way to be a lame duck."

=== 1992 campaign ===
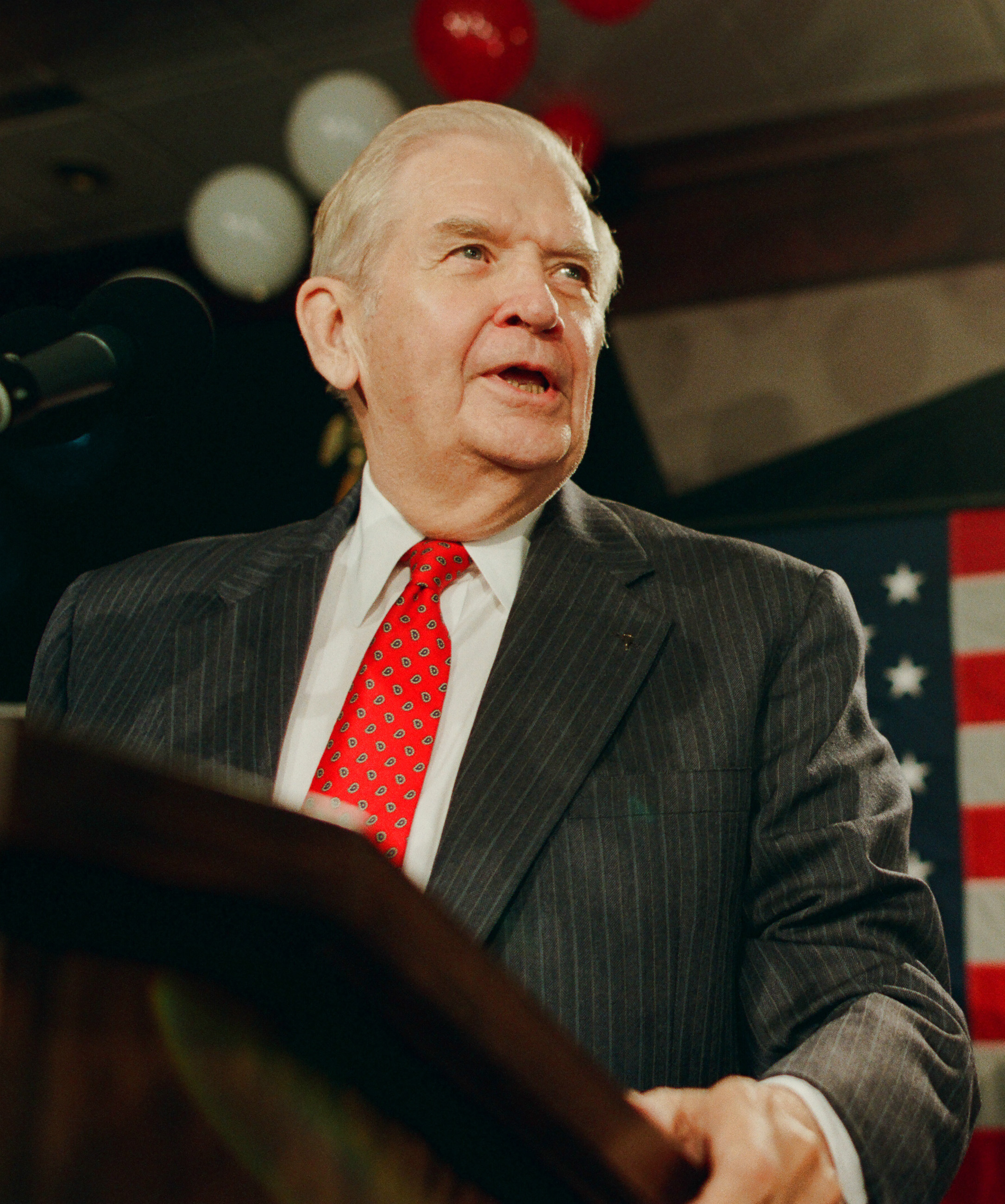
Sanford at the North Raleigh Hilton Hotel, November 3, 1992

Sanford officially announced his campaign for reelection on December 2, 1991. He faced no opposition in the Democratic primary, while Faircloth, enjoying substantial backing from Helms' National Congressional Club, won the Republican primary. Both men pledged to run issues-oriented campaigns and avoid personal attacks. In June 1992 he became afflicted with illness and was admitted to Duke Medical Center for treatment of a heart valve infection. This delayed his attempts to campaign, but he returned to work in the Senate in late July. Sanford was heavily involved in the direction of his campaign and pledged to tour all 100 North Carolina counties. Early polling suggested he enjoyed a large lead over Faircloth. Faircloth attacked Sanford as beholden to special interests and an advocate of big government and higher taxes. Sanford countered by portraying his opponent as a conservative hard-liner. During a televised debate in September Sanford countered Faircloth's accusations that he was a spendthrift by pointing to his efforts at budget reform.

By October Sanford's heart infection had grown more serious and he underwent surgery to replace the troubled valve, temporarily preventing him from campaigning. He was released from the hospital two weeks later, but he was noticeably thinner and the surgery had risen public doubts about his health. Without his leadership during the interim, his campaign lost initiative to Faircloth, who questioned his views on the Gulf War and characterized him as a Washington, D.C., insider. On November 3, 1992, Faircloth won the election by a 100,000-vote margin, though Democrat Bill Clinton won national election as United States President, while Jim Hunt was reelected Governor of North Carolina. Sanford celebrated the overall outcome at the North Raleigh Hilton Hotel, declaring, "This is a great night for the Democratic Party. We have the nation on the right track again. We have the state on the right track."

== Later life and death ==
Shortly after the Senate race, Sanford was hired by Duke University to teach a course on state government. In 1993 he formed a law firm with former South Carolina governor Robert Evander McNair, but he eventually withdrew and formed another firm with former North Carolina governor James Holshouser in Raleigh. Sanford also finished his last book, Outlive Your Enemies: Grow Old Gracefully, a narrative about aging and health, and began work on a novel about a journalist addressing major issues of the 20th century. He supported several business ventures and remained in contact with various politicians, including President Clinton.

In December 1997 Sanford went to Duke Medical Center after experiencing a low-grade fever for several days, fearing he had a heart infection. Doctors discovered cancer in his esophagus and liver and ruled that it was inoperable. He died on April 18, 1998, at his home. His funeral was held four days later at Duke Chapel, and it was attended by 17 U.S. Senators, four former governors, 100 members of the General Assembly, and the North Carolina Council of State. Soldiers from the 82nd Airborne Division acted as an honor guard. Sanford was entombed in the chapel's crypt.

== Legacy ==
Sanford was a very engaging extrovert...His vision in life was to help people. He had a huge ego. Of all the people I've known in politics, he had the strongest focus on government being there to make life better for the people. He was very optimistic.

— Willis Whichard

Sanford was one of the key figures of the New South, a historical era of social modernization in the region. Journalist John Drescher dubbed him "the first New South governor" while George Wallace called him "the symbol of the New South." Journalist Rob Christensen credited him with helping to "set a tone of moderation in North Carolina in the sixties". He is remembered in North Carolina as the "education governor"; historians and journalists have often cited Sanford's actions as governor as the source of North Carolina's historical policy focus on reforming education. In recognition of his efforts in education and in other areas, a 1981 Harvard University survey named him one of the 10 best governors of the 20th century. A study conducted by political scientist Larry Sabato concluded that Sanford was one of the best 12 governors to serve in the United States between 1950 and 1975. Historian William D. Goldsmith wrote, "Terry Sanford tested the limits of what a governor—or a politician period—could do in North Carolina of the early 1960s to advance human development without federal intervention." Journalist David Stout characterized Sanford as a "contradictory politician" and a man who "lack[ed] burning desire."

Political scientist Tom Eamon dubbed Sanford "North Carolina's most celebrated liberal politician". Sanford served as a role model to a number of Southern governors, including his protégé Jim Hunt of North Carolina, William Winter of Mississippi, and Bill Clinton of Arkansas. When Parris Glendening was campaigning to become Governor of Maryland in 1994, he promised voters that would model his administration after Sanford's. Upon Sanford's death Clinton—then serving as President of the United States—said, "His work and his influence literally changed the face and future of the South, making him one of the most influential Americans of the last 50 years." Senator John Edwards said that Sanford was his "political hero". Duke University renamed the institute in public policy the Sanford School of Public Policy. Fayetteville Senior High School was renamed Terry Sanford High School in his honor in 1968. The Terry Sanford Federal Building and Courthouse in Raleigh was named in honor of Sanford in 1999.

== General references ==
- Campbell, Karl E. (2017). "The Rise and Fall of the Progressive Plutocracy". In Tise, Larry E.; Crow, Jeffrey J. (eds.). New Voyages to Carolina: Reinterpreting North Carolina History. Chapel Hill: University of North Carolina Press. ISBN 978-1-4696-3460-9.
- Christensen, Rob (2010). The Paradox of Tar Heel Politics: The Personalities, Elections, and Events That Shaped Modern North Carolina (second ed.). Chapel Hill: The University of North Carolina Press. ISBN 978-0-8078-7151-5.
- Christensen, Rob (2019). The Rise and Fall of the Branchhead Boys: North Carolina's Scott Family and the Era of Progressive Politics. Chapel Hill: The University of North Carolina Press. ISBN 978-1-4696-5105-7.
- Cochrane, Augustus B. III (2001). Democracy Heading South: National Politics in the Shadow of Dixie. Lawrence: University Press of Kansas. ISBN 978-0-7006-1089-1.
- Cooper, Christopher A.; Knotts, H. Gibbs, eds. (2012). The New Politics of North Carolina. Chapel Hill: University of North Carolina Press. ISBN 978-1-4696-0658-3.
- Covington, Howard E. Jr; Ellis, Marion A. (1999). Terry Sanford: Politics, Progress, and Outrageous Ambitions. Durham: Duke University Press. ISBN 978-0-8223-2356-3.
- Davidson, Osha Gray (2007). The Best of Enemies: Race and Redemption in the New South. Chapel Hill: University of North Carolina Press. ISBN 978-0-8078-9977-9.
- Drescher, John (2000). Triumph of Good Will: How Terry Sanford Beat a Champion of Segregation in and Reshaped the South. Jackson: University Press of Mississippi. ISBN 1-57806-310-8. - read online, registration required
- Eamon, Tom (2014). The Making of a Southern Democracy: North Carolina Politics from Kerr Scott to Pat McCrory. Chapel Hill, North Carolina: University of North Carolina Press. ISBN 978-1-4696-0697-2. - Profile at Google Books
- Frederick, Jeff (2007). Stand Up for Alabama: Governor George Wallace. Tuscaloosa: University of Alabama Press. ISBN 978-0-8173-1574-0.
- Golden, Daniel (2009). The Price of Admission: How America's Ruling Class Buys Its Way into Elite Colleges—and Who Gets Left Outside the Gates (revised ed.). New York: Broadway Books. ISBN 978-0-307-49737-6.
- Goldsmith, William D. (2018). Educating for a New Economy: The Struggle to Redevelop a Jim Crow State, 1960–2000 (PDF) (PhD thesis). Duke University.
- Grimsley, Wayne (2003). James B. Hunt: A North Carolina Progressive. Jefferson: McFarland. ISBN 978-0-7864-1607-3.
- Hayes, Anna R. (2009). Without Precedent: The Life of Susie Marshall Sharp. Chapel Hill: University of North Carolina Press. ISBN 978-0-8078-8781-3.
- Holland, Max (2007). Lyndon B. Johnson, the Kennedy assassination and the transfer of power, November 1963 - January 1964. Vol. 4. New York: Norton. ISBN 978-0-393-06001-0.
- Fleer, Jack D. (1994). North Carolina Government & Politics. Lincoln: University of Nebraska Press. ISBN 978-0-8032-6885-2.
- Fleer, Jack (2007). Governors Speak. Lanham: University Press of America. ISBN 978-0-7618-3564-6.
- Korstad, Robert Rogers; Leloudis, James L. (2010). To right these wrongs: the North Carolina Fund and the battle to end poverty and inequality in 1960s America. Chapel Hill: University of North Carolina Press. ISBN 978-0-8078-7114-0.
- Link, William A. (2018). North Carolina: Change and Tradition in a Southern State (second ed.). Hoboken, New Jersey: John Wiley & Sons, Inc. ISBN 978-1-118-83360-5.
- Rogoff, Leonard (2010). Down Home: Jewish Life in North Carolina. Chapel Hill: University of North Carolina Press. ISBN 978-0-8078-9599-3.
- Savage, Sean J. (2004). JFK, LBJ, and the Democratic Party. SUNY series in the presidency (illustrated ed.). Albany: SUNY Press. ISBN 978-0-7914-6169-3.
- Silver, Timothy (2003). Mount Mitchell and the Black Mountains: An Environmental History of the Highest Peaks in Eastern America. Chapel Hill: University of North Carolina Press. ISBN 978-0-8078-6314-5.
- Walker, Anders (2009). The Ghost of Jim Crow: How Southern Moderates Used Brown v. Board of Education to Stall Civil Rights. New York: Oxford University Press. ISBN 978-0-19-972046-0.
- Winford, Brandon K. (2019). John Hervey Wheeler, Black Banking, and the Economic Struggle for Civil Rights. Lexington: University Press of Kentucky. ISBN 978-0-8131-7827-1.

Party political offices
Preceded by Luther H. Hodges	Democratic nominee for Governor of North Carolina; 1960	Succeeded by Dan K. Moore
Preceded by Robert Burren Morgan	Democratic nominee for U.S. Senator from North Carolina (Class 3); 1986, 1992	Succeeded by John Edwards
Political offices
Preceded by Luther H. Hodges	Governor of North Carolina; 1961–1965	Succeeded by Dan K. Moore
U.S. Senate
Preceded by Jim Broyhill	U.S. Senator (Class 2) from North Carolina; 1986–1993; Served alongside: Jesse Helms	Succeeded by Lauch Faircloth
Preceded by Howell Heflin	Chair of the Senate Ethics Committee; 1992–1993	Succeeded by Richard Bryan
Academic offices
Preceded by Douglas Knight	President of Duke University; 1969–1985	Succeeded by H. Keith H. Brodie
