= 1960 North Carolina gubernatorial election =

- November 8, 1960
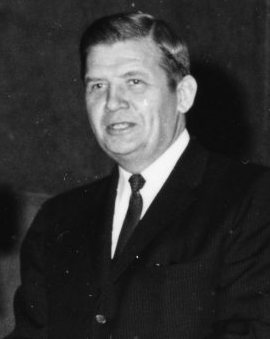

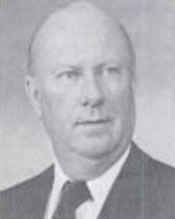
Nominee	Terry Sanford	Robert L. Gavin
Party	Democratic	Republican
Popular vote	735,248	613,975
Percentage	54.45%	45.47%
- County results Sanford: 50–60% 60–70% 70–80% 80–90% >90% Gavin: 50–60% 60–70% 70–80%
Governor before election
Luther H. Hodges
Democratic
Elected Governor
Terry Sanford
Democratic

The 1960 North Carolina gubernatorial election was held on November 8, 1960. Democratic nominee Terry Sanford defeated Republican nominee Robert L. Gavin with 54.45% of the vote.

== Background ==
By 1960, many of North Carolina's leading Democratic politicians from the previous two decades were dead. The incumbent governor, Luther H. Hodges did not have a strong political organization and was retiring from politics.

== Primary elections ==
Primary elections were held on May 28, 1960.

=== Democratic primary ===
==== Candidates ====
- Terry Sanford, former State Senator
- I. Beverly Lake Sr., attorney
- Malcolm B. Seawell, North Carolina Attorney General
- John Davis Larkins Jr., former State Senator

John Davis Larkins Jr. was the first Democrat to declare his candidacy, announcing his bid on January 20, 1960. 25.8% of the voting age population participated in the Democratic primary.

==== Results ====
Democratic primary results
Party	Candidate	Votes	%
Democratic	Terry Sanford	269,463	41.26
Democratic	I. Beverly Lake Sr.	181,692	27.82
Democratic	Malcolm B. Seawell	101,148	15.49
Democratic	John Davis Larkins Jr.	100,757	15.43
Total votes		653,060	100.00

Democratic primary runoff results
Party	Candidate	Votes	%
Democratic	Terry Sanford	352,133	56.07
Democratic	I. Beverly Lake Sr.	275,905	43.93
Total votes		628,038	100.00

== General election ==
=== Candidates ===
- Terry Sanford, Democratic
- Robert L. Gavin, Republican

=== Results ===
1960 North Carolina gubernatorial election
Party	Candidate	Votes	%	±%
Democratic	Terry Sanford	735,248	54.45%	
Republican	Robert L. Gavin	613,975	45.47%	
Majority		121,273		
Turnout		1,350,360		
Democratic hold		Swing		

== Works cited ==
- Drescher, John (2000). Triumph of Good Will: How Terry Sanford Beat a Champion of Segregation in and Reshaped the South. Jackson, Mississippi: University Press of Mississippi. ISBN 1-57806-310-8. - Read online, registration required
- Steed, Robert; Moreland, Laurence; Baker, Tod, eds. (1980). Party Politics in the South. Praeger Publishers. ISBN 0030565863.
