= 1964 North Carolina gubernatorial election =

- November 3, 1964
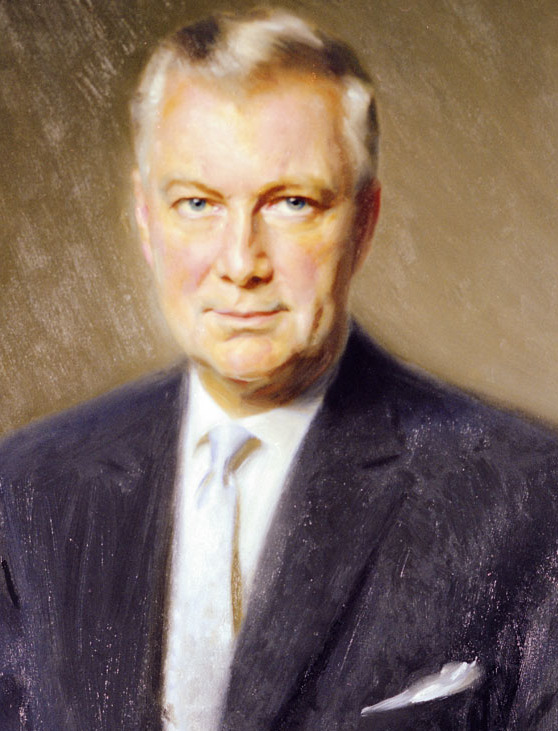

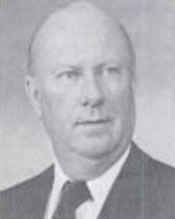
Nominee	Dan K. Moore	Robert L. Gavin
Party	Democratic	Republican
Popular vote	790,343	606,165
Percentage	56.59%	43.41%
- County results Moore: 50–60% 60–70% 70–80% 80–90% Gavin: 50–60% 60–70%
Governor before election
Terry Sanford
Democratic
Elected Governor
Dan K. Moore
Democratic

The 1964 North Carolina gubernatorial election was held on November 3, 1964. Democratic nominee Dan K. Moore defeated Republican nominee Robert L. Gavin with 56.59% of the vote.

== Primary elections ==
Primary elections were held on May 30, 1964.

=== Democratic primary ===
==== Candidates ====
- Dan K. Moore, former Judge of the North Carolina Superior Court
- L. Richardson Preyer, former Judge of the United States District Court for the Middle District of North Carolina
- I. Beverly Lake Sr., attorney
- Kidd Brewer, businessman and former Appalachian State Mountaineers football coach
- Bruce E. Burleson
- Raymond J. Stansbury

28.7% of the voting age population participated in the Democratic primary.

==== Results ====
Democratic primary results
Party	Candidate	Votes	%
Democratic	L. Richardson Preyer	281,430	36.59
Democratic	Dan K. Moore	257,872	33.53
Democratic	I. Beverly Lake Sr.	217,172	28.24
Democratic	Kidd Brewer	8,026	1.04
Democratic	Bruce E. Burleson	2,445	0.32
Democratic	Raymond J. Stansbury	2,145	0.28
Total votes		769,090	100.00

Democratic primary runoff results
Party	Candidate	Votes	%
Democratic	Dan K. Moore	480,431	62.05
Democratic	L. Richardson Preyer	293,863	37.95
Total votes		774,294	100.00

=== Republican primary ===
==== Candidates ====
- Robert L. Gavin, former United States Attorney for the Middle District of North Carolina
- Charles W. Strong, State Senator
- Donald Badgley, State Representative

2.3% of the voting age population participated in the Republican primary.

==== Results ====
Republican primary results
Party	Candidate	Votes	%
Republican	Robert L. Gavin	53,145	83.28
Republican	Charles W. Strong	8,652	13.56
Republican	Donald Badgley	2,018	3.16
Total votes		63,815	100.00

== General election ==
=== Candidates ===
- Dan K. Moore, Democratic
- Robert L. Gavin, Republican

=== Results ===
1964 North Carolina gubernatorial election
Party	Candidate	Votes	%	±%
Democratic	Dan K. Moore	790,343	56.59	
Republican	Robert L. Gavin	606,165	43.41	
Majority		184,178		
Turnout		1,396,508		
Democratic hold		Swing		

== Works cited ==
- Steed, Robert; Moreland, Laurence; Baker, Tod, eds. (1980). Party Politics in the South. Praeger Publishers. ISBN 0030565863.
