= International Commission for Central American Recovery and Development =

1987 commission on Central American recovery and development

Cover of Poverty, Conflict, and Hope

The International Commission for Central American Recovery and Development (ICCARD) was an international commission convened at Duke University in 1987 to examine recovery, development, peace and democratisation in Central America. Its report, Poverty, Conflict, and Hope: A Turning Point in Central America, was published by Duke University Press in 1989. The commission was also known as the Sanford Commission, after former North Carolina governor and United States senator Terry Sanford, who helped catalyse its work. The Ford Foundation's 1988 annual report described the commission as a group of 33 scholars and leaders from Central America, the Caribbean, Latin America, North America and Europe. Duke University Press material for the report described the project as drawing on the work of 45 international experts.

== Report ==
Poverty, Conflict, and Hope argued that Central America's crisis of the 1970s and 1980s had economic, social and political roots, including exclusionary politics, unequal development, weakened regional trade and external economic pressures. The report set out recommendations for recovery that linked poverty reduction, employment, human-resource development, fiscal and monetary reform, natural-resource conservation and democratic institution-building. The commission treated democracy and development as interdependent. It emphasised civilian rule, respect for human rights, broad participation by civil society, and stronger regional co-operation.

== Reception and later context ==
The report was released shortly before a meeting of Central American presidents during the Central American peace process. Revista Envío reported in April 1989 that the European Economic Community welcomed the initiative and linked it to wider diplomatic efforts around regional peace and development. Clarence Zuvekas later discussed the commission's report in a review essay on Central American economic recovery and development, treating it as one of several attempts to frame post-conflict reconstruction and regional reform.

== See also ==
- Central America
- International development
- Esquipulas Peace Agreement
