= Dan K. Moore =

American judge

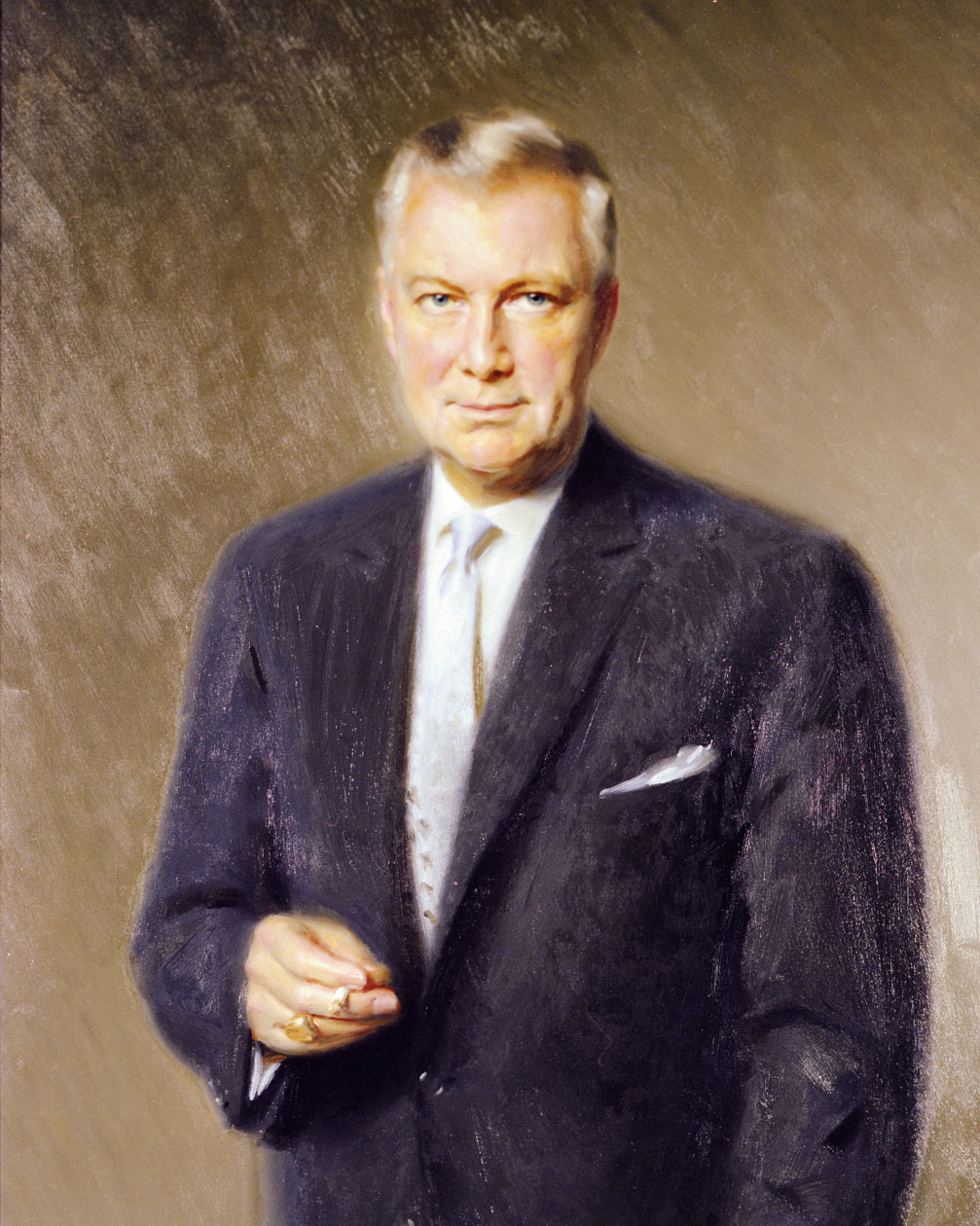

66th Governor of North Carolina
- In office January 8, 1965 – January 3, 1969
- Lieutenant: Robert W. Scott
- Preceded by: Terry Sanford
- Succeeded by: Robert W. Scott

Member of the North Carolina House of Representatives from Jackson County
- In office 1941–1943
- Preceded by: Daniel Dean Tompkins
- Succeeded by: Daniel Dean Tompkins

Personal details
- Born: Daniel Killian Moore; April 2, 1906 Asheville, North Carolina, U.S.
- Died: September 7, 1986 (aged 80) Durham, North Carolina, U.S.
- Resting place: Oakwood Cemetery, Raleigh, North Carolina
- Party: Democratic
- Spouse: Jeanelle Coulter (m. 1933)
- Children: 2
- Education: University of North Carolina at Chapel Hill
- Profession: Lawyer, politician

Military service
- Allegiance: United States
- Branch/service: United States Army
- Years of service: 1943–1945
- Battles/wars: World War II

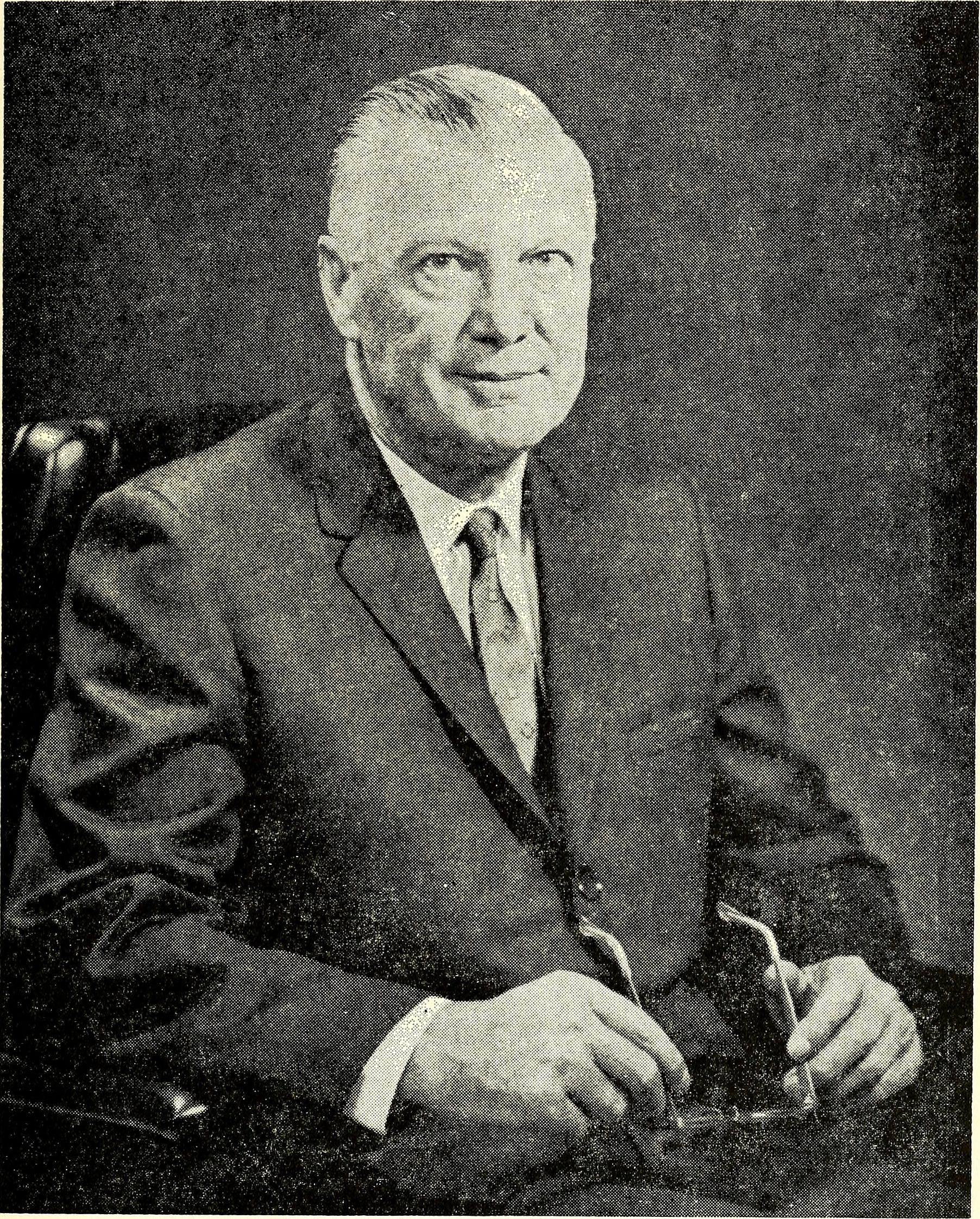
Dan Killian Moore

Daniel Killian Moore (April 2, 1906 – September 7, 1986) was the 66th governor of the state of North Carolina from 1965 to 1969.

== Life and career ==
Daniel Killian Moore was born in Asheville, North Carolina, on April 2, 1906 to Fred Moore and Lela Enloe. His father was a superior court judge. Upon his death two years after Dan's birth, the family moved to Jackson County.

Moore earned a bachelor's degree in commerce in 1927 from the University of North Carolina at Chapel Hill and a law degree in 1929 from the University of North Carolina School of Law where he was a member of the Pi Kappa Phi fraternity and was selected to Phi Beta Kappa. He practiced law in Sylva, North Carolina and served a term in the North Carolina House of Representatives in 1941 before entering the U.S. Army in 1943 during World War II. While in the army, he served in the medical and judge advocate departments, with 13 months of service in Europe. He was discharged in October 1945 as an enlisted soldier. After the war, Moore served as a North Carolina Superior Court judge from 1948 to 1958. Subsequently, Moore served as counsel for the Champion Papers company in Canton, North Carolina, while also serving on the state Board of Water Resources. He left Champion to run for Governor in 1964. He was seen as the moderate in the Democratic primary, between the conservative I. Beverly Lake Sr. and the more progressive L. Richardson Preyer. Moore won a primary runoff with Preyer. He was sworn in on January 8, 1965.

During Moore’s time as governor, various reforms were carried out in areas such as education, agriculture, healthcare, and highway safety.

After serving one term as governor (North Carolina governors were not then eligible to be re-elected), Moore's successor, Governor Robert W. Scott, appointed him to the North Carolina Supreme Court, the first governor of North Carolina to be so honored. He served on the Court from November 20, 1969 until December 31, 1978. As a judge and justice, he was noted for the breadth of his legal experience, common sense, and compassion.

At the 1968 Democratic National Convention Moore received 17½ votes for president on the first ballot, finishing fifth behind Vice President Hubert Humphrey (1,760½), Senator Eugene McCarthy (601), Sen. George McGovern (146½), and Rev. Channing E. Phillips (67½). Moore received 12 of North Carolina's 59 votes, 3 from Virginia, 2 from Georgia and ½ vote from Alabama.

In May 1986, the last year of his life, Moore had a section of Interstate 40 named after him. (citation in next section)

== Death and memorial ==
Moore died Sunday, September 7, 1986 at the age of 80 at Duke Medical Center in Durham (now known as a part of Duke University Hospital) Hospital officials and family members declined to give the cause of death but it is known that he had cancer and had been undergoing chemotherapy at Duke Medical Center prior to his death. Moore was admitted to Duke Medical on August 30 and remained there until his death at 2:10 pm. The Funeral was at Edenton Street United Methodist Church in Raleigh and he was buried in Historic Oakwood Cemetery in Raleigh, North Carolina.

Some statements made by friends and family include one from governor at the time James G. Martin in which he stated "The passing of Dan K. Moore is a sad loss to North Carolina. Mrs. Martin and I have lost a good friend. He and his dear wife, Jeanelle, have been an inspirational example to us in so many ways. His firm and steady leadership and his many years of service as governor and judge have been a blessing to the people of the state. We will miss him". Former governor Jim Hunt said: "His accomplishments in judicial excellence, economic development and programs for youth are of a poorer state with the passing of this decent and civilized leader." Susie Sharp, the chief justice when Moore served as a Supreme Court Justice stated "He is one of the finest people I ever knew- Dan was a very steady person. You couldn't stampede him. That was even so in law school". Former governor James Holshouser said: "Not only did he do an able job as governor, but he was an honest, decent human being. I think his service to the state was exemplary." Holshouser goes on to state that after Governor Sanford, Moore's leadership methods were "very welcome at that time".

The family of Moore requested that in lieu of flowers, memorial contributions be made in his name as a Scholarship to The University of North Carolina School of Law (see Dan K. Moore program in Ethics)

On April 1, 2017, a North Carolina historical marker was dedicated at Mark Watson Park, in Sylva, North Carolina, in recognition of Moore's significant impact on the state's judicial system. The marker was unveiled by his children, Edith Moore Hamilton and Daniel Killian Moore Jr.

Representative David McKee Hall was a nephew of Governor Moore. Portraits of the two men hang today in the Jackson County Library in Sylva.

== Works cited ==
- Cheney, John L. Jr., ed. (1981). North Carolina Government, 1585-1979 : A Narrative and Statistical History (revised ed.). Raleigh: North Carolina Secretary of State. OCLC 1290270510.

North Carolina House of Representatives
Preceded by Daniel Dean Tompkins	Member of the North Carolina House of Representatives from Jackson County; 1941–1943	Succeeded by Daniel Dean Tompkins
Party political offices
Preceded by Terry Sanford	Democratic nominee for Governor of North Carolina; 1964	Succeeded by Robert W. Scott
Political offices
Preceded by Terry Sanford	Governor of North Carolina; January 8, 1965– January 3, 1969	Succeeded by Robert W. Scott
