= Triumph of Good Will =

Triumph of Good Will: How Terry Sanford Beat a Champion of Segregation and Reshaped the South
- First edition cover
- Author: John Drescher
- Language: English
- Publisher: University Press of Mississippi
- Publication date: 2000
- ISBN: 1-57806-310-8 (first edition)
- Dewey Decimal: 975.6043092
- LC Class: F260 .D74

Triumph of Good Will: How Terry Sanford Beat a Champion of Segregation and Reshaped the South is a non-fiction book by John Drescher, published in 2000 by University Press of Mississippi.

The book detailed Terry Sanford's strategies to be elected as Governor of North Carolina and his governance style, which was characterized as politically moderate, influencing Jimmy Carter and Bill Clinton in their political careers.

== Reception ==
Kari Frederickson of the University of Alabama wrote that the book was made "colorfully" and cited the "eye for detail and gift for narrative drama". She added that it is "generally a pleasurable read." She did state that the citation system may be disliked by academics.

Glen Jeansonne of the University of Wisconsin stated that Drescher chooses not to engage in hyperbole nor have any "rhetorical flourishes", while also not "being dull or derivative"; Jeansonne characterizes the book as using a "restrained style".

Julian M. Pleasants of the University of Florida praised the "engaging writing style" and concluded that the work "is a balanced, valuable study".

== See also ==
- 1960 North Carolina gubernatorial election
