= 1972 North Carolina gubernatorial election =

- November 7, 1972
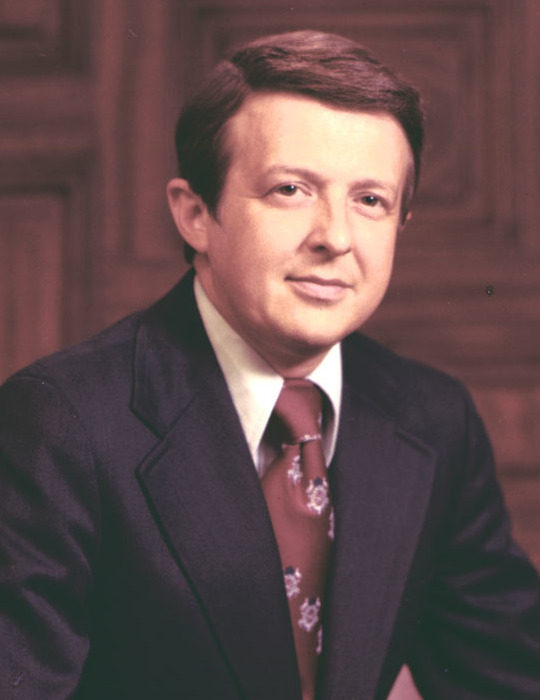

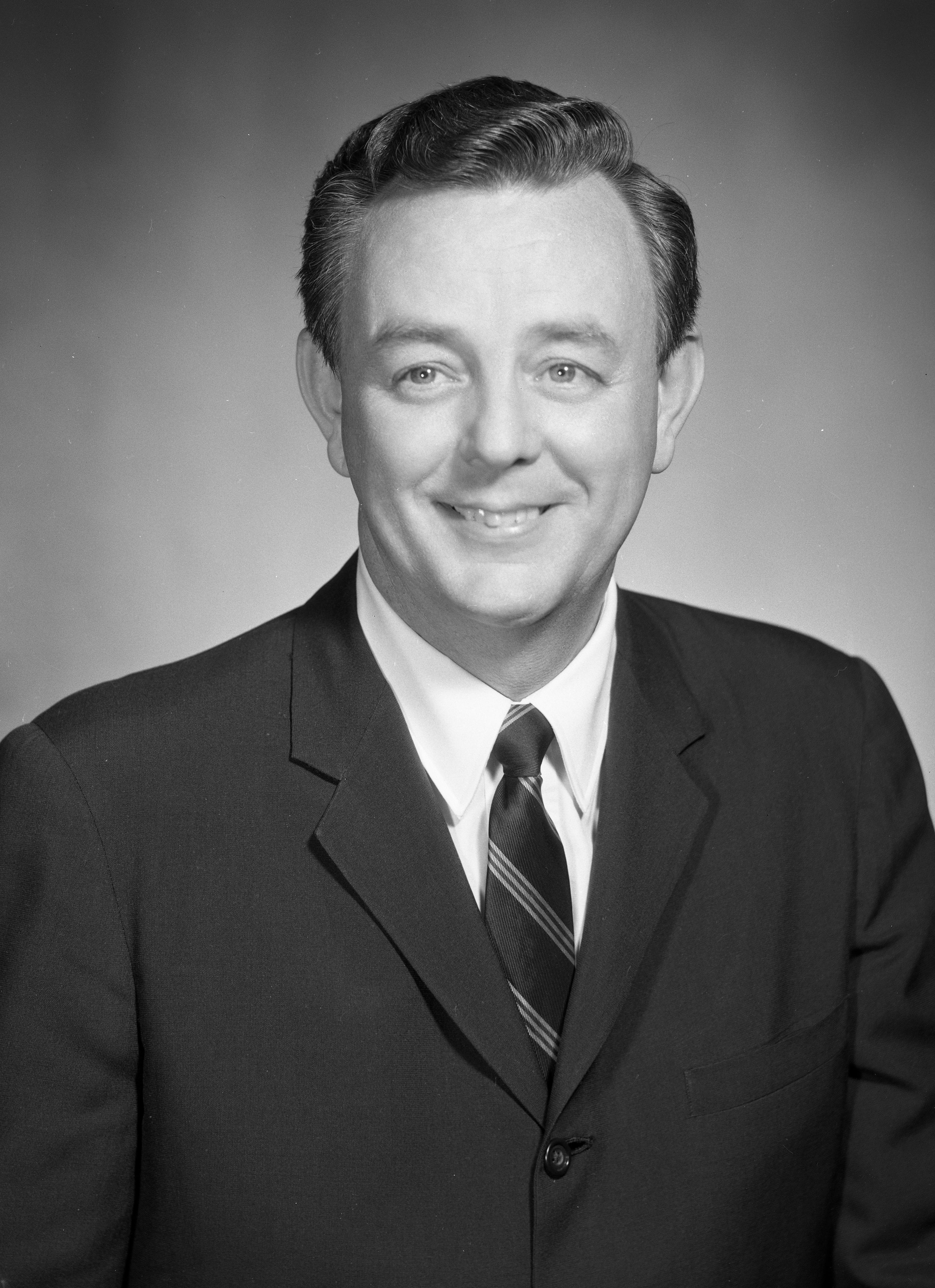
Nominee	James Holshouser	Skipper Bowles
Party	Republican	Democratic
Popular vote	767,470	729,104
Percentage	51.00%	48.45%
- County results Holshouser: 50–60% 60–70% 70–80% 80–90% Bowles: 40–50% 50–60% 60–70% 70–80% 80–90%
Governor before election
Robert W. Scott
Democratic
Elected Governor
James Holshouser
Republican

The 1972 North Carolina gubernatorial election was held on November 7, 1972. Republican nominee James Holshouser defeated Democratic nominee Skipper Bowles with 51% of the vote. Holshouser thus became the first Republican elected governor of the state since 1896.

This election was also the first time in a century (since the 1872 election) that a Republican candidate won an outright majority of the vote.

== Primary elections ==
Primary elections were held on May 6, 1972.

=== Democratic primary ===
==== Candidates ====
- Skipper Bowles, state senator
- Zeb V.K. Dickson
- Reginald A. Hawkins, civil rights activist and dentist
- Wilbur Hobby, labor union leader
- C. Eugene Leggett
- Hoyt Patrick Taylor Jr., incumbent lieutenant governor

22.8% of the voting-age population participated in the Democratic primary.

==== Results ====
Democratic primary results
Party	Candidate	Votes	%
Democratic	Skipper Bowles	367,433	45.47
Democratic	Hoyt Patrick Taylor Jr.	304,910	37.73
Democratic	Reginald A. Hawkins	65,950	8.16
Democratic	Wilbur Hobby	58,990	7.30
Democratic	C. Eugene Leggett	6,352	0.79
Democratic	Zeb V.K. Dickson	4,470	0.55
Total votes		808,105	100.00

Democratic primary runoff results
Party	Candidate	Votes	%
Democratic	Skipper Bowles	336,034	54.34
Democratic	Hoyt Patrick Taylor Jr.	282,345	45.66
Total votes		618,379	100.00

=== Republican primary ===
==== Candidates ====
- Thomas E. Chappell
- Jim Gardner, former U.S. representative
- Leroy Gibson
- James Holshouser, state representative

4.9% of the voting-age population participated in the Republican primary.

==== Results ====
Republican primary results
Party	Candidate	Votes	%
Republican	Jim Gardner	84,906	49.77
Republican	James Holshouser	83,637	49.03
Republican	Leroy Gibson	1,083	0.64
Republican	Thomas E. Chappell	957	0.56
Total votes		170,583	100.00

Republican primary runoff results
Party	Candidate	Votes	%
Republican	James Holshouser	69,916	50.65
Republican	Jim Gardner	68,134	49.36
Total votes		138,050	100.00

== General election ==
=== Candidates ===
Major party candidates

- Skipper Bowles, Democratic
- James Holshouser, Republican

Other candidates

- Arlis F. Pettyjohn, American

=== Results ===
1972 North Carolina gubernatorial election
Party	Candidate	Votes	%	±%
Republican	James Holshouser	767,470	51.00%	
Democratic	Skipper Bowles	729,104	48.45%	
American	Arlis F. Pettyjohn	8,211	0.55%	
Majority		38,366		
Turnout		1,504,785		
Republican gain from Democratic		Swing		

== Works cited ==
- Steed, Robert; Moreland, Laurence; Baker, Tod, eds. (1980). Party Politics in the South. Praeger Publishers. ISBN 0030565863.
