= Garren (disambiguation) =

Garren is an American hairstylist.

Garren may also refer to:

== People ==
- Garren Stitt (born 2003), American actor and singer
- Don Garren (1933–2018), American politician from North Carolina
- Zachary Garren, American guitarist formerly of Dance Gavin Dance and now a member of Strawberry Girls

== Geography ==
- Garren Brook, a river in England
- Garrensee, a lake in Germany
- NGC 604, also known as the Garren Nebula
