= Skipper Bowles =

American politician (1919–1986)

Hargrove Bowles Jr.
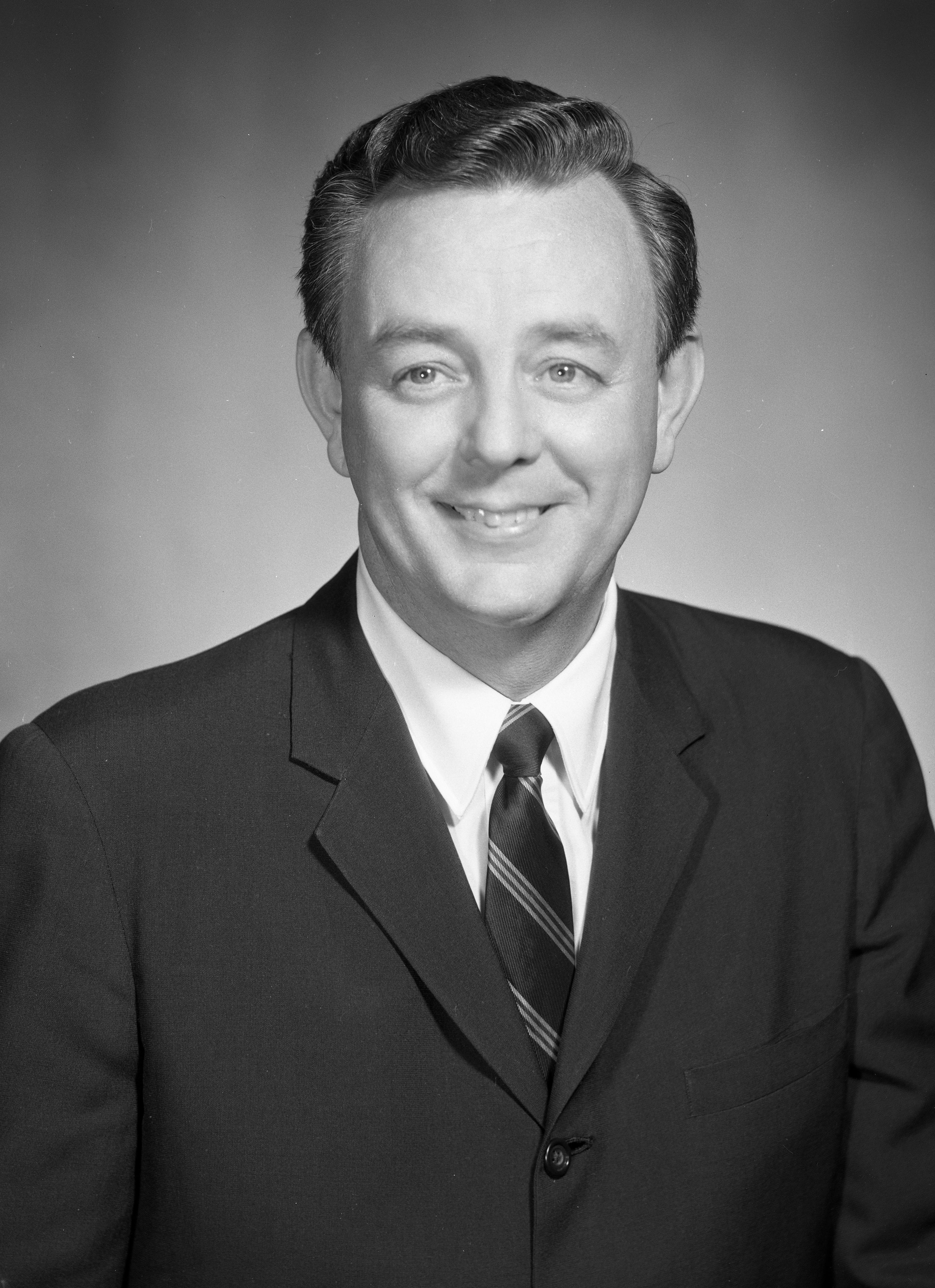
- Bowles circa 1967

Director of the North Carolina Department of Conservation and Development
- In office January 9, 1961 – August 2, 1962
- Governor: Terry Sanford

Chairman of the Board of the North Carolina Department of Conservation and Development
- In office August 2, 1962 – June 30, 1965

Personal details
- Born: November 16, 1919 Monroe, North Carolina, United States
- Died: September 7, 1986 (aged 66) Greensboro, North Carolina
- Party: Democratic
- Children: Erskine Bowles

Military service
- Allegiance: United States
- Branch/service: United States Army
- Years of service: 1943–1945

Hargrove "Skipper" Bowles Jr. (November 16, 1919 – September 7, 1986) was an American Democratic politician and businessman, based in Greensboro, North Carolina.

== Early life ==
Hargrove Bowles Jr. was born on November 16, 1919, in Monroe, North Carolina. His father was a banker. When the bank he managed closed during the Great Depression, the Bowles family moved to Greensboro. Hargrove completed high school in Monroe, earning the nickname "Skipper" while he managed the school's football team. While in Monroe he befriended future politician Jesse Helms.

Bowles enrolled at the University of North Carolina at Chapel Hill in the 1937 fall semester and briefly lived as a roommate of Terry Sanford. While a student he worked in a dining hall before becoming a manager of a clothing store in downtown Chapel Hill. Bowles also led a dance band in which he played the trumpet, was on the university's honor council, and was a staff member of the student humor magazine, The Buccaneer. Involved in student politics, he was class president during his sophomore year. He left the university one semester before getting a degree to attend a school on insurance run by the Hartford Accident & Indemnity Company in Hartford, Connecticut. In 1941 he returned to Greensboro and married Jessamine Boyce. He had four children with her. He served in the United States Army from 1943 to 1945, being discharged at the rank of corporal.

== Business career ==
Following his marriage, Bowles joined the management staff of wholesale grocer Thomas & Howard, where his father-in-law was president. Working his way up through the company, he was its vice president from 1948 to 1952 before being elevated to the presidency upon his father-in-law's death. He sold his interest in the company in 1958.

In 1956 Bowles started the Bowles Realty and Insurance Company. In 1965 he became chairman of an investment bank.

== Political career ==
=== North Carolina Department of Conservation and Development ===
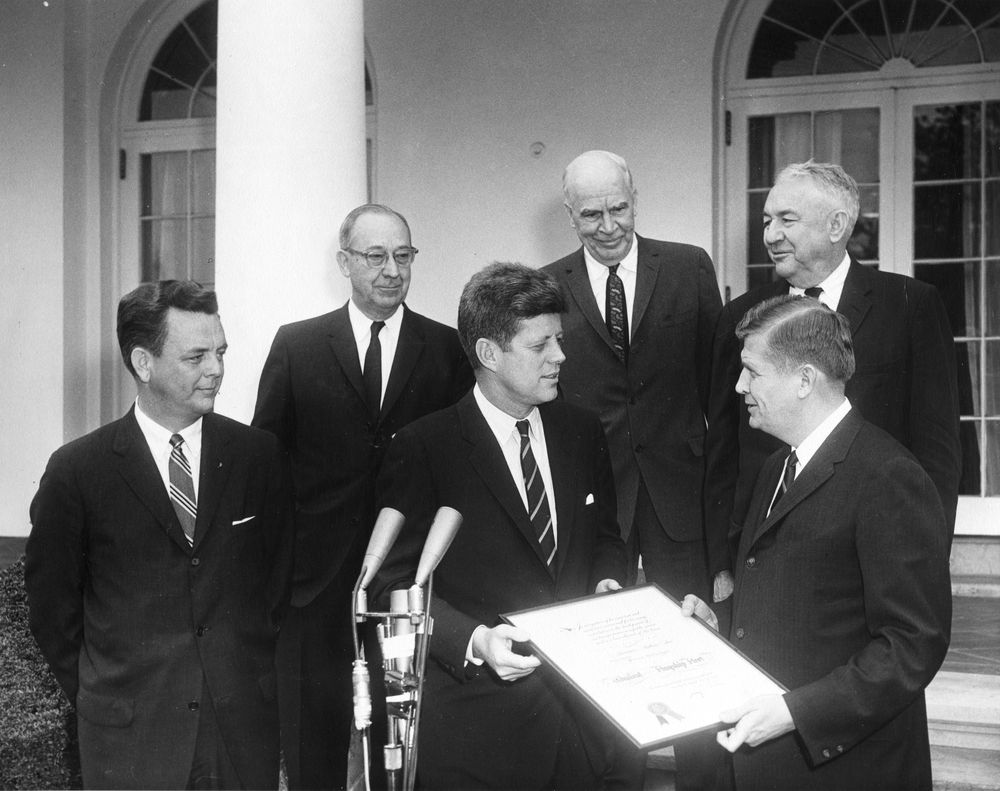
Bowles (far left) with other North Carolina politicians at the White House in 1961

Bowles was finance director for Terry Sanford's gubernatorial campaign in 1960. In January 1961, Sanford, who had been elected governor of North Carolina, appointed Bowles director of the Department of Conservation and Development. He was sworn in on January 9. In that capacity he actively worked to recruit new industries and brought corporate executives on tours in North Carolina to convince them to invest in the state. In the summer of 1961, Sanford and Bowles jointly decided to racially integrate North Carolina's state parks. In 1962, Bowles promulgated an official policy desegregating park facilities.

That summer Bowles resigned from the directorate of the Department of Conservation and Development to free up more of his time to devote to his businesses. Sanford in turn designated him as chairman of the department's policy-making board of directors; Bowles switched jobs on August 2. Sanford later placed him on the board of directors of the North Carolina Fund. Though Sanford finished his term with a high rate of unpopularity, Bowles remained a staunch ally and defender of his administration. Bowles left the department chairmanship on June 30, 1965.

=== Legislative career ===
In November 1966 Bowles ran for as one of seven candidates for six seats in the North Carolina House of Representatives for Guilford County. He placed fourth with 22,670 votes and secured one of the seats. Bowles was later elected to two terms in the North Carolina Senate. He was sworn-in to the body on January 15, 1969.

=== 1972 gubernatorial election ===
Bowles long aspired to be elected governor of North Carolina. In 1972, he declared himself a candidate in the Democratic primary for the gubernatorial race. Fashioning himself as a progressive centrist, he emphasized his support for expanding the state's community college system and technical education opportunities to strengthen the economy while opposing tax increases. He was opposed in his bid by Lieutenant Governor Hoyt Patrick Taylor Jr.—the early favorite of Democratic leaders, black dentist Reginald Hawkins, and labor unionist Wilbur Hobby.

Bowles inherited much of Sanford's old coalition and anticipated receiving strong backing from residents of Guilford County. Wealthy and an active alumnus of UNC, he had personal financial resources he could devote to his campaign and was familiar with many state business leaders. He distanced himself from incumbent Democratic governor Robert W. Scott, who had cultivated several political enemies. While traditional campaigns involving stump speeches and newspaper advertising were still the norm in the state at the time, Bowles used newer techniques to reach voters, placing an emphasis on television commercials. Aided by consultant Walter DeVries, his campaign used focus groups and survey research to gauge issues which mattered most to the electorate. Mindful of their value in a primary runoff scenario, he also quietly pursued the good faith of black voters. Bowles led in the May primary with 367,433 votes with strong performance in all of the state's regions and major metropolitan areas. Taylor finished second with 309,919.

Taylor called for a primary runoff. The campaign became increasingly bitter, with most Sanford supporters backing Bowles and the majority of Scott supporters working for Taylor. Bowles won the Democratic primary runoff in June with 336,035 votes to Taylor's 282,345. Moves towards unifying the party behind the nominee were complicated by lingering bitterness harbored by Scott and Taylor supporters. Bowles joked that after he won the governorship his allies would "get the white meat" while the backers of other primary candidates would "get the dark meat", angering Taylor supporters.

He lost the general election to Republican James Holshouser, leading in much of eastern North Carolina but losing the west, the piedmont, and several metropolitan areas. He was the first Democratic nominee to lose a North Carolina gubernatorial race in the 20th century. Many Democratic leaders blamed Bowles' loss on his failure to unify his party.

Bowles remained optimistic about running again in 1976. In 1975 he mass mailed out a circular calling for help in an anticipated campaign. Lieutenant Governor Jim Hunt, set on launching his own campaign for the Democratic nomination, quickly moved to secure commitments from Bowles' former supporters. He also attempted to unseat State Democratic Party Chairman James Sugg, a key Bowles supporter. On March 25, 1976, Bowels declared that he would not run, citing cardiovascular trouble. He later endorsed former state senator George Wood in the primary.

== Later life ==
Bowles later became known for his service to and fundraising for the University of North Carolina at Chapel Hill, from which he graduated in 1941. UNC's Center for Alcohol Studies is named for him.

Bowles died on September 7, 1986, at his home in Greensboro from complications of Lou Gehrig's disease. His son, Erskine Bowles, followed his father both into the investment banking business and into politics.

== Works cited ==
- Bass, Jack (1995). The Transformation of Southern Politics: Social Change and Political Consequence Since 1945 (reprint ed.). University of Georgia Press. ISBN 9780820317281.
- Covington, Howard E. Jr; Ellis, Marion A. (1999). Terry Sanford: Politics, Progress, and Outrageous Ambitions. Durham: Duke University Press. ISBN 9780822323563.
- Covington, Howard E.; Ellis, Marion A., eds. (2002). The North Carolina Century: Tar Heels who Made a Difference, 1900–2000. Levine Museum of the New South. ISBN 9780807827574.
- Eamon, Tom (2014). The Making of a Southern Democracy: North Carolina Politics from Kerr Scott to Pat McCrory. Chapel Hill: University of North Carolina Press. ISBN 9781469606972. - See profile at Google Books
- Grimsley, Wayne (2003). James B. Hunt: A North Carolina Progressive. McFarland. ISBN 9780786416073.
- Korstad, Robert Rogers; Leloudis, James L. (2010). To right these wrongs: the North Carolina Fund and the battle to end poverty and inequality in 1960s America. Chapel Hill: University of North Carolina Press. ISBN 9780807871140.
- North Carolina Manual. Raleigh: North Carolina Secretary of State. 1969. OCLC 436873840.
- Silver, Timothy (2003). Mount Mitchell and the Black Mountains: An Environmental History of the Highest Peaks in Eastern America. Chapel Hill: University of North Carolina Press. ISBN 9780807863145.

Party political offices
Preceded by Robert W. Scott	Democratic nominee for Governor of North Carolina; 1972	Succeeded by Jim Hunt
