= Ponder machine =

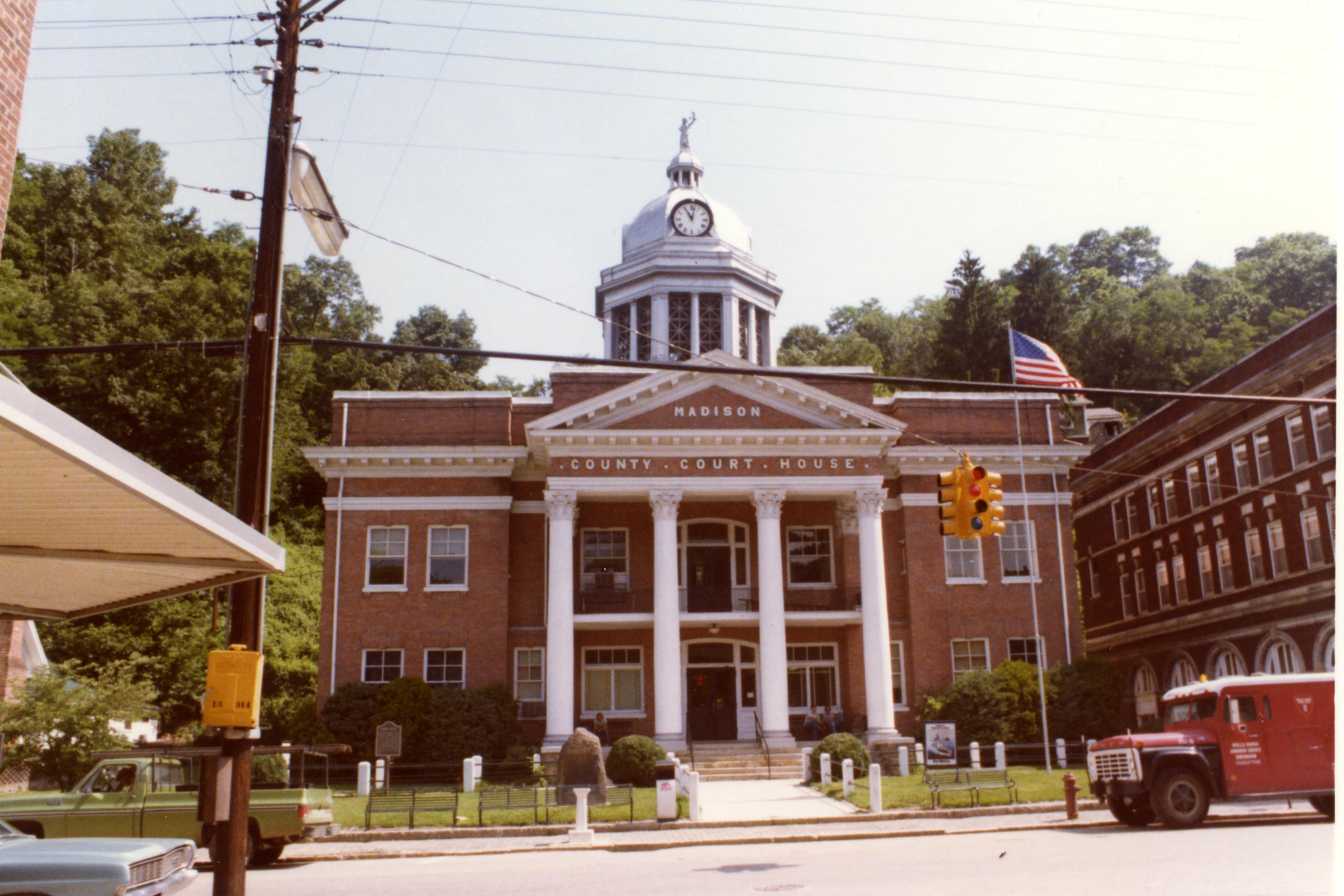
Madison County Courthouse in Marshall, North Carolina, 1977

The Ponder machine was an American political machine based in Madison County, North Carolina. Overseen by E.Y. Ponder and his younger brother, Zeno Ponder, it dominated politics in the county, particularly in the Democratic Party, from the 1950s until the 1980s.

== Background ==
=== Madison County ===
Madison County, North Carolina was formed in 1851. The county was politically dominated by the Republican Party, and eventually hosted an entrenched Republican political machine. Between 1851 and 1950 the office of Sheriff of Madison County was always held by a Republican, except for a single member of the Democratic Party that was elected to one term in 1932.

=== Ponder brothers ===
Zeno Ponder and Elymas Yates "E. Y." Ponder—the latter older than the former by 11 years—were brothers who grew up in a predominantly Republican family on a farm in Madison County. After earning a university degree in soil chemistry, Zeno worked for the United States government on the Manhattan Project during World War II. In the late 1940s he returned to Madison County and began teaching classes provided for by the G.I. Bill for returning war veterans. In these classes Ponder began to espouse his political beliefs, particularly promoting the desire for a strong Democratic presence in Madison County. He had been inspired by Democratic President Franklin D. Roosevelt's New Deal agenda, and also stated that since the North Carolina General Assembly was long dominated by Democrats, Madison County would need a solid Democratic base to attract appropriations for public works and development. After complaints were made by the local Republican Party about the politicization of Zeno's classes, the government suspended them.

=== 1950 Madison County Sheriff election ===
We took over the jail because we hadn't won any other offices at the courthouse.

— Zeno Ponder, 1985

In 1950 Zeno Ponder was appointed precinct registrar for the upcoming elections. He then set about aggressively registering local voters with the Democratic Party.

That year E. Y. Ponder ran for the office of sheriff as a Democrat, challenging the Republican incumbent, Hubert Davis. In the November 7 election Ponder was declared the winner by 31 votes. Davis disputed the results, alleging electoral fraud. Backed by his sheriff's deputies, he refused to vacate the office. Ponder filed a lawsuit in the North Carolina Superior Court to have his victory confirmed. On December 4, both men were sworn into a term of office by different court officers. Denied access to the courthouse facilities, Ponder created an office in the Madison County Jail. While the results were disputed, a "Republican jail" was maintained in opposition to the "Democratic jail". Republicans placed a machine gun outside their jail, and Democrats would drive by at night and throw firecrackers to frighten them. In early January 1951 the Superior Court ruled in Ponder's favor and ordered Davis to vacate his post. Davis appealed the case to the North Carolina Supreme Court, which affirmed the previous ruling on November 1. Even after the dispute was settled, Ponder kept the sheriff's office in the jail.

== Style and function ==
As sheriff, E. Y. Ponder wore a suit instead of a khaki law enforcement uniform and rarely carried a gun. He was well known in the county and relatively popular with local residents. He maintained a wide network of informants to gather information regarding criminal cases. He was generally lenient towards local offenders who voted for the Democratic Party, but pursued more aggressive action against outsiders. In contrast to E. Y., Zeno Ponder had a harsher reputation, and often carried a gun with him. By his own account, he and a Democratic registrar once had an armed standoff with four Republicans at a voting precinct. He served as secretary of the Madison County Democratic Executive Committee. Zeno never held elective public office, but served as the appointed chairman of the Madison County School Board from 1954 to 1966 and was chairman of the Madison County Board of Elections for a time. In the 1980s he served as the superintendent of Madison County Schools.

Zeno goes around building fires, and E. Y. comes along behind him putting them out.

— Pat Miller, former chairman of the Maidson County Board of Elections

According to a former operative in the Ponders' political machine, every election operatives would deliver two ballots boxes to each voting precinct, one empty and the other full of pre-marked ballots. After voting, the operatives would take the boxes to the courthouse and alter the contents of the boxes of official results in favor of their preferred candidate. According to a western North Carolina district attorney, Zeno Ponder and his operatives would go to local graveyards and take names off of the tombstones so ballots could be filled out in their name. Jokes about such "graveyard voting" in the county were frequent in North Carolina at the time. In a 1984 interview Zeno denied having ever participated in ballot box tampering but said, "I'd be the last to pretend all my friends are saints. I'm not that stupid—to think anybody would believe me."

Members of the machine assumed posts on county governance boards, allowing the organization to control patronage via the disbursement of jobs and funds. The Ponder brothers collected kickbacks from county school teachers. Republican Dedrick Brown, who later succeed Ponder as Sheriff of Madison County, alleged "If anybody wanted on food stamps or welfare or a job in the county they had control of—even state jobs at that time—he would go through the sheriff and he could put you on or take you off."

== History ==
=== Early history ===
In 1954 Zeno Ponder was appointed by the General Assembly to chair the Madison County Board of Elections. In that capacity, he dismissed and replaced all of the local registrars and election judges. Contrary to longstanding custom, he ignored the Republican Party's recommended appointees for precinct offices and instead appointed Republicans who were more agreeable to his own policy preferences. That year a Republican poll monitor was arrested for assault with a deadly weapon with intent to kill Zeno Ponder. Zeno left the elections board in 1956. The following year the Ponder brothers were arrested and charged with altering the contents of ballot boxes during a 1954 election. United States Attorney James M. Baley Jr. reported that he had collected more than 200 allegations of people being bribed for their vote and ballots being improperly notarized. The Ponders were tried in federal court before an all-Democratic jury, which found them not guilty.

In the 1960 United States presidential election, John F. Kennedy became the first Democrat to earn a majority of votes in Madison County in a presidential election since 1876. That same year a statewide bond referendum was defeated in North Carolina by fewer than 3,000 votes, a margin within which the number of votes in Madison County proved decisive. North Carolina Republican Party Chairman Bill Cobb wrote a letter to the governor, accusing Zeno of altering Madison County's returns, and forwarded the letter to several news outlets. Zeno sued Cobb for libel. A jury initially found in Zeno's favor, but on appeal the State Supreme Court overturned the jury's finding and ordered a new trial. The second civil trial failed to materialize after Cobb became enveloped by a personal political scandal.

In November 1962 a Republican poll monitor accused Zeno Ponder of pulling a gun on him during an argument at a voting precinct. Zeno admitted to drawing a gun but maintained that he only set it on the table and did not threaten the monitor. The Mayor of Marshall cleared Ponder of any wrongdoing.

=== 1964 elections ===
In 1964 the Ponder brothers agreed to back John Jordan Jr. in the Democratic primary election for the office of Lieutenant Governor. Another candidate, Robert W. Scott, traveled to the mountains and convinced Zeno to support him. Zeno then called Jordan, telling him, "I'm going to give you a few votes, but I can't give you the county." Scott subsequently won the county by a large margin. Simultaneously, Zeno ran for a seat in the North Carolina Senate. On the day of the Democratic primary election, anti-Ponder Democrats marched into Marshall carrying signs saying "Save our schools from crooked politics." That evening a brawl broke out at the Mars Hill polling place between anti-Ponder Democrats and E.Y. Ponder's sheriff's deputies after the former questioned the voting procedures following the discovery of an "extra" ballot box in a closet filled with ballots marked for Ponder.

Zeno was declared the winner of the primary. His opponent, Clyde Norton, decried the results as marred by irregularities and called upon the State Board of Elections to initiate an investigation. The board subsequently complied. When the State Bureau of Investigation attempted to examine Madison County's poll books, the records went missing and were never found. The person who had last handled the books also disappeared. The board also impounded the county's ballot boxes, but 23 of them were unable to be found. The board ultimately overturned the results of the senate primary, citing irregularities, and dismissed three members of the county board of elections. Norton won the primary runoff election. In that year's general elections Republicans won a large number of county offices. E.Y. Ponder lost reelection as sheriff to Roy Roberts, a Republican.

In the same election, Liston B. Ramsey, a Democrat and staunch ally of Zeno, lost his bid for reelection to his seat in the North Carolina House of Representatives to a Republican, F. Crafton Ramsey. The Ponders thus had no direct representation in state government, but Zeno dispatched Liston Ramsey to Raleigh, the state capital, anyway to take up residence while the General Assembly was in session. Ramsey quickly formed a bloc with fellow Democrats from mountain counties, including representatives Mark Bennet and J. Thurston Arledge, to represent his concerns in state government. The group worked together to prevent changes to state procedure for jury selection that would allow for bipartisan input, as the under the existing system jury selection in Madison County was controlled by a single Democratic official. In May 1965 Crafton Ramsey proposed a bill in the House that would unseat the all-Democratic school board chaired by Zeno and replace it with a new board including Republican representation in preparation for its transformation into a non-partisan body. The bill was rejected by the Democratic-dominated House Education Committee.

=== Later history ===
In 1966 a group of "reform" Democrats led by Joseph Huff challenged Zeno Ponder's dominance on the local Democratic Party committee. At the Democratic Party's county convention on May 14, the local committee chairman was absent, so Ponder ran the meeting even though that responsibility should have fallen to the vice chairwoman. Huff's group filed a complaint with the North Carolina Democratic Party's Credentials and Appeals Committee, bemoaning the impropriety of Zeno's chairmanship and accusing him of dismissing concerns about voting irregularities brought up at the convention. The state credentials committee ultimately ruled that party rules "were not followed in toto" but refrained from taking any action on the grounds that an intervention "would not materially affect the makeup" of the local committee. In November 1968 dynamite was placed along the fence along Zeno Ponder's property and detonated, damaging the fence and blowing out some windows of his house. Zeno told reporters that he thought a Republican was responsible.

E.Y. Ponder regained the office of sheriff in 1970. In 1981 Zeno Ponder was elected chairman of the Madison County Democratic Executive Committee. That year Governor Jim Hunt appointed him to the State Board of Transportation. He was reelected county Democratic chairman in 1983. In the 1984 United States Senate election in North Carolina, Republican incumbent Jesse Helms expressed his fear that Zeno would shift the electoral outcome to the Democratic candidate's favor. The following year United States Attorney Charles Brewer had him indicted for allegedly profiting off nonpublic information he gleaned from his position on the transportation board. Zeno attributed the federal legal proceedings against him to Helms, who he accused of maintaining a vendetta against him. A federal judge dismissed the charges, and two years later a Madison County Superior Court jury acquitted him on similar charges.

=== Decline ===
In the 1980s Republicans and anti-Ponder Democrats united to oust the Ponder machine. In 1986 E.Y. Ponder was challenged in his reelection bid by Dedrick Brown, a Republican and former sheriff's deputy who had lost to Ponder in 1970. A United States Marshal and Federal Bureau of Investigation agents established an outpost in a store owned by a Republican in Walnut to monitor the election. Voter turnout during the election was almost 75 percent, much higher than in previous years. Ponder ultimately lost to Brown by fewer than 400 votes. That December three Madison County public officials were dismissed, an action anti-Ponder locals attributed to the Ponder machine. In the late 1980s Brewer launched Project WestVote, an expansive federal investigation into voter fraud in western North Carolina. Anti-Ponder locals hoped the inquiry would remove the Ponder brothers' dominance from Madison County, while Zeno denounced it as a publicity stunt. Brewer started investigating the county in 1987 but left office before he could finish his work.

In 1989 Brown arrested E. Y. Ponder after the latter shot and wounded a man he claimed attacked him in his yard. A Madison County grand jury subsequently decided not to indict him. Brown was one of the few Republicans to be reelected to a local office in 1990. Growing Republican electoral strength in the early 1990s greatly weakened the Ponders' political dominance.

== Legacy ==
Zeno Ponder died in 1994. E. Y. Ponder died in 2001. The Ponder machine was the most famous "courthouse machine" of its time in North Carolina. Despite its termination, Democratic politicians continued to dominate local offices in the following years, and members of the Ponder family held elected office. Democratic influence waned some in the 2000s, and Madison County's electorate has favored Republican presidential candidates since 1996.

== Works cited ==
- Christensen, Rob (2010). The Paradox of Tar Heel Politics : The Personalities, Elections, and Events That Shaped Modern North Carolina (second ed.). Chapel Hill: The University of North Carolina Press. ISBN 978-0-8078-7151-5.
- Christensen, Rob (2019). The Rise and Fall of the Branchhead Boys: North Carolina's Scott Family and the Era of Progressive Politics. Chapel Hill: The University of North Carolina Press. ISBN 9781469651057.
- Menendez, Albert J. (2014). The Religious Factor in the 1960 Presidential Election: An Analysis of the Kennedy Victory Over Anti-Catholic Prejudice. McFarland. ISBN 9780786484935.
- Roberts, Bruce; Roberts, Nancy (1970). Where time stood still : a portrait of Appalachia. New York City: Crowell-Collier Press. OCLC 757248248.
