= 1968 North Carolina lieutenant gubernatorial election =

- November 5, 1968
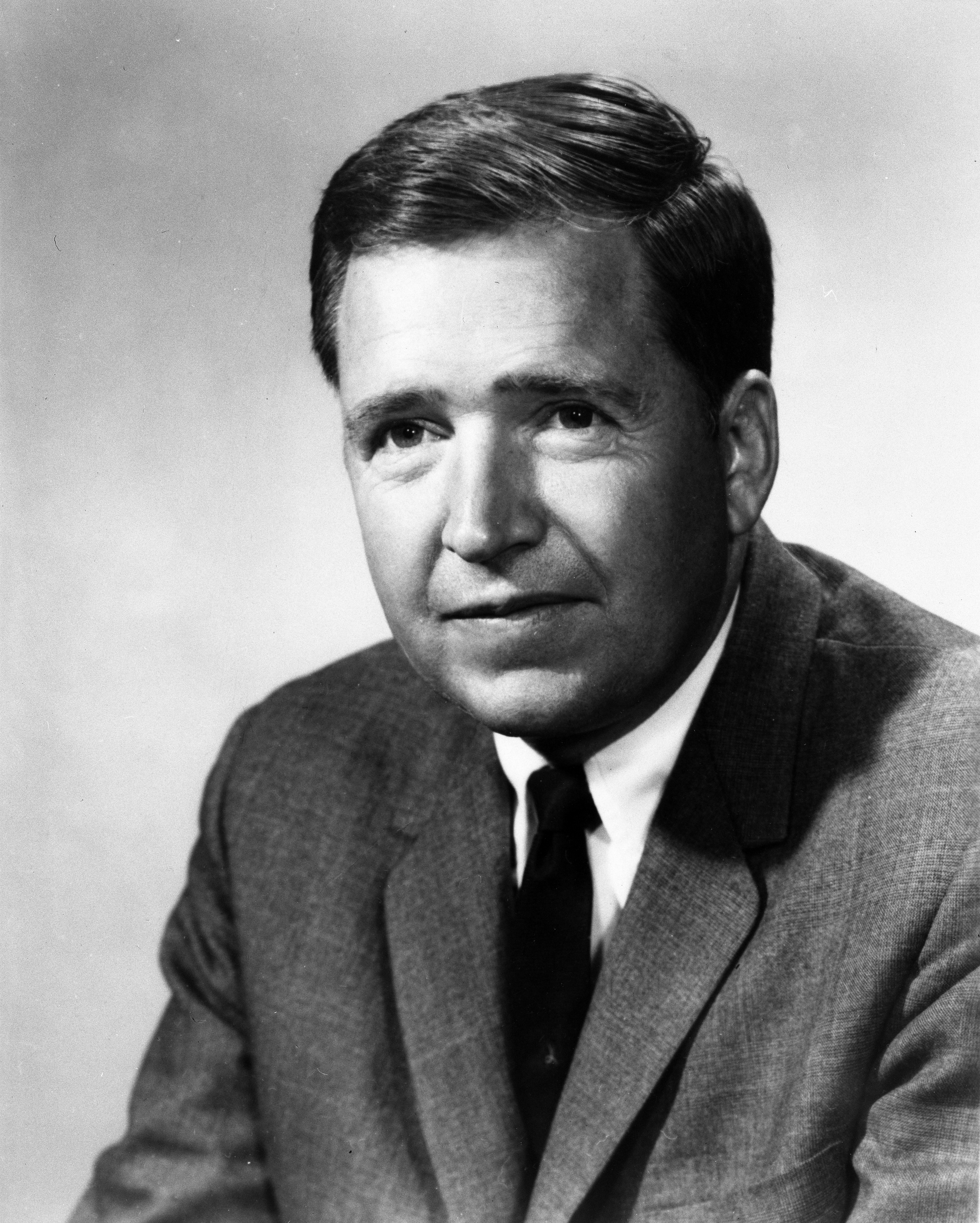

Nominee	Hoyt Patrick Taylor Jr.	Don H. Garren
Party	Democratic	Republican
Popular vote	801,955	646,643
Percentage	55.36%	44.64%
- County results Taylor: 50–60% 60–70% 70–80% 80–90% Garren: 50–60% 60–70% 70–80%
Lieutenant Governor before election
Robert W. Scott
Democratic
Elected Lieutenant Governor
Hoyt Patrick Taylor Jr.
Democratic

The 1968 North Carolina lieutenant gubernatorial election was held on November 5, 1968. Democratic nominee Hoyt Patrick Taylor Jr. defeated Republican nominee Don H. Garren with 55.36% of the vote.

== Primary elections ==
Primary elections were held on May 4, 1968.

=== Democratic primary ===
==== Candidates ====
- Hoyt Patrick Taylor Jr., former Speaker of the North Carolina House of Representatives
- Margaret T. Harper
- Frank M. Matlock

==== Results ====
Democratic primary results
Party	Candidate	Votes	%
Democratic	Hoyt Patrick Taylor Jr.	481,035	70.50
Democratic	Margaret T. Harper	148,613	21.78
Democratic	Frank M. Matlock	52,686	7.72
Total votes		682,334	100.00

=== Republican primary ===
==== Candidates ====
- Don H. Garren, State Representative
- Trosper N. Combs

==== Results ====
Republican primary results
Party	Candidate	Votes	%
Republican	Don H. Garren	98,437	74.74
Republican	Trosper N. Combs	33,268	25.26
Total votes		131,705	100.00

== General election ==
=== Candidates ===
- Hoyt Patrick Taylor Jr., Democratic
- Don H. Garren, Republican

=== Results ===
1968 North Carolina lieutenant gubernatorial election
Party	Candidate	Votes	%	±%
Democratic	Hoyt Patrick Taylor Jr.	801,955	55.36%	
Republican	Don H. Garren	646,643	44.64%	
Majority		155,312		
Turnout				
Democratic hold		Swing		
