= 1964 North Carolina lieutenant gubernatorial election =

- November 3, 1964
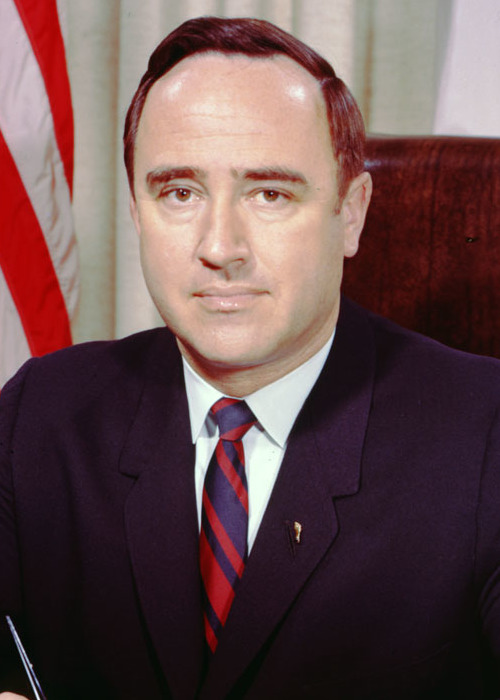

Nominee	Robert W. Scott	Clifford L. Bell
Party	Democratic	Republican
Popular vote	815,994	526,727
Percentage	60.77%	39.23%
- County results Scott: 50–60% 60–70% 70–80% 80–90% >90% Bell: 50–60% 60–70%
Lieutenant Governor before election
Harvey Cloyd Philpott
Democratic
Elected Lieutenant Governor
Robert W. Scott
Democratic

The 1964 North Carolina lieutenant gubernatorial election was held on November 3, 1964. Democratic nominee Robert W. Scott defeated Republican nominee Clifford L. Bell with 60.77% of the vote.

== Primary elections ==
Primary elections were held on May 30, 1964.

=== Democratic primary ===
==== Candidates ====
- Robert W. Scott
- H. Clifton Blue, former Speaker of the North Carolina House of Representatives
- John R. Jordan Jr., State Senator

==== Results ====
Democratic primary results
Party	Candidate	Votes	%
Democratic	Robert W. Scott	308,992	43.85
Democratic	H. Clifton Blue	255,424	36.25
Democratic	John R. Jordan Jr.	140,277	19.91
Total votes		704,693	100.00

Democratic primary runoff results
Party	Candidate	Votes	%
Democratic	Robert W. Scott	373,027	50.96
Democratic	H. Clifton Blue	359,000	49.04
Total votes		732,027	100.00

=== Republican primary ===
==== Candidates ====
- Clifford L. Bell, Insurance executive
- Robert A. Flynt

==== Results ====
Republican primary results
Party	Candidate	Votes	%
Republican	Clifford L. Bell	40,143	73.28
Republican	Robert A. Flynt	14,640	26.72
Total votes		54,783	100.00

== General election ==
=== Candidates ===
- Robert W. Scott, Democratic
- Clifford L. Bell, Republican

=== Results ===
1964 North Carolina lieutenant gubernatorial election
Party	Candidate	Votes	%	±%
Democratic	Robert W. Scott	815,994	60.77%	
Republican	Clifford L. Bell	526,727	39.23%	
Majority		289,267		
Turnout				
Democratic hold		Swing		
