= Robert W. Scott =

American politician (1929–2009)

Bob Scott
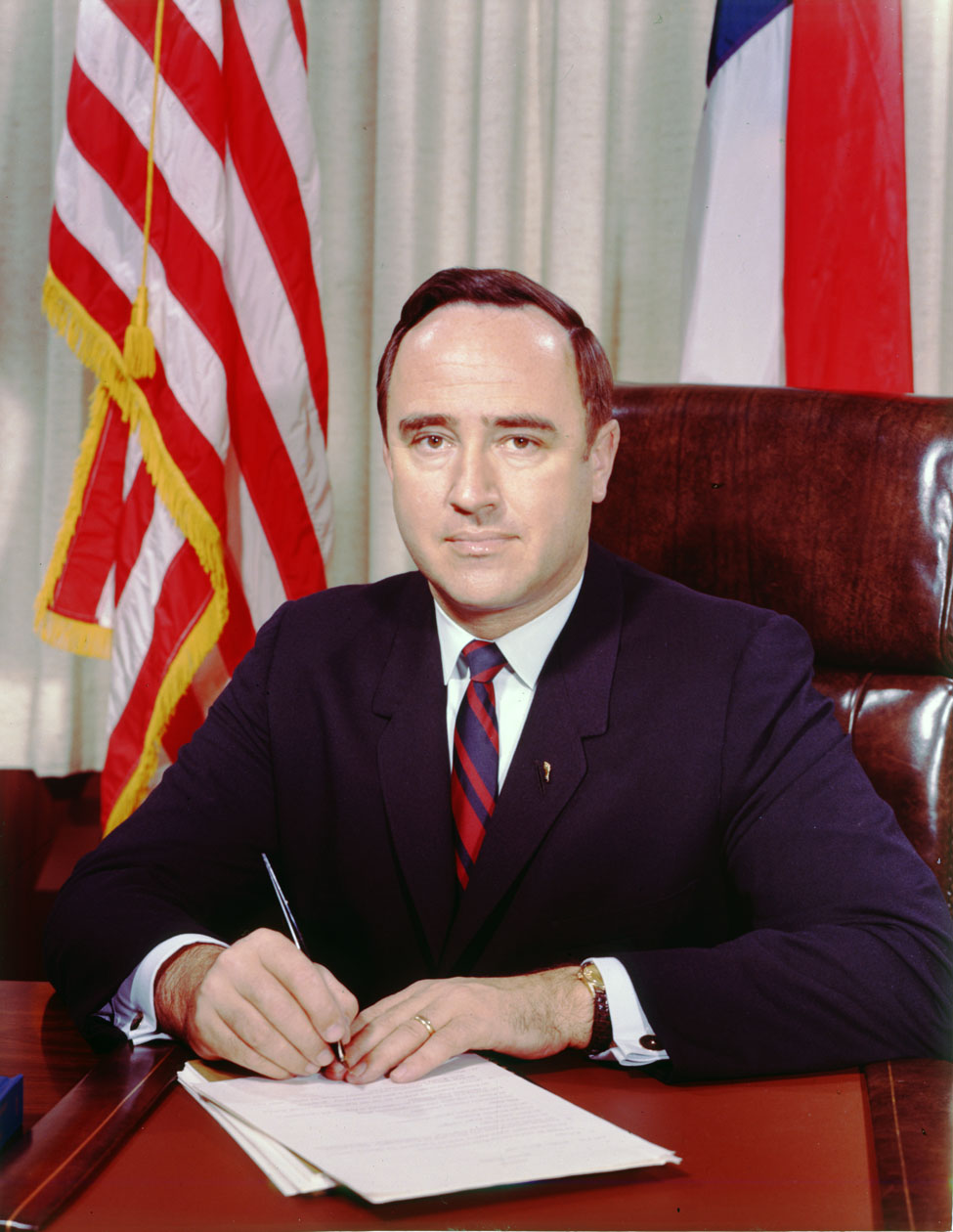

67th Governor of North Carolina
- In office January 3, 1969 – January 5, 1973
- Lieutenant: Hoyt Patrick Taylor Jr.
- Preceded by: Dan K. Moore
- Succeeded by: James Holshouser

25th Lieutenant Governor of North Carolina
- In office January 8, 1965 – January 3, 1969
- Governor: Dan K. Moore
- Preceded by: Harvey Cloyd Philpott
- Succeeded by: Hoyt Patrick Taylor Jr.

Personal details
- Born: June 13, 1929 Haw River, North Carolina, U.S.
- Died: January 23, 2009 (aged 79) Haw River, North Carolina, U.S.
- Party: Democratic
- Spouse: Jessie Rae Osborne (m. 1951)
- Children: 5, including Meg
- Parents: W. Kerr Scott; Mary White Scott
- Education: North Carolina State University (BS)

Military service
- Allegiance: United States
- Branch/service: United States Army
- Years of service: 1953–1955

Robert Walter "Bob" Scott (June 13, 1929 – January 23, 2009) was an American politician who served as the 67th Governor of North Carolina from 1969 to 1973. He was born and died in Haw River, North Carolina.

The son of North Carolina Governor W. Kerr Scott and First Lady Mary White Scott, and grandson and nephew of state legislators, Scott was a dairy farmer.

== Early life ==
Scott was born in the rural community of Haw River, Alamance County, NC to W. Kerr Scott and Mary White Scott, and grew up on the family dairy farm. His father Kerr became very prominent in North Carolina politics, serving as the state's Agriculture Commissioner, Governor and as a US Senator. After high school, Bob Scott attended Duke University and North Carolina State College (now NC State University) - from which he graduated in 1952. He was married to Jessie Rae Scott in 1951 and they had five children. Their daughter Meg Scott Phipps, would serve as the North Carolina Commissioner of Agriculture. From 1953 to 1955 Scott served in the US Army Counter Intelligence Corps. In 1959 Scott and his wife were voted by the National Grange of the Order of Patrons of Husbandry as one of the five top "Young Grange Couples" in the country.

== Lieutenant governor ==
=== 1964 campaign and election ===
In September 1963, the progressive wing of the North Carolina Democratic Party, led by Governor Terry Sanford and Bert Bennett, decided that they would support L. Richardson Preyer in the next gubernatorial election. The decision upset many Branchhead Boys and surprised Scott, who thought Preyer would be unpopular in eastern North Carolina. The following month Scott resigned from his position as head of the state Grange and began traveling across North Carolina to investigate his chances of winning a gubernatorial race. After deciding that the possibility was slim, he called a press conference in January 1964 to declare he would not seek the office of governor but would not rule out running for another office. In discussions with his advisers, Scott decided that he would not seek to become Commissioner of Agriculture like his father, deeming it to be a post of diminishing importance. He proposed seeking the office of Lieutenant Governor of North Carolina, though one of his advisers dismissed it as a "dead end". A week later his advisers changed their perception of the position, and several days after that Scott declared his candidacy for the Democratic nomination to the office. In his announcement he criticized the controversial Speaker Ban Law, a statute passed by the legislature late in the 1963 session that prevented members of the Communist Party and alleged subversives from delivering speeches at state universities. He called the law "not satisfactory" and said it portrayed university officials in a negative fashion. In the primary Scott faced Speaker of the State House of Representatives Clifton Blue and State Senator John Jordan.

Scott fashioned himself as a progressive, opposing the death penalty and calling for increased expenditure on roads and schools. He and the rest of the candidates maintained neutrality in the Democratic gubernatorial race between liberal L. Richardson Preyer and conservative Dan K. Moore. Scott's uncle, state legislator Ralph Scott, was a leading progressive critic of Moore and frequently attacked him in speeches. The criticism was so vigorous that Scott released a statement distancing himself from his uncle's politics. In the primary election Scott placed first, earning 306,992 votes (44 percent) to Blue's 255,424 votes (36 percent), while Jordan placed third. Scott's victory was aided by the support of courthouse machines, including the Ponder machine in Madison County. As Scott had not earned a 50 percent majority to be declared the victor outright, Blue called for a runoff, criticising the role of machines in Scott's performance. When Blue attempted to draw attention to voting irregularities in Madison County, Scott retorted that Blue had received aide from courthouse machines in Durham and Buncombe counties. As the two competed in the runoff, Scott secured the support of organized labor and criticized private power companies in an attempt to gain the sympathies of members of rural electric cooperatives.

In the Democratic primary runoff, Scott won 371,605 votes to Blue's 356,400 votes, thus securing the Democratic nomination. As in the first primary, he was aided by courthouse machines. Scott subsequently attended the 1964 Democratic National Convention in Atlantic City, New Jersey. He expressed reservations about President Lyndon B. Johnson's decision to choose Senator Hubert Humphrey as his running mate in the vice-presidential spot on the national Democratic ticket, but in September agreed to chair the Rural Americans for Johnson-Humphrey political action committee. In this capacity Scott frequently criticized Republican presidential candidate Barry Goldwater's policies in favor of reducing price supports for crops and opposing government spending on rural development, saying that his choices would harm the South's economy. Though it was uncommon for a presidential candidate to criticize a lieutenant gubernatorial candidate, Goldwater responded by attacking Scott's connections with alleged socialists. In the November election Scott defeated the Republican lieutenant gubernatorial candidate, Clifford Bell, earning 61 percent of the votes. Moore was elected Governor of North Carolina, and Johnson was reelected President.

=== Tenure ===
Scott was sworn in as Lieutenant Governor on January 8, 1965. He was the first person to hold the office since the previous incumbent, Harvey Cloyd Philpott, had died on August 19, 1961. The office held legislative powers, as its holder presided over the North Carolina Senate and had the responsibility of appointing legislators to committees and referring bills to them. The Lieutenant Governor was also ex officio a member of the State Board of Education. Scott commuted daily from his home in Haw River to Raleigh for work. In lieu of his own firm program, Scott generally supported Moore's policies, though the two came from different ideological factions in the Democratic Party and never shared a close personal relationship. Scott backed Moore's initiatives for a road construction bond issue and reform of state courts. He also supported Moore's quiet attempts to reform the Speaker Ban Law. Ralph Scott accused Moore of not doing enough to repeal the speaker law. Bob Scott, seeking to portray himself as a centrist, publicly distanced himself from his uncle and defended Moore's leadership. Scott presided over the Senate when the General Assembly was called to a special session to redraw North Carolina's legislative districts, as stipulated by federal court decisions related to the United States Supreme Court's ruling in Baker v. Carr and the doctrine of one man, one vote.

Scott largely used his time as Lieutenant Governor to prepare for a future gubernatorial bid. He delivered 203 speeches in 1965 and 245 the following year. He avoided controversial issues in his orations, and was concerned by the growing white backlash in the South in response to federal support for civil rights. In May 1967 he convened a meeting of advisers who told him that in order to ensure a successful gubernatorial bid in 1968 he would have to shed his reputation as a liberal. Taking their advice, Scott traveled to Dunn in November and gave a speech on law and order, strongly criticising civil rights protest violence, anti-Vietnam War demonstrators, and the black power movement. Jesse Helms praised Scott's address, but it was denounced by several state newspapers. In June 1968, a cross was burned on Scott's lawn in Haw River.

== Governor ==
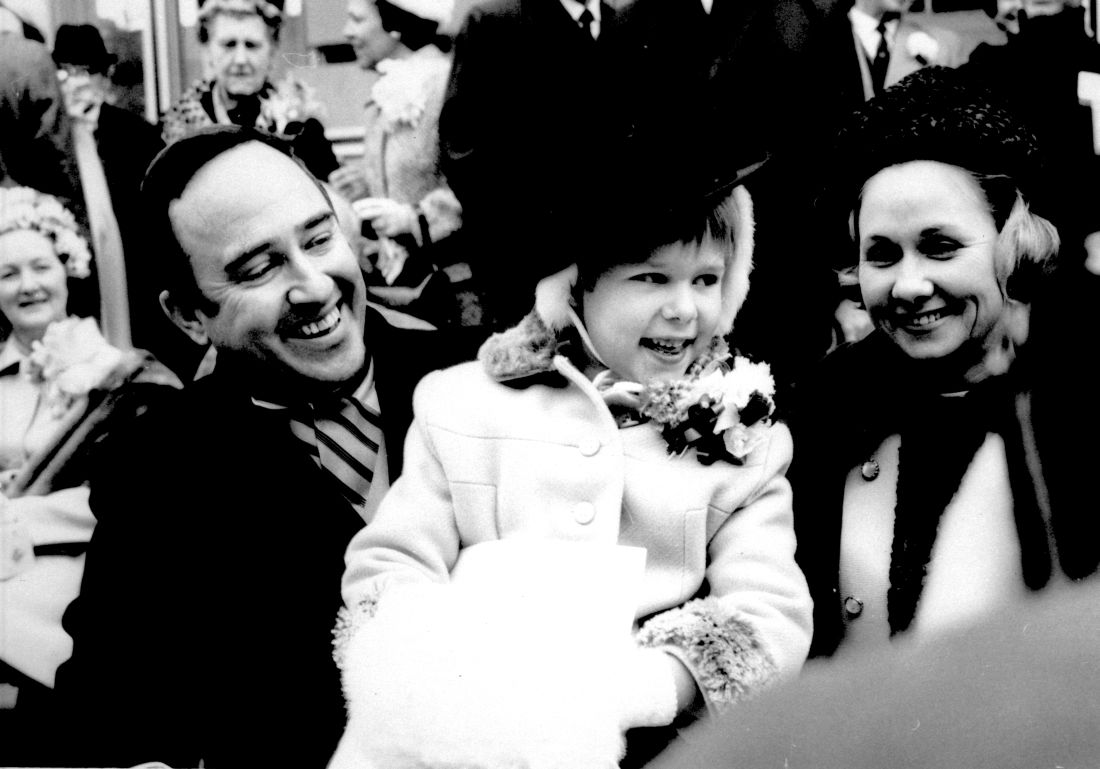
Scott celebrating his inauguration as governor with his daughter and wife, January 5, 1969

Scott was elected governor in 1968, taking office on January 3, 1969. In May 1969, during his term as governor, racial violence at North Carolina Agricultural & Technical State University, a predominantly black campus in Greensboro, resulted in one student death, and the injury of a National Guardsman, five Greensboro police officers and two students.

On June 26, 1972, Scott created the Executive Cabinet, an advisory body consisting of the members of the North Carolina Council of State, the appointed secretaries of the state's executive departments, and miscellaneous members appointed by the governor. He was succeeded by James Holshouser on January 5, 1973.

== Later life ==
Constitutionally barred from seeking another term, Scott later served as co-chairman of the Appalachian Regional Commission and as President of the North Carolina Community College System, from 1983 until 1995. He unsuccessfully ran for governor in 1980, losing in the Democratic primary to Jim Hunt.

His daughter, Meg Scott Phipps served as North Carolina Commissioner of Agriculture from 2001 to 2003.

Scott was honored in 2008 by the North Carolina Society for preserving state archives and historic artifacts and his efforts to increase awareness of the state's history.

Scott died in 2009 at the age of 79 and is buried in Hawfields Presbyterian Church Cemetery in Mebane, North Carolina.

His father's farm and birthplace, the Kerr Scott Farm, was added to the National Register of Historic Places in 1987.

== Works cited ==
- Cheney, John L. Jr., ed. (1981). North Carolina Government, 1585-1979 : A Narrative and Statistical History (revised ed.). Raleigh: North Carolina Secretary of State. OCLC 1290270510.
- Christensen, Rob (2019). The Rise and Fall of the Branchhead Boys: North Carolina's Scott Family and the Era of Progressive Politics. Chapel Hill: The University of North Carolina Press. ISBN 9781469651057.
- Fleer, Jack D. (1994). North Carolina Government & Politics. Lincoln: University of Nebraska Press. ISBN 9780803268852.

Political offices
| Preceded by Harvey Cloyd Philpott | Lieutenant Governor of North Carolina; 1965–1969 | Succeeded by Hoyt Patrick Taylor Jr. |
| Preceded by Dan K. Moore | Governor of North Carolina; 1969–1973 | Succeeded by James Holshouser |
Party political offices
| Preceded by Harvey Cloyd Philpott | Democratic nominee for Lieutenant Governor of North Carolina; 1964 | Succeeded by Hoyt Patrick Taylor Jr. |
| Preceded by Dan K. Moore | Democratic nominee for Governor of North Carolina; 1968 | Succeeded by Skipper Bowles |
| Preceded by John N. Dempsey | Chair of the Democratic Governors Association; 1970–1971 | Succeeded by Marvin Mandel |
Academic offices
| Preceded by Larry Blake | President of the North Carolina Community College System; 1983–1995 | Succeeded by Lloyd V. Hackley |
