= Charles T. Holt House =

Historic house in North Carolina, United States

- U.S. National Register of Historic Places
- Location within North Carolina Location within the United States
- Location: 228 Holt St., Haw River, North Carolina
- Coordinates: 36°05′09″N 79°22′11″W
- Area: 29.9 acres (12.1 ha)
- Built: 1897
- Built by: Montgomery, James R.
- Architect: Barber, George Franklin
- Architectural style: Queen Anne
- NRHP reference No.: 82003421
- Added to NRHP: June 1, 1982

Charles T. Holt House is a historic home located at Haw River, Alamance County, North Carolina. It was designed by architect George Franklin Barber and built in 1897. The house is a 2 1/2-story, rectangular dwelling sheathed in wood, slate, brick and stone in the Queen Anne style. It features peaks, turrets and decorative chimney stacks. Also on the property are the contributing carriage house, servant's quarters, gas house, corn crib, barn, and well house. It was built for textile businessman Charles T Holt, the son of Thomas Michael Holt, governor of North Carolina, and his wife Gena Jones Holt, the daughter of Thomas Goode Jones, governor of Alabama.

It was added to the National Register of Historic Places in 1982.
