= Hoyt Patrick Taylor Jr. =

American politician and attorney (1924–2018)

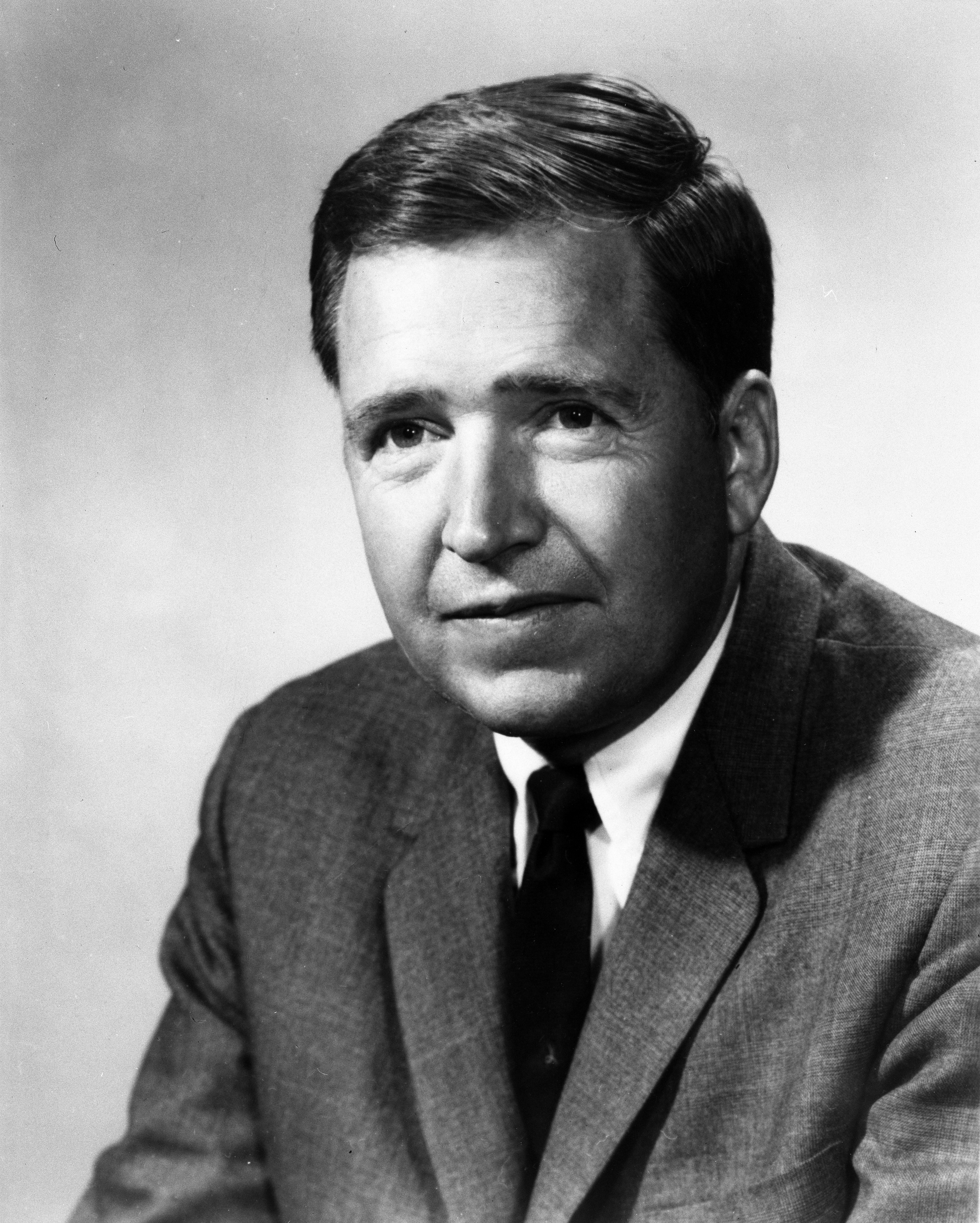

26th Lieutenant Governor of North Carolina
- In office January 3, 1969 – January 6, 1973
- Governor: Robert W. Scott
- Preceded by: Robert W. Scott
- Succeeded by: James B. Hunt Jr.

Speaker of the North Carolina House of Representatives
- In office 1965–1966
- Preceded by: H. Clifton Blue
- Succeeded by: David M. Britt

Member of the North Carolina House of Representatives from Anson County
- In office 1955–1967
- Preceded by: Hal W. Little
- Succeeded by: District abolished

Personal details
- Born: April 1, 1924 Wadesboro, North Carolina
- Died: April 22, 2018 (aged 94) Wadesboro, North Carolina
- Party: Democratic
- Education: University of North Carolina at Chapel Hill
- Profession: Lawyer
- Nickname: Pat

Military service
- Allegiance: United States of America
- Battles/wars: World War II, Korean War.

Hoyt Patrick "Pat" Taylor Jr. (April 1, 1924 – April 22, 2018) was an American politician and attorney who served as Speaker of the North Carolina House of Representatives and as the 26th Lieutenant Governor of North Carolina.

== Early life and career ==
Taylor was born in Wadesboro, North Carolina, on April 1, 1924, the son of Hoyt Patrick Taylor, who also served as Lieutenant Governor of the state. The two are the only father-son pair to have held the office. The younger Taylor went on to receive undergraduate and law degrees from the University of North Carolina at Chapel Hill, and to serve in the Marine Corps in both World War II and the Korean War. He subsequently practiced law in Wadesboro.

== Political career ==
In 1955, he was elected to represent Anson County in the North Carolina House of Representatives and served through 1967, the two last years as speaker.

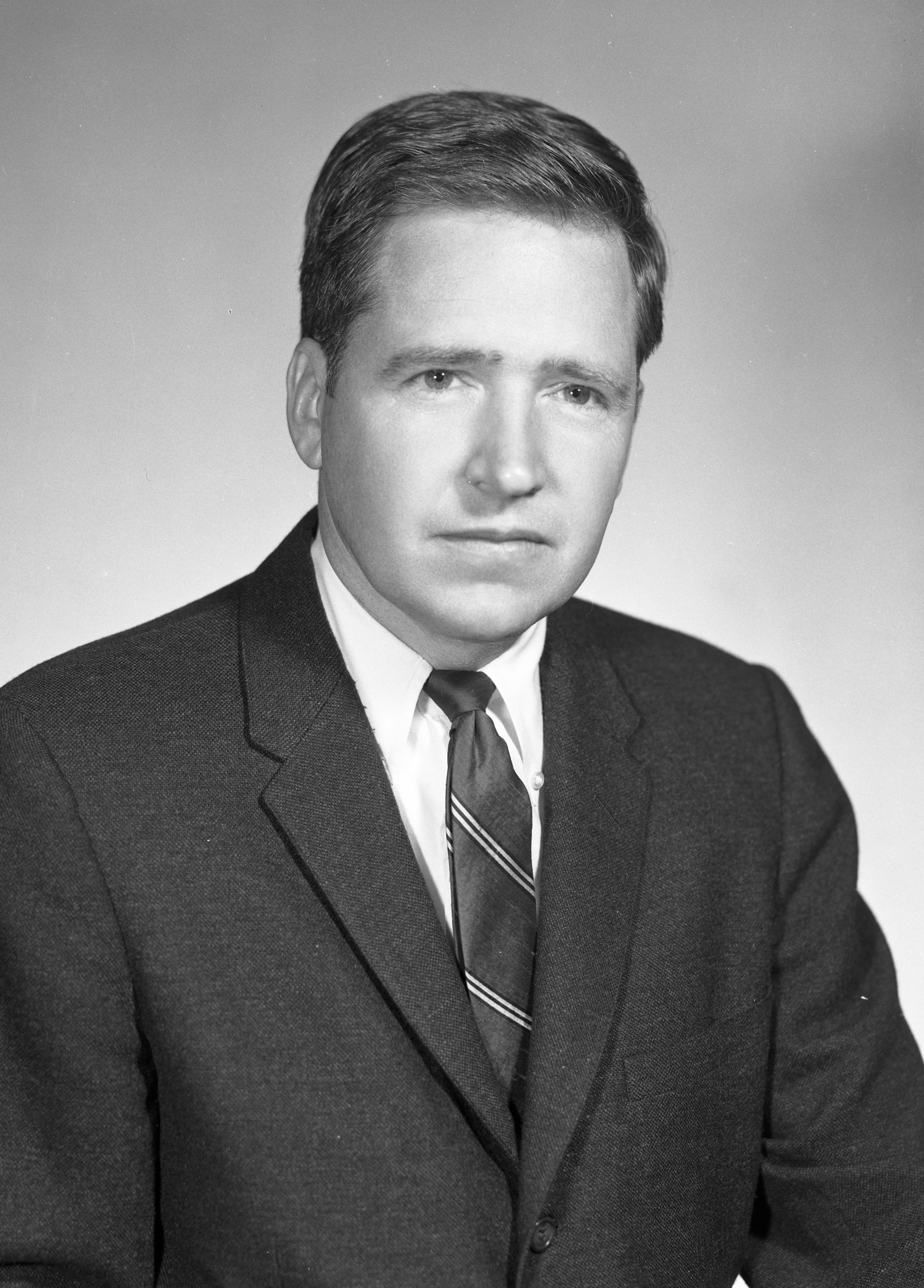
Taylor c. 1965

In May 1968, Taylor won the Democratic primary for Lieutenant Governor over Margaret Harper, the first woman to campaign for a major party's nomination for the post. He then went on to defeat State Rep. Don H. Garren in the general election of 1968 by the narrowest margin in decades (55-45%). He served as Lieutenant Governor for Governor Bob Scott from 1969 to 1973. He was close to the governor and assisted with the legislative agenda. To pay for increased spending on education and infrastructure, the administration favored increased taxes, including tobacco taxes. The period was marked by racial unrest, especially at the universities. Taylor opposed segregation and other racial inequalities, but did not at the time speak so clearly against racism as he would later do.

Scott was constitutionally prevented from running for another term as governor, and Taylor chose to become a candidate for the Democratic nomination for new governor. His prime opponents for the nomination were Skipper Bowles, a wealthy businessman who also had political and administrative experience, and Wilbur Hobby of the AFL-CIO. In the May 1972 primary, Bowles received about 372,000 votes to Taylor's about 310,000 The tax hikes had been unpopular and contributed to Taylor's relatively weak result. And while Taylor had run a traditional campaign, Bowles had introduced more sophisticated methods with regard to focus groups, opinion polls and television commercials with the help of political consultant Walter DeVries.

Taylor was defeated in the 1972 primary runoff by Bowles after a tough race where Taylor was supported by the Scott wing of the party, while Bowles was supported by much of the old Terry Sanford wing, as well as making inroads with black voters.

As one of many people, Taylor received a couple of votes for the Democratic Vice-Presidential nomination at the 1972 Democratic National Convention.

In his 2014 book The Making of a Southern Democracy, political scientist Tom Eamon describes Taylor as a calm and reasonable politician, but lacking somewhat in hunger for political power and sometimes informally described by contemporaries as being a little lazy.

== Later life, personal life and legacy ==
After the defeat in 1972, he retired from electoral politics and resumed the practice of law in Wadesboro. He was a member of several boards.

In 2005, Taylor published the book Fourth Down & Goal to Go where he wrote about life and politics in Anson County and North Carolina generally.

Taylor was married to Elizabeth Lockhart Taylor for over sixty years. They had three children and four grandchildren. In his older days, Taylor suffered from dementia. He died on April 22, 2018, at the age of 94 in Wadesboro, North Carolina. He was a member of the Calvary Episcopal Church of Wadesboro, a Rotarian and a Freemason.

The North Carolina General Assembly honored Taylor and his father in a resolution in 2010. South Piedmont Community College named a center after him and his wife and part of a local road has got his name.

Party political offices
Preceded by Robert W. Scott	Democratic nominee for Lieutenant Governor of North Carolina; 1968	Succeeded by Jim Hunt
Political offices
Preceded by Robert W. Scott	26th Lieutenant Governor of North Carolina; 1969–1973	Succeeded by James B. Hunt Jr.
Preceded by H. Clifton Blue	Speaker of the North Carolina House of Representatives; 1965–1966	Succeeded by David M. Britt
