= Courthouse clique =

A courthouse clique, courthouse machine, courthouse ring, courthouse gang, or courthouse crowd is a type of political machine in the United States principally composed of county-level public officials. Historically, they were especially predominant in the South until the mid-20th century.

== Historical era ==
=== Rise ===
During the colonial period of the United States, the early forms of government established across the Eastern Coast differed by region. In the North, Puritan-led communities set-up democratic systems rooted in local participation. In the South, particularly the Colony of Virginia, more oligarchical forms of governance resembling the systems used in the Kingdom of England were established by the ruling groups. The royal governors appointed county officials, particularly justices of the peace. As in England, the justices were responsible for managing local affairs including setting taxation rates, regulating businesses, and maintaining roads. Other colonies in the South adopted a similar pattern of administration. Most of the appointees were members of the landed gentry and had life-long tenures. Over time they developed significant independence from the governors, and began asserting their right to fill local vacancies. Governors assented to these demands by generally appointing the justices' nominees for vacancies and their choices for sheriffs and other officials. The justices, by virtue of their control over county administration, assumed considerable influence over colonial legislative elections. Despite some occasional protests from poorer citizens, the county courts became a medium by which wealthy planters exercised control over politics in the South. Public agitation towards courthouse cliques contributed to the outbreak of the War of the Regulation in North Carolina.

=== 19th century democratic reforms ===
The court system in the South remained relatively unchanged until the early 1800s. In that time the number of court officials had burgeoned so that some counties had as many 90 justices at once. Meanwhile, the incumbent officers were increasingly criticized by the public for alleged inefficiency, incompetence, and corruption. Professional lawyers spearheaded demands for reform by attacking the planter-justices' lack of legal education. The proliferation of Jacksonian democracy as a political philosophy also challenged the position of the appointed court officers. State legislatures created new statutes and wrote new constitutions which dispensed of the justices and empowered themselves or the citizens of a given county to elect judges for fixed terms. By 1861 most citizens in the South could elect their sheriffs, coroners, constables, and other county officials. Planters still held many local offices but were forced to reckon with the demands of common voters.

=== Post-Reconstruction consolidation ===
In the Reconstruction era that followed the American Civil War in the South, the systems of choosing local officials was further democratized. However, by the 1870s the planter class, well-embedded in the Democratic Party, began a campaign to "redeem" the South from the control of Radical Republicans, which had disrupted the previous social order and elevated the political prominence of black freedmen, "carpetbaggers", and "scalawags". Allying themselves with emerging industrialists, the planters moved to quickly curtail any further disruption. In Florida, Louisiana, and North Carolina the Democrats successfully stripped the ability of citizens to choose their local governments and made such choices the purview of either the state legislature or governor. Violence and electoral fraud, aided by county-level politicians, helped secure Democratic control of the "Solid South" elsewhere. Courthouse cliques also became entrenched in Kentucky county politics.

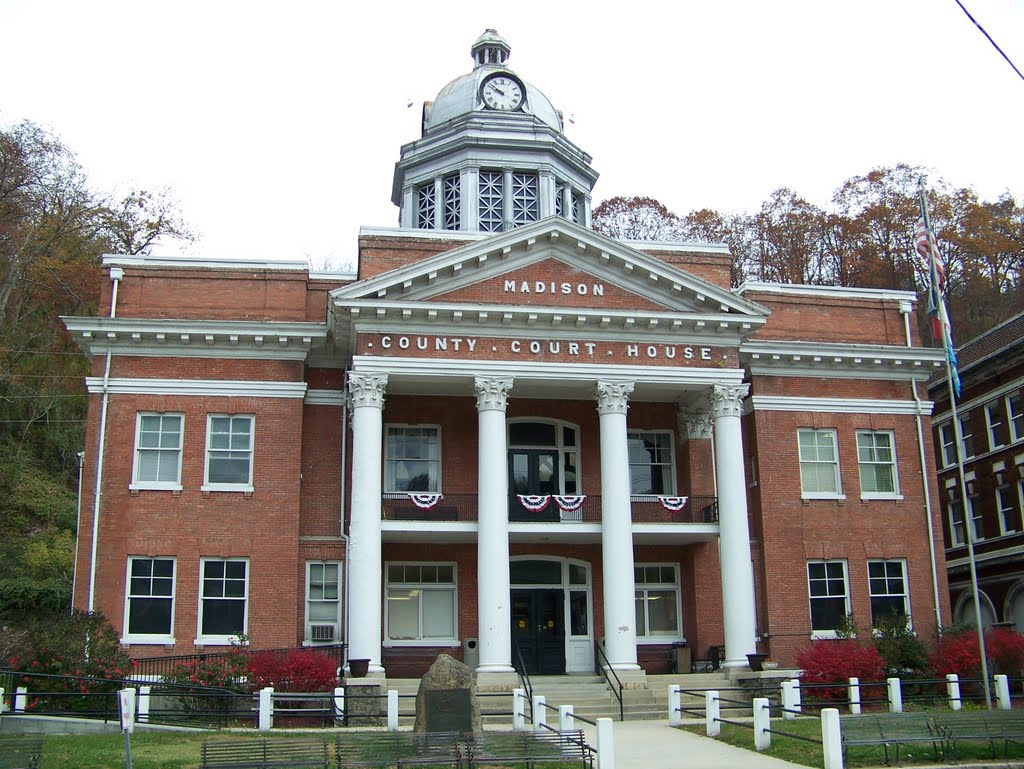
The Madison County Courthouse in Marshall, North Carolina. Madison County was home to the Ponder machine, a courthouse clique run by a sheriff and his brother. It was the most well-known machine in North Carolina during its existence from the 1950s until the 1980s.

Under Democratic dominance in the South, most county-level offices were filled by Democratic candidates who were selected at local conventions, often nominating a single candidate for a post who would go on to win formal election. Almost all candidates were white men. Courthouses served as convenient forums for politics, since they allowed politicians—and ambitious attorneys in particular—to meet with important local figures and gave them chances to speak to groups of locals. Courthouses were also often located near networks of communication which allowed politicians to establish contact with other public figures across a state. The cliques were never formal organizations, but were instead groups of men who had social prominence, business connections, and long residency in public office that managed affairs through personal relationships. The leaders of courthouse cliques who exerted the most influence varied across different states. In Alabama, probate judges were generally the most powerful county figures, while in Virginia circuit court judges were the most privileged. In Louisiana and Mississippi the control of county politics often rested with sheriffs, who monitored gambling and bootlegging in their jurisdictions. Some county political leaders in the South from both the Democratic Party and Republican Party practiced vote buying to ensure the election of their preferred candidates. The Democratic dominance of the South provoked the ire of Republicans and independents, who frequently complained of courthouse cliques wielding control of public affairs. The perception of county political machine control also upset poor white farmers and contributed to the growth of the Populist movement in the 1890s and its demands for reform. Others became apathetic towards politics, feeling that their votes made little difference in the outcome of elections and government decisions.

While the South was under Democratic Party dominance throughout the first half of the 20th century, the power and influence of courthouse cliques varied across the region. They generally wielded more control in lowland areas—historically the site of plantations—than in the more economically egalitarian Piedmont and mountainous areas. By the 1930s and 1940s courthouse machines in Louisiana, Tennessee, and Virginia generally aligned themselves with a dominant faction within their respective state Democratic Party organizations. In other states, particularly Georgia, the cliques would form ad hoc alliances to shape the outcome of state elections. Nationwide, the general trend of apportioning state representatives to individual counties gave political organizations in rural counties outsized influence in state affairs. Courthouse cliques maintained a high degree of influence over Southern politics through the 1950s.

=== Decline ===
Corruption in county governments led civic groups such as the National Short Ballot Organization to begin calling for reform in the early 20th century. In response to the Great Depression in the 1930s, the United States federal government initiated a series of programs known as the New Deal, greatly contributing to the growth of federal and state bureaucracies and thereby challenging the courthouse cliques' positions as centers of political power. In the post-World War II era the South underwent significant social change. Returning war veterans made efforts to eject local political machines, which they viewed as obstacles to economic growth. In the "Battle of Athens" of 1946, armed veterans in McMinn County, Tennessee engaged in a shootout with sheriff's deputies in the employ of the local courthouse ring during an election dispute, forcing them to surrender ballot boxes and ousting the local government.

Across the South urbanization, industrialization, and immigration from the North increased. Educational opportunities increased and improvements in mass communication were made. These changes cultivated the growth of a cosmopolitan culture in the South and boosted the strength of the Republican Party. The promulgation of the one man, one vote doctrine by the United States Supreme Court in Baker v. Carr and Gray v. Sanders and subsequent reapportionment shifted political power away from rural counties and towards urban areas. Meanwhile, civil rights legislation enabled millions of black people in the South to vote. Faced with these political disruptions, courthouse cliques quickly declined throughout the 1960s and 1970s. In the following years increased numbers of women and blacks were able to attain county offices. The Democratic Party also moved away from its reliance on courthouse cliques and began building a more top-down, institutionalized party structure with a professional, permanent staff. Southern candidates stopped seeking the endorsement of local politicians and their networks and instead began appealing directly to the electorate through mass media for support.

== Legacy ==
Journalistic exposés, scholarly works, movies, and fictional writings have emphasized the historical importance of courthouse cliques in Southern politics and led to the creation of a stereotype portraying county governments in the South as dominated by corrupt politicians who use undemocratic methods to protect their power and their wealthy allies. While no longer forming extensive political networks or wielding wide influence, county office-holders still retain a significant amount of responsibility for law enforcement and the delivery of public services in their jurisdictions.

== Works cited ==
- Ayers, Edward L. (2007). The Promise of the New South: Life After Reconstruction (15th Anniversary annotated ed.). Oxford University Press. ISBN 9780199886838.
- Campbell, Tracy (2010). Short of the Glory: The Fall and Redemption of Edward F. Prichard Jr. University Press of Kentucky. ISBN 9780813128191.
- Christensen, Rob (2010). The Paradox of Tar Heel Politics : The Personalities, Elections, and Events That Shaped Modern North Carolina (second ed.). Chapel Hill: The University of North Carolina Press. ISBN 978-0-8078-7151-5.
- Coppa, Frank J. (2000). County Government : A Guide to Efficient and Accountable Government. Westport & London: Praeger. ISBN 0-275-96829-4.
- Moody, Kim (2017). On New Terrain: How Capital is Reshaping the Battleground of Class War. Haywood Press. ISBN 9781608468720.
- Moore, James Tice (2014). "County Politics". Law and Politics. The New Encyclopedia of Southern Culture. Vol. 10. UNC Press Books. pp. 173–176. ISBN 9781469616742.
- Woodard, J. David (2006). The New Southern Politics. L. Rienner Publishers. ISBN 9781588263971.
