= Straight Talk America =

Straight Talk America was a political action committee and intercampaign outreach vehicle created by Senator John McCain. Originally formed during McCain’s 2000 bid for the Republican presidential nomination, it was revived again in 2005, and then retired in 2007 as he announced his formal bid for the presidency in 2008.

== Notable people ==
- Terry Nelson, Senior Advisor
- Lance Tarrance, Adviser – formerly of RT Strategies
- Charlie Condon, Co-chair – former Attorney General of South Carolina
- Bob McAllister, Co-Chair
- Henry McMaster, Attorney General of South Carolina
- Craig Goldman, former executive director; member of the Texas House of Representatives from his native Fort Worth

== Funding ==
According to FEC filings:

- 2006 – $7,938,413
- 2008 – $373,703
