= Don Garren =

American lawyer and politician

Don H. Garren (1933–2018) was an American lawyer and politician.

Garren was the Republican candidate who defeated Adgar F. Sexton in the November 1966 state legislative election, and won the Henderson County seat in the North Carolina House of Representatives. During his tenure as state representative, Garren served within the state house as minority leader. Garren did not file to run for reelection in the 46th House District by March 1968, instead focusing on the Republican Party nomination for the lieutenant governorship, which he secured by May of that year. Garren subsequently lost the lieutenant governorship to Hoyt Patrick Taylor Jr.

Garren studied English at the University of North Carolina at Chapel Hill, then taught English and SAT courses at the United States Naval Academy, before returning to North Carolina and graduating from the Wake Forest University School of Law. Outside of politics, Garren was a lawyer. He married Linda Blanton in 1970. Garren died on 24 June 2018, aged 84.

Party political offices
Preceded by Clifford L. Bell	Republican nominee for Lieutenant Governor of North Carolina; 1968	Succeeded by John A. Walker
