= Haw River, North Carolina =

- Town
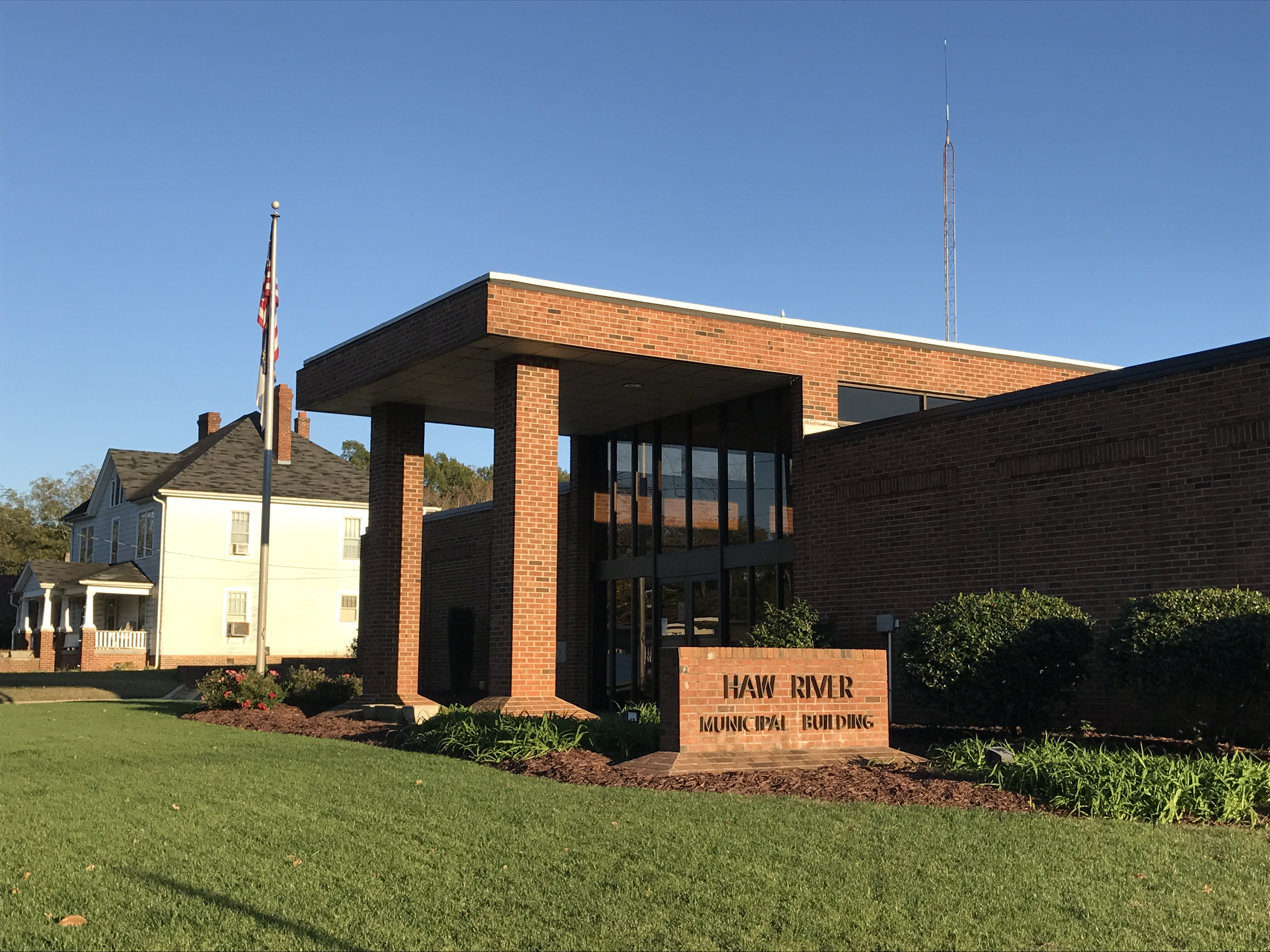
- Town Municipal Building

- Seal

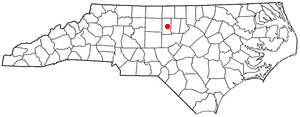
- Location of Haw River, North Carolina

- Location within North Carolina Location within the United States
- Coordinates: 36°05′34″N 79°21′42″W
- Country: United States
- State: North Carolina
- County: Alamance

Government
  - Mayor: H. Lee Lovette

Area
  - Total: 2.94 sq mi (7.62 km^{2})
  - Land: 2.89 sq mi (7.49 km^{2})
  - Water: 0.050 sq mi (0.13 km^{2})
- Elevation: 581 ft (177 m)

Population (2020)
  - Total: 2,252
  - Density: 778.7/sq mi (300.64/km^{2})
- Time zone: UTC-5 (Eastern (EST))
  - Summer (DST): UTC-4 (EDT)
- ZIP code: 27258
- Area code: 336
- FIPS code: 37-30260
- GNIS feature ID: 2405805
- Website: www.townofhawriver.com

Haw River is a town in Alamance County, North Carolina, United States. It is part of the Burlington, North Carolina Metropolitan Statistical Area. At the 2020 census, the population was 2,252.

== Geography ==
Haw River is bordered by Burlington to the west, Graham to the south, and Green Level to the north.

According to the United States Census Bureau, the town has a total area of 2.9 square miles (7.4 km^{2}), of which 2.8 square miles (7.3 km^{2}) is land and 0.039 square miles (0.1 km^{2}), or 1.38%, is water. The town is named for the Haw River, which flows past the center of town. The town formerly supported a textile mill producing enormous quantities of corduroy but is primarily a residential area today. Governor Thomas Michael Holt was a resident of the town. Governor W. Kerr Scott lived nearby, as did his son, Governor Robert W. Scott.

== Demographics ==
Historical population
Census	Pop.	Note	%±
1890	317		—
1980	1,858		—
1990	1,855		−0.2%
2000	1,908		2.9%
2010	2,298		20.4%
2020	2,252		−2.0%
U.S. Decennial Census

=== 2020 census ===
As of the 2020 census, Haw River had a population of 2,252. The median age was 37.8 years. 24.1% of residents were under the age of 18 and 14.8% of residents were 65 years of age or older. For every 100 females there were 89.7 males, and for every 100 females age 18 and over there were 89.3 males age 18 and over.

93.0% of residents lived in urban areas, while 7.0% lived in rural areas.

There were 917 households in Haw River, including 624 families. Of all households, 32.3% had children under the age of 18 living in them. Of all households, 40.2% were married-couple households, 18.9% were households with a male householder and no spouse or partner present, and 32.4% were households with a female householder and no spouse or partner present. About 28.2% of all households were made up of individuals and 11.8% had someone living alone who was 65 years of age or older.

There were 1,096 housing units, of which 16.3% were vacant. The homeowner vacancy rate was 1.7% and the rental vacancy rate was 2.8%.

Haw River racial composition
Race	Number	Percentage
White (non-Hispanic)	1,416	62.88%
Black or African American (non-Hispanic)	255	11.32%
Native American	6	0.27%
Asian	15	0.67%
Other/Mixed	104	4.62%
Hispanic or Latino	456	20.25%

=== 2010 census ===
As of the census of 2010, there were 2,298 people, 921 households, and 625 families residing in the town. The population density was 821 inhabitants per square mile (317/km^{2}). There were 1,035 housing units at an average density of 356.9 per square mile (137.8/km^{2}). The racial makeup of the town was 75.9% White, 9.3% African American, 0.4% Native American, 0.9% Asian, 11.5% from other races, and 2% from two or more races. Hispanic or Latino of any race were 16.1% of the population.

There were 921 households, out of which 34.3% had children under the age of 18 living with them, 46.9% were married couples living together, 16.1% had a female householder with no husband present, and 32.1% were non-families. 27.5% of all households were made up of individuals, and 10.2% had someone living alone who was 65 years of age or older. The average household size was 2.49 and the average family size was 3.02.

In the town, the population was spread out, with 26.6% under the age of 19, 6.3% from 20 to 24, 25.8% from 25 to 44, 26.6% from 45 to 64, and 14.5% who were 65 years of age or older. The median age was 38.5 years. For every 100 females, there were 104 males. For every 100 females age 18 and over, there were 101.5 males.

The median income for a household in the town was $35,691, and the median income for a family was $46,023. Males had a median income of $30,250 versus $20,250 for females. The per capita income for the town was $20,205. About 10.3% of families and 15.2% of the population were below the poverty line, including 14.4% of those under age 18 and 8% of those age 65 or over.

== Education ==
The local public school in Haw River is Haw River Elementary School, part of the Alamance-Burlington School System, which was created by a merger between the Alamance County School System and the Burlington City School System in 1996.

== History ==
In 1745, Adam Trollinger established a homestead on the banks of the Haw River. From that beginning, the community of Haw River was developed. Trollinger was a native of the Rhine river valley in Germany and had lived in Pennsylvania before heading south to seek a new life. His settlement was very near the site of an earlier Sissipahaw Indian village. Trollinger chose the spot because it had an easy crossing while nearby the river moved with enough power to drive a mill wheel.

In 1748, Adam's son, Jacob, built a grist mill, one of the first industries in the wilderness area. A village known as Trollinger's Ford grew up around the mill.

Lord Cornwallis passed nearby during the last days of the Revolutionary War. His foraging soldiers raided Trollinger's mill and confiscated the miller's grain. When Jacob confronted the redcoats, they bound him to a tree with a bridle bit in his mouth. Upon his release, Trollinger sent two of his sons and a slave to help fight the British.

Benjamin Trollinger built the first part of the Granite Mill in 1844, marking the beginning of the textile industry in the village. It is the only antebellum mill building in Alamance County still in use. Since that time, the development of the town has been inextricably linked to events at the mill.

In 1849, the North Carolina Railroad was chartered and Benjamin Trollinger secured its passage through the mill town by building a railroad bridge over the river at his own expense. The town became known as Haw River Depot. Benjamin Trollinger also was instrumental in locating the railroad repair station at Company Shops (now Burlington) a few miles west.

As a result of financial difficulties brought on by the failure of Trollinger's hotel in Haw River, Edwin Michael Holt, already one of the state's most successful manufacturers, and his son, Thomas M. Holt, acquired the mill in 1858. In 1861, Thomas M. Holt bought his father's interest in the property and moved to Haw River to oversee the running of the mill.

During the Civil War, much cloth was shipped to Raleigh for Confederate uniforms. As the war drew to a close, gold and other treasures were hidden near the railroad line in and around Haw River, and tales of buried treasure persist.

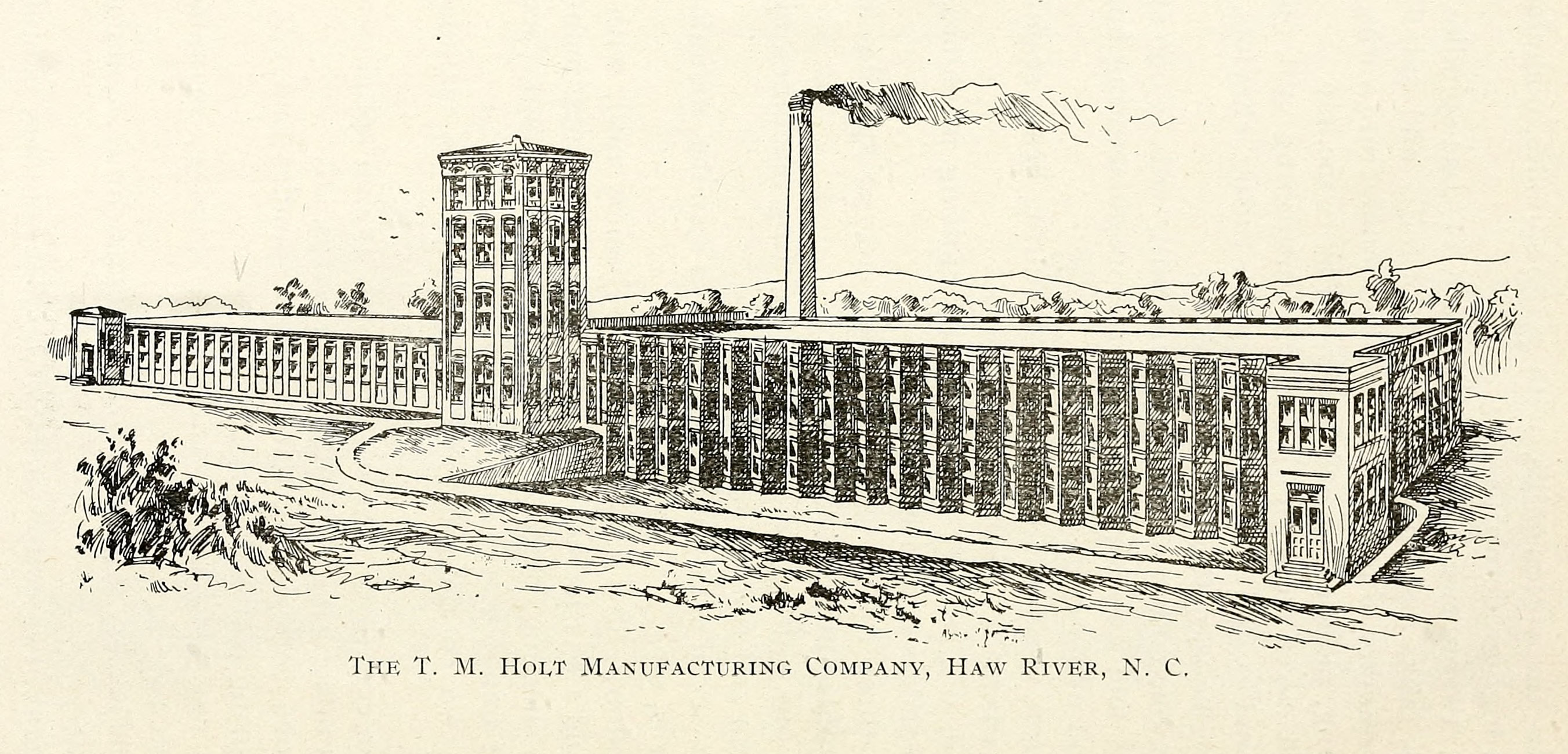
T. M. Holt Manufacturing Company, Haw River, North Carolina, 1897

In 1868, Thomas Holt's brother-in-law, Adolphus "Dolph" Moore, became partner in the mill, and the operation was called Holt and Moore. George Swepson came to town, and barges began carrying raw cotton to his mill in Swepsonville and returning with spun products to be shipped by rail.

In 1876, Dolph Moore was found shot in George Swepson's yard. When Moore died, George Swepson was charged with the crime. Though acquitted, he was forced to leave town. The mills became the Thomas M. Holt Manufacturing Company.

Haw River developed as a typical mill village in which the mill owned the homes of the millworkers and operated the company store. Many people moved from family farms to the community around the mill. Community life centered on sections within the town like Red Slide, Pine Knot, Sugar Hill, and Johnson City.

In 1881, Thomas M. Holt built a power dam across the river and a second mill across the street from Granite. Holt's progressive management of the mill and his leadership of the North Carolina Railroad and the Grange led to a term as governor between 1891 and 1893. He died in 1896, leaving his son, Charles, to run the mill. The mill underwent several changes in management in the first quarter of the twentieth century.

The railroad bridge was the scene of derailments in 1911, 1936, and 1960. The last wreck damaged the depot which led to its demolition.

In 1928, the cotton factories in Haw River were acquired by Proximity Manufacturing, which later became Cone Mills Corporation. When corduroy became popular, the company decided to produce the cloth in Haw River. The plants south of Main Street were renamed Tabardrey and were equipped with new machinery to produce corduroy. The mills north of the highway became Granite Finishing for the finishing of the cloth. Corduroy production began on May 1, 1930, and Granite was shipping finished goods by June of the same year.

The little town thrived in the years following World War II. Businesses flourished on Main Street in the 1950s, and the Cone plants became the largest producers of corduroy in the world, employing over 1,000 people in 1981.

William Kerr Scott served as governor of North Carolina from 1949 to 1953, and from 1969 to 1973 his son, Robert Walker Scott, held the same office. Both men had Haw River addresses so that the only three governors from Alamance County are claimed by Haw River.

Haw River was officially incorporated on June 1, 1973. The Haw River municipal building was dedicated on Sunday, July 18, 1976, as part of the nation's bicentennial. The Haw River Municipal Park was opened on August 7, 1981.

Haw River is the location of the untimely death of blood plasma pioneer Dr. Charles Drew, on April 1, 1950. He was driving a group of his colleagues to a medical conference in Alabama when he apparently dozed off at the wheel, resulting in a crash and the mortal wounds that were the cause of his death. An urban myth developed that he had been denied treatment and allowed to bleed to death, because of his being black, but eyewitnesses, including one of his fellow doctors who was at the hospital, have testified that nothing of the sort happened, as detailed in the Raleigh News and Observer.

In 1994, scientists identified a large kindred of people in Haw River affected by the same neurological genetic disease, which they called Haw River Syndrome and recognized as identical to dentatorubral–pallidoluysian atrophy.

The Charles T. Holt House and Kerr Scott Farm are listed on the National Register of Historic Places.

== Notable people ==
- Thomas Michael Holt, 47th Governor of North Carolina from 1891 to 1893
- Louisa Moore Holt, First Lady of North Carolina
- Robert Walker Scott, 67th Governor of the state of North Carolina from 1969 to 1973
- W. Kerr Scott, Governor of North Carolina from 1949 to 1953 and United States senator from 1954 to 1958
- Mary White Scott, First Lady of North Carolina from 1949 to 1953
- Shag Thompson, former MLB player
- Max Wilson, former MLB player for the Philadelphia Phillies and Washington Senators
