= V. Lance Tarrance Jr. =

Republican American pollster and political strategist

- Education: Washington and Lee University; American University
- Political party: Republican

Vernon Lance Tarrance Jr. is a Republican American pollster and political strategist who has conducted public opinion studies for national corporations, foundations, elected leaders of the U.S. Senate, U.S. House of Representatives and state governments. He served as a Senior Strategist for Senator John McCain's Straight Talk America political action committee and for the Senator's 2008 presidential campaign. Tarrance had previously been involved in the U.S. presidential campaigns of Barry Goldwater, Richard Nixon, Ronald Reagan, John Connally, Jack Kemp, and George H. W. Bush. In 2013, he was inducted into the American Association of Political Consultants' Hall of Fame for his career achievements.

== Public opinion research ==
Tarrance served as a member of the Board of Directors of The Gallup Organization (1987–1992), and first managing director and President of Gallup China in Beijing (1993–1995), and as a President and Founder of Tarrance & Associates, a Houston-based national survey research company (1977–1992). Tarrance & Associates conducted hundreds of public opinion studies for national corporations, foundations, elected leaders of the U.S. Senate, U.S. House of Representatives and state governments. His acknowledged professional pursuits have included a research model built on split ticket voting, a systems approach to populist-conservatism, and studies of emerging Hispanic and internet voters.

Following his involvement with the Gallup Organization, Tarrance was a partner and chairman of the Board of Tel Opinion Research, LLC, of Alexandria, Virginia.

Tarrance also served as managing director to Burson-Marsteller Public Affairs Practice in Washington D.C. Named one of the 150 people in the country influencing national government by National Journal, Tarrance has provided commentary in the New York Times, the CBS Morning News, ABC's Nightline, NBC's Today and FOX News.

He contributed to Florida State University's School of Communication Archive all of the Tarrance Company surveys in the southern states from 1978 to 1988 for historical purposes.

Tarrance served as the Special Assistant to the Director of the 1970 U.S. Census and was also named by the Secretary of Commerce as co-chairman of the Federal Advisory Committee on the adjustment of the 1990 Census. Earlier, he served as the Director of Research for the Republican National Committee and was an officer of the 1968 Republican National Convention. Tarrance has been selected as a member of "Who's Who in America" every year since 1990, and "Who's Who in the World" since 2008. Tarrance is also a co-founder of the Raleigh Tavern Philosophical Society of Texas.

In 2000, Tarrance was one of the principal architects behind two "watershed surveys" designed for the RNC to analyze Hispanic voters cultural and political attitudes. At the time, they were considered the most comprehensive surveys ever commissioned by any political party.

== Education ==
Tarrance received a B.A. in European History from Washington & Lee University in Lexington, Virginia, his master's degree with distinction in Electoral Behavior from American University in Washington D.C., and was a Fellow of Harvard Kennedy School, the Institute of Politics. He was a visiting professor at the Texas A&M Center for Presidential Studies for the 1995–1996 academic year, was appointed the 1996 Scholar in Residence at Washington & Lee University.

Tarrance has trekked over many of the world's mountain ranges including East Asia, the Pacific Rim, Africa, and South America. Tarrance has hiked over diverse terrain in Iceland and Tanzania, the Japanese Alps, the Spanish Pyrenees, the Canadian Rockies and the Himalayas of Nepal. He has also climbed the mountain peaks of Kilimanjaro, Mount Fuji, and the Hotaka mountain range and sailed down the river systems of the Nile, the Yangtze, the Colorado River, and the Usumacinta. In addition to his recreational experiences hiking, climbing, and sailing around the world, Tarrance has also spent time in the Galapagos, Marrakesh, Kyoto, Machu Picchu, Auckland, Istanbul, Chongqing, Cairo, Tikal, and the Great Barrier Reef.

== Publications ==
- "Texas Precinct Votes," (1966, 1968, 1970), University of Texas Press.

== Co-authored publications ==
- The Ticket Splitter; A New Force in American Politics, (1972). Co-author: Walter DeVries Eerdmans Press.

"Devries and Tarrance, scholars who have worked in the political hedge rows, have brilliantly destroyed generations of conventional wisdom about how America votes…The Ticket Splitter has opened up new vistas and political research techniques and election strategies." (Jim Perry, The National Observer)

- Checked and Balanced: How Ticket Splitters are Shaping the New Balance of Power in American Politics (1998), Co-Author: Walter DeVries Eerdmans Press.

"The reading of history and of the polls that Tarrance and DeVries offer is certainly a plausible one. And it comes from scholars who have been right far more often than they have been wrong gauging the pattern of American politics….It is a bold analysis…but given the prescience of the earlier volume, their view is not one to be dismissed." (David S. Broder, The Washington Post)

- How Republicans Can Win in a Changing America: The Art of War with Lesson Plans (2013)
