= Kerr Scott Farm =

Historic farm in North Carolina, United States

- U.S. National Register of Historic Places
- Location within North Carolina Location within the United States
- Nearest city: N and S side of SR 2123, near Haw River, North Carolina
- Coordinates: 36°03′33″N 79°21′00″W
- Area: 243 acres (98 ha)
- Built: 1919
- NRHP reference No.: 87001850
- Added to NRHP: October 31, 1987

Kerr Scott Farm, also known as Melville, is a historic home and farm located near Haw River, Alamance County, North Carolina. The vernacular farmhouse was built in 1919, and consists of a 1 1/2-story, frame, center hall plan, hip-roofed main block, with a one-story frame gable-roofed ell built about 1860. The property includes a variety of contributing outbuildings including a farm office (c. 1920s), milk house (c. 1920s), woodshed (c. 1930s), dairy barns (1910, 1929 and 1941), equipment building / machine shop (1941), cow shed (c. 1940s), gas / oil house (c. 1940s), corn crib (1910), silos, and cow sheds. It was the home of North Carolina governor and United States Senator, W. Kerr Scott (1896-1958) and the birthplace of W. Kerr Scott's son, also a former North Carolina governor, Robert W. Scott.

It was added to the National Register of Historic Places in 1987.
