= Wilbur Hobby =

American labor unionist

Wilbur Hobby (November 8, 1925 – May 9, 1992) was an American labor unionist. He was the president of the North Carolina chapter of the American Federation of Labor – Congress of Industrial Organizations (AFL-CIO) from 1969 to 1981. Hobby also was active in North Carolina politics, running unsuccessfully for the Democratic nomination for Governor in 1972.

Hobby strove to provide security and stability to the working lives of ordinary people, something he never had as a child. He used politics as a means to this end, but he entered the field at a time when segregationist forces were still very strong in the South. Hobby attempted to counter this by promoting a populist message that crossed racial lines that he hoped would become part of mainstream political conversation in North Carolina. However, his career ended in scandal with a conviction on felony corruption charges in 1981.

== Early life, education, and service ==
Wilbur Hobby was born in Durham in 1925, the son of a bricklayer and a cleaning lady who divorced when he was eight years old. The family struggled to make ends meet throughout most of his childhood. Sometimes, he had to skip school to pick up free groceries for the family, which included four brothers. Hobby moved more than twenty times, usually within the blue-collar Edgemont section of Durham. His father abandoned the family when he was seven or eight years old.

Hobby dropped out of school in the ninth grade. He then worked various odd jobs, including as the Durham Bulls first uniformed batboy. For a brief period of time, he moved to Dayton to work as a trainer for a minor league baseball team, the Dayton Ducks.

Hobby returned to Durham in 1942. He stated that "[t]he war was going on and November rolled around and I became seventeen and so I threatened to kill myself if my mother didn't sign for me to get into the navy". Hobby served in the South Pacific. His ship participated in the retaking of the Philippines. Hobby also saw action near China before he was discharged in 1946. His oldest brother, however, did not survive the war; he was killed in Saint-Lô, France, in 1944.

== Labor career ==
=== Early years at American Tobacco ===
Hobby returned to Durham in 1946. He took a job at the American Tobacco Company's plant in Durham as a machine oiler for 75 cents per hour and joined the Tobacco Workers International Union without much thought. In fact, Hobby had developed some anti-labor sentiments during the war, viewing workers who went on strike as selfish while soldiers risked their lives defending the right to strike.

Hobby credits a specific instance during a night shift as changing his attitude towards unions. His tasks suddenly were split onto two floors instead of just one, making it extremely difficult to get everything required done in the allotted time. When he asked a friend what to do about the situation, Hobby was referred to their union representative. A day later, all was back to normal, and Hobby had discovered how a union could provide security and stability in the workplace. He went to the next meeting simply to express his gratitude, and he guessed that he ended up going to every successive one for the next fifteen years.

Hobby's interest in the union was duly noted, and he was soon elected president of the plant's night shift. Hobby's tenure was short-lived, however, because he was called back into the U.S. Navy in 1950 during the Korean War. He served for 18 months. During this time period, Hobby's opinion on racial issues began to take on their mature form. During the Korean War, Blacks were not required to eat at separate tables from whites (President Truman legally desegregated the armed forces in 1948). Despite his expectations of an awful experience, Hobby decided to sit with two Blacks one day. Reflecting back on the experience years later, Hobby said, "I was visibly surprised when I didn't feel any physical pain. I was … twenty-five years old and expecting physical pain just because I sat down and ate with them".

=== Rise to power ===
Upon his return to Durham, Hobby decided to enroll at Duke University, where he studied political science and labor economics. He combined this with his old job at the tobacco plant and also became the editor of the Durham Labor Journal, a pro-union publication. Feeling overworked, Hobby dropped out of Duke a semester short of graduation in 1955.

This aided Hobby's rise in the labor movement. Already well-versed in the North Carolina political scene, Hobby was appointed Southern political director of the Textile Workers Union of America in 1958, and became director of the AFL-CIO Committee on Political Education (COPE) for the seven southern states of Alabama, Florida, Georgia, Kentucky, North Carolina, South Carolina, and West Virginia (comprising Area 3) only one year later. Hobby spent the 1960s organizing the spread of unions in the South and promoting AFL-CIO-endorsed candidates for public office. He also strove to become president of the North Carolina chapter of the AFL-CIO, and was successful on his fourth attempt in 1969. Hobby considered the previous president, Milton Barbee, too timid to lead the organization into the future.

== Political career ==
The overarching theme of Hobby's career in politics was to advance populist causes and the position of labor. He served in a variety of roles to make this possible, with his interest in politics becoming evident by the late 1940s.

=== Early years at Voters for a Better Government (VBG) ===
Hobby's first union leadership position at the American Tobacco Company's local plant was his stepping stone into politics. He was elected president of Voters for a Better Government (VBG), an officially non-partisan, but Democratic-leaning, Durham-based organization in 1949. Uniting liberal academics from Duke University and North Carolina Central University with laborers of all races, VBG helped elect the progressive Dan Edwards as Mayor of Durham. Hobby became part of the Durham County Democratic Party power structure, and he soon involved VBG in the 1950 Senate race, which pitted conservative Democratic candidate Willis Smith against Frank Graham, the former president of the University of North Carolina, who had been appointed to the position. Smith won with a campaign that characterized Graham as pro-integration and as likely pro-communist.

Hobby was frustrated by the obvious racial undertones of the loss and concluded he had to work harder to develop a message that would unite, not split, white labor and Blacks. VBG's efforts to register more Blacks increased under his leadership, with Hobby working with Dan Martin, a Black political organizer to try to end the Jim Crow system that prevented Blacks from exercising their rights as citizens.

=== Director of Committee on Political Education (COPE) ===
Hobby continually ran into the same racial issues in politics, particularly when he served as southern director of the AFL-CIO's Committee on Political Education (COPE) from 1958 to 1969. The Durham United Political Education Committee (DUPEC) allied with conservative businesspeople to eliminate Hobby's and his allies' control of the Democratic Party. DUPEC accused Hobby of "selling their jobs to the NAACP".

Throughout North Carolina, white unionists flocked to segregationist gubernatorial candidate I. Beverly Lake in the 1960 election, and many supported Alabama Governor George Wallace in the 1960 and 1964 Presidential elections. Hobby used his position at COPE to fight back against the segregationists, rallying support around candidates including Al Gore Sr. in Tennessee and Claude Pepper in Florida. He also spearheaded the AFL-CIO's endorsement of the Civil Rights Act of 1964 in the South, a position that initially ran counter to many of the candidates he backed. Hobby said, quite bluntly, "Civil rights are not [just] Negro rights. Civil rights are the human rights of every citizen".

=== 1972 gubernatorial campaign ===
Over the course of a quarter century, Hobby developed a number of political allies, and forged relationships with a unique cross-section of the population. In 1972, he became the first union leader to run for governor in North Carolina history. Hobby knew he was an underdog, and hoped to use his candidacy to bring his populist viewpoints into mainstream political conversation. His campaign slogan was "Let's Keep the Big Boys Honest".

==== Platform and political positions ====
===== Taxes and income inequality =====
A champion of the underprivileged, Hobby felt that relative tax rates were unjust and bad for the middle and lower classes. He believed that enough revenue was collected to create a useful pool of government services, but the wealthy were paying too little and the poor too much for them to have any meaningful impact on people's lives. He argued that setting the amount of state taxes due as a progressive proportion of the federal income rate owed would rectify the situation. Hobby also opposed existing sales taxes on food and medicine, which he thought unfairly targeted the least fortunate.

===== Education =====
Hobby called for expanded vocational programs for North Carolina's students, but opposed those who wished to technically train students from the very beginning of their educational careers. He felt that the purpose of the education system was to produce well-rounded individuals and capable citizens. He also wished to help more of North Carolina's students obtain at least some college training by having the state of North Carolina match pre-existing federal funds for community colleges, a plan that was not popular at a time when more than half of the state's high school graduates went on to no further schooling.

===== Housing =====
North Carolina provided one of the lowest qualities of life for its citizens of any state in the early 1970s. Twenty percent of residences were classified as having inadequate plumbing or being overcrowded, with far more substandard by other measures. Hobby's political agenda in this area was complicated by the fact that three quarters of these housing units were located in rural areas. Hobby wanted to increase the amount of funding for projects in cities, too, so there was no single solution. His goal was to create a third path for impoverished rural folks that did not involve accepting a substandard status quo or being forced into cities.

===== Vietnam and women's rights =====
Hobby's liberalism was evident in his views on a host of other foreign and domestic policy issues. He opposed the war in Vietnam, called out Blue Shield and Blue Cross for their extreme rate hikes, and supported the Equal Rights Amendment (ERA), which passed Congress the year of his campaign (1972). Despite the initial opposition of the AFL-CIO, Hobby helped push the organization to reverse its stance on the ERA, which it did publicly in 1973.

==== Campaign ====
Hobby could not overcome his late start, lack of funding, and policy views that were to the left of what was a conservative electorate, even in a Democratic primary. He tried to organize debates, but his campaign was not important enough for other candidates to feel the need to reciprocate. One illuminating event involved a speech on the state capitol grounds about a week before the election. Labor was expected to bus in thousands of supporters, but only 250 people attended. Even with the small crowd, Hobby gave a blistering speech about the issues plaguing the little guy in North Carolina politics. He came in last in the primary with 7% of the vote, and the only municipality he won was Chapel Hill. However, his candidacy did help cause a runoff between the two frontrunners, Hargrove Bowles and Pat Taylor. Hobby also maintained that his cause helped the unions, bringing attention to the workers' issues in an anti-union state.

== Decline and felony conviction ==
What ultimately brought down Wilbur Hobby was not electoral defeat; it was the criminal justice system. There were some early warning signs that Hobby did not always play by the rules: during the first day of his gubernatorial campaign he pledged to not accept donations of more than $200 from any group, but he took in $10,000 from the AFL-CIO the next day. Hobby's opponents also accused him of spending too much on himself as AFL-CIO President, leading a lavish lifestyle while not truly representing the workers.

Hobby's executive career came to a sudden end in 1981. Using connections with new, union-friendly governor Jim Hunt, Hobby secured $1,000,000 in funding for job training programs under the federal Comprehensive Employment and Training Act (CETA) between 1977 and 1979. Hobby initially got funds awarded to Precision Graphics, a printing company he headed. Hobby and his business partner, Mort Levi, recognized the need for computers at the union and hoped to cut out the middleman by founding Precision Data together in early 1979. Precision Data proceeded to purchase several expensive computers with multi-year payment plans. Despite having no substantive capital, employees, or history as a company, Precision Data, under Hobby's direction, applied for a CETA contract to help train women to gain data skills. The board in charge of approving such contracts met the application with skepticism, and instead decided to award it to Precision Graphics, who they felt were better equipped to use the funds. Suddenly in financial trouble, Precision Data began leasing its computers to Precision Graphics for hefty fees. Over the course of the next few months, it became apparent that funds were being intentionally diverted from Precision Graphics to Precision Data, most notably a $28,000 payment for "transportation of students" that never occurred.

A year later, state and federal audits that found substantial funds unaccounted for (around $34,000). This led to indictments for Hobby and Levi for defrauding the federal government. The two were convicted at trial. Hobby served a year in jail and paid a $40,000 fine. He also lost his position as North Carolina AFL-CIO President.

== Final years and legacy ==
Upon his release, Hobby returned to the same machine-oiling job at American Tobacco that he occupied 35 years earlier. He remained there until his retirement in 1986. Hobby was bedridden for about 4 years before his death on May 9, 1992 at the Durham Veterans' Affairs Hospital after a long illness, involving a weak heart and lungs due to his obesity and diabetes.

Though his personal political endeavors were unsuccessful and his career ended ignominiously, Hobby was an important figure in North Carolina's post-World War II era. He was a champion of the underprivileged, be they laborers or Blacks, and he tried to bring their struggles to the public's attention.
