= The Paradox of Tar Heel Politics =

2008 book

- Author: Rob Christensen
- Genre: Non-fiction
- Published: 2008
- Publisher: University of North Carolina Press

The Paradox of Tar Heel Politics: The Personalities, Elections, and Events That Shaped Modern North Carolina is a book by Rob Christensen.

== Synopsis ==
The book covers the complex history of North Carolina from the Reconstruction era to the modern day, including the impact of racial politics, populism, civil rights, and workers' unions.

== Background ==
The book was Christensen's first publication written solely by him. It was published by University of North Carolina Press.

== Reception ==
Jack Betts, writing for The Charlotte Observer, called the book "outstanding". Dierdre Sinnott of Foreword Reviews wrote that "Christensen thoroughly covers his topic and lets the North Carolina high-office seekers reflect the mass organizing that occurred for civil rights, union rights, and education throughout the country."

It won the Ragan Old North State Award for Nonfiction at the 2008 North Carolina Book Awards.
