= Walter DeVries =

American political consultant (1929–2019)

- Born: Walter Dale DeVries; November 13, 1929; Holland, Michigan, U.S.
- Died: November 27, 2019 (aged 90)
- Education: Hope College (BA); Michigan State University (MA, PhD)
- Occupations: Political consultant; author
- Spouse: Lois Cook (m. 1950)
- Children: 4

Walter Dale de Vries (November 13, 1929 – November 27, 2019) was an American political consultant, author, and founder of the North Carolina Institute of Political Leadership.

Writing in 1972, Andrew M. Greeley remarked that "Walter DeVries and Lance Tarrance Jr. have apparently pinpointed a change which exists in the real world apart from the 'Op-Ed' page of the New York Times. If party identification has not changed much, 'ticket-splitting' has. In 1944 there were 41 Congressional districts that voted for one party for the Presidency and another for the House of Representatives. In 1956 there were 130 such districts; in 1964, 145... From 1914 to 1962 there was only one year when there were more than six states which elected a Senator from one party and a Governor from another... Since 1962 the average number of 'incongruences' has been eleven per year..."

== Biography ==
Walt de Vries was born in Holland, Michigan, in 1929. He was the oldest of seven sons of Dutch immigrants. He enlisted in the 2nd Armored Division of the U.S. Army (1948–49) and was recalled to active duty as an Intelligence NCO with the Army Security Agency in Korea (1950–51).

He later received a B.A. from Hope College in 1954. He then went on to earn an M.A. and Ph.D. in political science and social psychology from Michigan State University in 1955 and in 1960, respectively.

De Vries became director of research & strategy in George Romney's three successful campaigns for governor (1962, 1964 & 1966) and in his presidential campaign during 1967, but he resigned that position in November 1967. He also served as Romney's executive assistant in the administration of the Michigan state government from 1962 to 1967.

From 1969 to 1972 professor of political science at the University of Michigan.

From 1973 to 1979 he was an associate professor in the Institute of Policy Sciences and Public Affairs at Duke University.

In 1981 he was appointed an adjunct professor at the University of North Carolina Wilmington.

From 1969 through 1987 de Vries was the president of de Vries & Associates, Inc., a public relations, polling, media production, and campaign consulting firm. His company conducted more than 350,000 in-the-home and telephone surveys with registered voters for political, commercial, governmental and media clients. He has served as a campaign consultant to presidential, U.S. Senate, gubernatorial, congressional, state legislative and referendum campaigns in 35 states and several countries. He served on the Wrightsville Beach Planning Board from 2011 to 2013.

De Vries wrote and produced for television from 1960 until his death. His business, de Vries and Associates, Inc., has written and produced full-length documentaries, mini-documentaries, special telecasts, PSA's and commercials for public television, commercial television, cable networks, and satellite systems.

== Personal life ==
Walter de Vries met Lois Cook while still in high school. They were married in September 1950, when de Vries was subsequently recalled for military duty in Korea. They have four sons: Michael Dale (1952), Robert Cook (1953), Steven Richard (1957), and Walter Dann (1962).

De Vries, an avid sailor and also longing to be near the ocean, moved the family from Michigan to Marblehead, Massachusetts, and then ultimately south to the coastal town of Wrightsville Beach, North Carolina, in 1972.

== Works ==
- The Ticket-Splitter: A New Force in American Politics 1972 Foreword by: David S. Broder Co-Author: V. Lance Tarrance Jr.
- The Transformation of Southern Politics 1976 Co-Author: Jack Bass. David S. Broder of The Washington Post said the book was a "compelling story with insights on every page." Tom Wicker of The New York Times called it "definitive".
- Checked and Balanced: How Ticket-Splitters are Shaping the New Balance of Power in American Politics 1998 Co-Author: V. Lance Tarrance. Everett. C. Ladd of the Roper Center for Public Opinion said that Tarrance and De Vries "continue their leading work in this major new book—essential reading for all who want to understand the evolution of American politics."

== Founder/member ==
- Delegate to Michigan Constitutional Convention to rewrite the Michigan Constitution. (1962)
- Fellow of the Institute of Politics in the Kennedy School of Government at Harvard University. (1968–69)
- Co-founder and member of the American Association of Political Consultants (1969).

From the AAPC website:

The creation of political consultation as a separate career discipline has been a development of the middle 20th Century. As with most of politics, there is disagreement over when the "industry" began. Some call the California firms of Baus and Ross or Whittaker-Baxter, back in the 1930s, the founders of the field. Others credit people like Joe Napolitan, Clif White, Matt Reese, Bill Roberts, Stu Spencer, Joe Cerrell, Bill Hamilton, Bob Squier, Walter de Vries and their peers as the first "true" political consultants. These political pioneers date back to the 50s.

- Founder – North Carolina Institute of Political Leadership (1987)

In January 1989, de Vries was appointed the executive director of the N.C.I.P.L. The purpose of the program is to improve the quality of political leadership in North Carolina at the state and local levels. Each year, two classes of twenty Fellows—with outstanding leadership potential—are selected by the Institute's Board, and they spend ten weekends in a training program designed to make them familiar with the state's political and policy processes and campaign techniques. Over 1,500 Fellows have graduated from the Institute's hands-on program and serve in elective and appointive political and governmental positions. Dr. de Vries retired as IOPL Director in July 2004.
Since 1991, the North Carolina Institute of Political Leadership has helped start similar programs in Massachusetts, Michigan, Virginia, Ecuador, and South Africa.

== Awards ==
- Young Man of the Year Award (Grand Rapids Junior Chamber of Commerce) (1962)
- Order of the Long Leaf Pine Award (1998) one of North Carolina's highest honors, by Governor James B. Hunt Jr.
- Lifetime Achievement Award (2010) North Carolina Institute of Political Leadership.
