= Herbert Clifton Blue =

American politician (1910–1990)

H. Clifton Blue
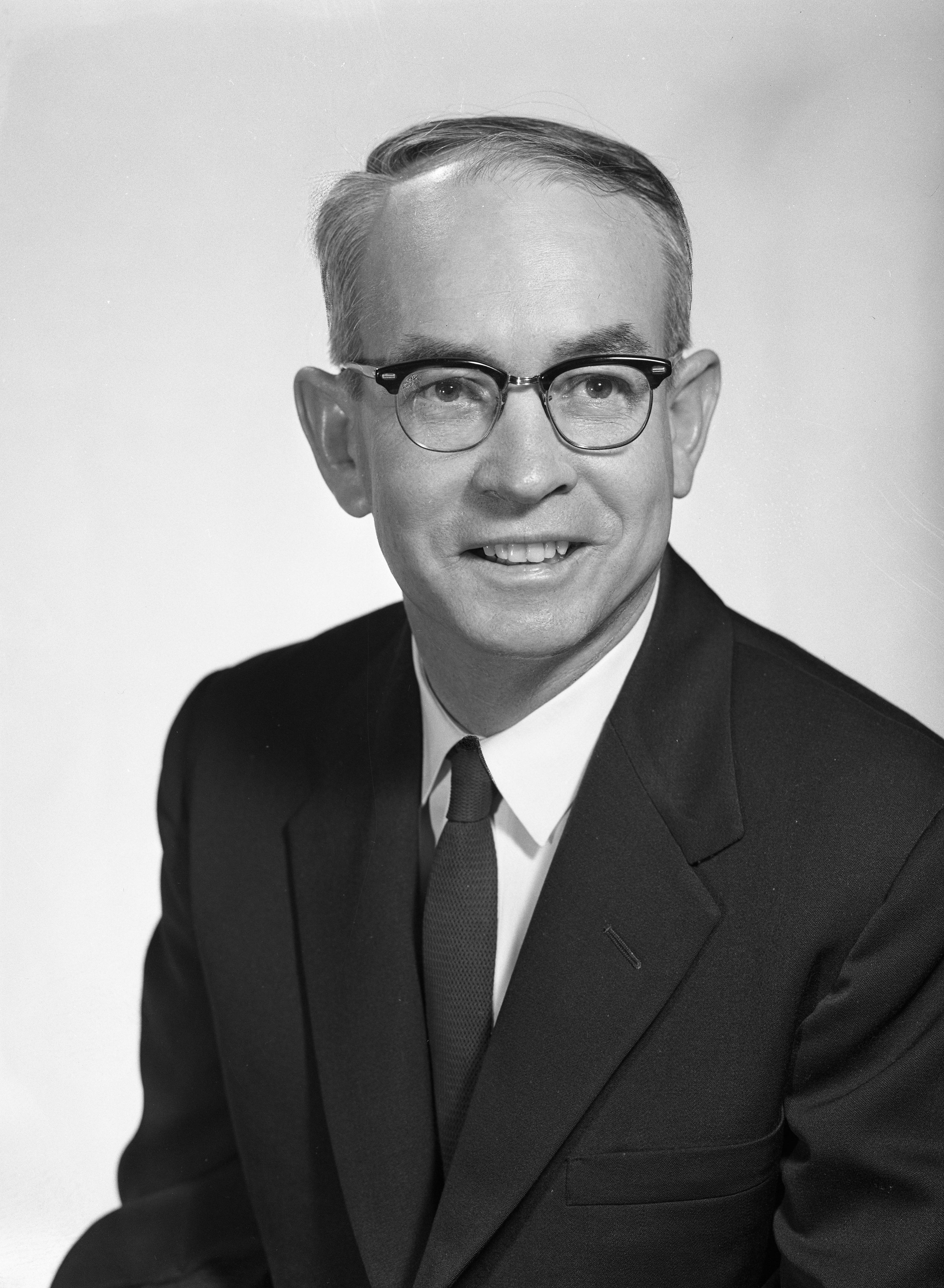
- Official portrait, 1959

Speaker of the North Carolina House of Representatives
- In office 1963–1964
- Preceded by: Joseph M. Hunt Jr.
- Succeeded by: Pat Taylor

Member of the North Carolina House of Representatives from Moore County
- In office November 5, 1946 – November 3, 1964
- Preceded by: Wilbur Hoke Currie
- Succeeded by: T. Clyde Auman

Personal details
- Born: August 28, 1910
- Died: March 10, 1990 (aged 79) Pinehurst, North Carolina
- Party: Democratic

Herbert Clifton "Cliff" Blue (August 28, 1910 – March 10, 1990) was an American newspaper editor, publisher, owner and politician.

== Life and career ==
Blue was born to John Patrick Blue and Christian Stewart Blue in Moore County, North Carolina, on August 28, 1910. He served nine terms in the North Carolina General Assembly after first being elected in 1947, and as Speaker of the House during the 1963 session. He died on March 10, 1990, in Pinehurst, North Carolina. A portion of U.S. Route 1 in Aberdeen, North Carolina, close to his former home has been dedicated as H. Clifton Blue Memorial Highway in honor of his contributions to the region.
