= 1984 North Carolina lieutenant gubernatorial election =

- November 6, 1984
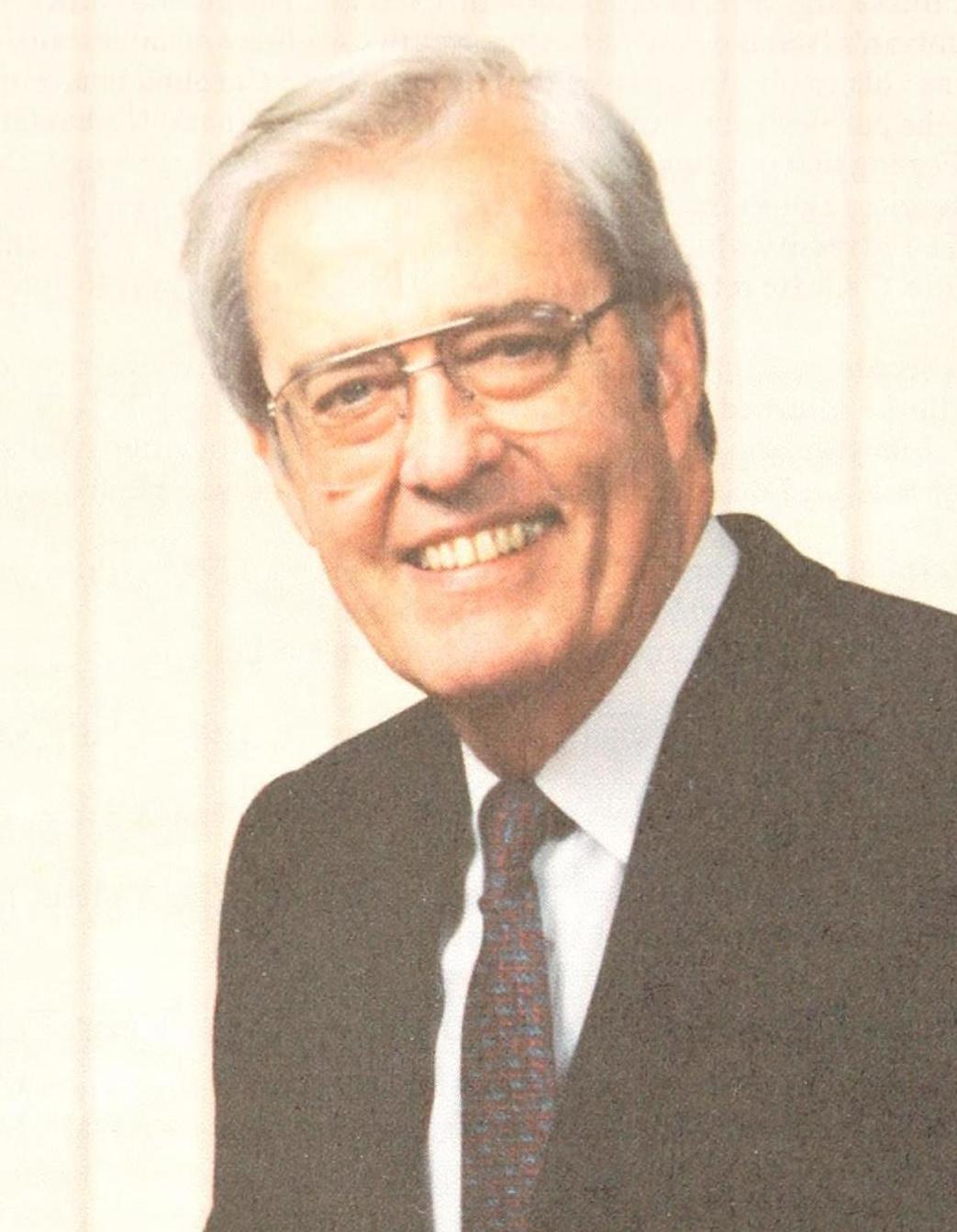

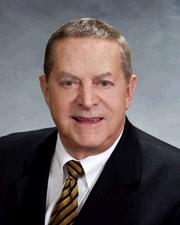
Nominee	Robert B. Jordan	John H. Carrington
Party	Democratic	Republican
Popular vote	1,149,214	990,728
Percentage	53.70%	46.30%
- County results Jordan: 50–60% 60–70% 70–80% Carrington: 50–60% 60–70% 70–80%
Lieutenant Governor before election
James C. Green
Democratic
Elected Lieutenant Governor
Robert B. Jordan
Democratic

The 1984 North Carolina lieutenant gubernatorial election was held on November 6, 1984. Democratic nominee Robert B. Jordan defeated Republican nominee John H. Carrington with 53.70% of the vote.

== Primary elections ==
Primary elections were held on May 8, 1984.

=== Democratic primary ===
==== Candidates ====
- Robert B. Jordan, State Senator
- Carl J. Stewart Jr., former Speaker of the North Carolina House of Representatives
- Stephen S. Miller

==== Results ====
Democratic primary results
Party	Candidate	Votes	%
Democratic	Robert B. Jordan	450,487	51.13
Democratic	Carl J. Stewart Jr.	393,018	44.61
Democratic	Stephen S. Miller	37,573	4.26
Total votes		881,078	100.00

=== Republican primary ===
==== Candidates ====
- John H. Carrington, businessman
- Frank Jordan
- William S. Hiatt, former State Representative
- Barbara S. Perry
- Erick P. Little

==== Results ====
Republican primary results
Party	Candidate	Votes	%
Republican	Frank Jordan	40,257	30.80
Republican	John H. Carrington	35,106	26.86
Republican	William S. Hiatt	27,600	21.11
Republican	Barbara S. Perry	24,355	18.63
Republican	Erick P. Little	3,406	2.61
Total votes		130,724	100.00

Republican primary runoff results
Party	Candidate	Votes	%
Republican	John H. Carrington	23,648	57.47
Republican	Frank Jordan	17,502	42.53
Total votes		41,150	100.00

== General election ==
=== Candidates ===
- Robert B. Jordan, Democratic
- John H. Carrington, Republican

=== Results ===
1984 North Carolina lieutenant gubernatorial election
Party	Candidate	Votes	%	±%
Democratic	Robert B. Jordan	1,149,214	53.70%	
Republican	John H. Carrington	990,728	46.30%	
Majority		158,486		
Turnout				
Democratic hold		Swing		
