= William Hiatt =

William Hiatt may refer to:

- William R. Hiatt (1950–2020), American cardiologist
- William S. Hiatt, American politician from North Carolina
