= 1976 North Carolina lieutenant gubernatorial election =

- November 2, 1976
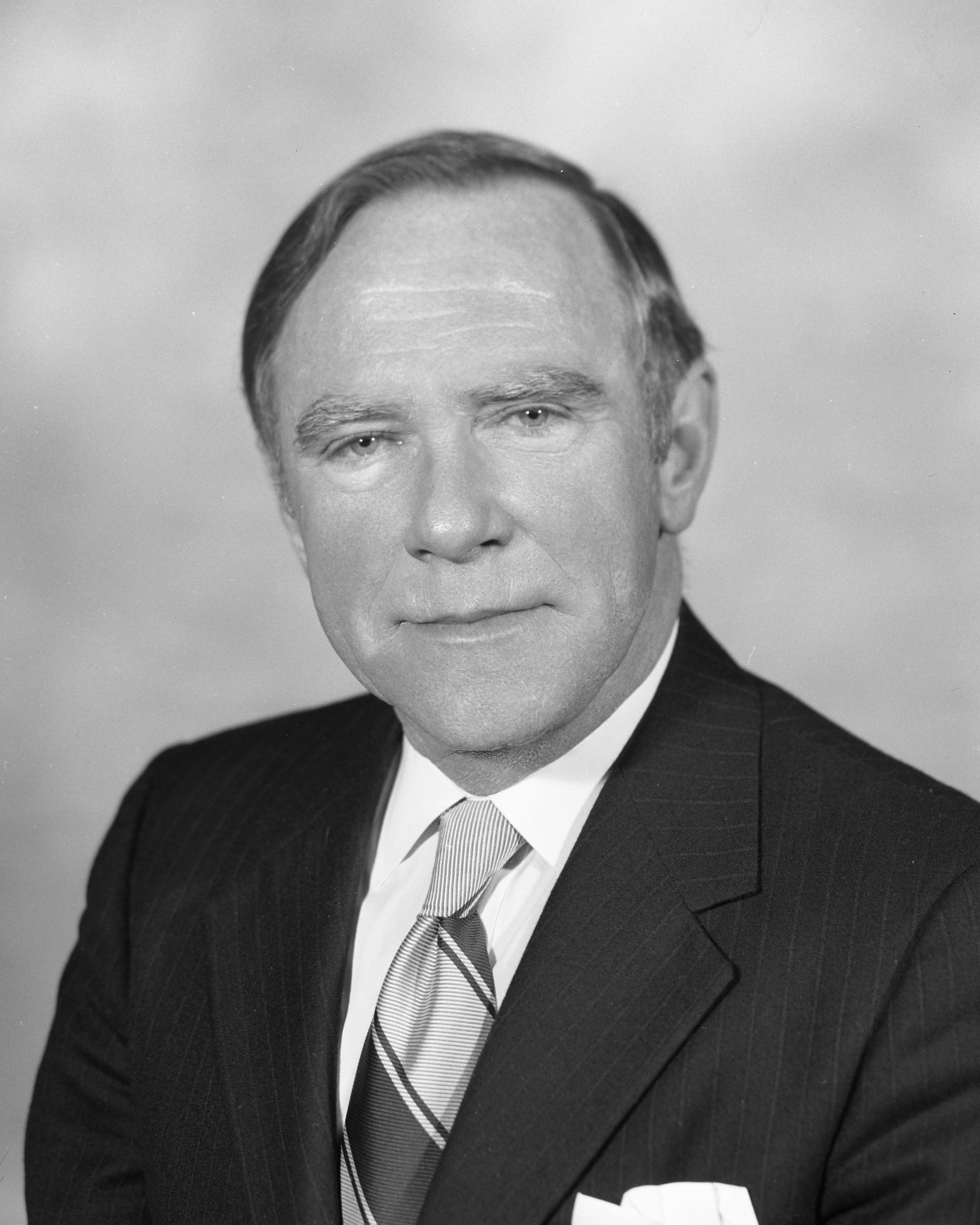

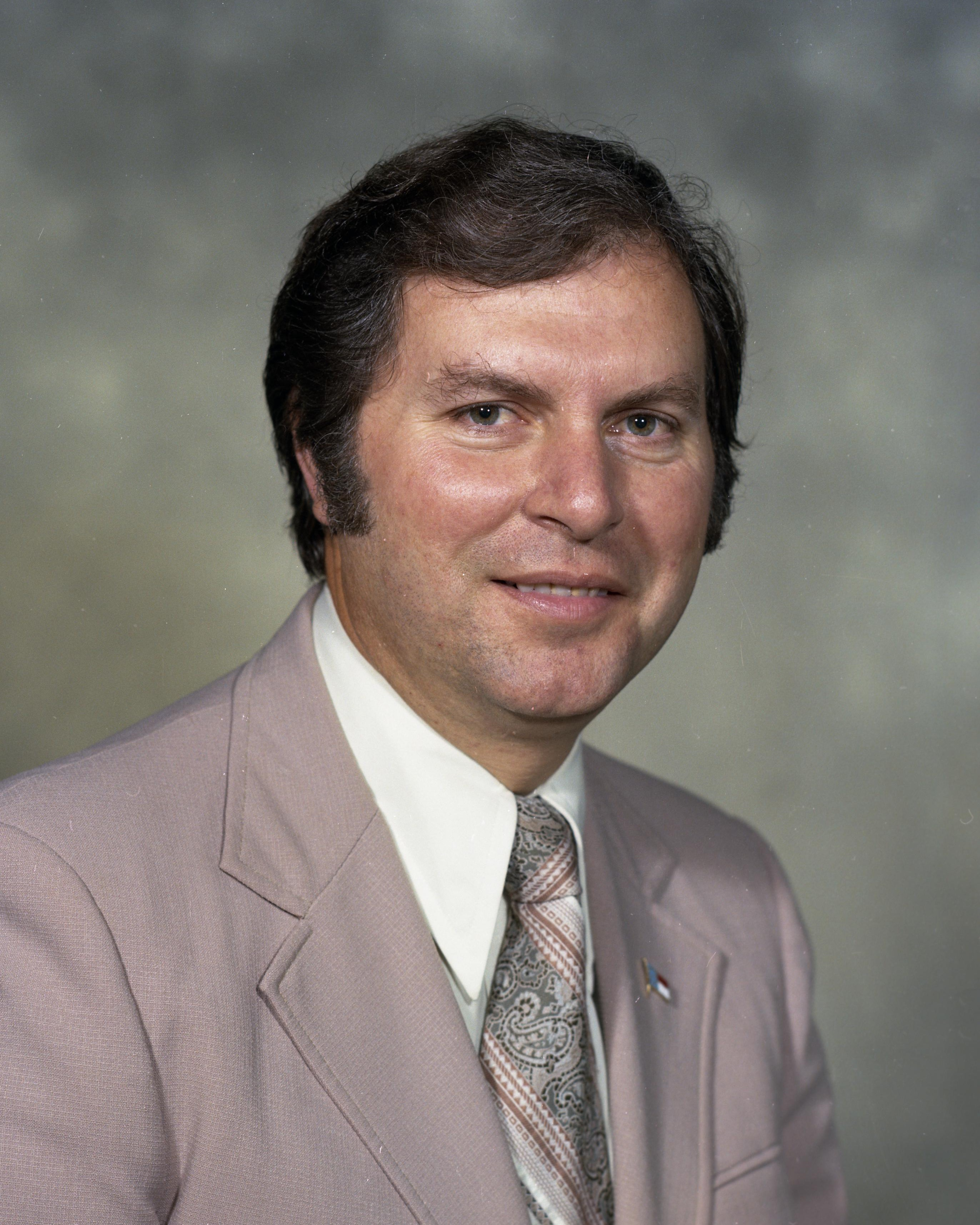
Nominee	James C. Green	William S. Hiatt
Party	Democratic	Republican
Popular vote	1,033,198	521,923
Percentage	66.04%	33.36%
- County results Green: 50–60% 60–70% 70–80% 80–90% >90% Hiatt: 50–60% 60–70%
Lieutenant Governor before election
Jim Hunt
Democratic
Elected Lieutenant Governor
James C. Green
Democratic

The 1976 North Carolina lieutenant gubernatorial election was held on November 2, 1976. Democratic nominee James C. Green defeated Republican nominee William S. Hiatt with 66.04% of the vote.

== Primary elections ==
Primary elections were held on August 17, 1976.

=== Democratic primary ===
==== Candidates ====
- James C. Green, Speaker of the North Carolina House of Representatives
- Howard Nathaniel Lee, former Mayor of Chapel Hill
- John M. Jordan, State Representative
- Waverly F. Akins, former Wake County Commissioner
- Herbert L. Hyde, State Representative
- Kathryne M. McRacken
- C.A. Brown Jr.
- E. Frank Stephenson Jr.

==== Results ====
Democratic primary results
Party	Candidate	Votes	%
Democratic	Howard Nathaniel Lee	177,091	27.71
Democratic	James C. Green	174,764	27.35
Democratic	John M. Jordan	89,959	14.08
Democratic	Waverly F. Akins	75,647	11.84
Democratic	Herbert L. Hyde	58,775	9.20
Democratic	Kathryne M. McRacken	25,926	4.06
Democratic	C.A. Brown Jr.	23,078	3.61
Democratic	E. Frank Stephenson Jr.	13,833	2.17
Total votes		639,073	100.00

Democratic primary runoff results
Party	Candidate	Votes	%
Democratic	James C. Green	292,362	56.06
Democratic	Howard Nathaniel Lee	229,195	43.94
Total votes		521,557	100.00

=== Republican primary ===
==== Candidates ====
- William S. Hiatt, former State Representative
- R. Odell Payne, former State Representative

==== Results ====
Republican primary results
Party	Candidate	Votes	%
Republican	William S. Hiatt	61,830	61.85
Republican	R. Odell Payne	38,145	38.16
Total votes		99,975	100.00

== General election ==
=== Candidates ===
Major party candidates

- James C. Green, Democratic
- William S. Hiatt, Republican

Other candidates

- Arlis F. Pettyjohn, American

=== Results ===
1976 North Carolina lieutenant gubernatorial election
Party	Candidate	Votes	%	±%
Democratic	James C. Green	1,033,198	66.04%	
Republican	William S. Hiatt	521,923	33.36%	
American	Arlis F. Pettyjohn	9,152	0.59%	
Majority				
Turnout				
Democratic hold		Swing		
