= Robert B. Jordan =

American politician (1932–2020)

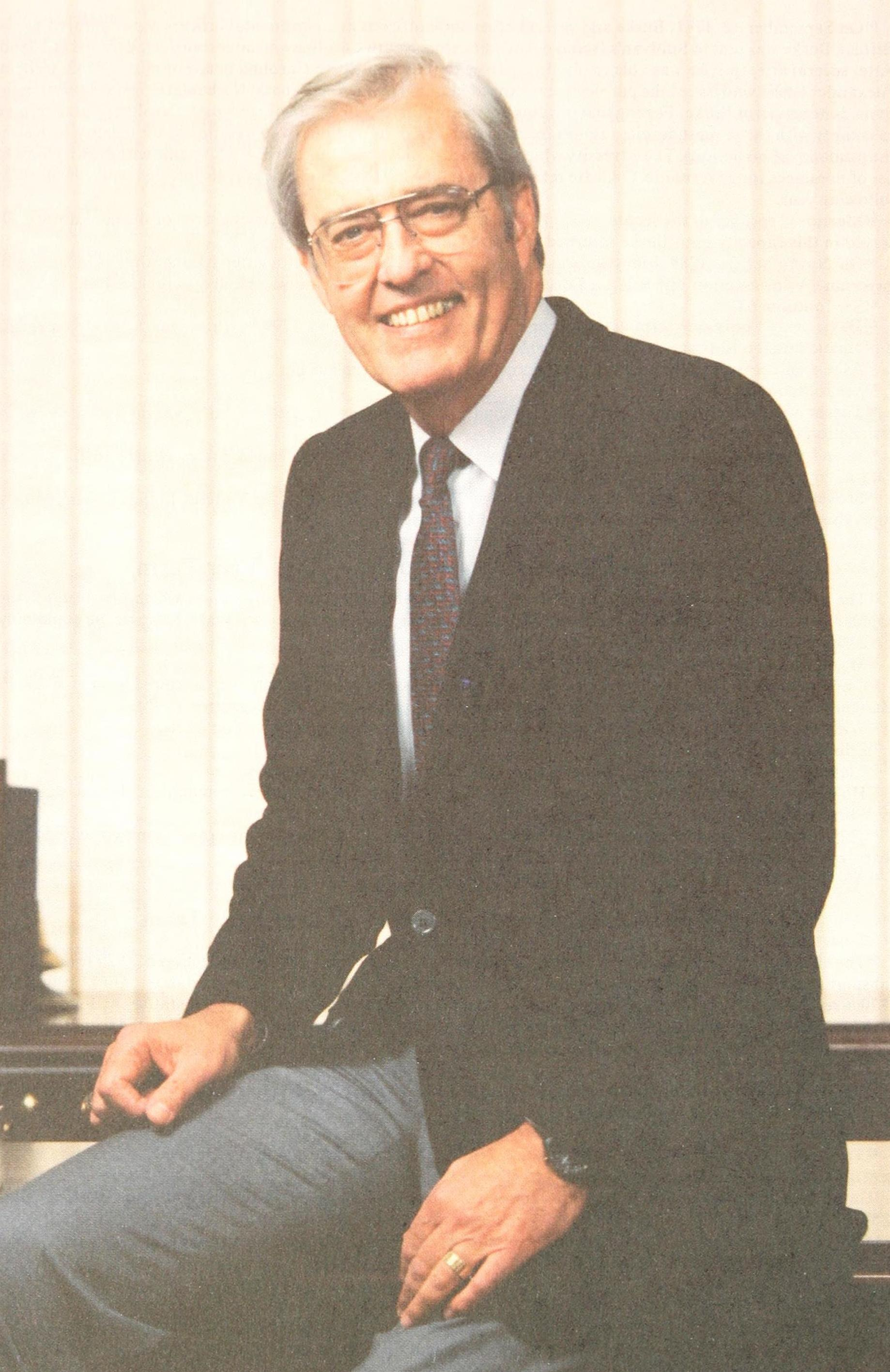

29th Lieutenant Governor of North Carolina
- In office January 5, 1985 – January 7, 1989
- Governor: James G. Martin
- Preceded by: James C. Green
- Succeeded by: Jim Gardner

Member of the North Carolina Senate from the 17th district
- In office January 1, 1977 – January 1, 1985
- Preceded by: Mary Odom
- Succeeded by: J. Richard Conder

Personal details
- Born: Robert Byrd Jordan III; October 11, 1932 Mount Gilead, North Carolina, U.S.
- Died: February 16, 2020 (aged 87) Mount Gilead, North Carolina, U.S.
- Party: Democratic
- Spouse: Sarah Cole
- Education: North Carolina State University (BS)

Military service
- Allegiance: United States
- Branch/service: United States Army
- Years of service: 1954–1956

Robert Byrd Jordan III (October 11, 1932 – February 16, 2020) was an American politician who served as the 29th Lieutenant Governor of North Carolina for one term (1985–1989) under Governor James G. Martin and who unsuccessfully ran for Governor of North Carolina in 1988.

Jordan, a native of Mount Gilead, North Carolina, graduated from North Carolina State University in 1954 with honors in forestry. Prior to being elected lieutenant governor, Jordan ran his family's lumber company and served in the North Carolina Senate as a Democrat from 1976 to 1984.

In 1984, he defeated state House Speaker Carl J. Stewart, Jr. in a hard-fought Democratic primary, then defeated Republican John H. Carrington in the general election to become North Carolina's 29th lieutenant governor. During his term, the lieutenant governor's official office was moved into the Hawkins-Hartness House.

He easily won the 1988 gubernatorial nomination but lost the general election to incumbent James G. Martin.

An advocate of education, Jordan has served on the North Carolina Board of Education, the state Board of Community Colleges, and the University of North Carolina System Board of Governors. On May 20, 2009, Jordan was elected chairman of the Trustees of North Carolina State University to serve the remaining term of McQueen Campbell, who resigned in conjunction with the investigation of Mike Easley.

Jordan Hall at North Carolina State University was named after his family.

Jordan died on February 16, 2020, at his home in Mount Gilead, North Carolina.

North Carolina Senate
Preceded by Mary Odom	Member of the North Carolina Senate from the 17th district 1977–1985; Served alongside: James Banks Garrison, Aaron Plyler	Succeeded by J. Richard Conder
Party political offices
Preceded by James C. Green	Democratic nominee for Lieutenant Governor of North Carolina; 1984	Succeeded by Tony Rand
Preceded by Rufus Edmisten	Democratic nominee for Governor of North Carolina; 1988	Succeeded by Jim Hunt
Political offices
Preceded by Jimmy Green	Lieutenant Governor of North Carolina; 1985-1989	Succeeded by Jim Gardner
