= 1980 North Carolina lieutenant gubernatorial election =

- November 4, 1980
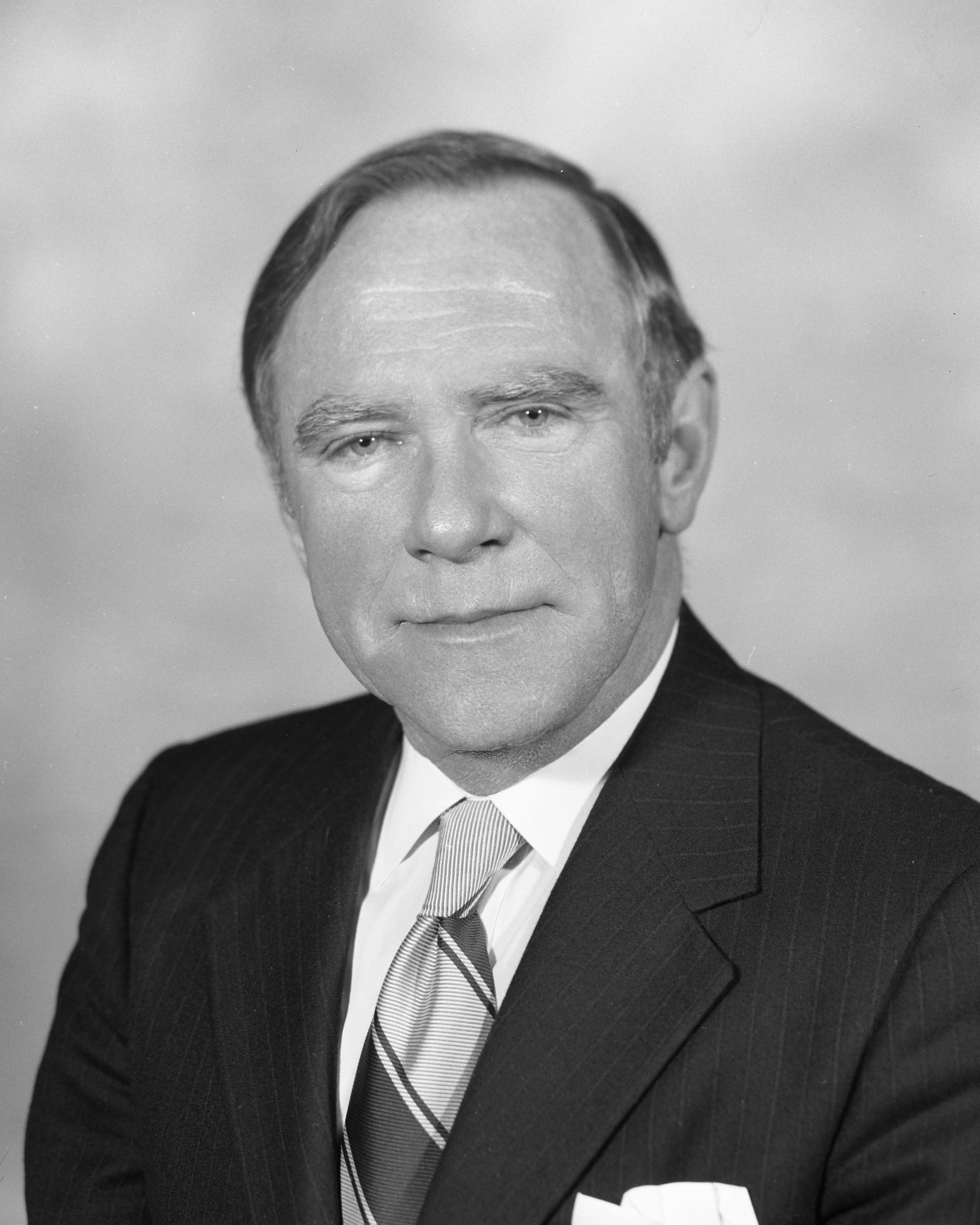

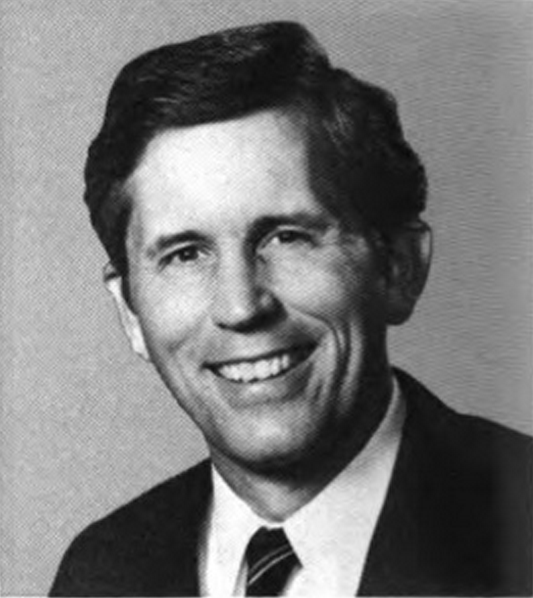
Nominee	James C. Green	Bill Cobey
Party	Democratic	Republican
Popular vote	942,549	814,082
Percentage	53.20%	45.95%
- County results Green: 50–60% 60–70% 70–80% 80–90% Cobey: 50–60% 60–70%
Lieutenant Governor before election
James C. Green
Democratic
Elected Lieutenant Governor
James C. Green
Democratic

The 1980 North Carolina lieutenant gubernatorial election was held on November 4, 1980. Democratic incumbent James C. Green defeated Republican nominee Bill Cobey with 53.20% of the vote.

== Primary elections ==
Primary elections were held on May 6, 1980.

=== Democratic primary ===
==== Candidates ====
- James C. Green, incumbent Lieutenant Governor
- Carl J. Stewart Jr., Speaker of the North Carolina House of Representatives
- Clyde Pulley

==== Results ====
Democratic primary results
Party	Candidate	Votes	%
Democratic	James C. Green (incumbent)	367,964	50.94
Democratic	Carl J. Stewart Jr.	341,257	47.24
Democratic	Clyde Pulley	13,192	1.83
Total votes		722,413	100.00

== General election ==
=== Candidates ===
Major party candidates

- James C. Green, Democratic
- Bill Cobey, Republican

Other candidates

- Craig Franklin, Libertarian

=== Results ===
1980 North Carolina lieutenant gubernatorial election
Party	Candidate	Votes	%	±%
Democratic	James C. Green (incumbent)	942,549	53.20%	
Republican	Bill Cobey	814,082	45.95%	
Libertarian	Craig Franklin	14,998	0.85%	
Majority		128,467		
Turnout				
Democratic hold		Swing		
