= E. J. Justice =

North Carolina politician

Edwin Judson Justice, sometimes noted as Edward Judson Justice, was a state legislator in North Carolina who served as Speaker of the North Carolina House of Representatives. His post office was in Greensboro.

In 1900 he was serving in the House from McDowell County, North Carolina and his post office was in Marion, North Carolina.

Governor Locke Craig appointed him to a railroad commission addressing freight rates in North Carolina's northern counties.

He served as Speaker of the North Carolina House of Representatives in 1907.

He introduced Booker T. Washington at a speaking event in Greensboro.
