= A. F. Hileman =

American politician

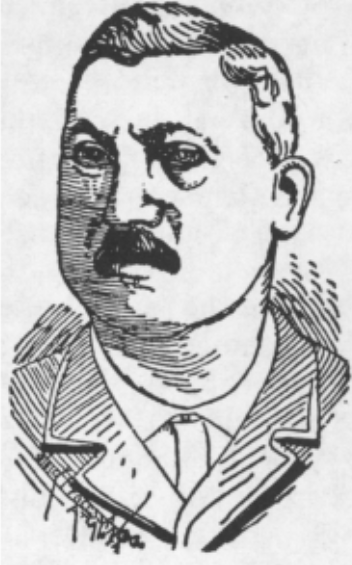
- Portrait of Hileman

Speaker of the North Carolina House of Representatives
- In office 1897–1898
- Preceded by: Zeb V. Walser
- Succeeded by: Henry G. Connor

Personal details
- Born: September 1, 1851 Cabarrus County, North Carolina
- Died: December 12, 1898 (aged 47) Cabarrus County, North Carolina
- Party: Populist
- Spouse: Lucy Cleodora • Alida J. Barrier
- Occupation: Politician

Ambrose Franklin Hileman (September 1, 1851 – December 12, 1898) was a politician from North Carolina. He served in the North Carolina General Assembly. He holds a unique place in the history of the state, as he was the only member of a third party to serve as Speaker of the North Carolina House of Representatives. He served as Speaker of the North Carolina House of Representatives.

== Political career ==
Hileman represented Cabarrus County, North Carolina in the House in the 1891, 1895, and 1897 sessions. During the 1897 session, he was elected Speaker by a fusion of Republicans and Populists which had won a majority in the state legislature during the 1896 elections. The 1896 elections also brought to power Gov. Daniel L. Russell and Lt. Gov. Charles A. Reynolds (both Republicans). As speaker, he oversaw the fusionist majority enact liberalized election laws which expanded voter turnout, laws enacted which expanded financial appropriations for schools, while also reestablishing county superintendents, and oversaw a law which established a direct election for the previously appointed office of Commissioner of Agriculture. The fusionists lost their majorities in the controversial 1898 legislative elections to the Democrats.

Political offices
Preceded by Zeb V. Walser (Republican)	Speaker of the North Carolina House of Representatives; 1897	Succeeded by Henry G. Connor (Democrat)
