= William S. Hiatt =

American politician (1932–2004)

Bill Hiatt
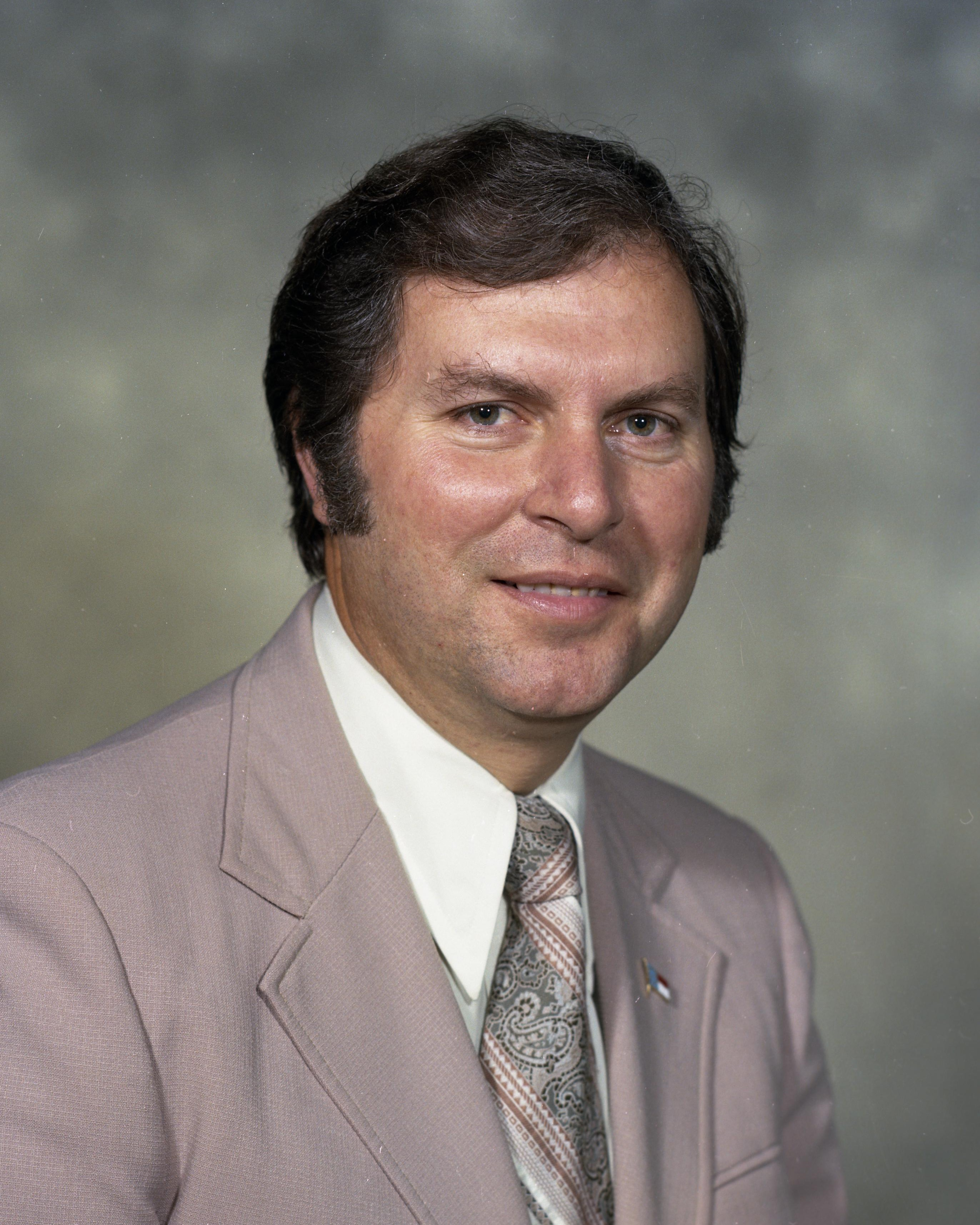
- Official portrait, 1973

Member of the North Carolina House of Representatives
- In office January 1, 1995 – January 1, 2003 Serving with Gene Wilson, Rex Baker
- Preceded by: Anderson Cromer; David Diamont; Wade Franklin Wilmoth
- Succeeded by: Rex Baker (Redistricting)
- Constituency: 40th District
- In office January 1, 1981 – January 1, 1983 Serving with Margaret Hayden, David Diamont
- Preceded by: P. C. Collins Jr. J. Worth Gentry
- Succeeded by: J. Worth Gentry (Redistricting)
- Constituency: 28th District
- In office January 1, 1973 – January 1, 1975 Serving with Clyde Greene, J. Marshall Hall
- Preceded by: P. C. Collins Jr. J. Worth Gentry; George Marion Jr. (Redistricting)
- Succeeded by: P. C. Collins Jr. J. Worth Gentry; David Diamont
- Constituency: 28th District

Commissioner of the North Carolina Division of Motor Vehicles
- In office January 1985 – November 1, 1990
- Governor: James G. Martin
- Preceded by: R. W. Wilkins Jr.
- Succeeded by: Wilma Sherrill

Personal details
- Born: William Seth Hiatt; February 15, 1932 Mount Airy, North Carolina, U.S.
- Died: September 7, 2004 (aged 72)
- Party: Republican
- Spouse: Rita Atkins (m. 1952)
- Children: 5
- Education: Brigham Young University
- Occupation: Teacher; politician

Military service
- Branch/service: United States Army
- Years of service: 1953–1955

William Seth Hiatt (February 15, 1932 – September 7, 2004) was an American politician.

While serving in the North Carolina House of Representatives, Hiatt resided in Mount Airy. In 1974, he proposed bills that would have limited sales of beer on Sundays, and near schools or churches. He contested the Republican nomination for the 1976 North Carolina lieutenant gubernatorial election, losing the office of lieutenant governor to Jimmy Green. He ran for the office a second time in 1984; the GOP named John Carrington its nominee.

Hiatt was a graduate of Brigham Young University. He married the former Rita Atkins on December 25, 1952, with whom he had 5 daughters.

== Recent electoral history ==
=== 2000 ===
North Carolina House of Representatives 40th district Republican primary election, 2000
Party	Candidate	Votes	%
Republican	William Hiatt (incumbent)	5,951	30.41%
Republican	Gene Wilson (incumbent)	5,317	27.17%
Republican	Rex Baker (incumbent)	4,798	24.52%
Republican	John Brady	1,928	9.85%
Republican	Larry Joseph Wood II	1,575	8.05%
Total votes		19,569	100%

North Carolina House of Representatives 40th district general election, 2000
Party	Candidate	Votes	%
Republican	William Hiatt (incumbent)	44,155	23.90%
Republican	Gene Wilson (incumbent)	42,337	22.92%
Republican	Rex Baker (incumbent)	42,110	22.79%
Democratic	Bert Wood	30,224	16.36%
Democratic	Daniel Hense	25,915	14.03%
Total votes		184,741	100%
Republican hold			
Republican hold			
Republican hold			

=== 1984 ===
North Carolina Lieutenant Gubernatorial Republican primary election, 1984
Party	Candidate	Votes	%
Republican	Frank Jordan	40,257	30.80%
Republican	John Carrington	35,106	26.86%
Republican	William Hiatt	27,600	21.11%
Republican	Barbara S. Perry	24,355	18.63%
Republican	Erick P. Little	3,406	2.61%
Total votes		130,724	100%

=== 1976 ===
North Carolina Lieutenant Gubernatorial Republican primary election, 1976
Party	Candidate	Votes	%
Republican	William Hiatt	61,830	61.85%
Republican	R. Odell Payne	38,145	38.16%
Total votes		99,975	100%

North Carolina Lieutenant Gubernatorial general election, 1976
Party	Candidate	Votes	%
Democratic	Jimmy Green	1,033,198	66.05%
Republican	William Hiatt	521,923	33.37%
American	Arlis F. Pettyjohn	9,152	0.59%
Total votes		1,564,273	100%
Democratic hold			

Party political offices
Preceded by John A. Walker	Republican nominee for Lieutenant Governor of North Carolina; 1976	Succeeded by Bill Cobey
Political offices
Preceded by R. W. Wilkins Jr.	Commissioner of the North Carolina Division of Motor Vehicles; 1985–1990	Succeeded by Wilma Sherrill
North Carolina House of Representatives
Preceded by T. Clyde Auman	Member of the North Carolina House of Representatives from the 28th district 1973–1975; Served alongside: Clyde Greene, J. Marshall Hall	Succeeded by P. C. Collins Jr. J. Worth Gentry; David Diamont
Preceded by P. C. Collins Jr. J. Worth Gentry	Member of the North Carolina House of Representatives from the 28th district 1981–1983; Served alongside: Margaret Hayden, David Diamont	Succeeded by Dorothy Burnley; Mary Jarrell
Preceded by Anderson Cromer; David Diamont; Wade Franklin Wilmoth	Member of the North Carolina House of Representatives from the 40th district 1995–2003; Served alongside: Gene Wilson, Rex Baker	Succeeded by Rick Eddins
