= Carl J. Stewart Jr. =

American politician (1936–2025)

Carl Jerome Stewart Jr. (October 2, 1936 – December 23, 2025) was an American politician who served as Speaker of the North Carolina House of Representatives for two terms between 1977 and 1980. He broke tradition by seeking a second term as Speaker, and since then, it has been customary for speakers to serve multiple terms.

== Life and career ==
Stewart attended Ashley High School, graduating in 1954. He received undergraduate and law degrees from Duke University where he was a member of the Duke University Debating Team. A resident of Gastonia and an attorney, Stewart served in the North Carolina House of Representatives from 1967 through 1980 representing the 38th District. In 1980, he ran unsuccessfully for Lieutenant Governor of North Carolina. He lost the Democratic primary to incumbent James C. Green. Stewart ran again in 1984 and lost the Democratic primary to Robert B. Jordan, III.

He served on the North Carolina Board of Transportation from 1981 until 1983. He was a member of the Economic Development Board and the North Carolina Board of Technology from 1999-2001. He was appointed the Chairman of the North Carolina State Ports Authority Board of Directors in 2004 by Gov. Mike Easley, and was re-appointed in 2010 by Gov. Bev Perdue before he resigned in 2012.

Stewart was appointed by the North Carolina House of Representatives to the State Ethics Commission in 2019.

Stewart died on December 23, 2025, at the age of 89.

Preceded by James C. Green	Speaker of the North Carolina House of Representatives; 1977–1980	Succeeded by Liston B. Ramsey
