= Rufus Yancey McAden =

American politician

Rufus Yancey McAden (1833–1889) was an American politician who served as Speaker of the North Carolina House of Representatives. McAden served in the North Carolina House of Commons from 1862 to 1867 including as Speaker of the House in 1866. He moved to Charlotte, North Carolina in 1867 and became president First National Bank that had been established two years prior.

In 1881, he built McAden Mills and the surrounding community of McAdenville in Gaston County, North Carolina. He was also involved in building the Atlantic & Charlotte Airline Railway that later absorbed into the Southern system. McAdenville, North Carolina is named for him.

He married Mary Terry McAden and they had children. His son Henry M. McAden (1872-1957) had a home at 920 Granville Road in Charlotte that was designed by Louis Asbury and completed in 1918. The landscaping was by Earle Sumner Draper.
