= Augustus Leazar =

Augustus Leazar (March 26, 1843 – February 18, 1905), sometimes documented as Augustus Leazer, was a farmer, educator, and politician in North Carolina.

== Education ==
He attended Davidson College. He opposed secession, but helped organize a company for the Confederate Army.

== Career ==
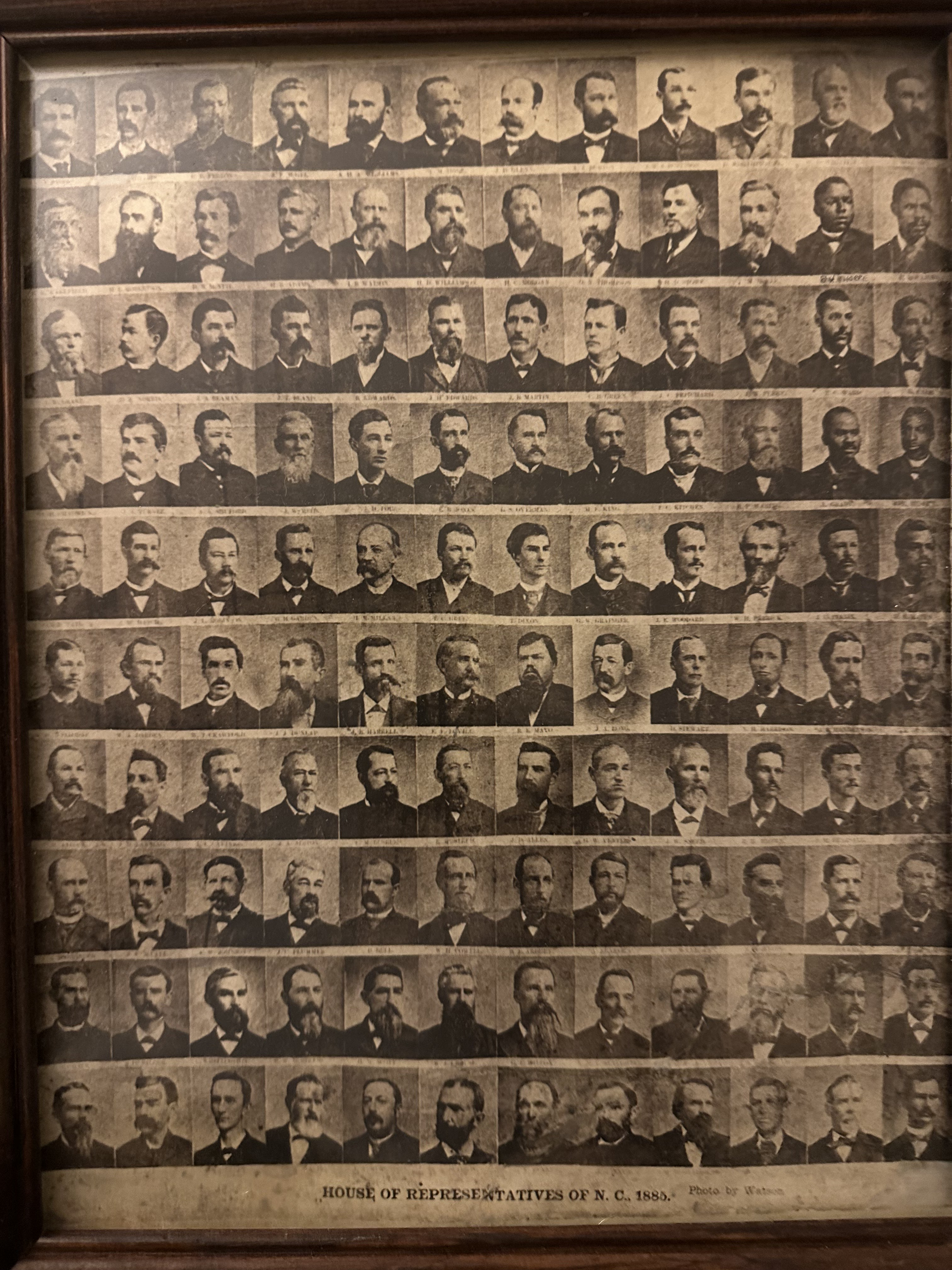
Members of the North Carolina House of Representatives in 1885.

He represented Iredell County in the North Carolina House of Representatives. A Democrat, he served four consecutive terms. He co-authored the bill to establish North Carolina Agricultural and Mechanic College (now North Carolina State University), in Raleigh, North Carolina. In 1889 he was elected Speaker of the North Carolina House of Representatives. He served as superintendent of the state penitentiary from 1893 to 1897.

== Legacy ==
A historical marker commemorates his life. Leazar Hall at NCSU is named for him.
