= James E. Ramsey =

American politician (1931–2013)

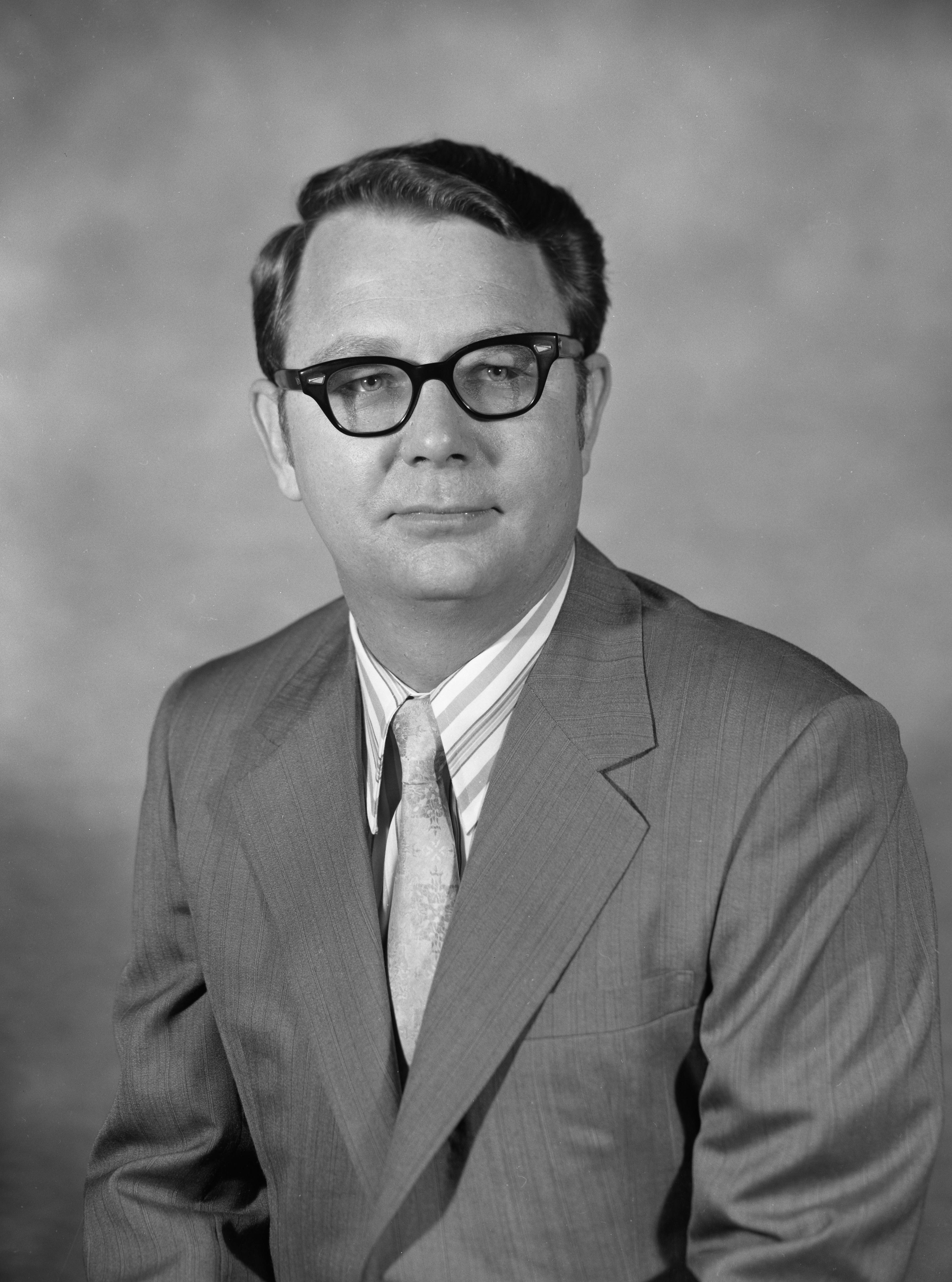
Ramsey c. 1971

James Edward Ramsey (October 19, 1931 – May 2, 2013) was an American politician and lawyer.

Born in Person County, North Carolina, Ramsey served in the United States Marine Corps. He received his bachelor's degree from the University of North Carolina at Chapel Hill and his law degree from University of North Carolina Law School. He practiced law. Ramsey served in the North Carolina House of Representatives, as a Democrat, and served as speaker in his final term (1973-1974). He ran for the U.S. House of Representatives in 1982 but was defeated in the Democratic primary by Mickey Michaux and Tim Valentine, who advanced to a runoff. Michaux was African-American, while Valentine and Ramsey were both white.

Ramsey was inducted into the Order of the Long Leaf Pine in 2012 and died the next year at age 81, in Roxboro, North Carolina.
