= 1988 North Carolina gubernatorial election =

- November 8, 1988
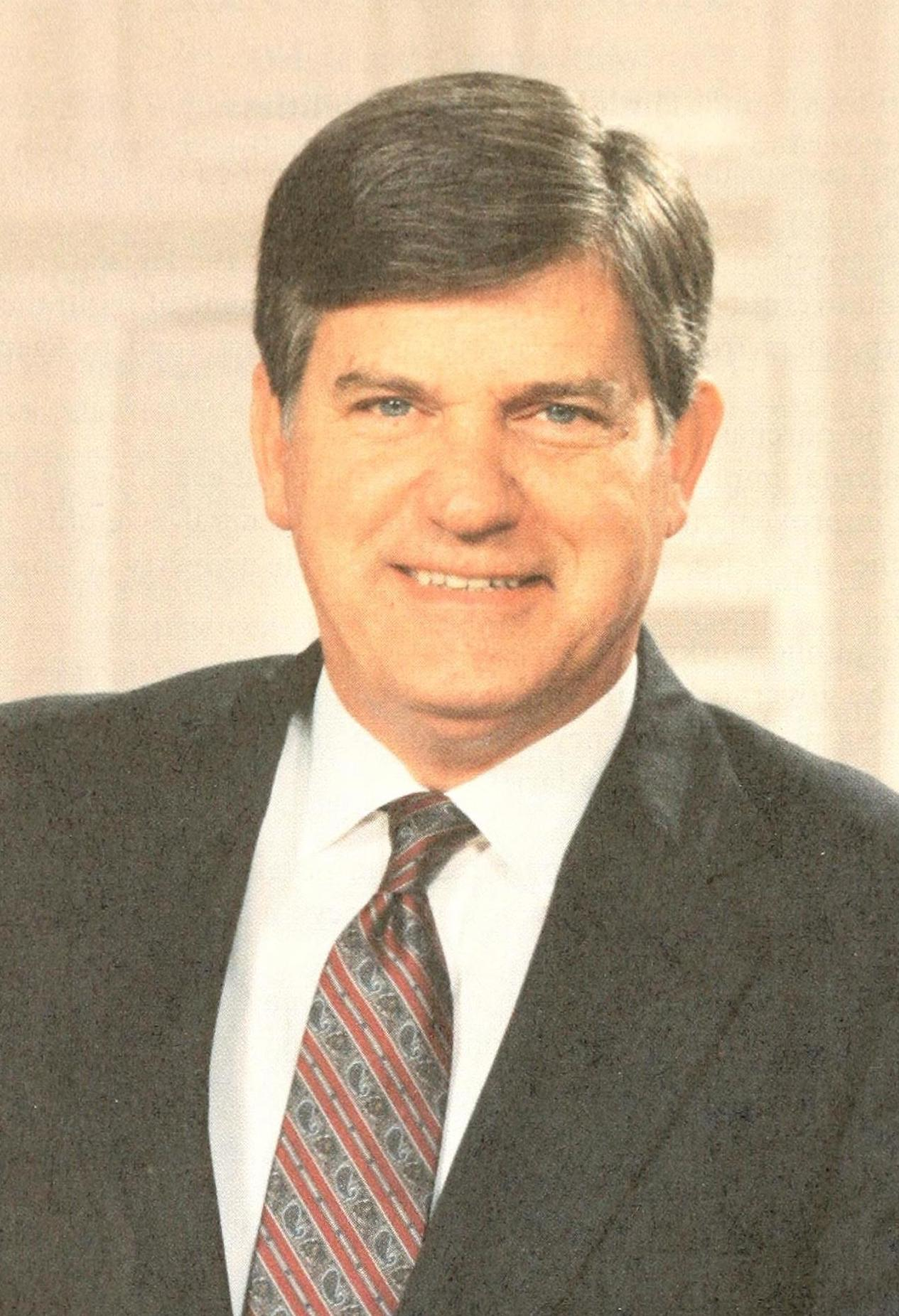

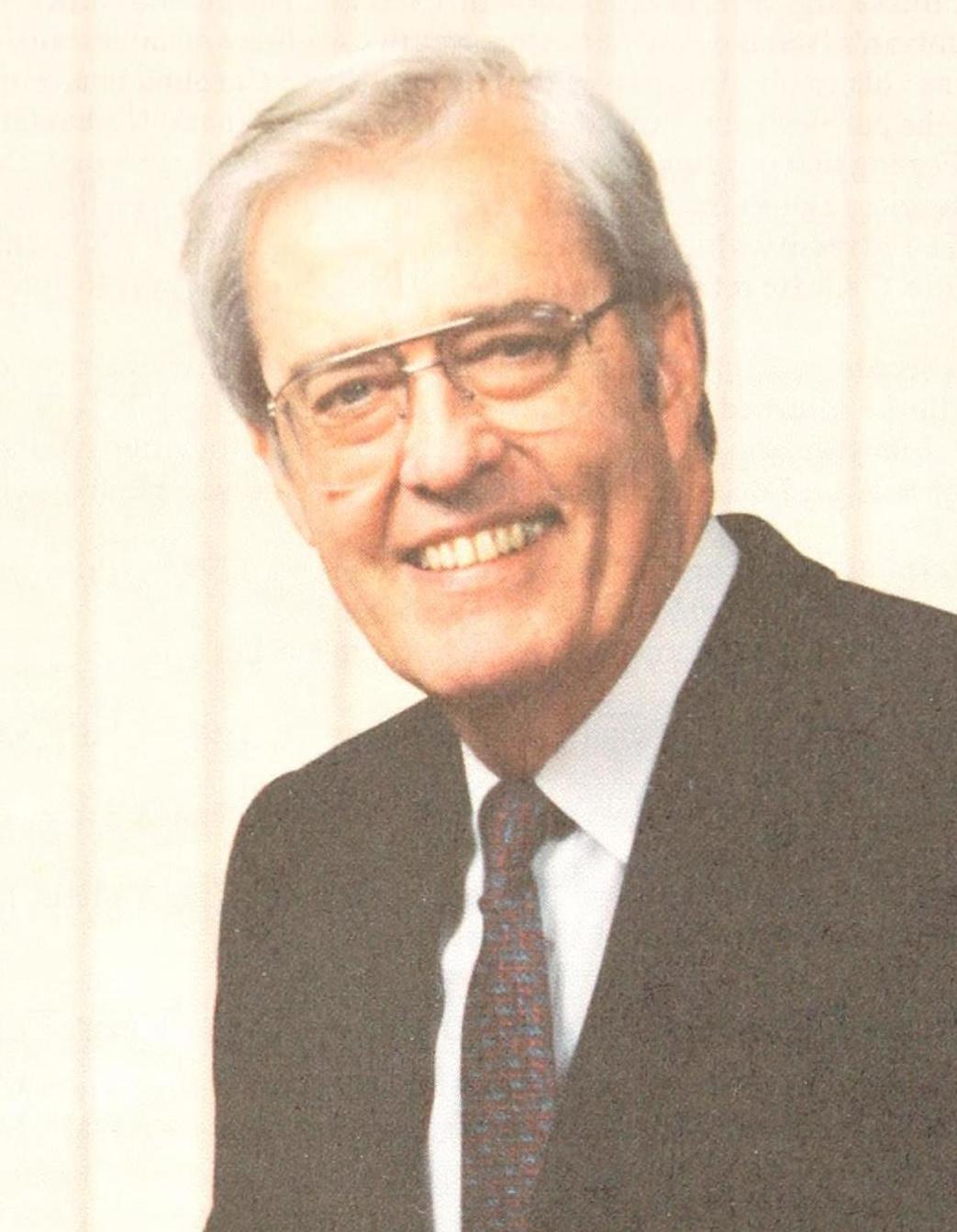
Nominee	James G. Martin	Robert B. Jordan
Party	Republican	Democratic
Popular vote	1,222,258	997,408
Percentage	55.06%	44.94%
- County results Martin: 50–60% 60–70% 70–80% Jordan: 50–60% 60–70% 70–80%
Governor before election
James Martin
Republican
Elected Governor
James Martin
Republican

The 1988 North Carolina gubernatorial election was held on November 8, 1988. Popular Incumbent Governor James G. Martin ran and was re-elected by a comfortable margin over Democratic Challenger former Lieutenant Governor Robert B. Jordan III. This was the penultimate time a Republican was elected Governor of North Carolina, with the last time being in 2012.

As of 2026, this is the only time that a Republican was re-elected to a second term as Governor of North Carolina. This is the second of two times where Republicans won consecutive gubernatorial elections, after 1868 and 1872. This also marks the last occasion that the following counties have voted Republican in a gubernatorial election: Buncombe, Guilford, and Wilson.

== Primary election results ==
1988 NC Governor Democratic Primary Election Results
Party	Candidate	Votes	%	±%
Democratic	Robert B. Jordan	404,620	79.20%	
Democratic	Billy Martin	60,770	11.97%	
Democratic	Carrol W. Crawford	21,884	4.30%	
Democratic	James Lloyd	10,438	2.06%	
Democratic	Bruce A. Friedman	9,876	1.95%	

== General election results ==
1988 NC Governor Election Results
Party	Candidate	Votes	%	±%
Republican	James G. Martin (incumbent)	1,222,258	55.06%	
Democratic	Robert B. Jordan	997,408	44.94%	−0.47%
Turnout		2,219,666	100.00%	
