= Owen Haywood Guion =

American politician and judge (1861–1925)

Speaker of the North Carolina House of Representatives
- In office 1905–1906

North Carolina House of Representatives
- In office 1903–1906

Personal details
- Born: June 21, 1861 New Bern, North Carolina, U.S.
- Died: September 19, 1925 (aged 64) Baltimore, Maryland, U.S.
- Resting place: Cedar Grove Cemetery, New Bern, North Carolina, U.S.
- Party: Democratic

Owen Haywood Guion (June 21, 1861 - September 19, 1925) was a state legislator and judge in North Carolina. He served as Speaker of the North Carolina House of Representatives.

== Biography ==
Guion was born June 21, 1861 in New Bern, where he lived for his whole life, to John Amos and Susan Roberts Guion.

Guion was elected to the North Carolina House of Representatives in 1902 for the 1903 session. He was elected in March 1903 to be a trustee of the State University to fill the position vacated by the death of W. T. McCarthy and serve the remaining term ending November 30, 1905.

Guion was re-elected to the North Carolina House of Representatives in 1904 for the 1905 session and was named as Speaker of the North Carolina House of Representatives January 3, 1905 by the Democrats that held 98 of the 120 seats.

In 1906 Judge Henry R. Bryan nominated Guion to replace him when he retired from the Mecklenburg County Superior court. Guion served on this court until he retired in 1920.

He died September 19, 1925 in hospital in Baltimore after a long illness. At the time of his death he was the oldest member of the New Bern bar. he was survived by his wife Pattie Rodman daughter of William B. Rodman Jr. as well as a daughter and three sons including Owen Haywood Guion Jr. He was buried in Cedar grove cemetery.
