= David Hunter Diamont =

American football coach and politician

David H. Diamont

Member of the North Carolina House of Representatives
- In office January 1, 1975 – January 1, 1995
- Preceded by: William S. Hiatt
- Succeeded by: William S. Hiatt
- Constituency: 28th district (1975–1983); 40th district (1983–1995)

Personal details
- Born: February 9, 1946 (age 80) Greensboro, North Carolina, U.S.
- Party: Democratic
- Education: Wake Forest University; Appalachian State University
- Occupation: Football coach

David Hunter Diamont (born February 9, 1946) is an American football coach and politician. He served as a Democratic member of the North Carolina House of Representatives.

== Life and career ==
Diamont was born in Greensboro, North Carolina. He attended East Surry High School, Frank L. Ashley High School, Wake Forest University and Appalachian State University.

In 1975, Diamont was elected to the North Carolina House of Representatives, serving for twenty years.

Diamont was an assistant football coach at Mount Airy Senior High School. He was also a coach at East Surry High School. He retired in 2018.
