= Mary H. Odom =

American politician

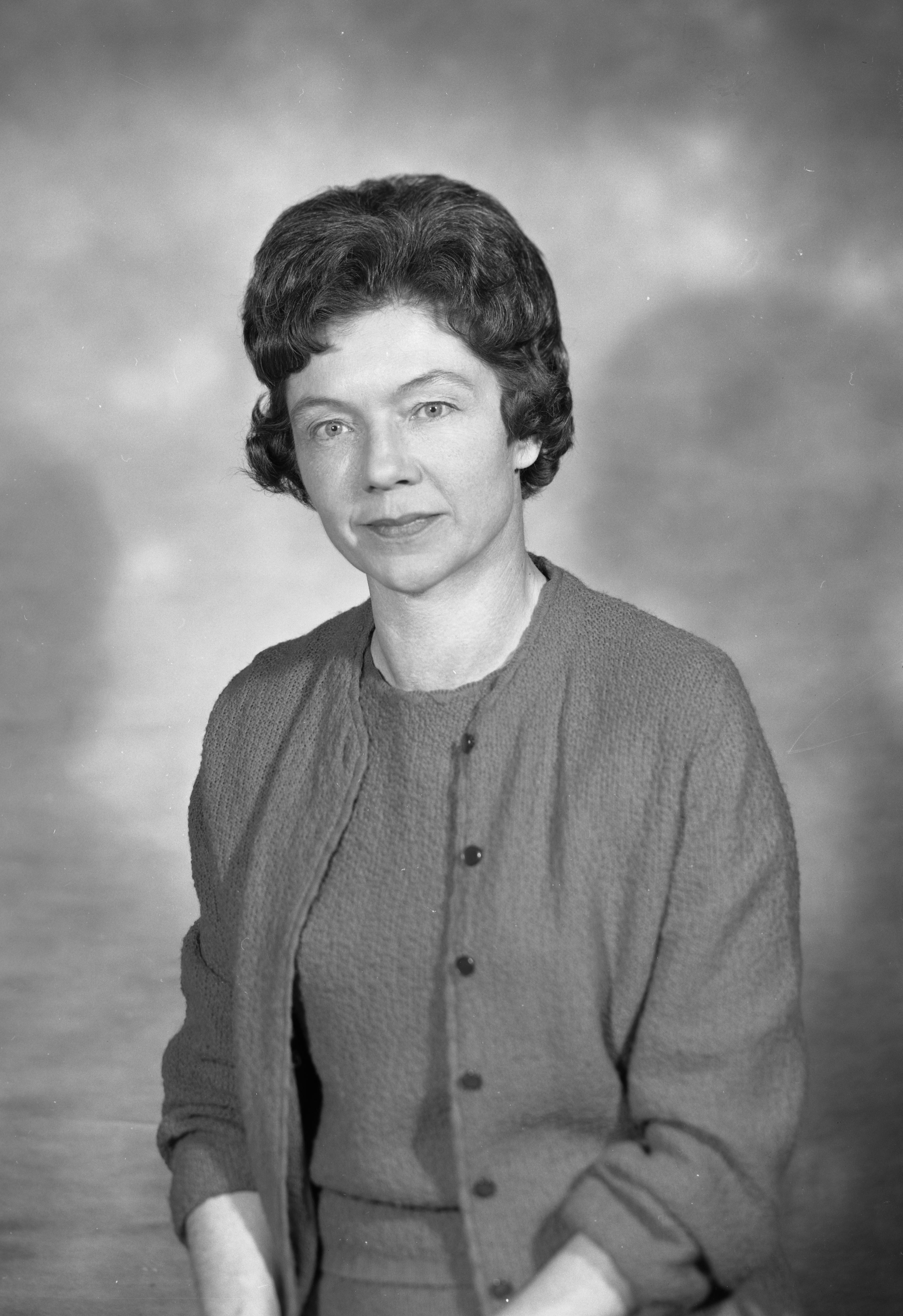
- Odom c. 1971

Personal details
- Born: January 29, 1921
- Died: November 22, 2014 (aged 93)
- Party: Democratic Party
- Education: East Carolina University and University of North Carolina at Chapel Hill
- Occupation: politician, postal worker
- Profession: politician, educator, journalist.

Mary Horne Odom (January 29, 1921 – November 22, 2014) was an American educator and politician.

== Early life and education ==
Born in Greenville, North Carolina, Odom graduated from Greenville High School and then received her bachelor's degree from what is now East Carolina University. Odom also went to University of North Carolina at Chapel Hill.

== Career ==
Odom was a high school teacher. Odom also worked for the United States Post Office and was a reporter for the Laurinburg Exchange. She lived in Wagram, North Carolina. Odom served in the North Carolina House of Representatives in 1971 and 1972 as a Democrat and then in the North Carolina State Senate in 1975 and 1976.

== Death ==
Odom died at the age of 93 in Raleigh, North Carolina.
