= William R. Hiatt =

American cardiologist (1950–2020)

William R. Hiatt (June 1, 1950 – December 8, 2020) was an American cardiologist.

William H. Hiatt was born in Albion, Indiana, on 19 December 1919, educated at Manchester College and the Loyola University School of Dentistry, and moved to Colorado to pursue a career in endodontics and periodontics. He died of cancer on 31 May 1993. Hiatt married Luana Read, with whom he had three children, including William R. Hiatt, who was born on 1 June 1950. William R. Hiatt graduated from Denver Country Day School in 1968, and studied English at Knox College, where he first met his wife Susan Wessels Hiatt. After completing his undergraduate degree in 1972, Hiatt enrolled at the University of Colorado School of Medicine until 1976. He successively held a residency at Boston University Hospital in internal medicine, followed by a fellowship in vascular medicine at the University of Colorado. Hiatt began teaching at the University of Colorado in 1981, and was later named Novartis Foundation Endowed Chair in Cardiovascular Research. Hiatt was associated with the EUCLID and VOYAGER clinical trials up to his death on 8 December 2020.

Hiatt's hobbies included mountain climbing, and he had climbed all 54 Colorado summits above 14,000 feet in elevation, as well as Mount Fuji, Mount Kilimanjaro, and Aconcagua.
