= James C. Green =

American politician

Jimmy Green
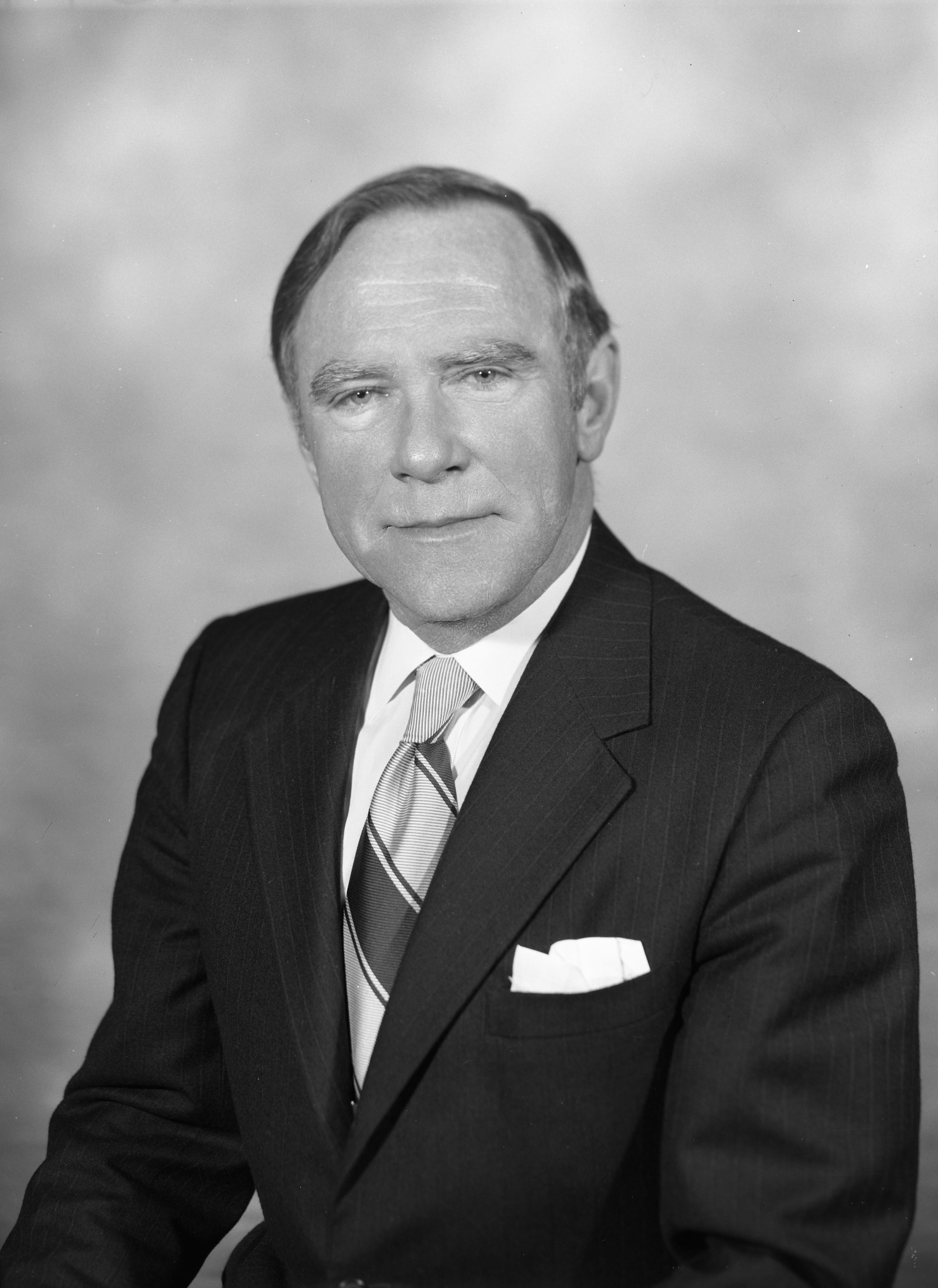
- Green circa 1971

28th Lieutenant Governor of North Carolina
- In office January 8, 1977 – January 5, 1985
- Governor: James B. Hunt, Jr.
- Preceded by: James B. Hunt, Jr.
- Succeeded by: Robert B. Jordan, III

Member of the North Carolina House of Representatives
- In office 1961–1976

136th Speaker of the North Carolina House of Representatives
- In office 1975–1976
- Preceded by: James E. Ramsey
- Succeeded by: Carl J. Stewart, Jr.

Personal details
- Born: James Collins Green; February 24, 1921 Halifax County, Virginia, U.S.
- Died: February 4, 2000 (aged 78) Elizabethtown, North Carolina, U.S.
- Resting place: Clarkton Cemetery, Clarkton, North Carolina
- Party: Democratic

James Collins "Jimmy" Green (February 24, 1921 – February 4, 2000) was an American politician who served as Speaker of the North Carolina House of Representatives (1975–1976) and as the 28th Lieutenant Governor of North Carolina (1977–1985).

== Political career ==
Green served in the North Carolina House of Representatives from 1961 through 1976. He was elected lieutenant governor in 1976 after defeating Howard Nathaniel Lee in a Democratic primary runoff. He was sworn in on January 8, 1977. In 1980, after a change to the Constitution of North Carolina, Green became the first lieutenant governor elected to a second term. He defeated fellow former House Speaker Carl J. Stewart, Jr. in the 1980 Democratic primary, and then went on to defeat Republican Bill Cobey in the general election.

Green was charged in 1983 with accepting a bribe from an undercover FBI agent, but he was acquitted. The next year, he ran for Governor of North Carolina but finished fifth in the Democratic primary behind Rufus Edmisten. Green then threw his support to the Republican nominee, Jim Martin, giving him critical backing among conservative Democrats in eastern North Carolina. Martin went on to win the election.

== Later life and death ==
He was convicted of income tax fraud in 1997 and was sentenced to 33 months of house arrest. The scandal was in connection with a multimillion-dollar tobacco fraud scheme.

He died in Bladen County hospital at Elizabethtown, North Carolina on February 4, 2000.

Party political offices
Preceded by Jim Hunt	Democratic nominee for Lieutenant Governor of North Carolina; 1976, 1980	Succeeded by Robert B. Jordan
Political offices
Preceded by James B. Hunt, Jr.	Lieutenant Governor of North Carolina; 1977-1985	Succeeded by Robert B. Jordan, III
