= Speaker of the North Carolina House of Representatives =

American state-level legislative presiding officer

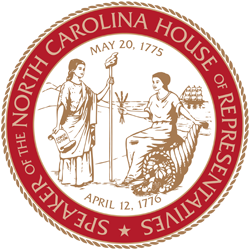
- Seal of the Speaker

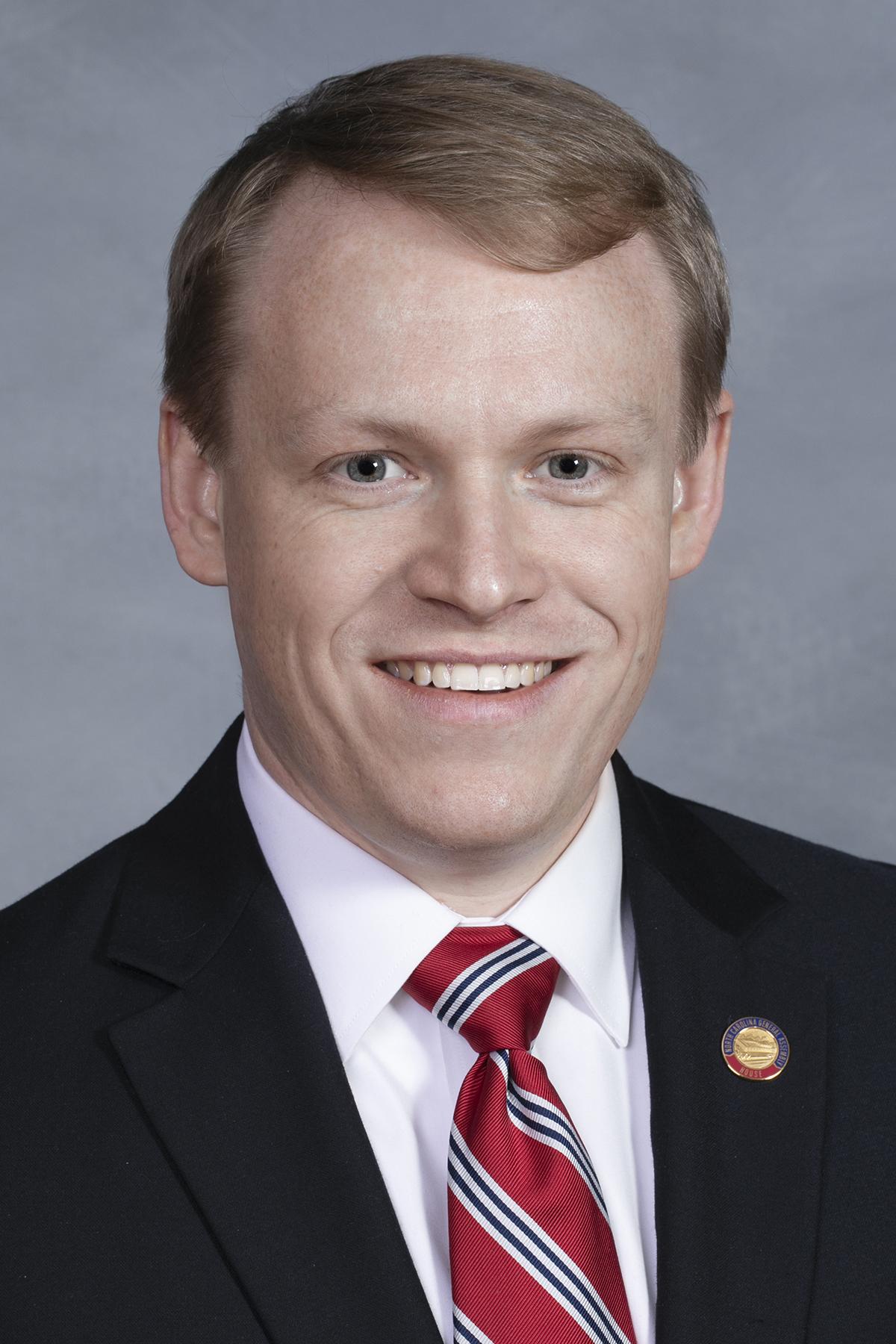
- Incumbent; Destin Hall since January 8, 2025
- Type: Speaker
- Formation: 1666
- First holder: George Catchmaid
- Succession: Third

The speaker of the North Carolina House of Representatives is the presiding officer of one of the houses of the North Carolina General Assembly. The speaker is elected by the members of the house when they first convene for their regular session, which is currently in January of each odd-numbered year. Perhaps the most important duty of the speaker is to appoint members and chairs of the various standing committees of the House.

== History of the office ==
The office evolved from the office of Speaker of the lower house of the legislature in the Province of Carolina, called the House of Burgesses. Since the House was the only elected body in the colony, the Speaker was often seen as the leading voice of the people. In 1776, North Carolina created its first constitution, which established a Senate and a House of Commons, both of which were elected by voters. In the 1868 North Carolina Constitution, the name of the house was changed to "House of Representatives." The speaker was responsible for appointing the speaker pro tempore until 1973, when selection for that office became subject to the opinion of the whole House.

In 1969, the General Assembly created the Legislative Services Commission to oversee the internal operations of the legislature and provide services to the body. The speaker was made an ex officio member of the commission. In 1975, the speaker was assigned their own legislative counsel.

For most of the twentieth century, the office's power was limited, because Speakers usually only served for a single legislative session. In 1977, the state constitution was amended to allow for governors and lieutenant governors to seek second terms. Shortly thereafter, the House, feeling threatened by the strengthened positions of the governor and Senate leadership, broke from a decades-long trend and began electing speakers to successive terms. This changed with Speakers Carl J. Stewart, Jr. (1977–1980), Liston B. Ramsey (1981–1988) and James B. Black (1999–2006).

Democrats held the speaker's chair continuously from 1899 until 1994, when Republicans gained a majority and elected Harold J. Brubaker in January 1995.

In the 2003–2004 session, a unique power-sharing arrangement was created by Democrats and a handful of Republicans. This resulted in the first election of two speakers simultaneously, Jim Black (Democrat) and Richard T. Morgan (Republican). The two held roughly equal power and took turns presiding over the House. After Democrats won a majority in the 2004 election, this arrangement was ended, but Morgan again supported Black and was named Speaker Pro Tempore.

== Powers and duties ==
The speaker has the power to appoint some members of state boards.

== List of speakers ==
=== Province of Carolina House of Burgesses ===
The following were speakers of the House of Burgesses of the Province of Carolina: (Note: Note that some sources refer to the lower House as the House of Commons before the Revolution as well as afterward.)

- George Catchmaid 1666
- Valentine Bird 1672–73
- Thomas Eastchurch 1675
- Thomas Cullen 1677
- George Durant 1679
- John Nixon 1689
- John Porter 1697–98
- William Wilkison 1703
- Thomas Boyd 1707
- Edward Moseley 1708
- Richard Sanderson 1709
- William Swann 1711
- Thomas Snoden 1711–12

=== Province of North Carolina House of Burgesses ===
The following were speakers of the House of Burgesses of the Province of North Carolina: (Note: Note that some sources refer to the lower House as the House of Commons before the Revolution as well as afterward.)

- Edward Moseley 1715–23
- Maurice Moore 1725
- John Baptista Ashe 1726
- Thomas Swann 1729
- Edward Moseley 1731–34
- William Downing 1735–39
- John Hodgson 1739–41
- Samuel Swann 1742–54
- John Campbell 1754 – c. 1760
- Samuel Swann c. 1760–62
- John Ashe 1762–65
- John Harvey 1766–69
- Richard Caswell 1770–71
- John Harvey 1773–75

=== House of Commons ===
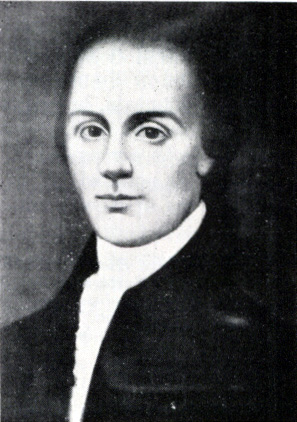
Abner Nash, 1st Speaker of the House of Commons, 1777

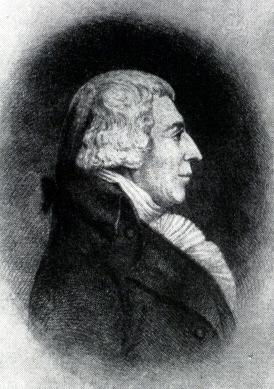
Speaker Richar Dobbs Spaight, 1785

The following members were elected speakers of the House of Commons in the state of North Carolina:

- Abner Nash 1777
- John Williams 1778
- Thomas Benbury 1778–82
- Edward Starkey 1783
- Thomas Benbury 1784 (April)
- William Blount 1784 (October)
- Richard Dobbs Spaight 1785
- John Baptista Ashe 1786–87
- John Sitgreaves 1787–88
- Stephen Cabarrus 1789–93
- John Leigh 1793–94
- Timothy Bloodworth 1794–95
- John Leigh 1795–96
- Mussenden Ebenezer Matthews 1797–99
- Stephen Cabarrus 1800–05
- John Moore 1806
- Joshua Grainger Wright 1807–08
- William Gaston 1808
- Thomas Davis 1809
- William Hawkins 1810–11
- William Miller 1812–14
- John Craig 1815
- Thomas Ruffin 1816
- James Iredell, Jr. 1816–18
- Romulus M. Saunders 1819–20
- James Mebane 1821
- John D. Jones 1822
- Alfred Moore 1823–25
- John Stanly 1825–27
- James Iredell, Jr. 1827–28
- Thomas Settle 1828–29
- William Julius Alexander 1829–30 (D)
- Charles Fisher 1830–32
- Louis D. Henry 1832–33
- William Julius Alexander 1833–35 (D)
- William H. Haywood, Jr. 1835–37 (D)
- William A. Graham 1838–40 (W)
- Robert B. Gilliam 1840–41 (W)
- Calvin Graves 1842–43 (D)
- Edward Stanly 1844–47 (W)
- Robert B. Gilliam 1846–49 (W)
- James C. Dobbin 1850–51 (D)
- John Baxter 1852 (W)
- Samuel P. Hill 1854–55 (D)
- Jesse G. Shepherd 1856–57 (D)
- Thomas Settle, Jr. 1858–59 (D)
- William T. Dortch 1860–61 (D)
- Nathan N. Fleming 1861
- Robert B. Gilliam 1862–63
- Richard Spaight Donnell 1863
- Marmaduke Swain Robins (1863) (Note: Marmaduke Swain Robins was elected on November 24, 1863 when illness kept Richard Spaight Donnell from that session. See Cheney, page 356, footnote 580.)
- William E. Mann (1863) (Note: William E. Mann served for a brief period as Speaker in the January adjourned session when Richard Donnell was ill.)
- Richard Spaight Donnell 1864–65
- Samuel F. Phillips 1865–66
- Rufus Yancey McAden 1866–67

=== House of Representatives ===
The following members were elected speaker of the House of Representatives:

- Joseph W. Holden 1868–70 (R) (Note: Joseph Holden resigned in the middle of the 1869–1870 session and W. A. Moore was elected to succeed him, according to the North Carolina Manual of 1913.)
- William A. Moore 1870 (R)
- Thomas J. Jarvis 1870–72 (D)
- James L. Robinson 1872–75 (D)
- Charles Price 1876–77 (D)
- John M. Moring 1879 (D)
- Charles M. Cooke 1881 (D)
- George M. Rose 1883 (D)
- Thomas Michael Holt 1885 (D)
- John R. Webster 1887 (I) (Note: John R. Webster was elected by the coalition of Independents and Republicans in the House, according to the New York Times and J. G. de R. Hamilton.)
- Augustus Leazar 1889 (D)
- Rufus A. Doughton 1891 (D)
- Lee S. Overman 1893 (D)
- Zeb V. Walser 1895 (R)
- A. F. Hileman 1897 (Populist)
- Henry G. Connor 1899–1900 (D)
- Walter E. Moore 1901 (D)
- S. M. Gattis 1903 (D)
- Owen Haywood Guion 1905 (D)
- E. J. Justice 1907 (D)
- A. W. Graham 1909 (D)
- W. C. Dowd 1911 (D)
- George Whitfield Connor 1913 (D) (Note: George Whitfield Connor resigned after the January 8 – March 12, 1913 session. Walter Murphy served as speaker during the "extra" session that began September 24, 1913, according to the North Carolina Manual of 1913.)
- Walter Murphy 1913 (D)
- Emmett R. Wooten 1915 (D)
- Walter Murphy 1917 (D)
- Dennis G. Brummitt 1919 (D)
- Harry P. Grier 1921 (D)
- John G. Dawson 1923–24 (D)
- Edgar W. Pharr 1925 (D)
- Richard T. Fountain 1927 (D)
- A. H. Graham 1929 (D)
- Willis Smith 1931 (D)
- R. L. Harris 1933 (D)
- Robert Johnson 1935–36 (D)
- R. Gregg Cherry 1937 (D)
- D. L. Ward 1939 (D)
- O. M. Mull 1941 (D)
- John Kerr Jr. 1943 (D)
- Oscar L. Richardson 1945 (D)
- Thomas J. Pearsall 1947 (D)
- Kerr Craig Ramsay 1949 (D)
- W. Frank Taylor 1951 (D)
- Eugene T. Bost, Jr. 1953 (D)
- Larry I. Moore, Jr. 1955–56 (D)
- James K. Doughton 1957 (D)
- Addison Hewlett 1959 (D)
- Joseph M. Hunt, Jr. 1961 (D)
- H. Clifton Blue 1963 (D)
- Hoyt Patrick Taylor, Jr. 1965–66 (D)
- David M. Britt 1967 (D)
- Earl W. Vaughn 1969 (D)
- Philip P. Godwin 1971 (D)
- James E. Ramsey 1973–74 (D)
- James C. Green 1975–76 (D)
- Carl J. Stewart, Jr. 1977–80 (D)
- Liston B. Ramsey 1981–88 (D)
- Josephus L. Mavretic 1989–90
- Daniel T. Blue, Jr. 1991–94 (D)
- Harold J. Brubaker 1995–98 (R)
- James B. Black 1999–2002 (D)
- James B. Black 2003–2004 (Co-Speaker or "Democratic Speaker")
- Richard T. Morgan 2003–2004 (Co-Speaker or "Republican Speaker")
- James B. Black 2005–2006 (D)
- Joe Hackney 2007–2010 (D)
- Thom Tillis 2011–2015 (R)
- Tim Moore 2015–2025 (R)
- Destin Hall 2025-Current (R)

== See also ==
- Speaker (politics)
- President Pro Tempore of the North Carolina Senate
- List of North Carolina state legislatures

== Works cited ==
- Cooper, Christopher A.; Knotts, H. Gibbs, eds. (2012). The New Politics of North Carolina. Chapel Hill: University of North Carolina Press. ISBN 9781469606583.
- Heath, Milton S. Jr. (September 1969). "The 1969 North Carolina General Assembly". Popular Government. Vol. 36, no. 1. UNC Institute of Government. pp. 1–10.
- Luebke, Paul (1990). Tar Heel Politics : Myths and Realities. Chapel Hill: The University of North Carolina Press. ISBN 0-8078-4271-0.
- O'Connor, Paul T. (January 1994). "The Evolution of the Speaker's Office". N.C. Insight. Vol. 15, no. 1. North Carolina Center for Public Policy Research. pp. 22–29, 32–41, 43–45.
- Potter, William H. Jr. (1975). "Staff Services to the North Carolina General Assembly". Popular Government. Vol. 40, no. 4. UNC Institute of Government. pp. 27–30.
