= 2012 North Carolina Superintendent of Public Instruction election =

- November 6, 2012
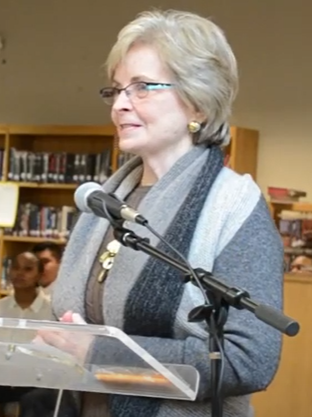

Candidate	June Atkinson	John Tedesco
Party	Democratic	Republican
Popular vote	2,336,441	1,971,049
Percentage	54.24%	45.76%
- Atkinson: 50–60% 60–70% 70–80% Tedesco: 50–60% 60–70% 70–80%
Superintendent of Public Instruction before election
June Atkinson
Democratic
Elected Superintendent of Public Instruction
June Atkinson
Democratic

The 2012 North Carolina Superintendent of Public Instruction election was held on November 6, 2012, to elect the North Carolina Superintendent of Public Instruction, concurrently with the 2012 presidential election, as well as elections to the U.S. House of Representatives, governor, the Council of State, and other state, local, and judicial elections. Primary elections were held on May 8, 2012, with a Republican primary runoff election being held on July 17. A debate was held on October 15, 2012.

Incumbent Democratic state superintendent June Atkinson ran for re-election to a third term in office, becoming the Democratic nominee uncontested. Republican Wake County School Board member John Tedesco won a heavily contested Republican primary, defeating teacher Richard Alexander in a July primary runoff and several other candidates in the May primary election. Atkinson won the general election by around 9 percentage points.

== Democratic primary ==
=== Candidates ===
==== Nominee ====
- June Atkinson, incumbent state superintendent (2004–present)

==== Withdrew before primary ====
- Rick Glazier, state representative from the 44th district (2003–2005) and 45th district (2005–present)

=== Results ===
Democratic primary results
Party	Candidate	Votes	%
Democratic	June Atkinson (incumbent)	Unopposed	
Total votes		—N/a	100.0

== Republican primary ==
=== Candidates ===
==== Nominee ====
- John Tedesco, member of the Wake County School Board

==== Eliminated in primary runoff ====
- Richard Alexander, special education teacher

==== Eliminated in primary ====
- Mark Crawford, former member of the North Carolina House of Representatives
- Ray Ernest Martin, teacher
- David Scholl, member of the Union County School Board

=== Endorsements ===
Ray Ernest Martin

Newspapers and other media

- Indy Week (Republican primary only)

=== Polling ===
Poll source	Date(s) administered	Sample size (Note: Key: A – all adults RV – registered voters LV – likely voters V – unclear)	Margin of error	John Tedesco	Richard Alexander	Mark Crawford	Ray Ernest Martin	David Scholl	Undecided
Public Policy Polling	May 5–6, 2012	469 (LV)	± 4.5%	16%	14%	12%	6%	6%	45%
Civitas Institute/National Research	April 30–May 2, 2012	400 (LV)	± 4.9%	16%	7%	2%	–	7%	67% (Note: Labeled as "Other")
Public Policy Polling	April 27–29, 2012	486 (LV)	± 4.4%	16%	13%	8%	5%	6%	52%
Civitas Institute/SurveyUSA	April 20–23, 2012	– (V)	± 5.0%	21%	9%	10%	5%	8%	47%
Public Policy Polling	April 20–22, 2012	521 (V)	± 4.3%	16%	13%	6%	5%	4%	57%
Public Policy Polling	February 29–March 1, 2012	411 (LV)	± 4.8%	12%	7%	6%	4%	5%	66%

=== Results ===
Primary results by county Tedesco: 20–30%; 30–40%; 40–50%; 50–60%; 60–70%; Alexander: 20–30%; 30–40%; 40–50%; Crawford: 20–30%; 30–40%; 40–50%

Runoff results by county Tedesco: 50–60%; 60–70%; 70–80%; 80–90%; Alexander: 50–60%; 60–70%; 70–80%

Republican primary results
Party	Candidate	Votes	%
Republican	John Tedesco	195,352	28.35%
Republican	Richard Alexander	167,354	24.28%
Republican	Mark Crawford	150,404	21.82%
Republican	Ray Ernest Martin	90,889	13.19%
Republican	David Scholl	85,145	12.36%
Total votes		689,144	100.00%
Runoff election
Republican	John Tedesco	75,780	54.42%
Republican	Richard Alexander	63,461	45.58%
Total votes		139,241	100.00%

== General election ==
=== Endorsements ===
June Atkinson (D)

Newspapers and other media

- Indy Week

Labor unions

- International Brotherhood of Boilermakers

=== Polling ===
Poll source	Date(s) administered	Sample size	Margin of error	June Atkinson (D)	John Tedesco (R)	Undecided
Public Policy Polling	October 23–25, 2012	880 (LV)	± 3.3%	42%	40%	18%
Public Policy Polling	September 27–30, 2012	981 (LV)	± 3.1%	44%	34%	22%
Public Policy Polling	August 2–5, 2012	813 (LV)	± 3.4%	44%	37%	19%

=== Results ===
2012 North Carolina Superintendent of Public Instruction election
Party	Candidate	Votes	%
Democratic	June Atkinson (incumbent)	2,336,441	54.24%
Republican	John Tedesco	1,971,049	45.76%
Total votes		4,307,490	100.00%
Democratic hold			

==== By congressional district ====
Despite losing the state, Tedesco won nine of 13 congressional districts, including one that elected a Democrat, with the remaining four going to Atkinson, including one that elected a Republican.

District	Atkinson	Tedesco	Representative
1st	77%	23%	G. K. Butterfield
2nd	49%	51%	Renee Ellmers
3rd	47%	53%	Walter B. Jones Jr.
4th	75%	25%	David Price
5th	45%	55%	Virginia Foxx
6th	48%	52%	Howard Coble
7th	48%	52%	Mike McIntyre
8th	49%	51%	Larry Kissell
8th	49%	51%	Richard Hudson
9th	45%	55%	Sue Myrick
9th	45%	55%	Robert Pittenger
10th	46%	54%	Patrick McHenry
11th	44%	56%	Heath Shuler
11th	44%	56%	Mark Meadows
12th	80%	20%	Mel Watt
13th	52%	48%	Brad Miller
13th	52%	48%	George Holding
