= 2016 North Carolina Superintendent of Public Instruction election =

- November 8, 2016
- Turnout: 68.98%
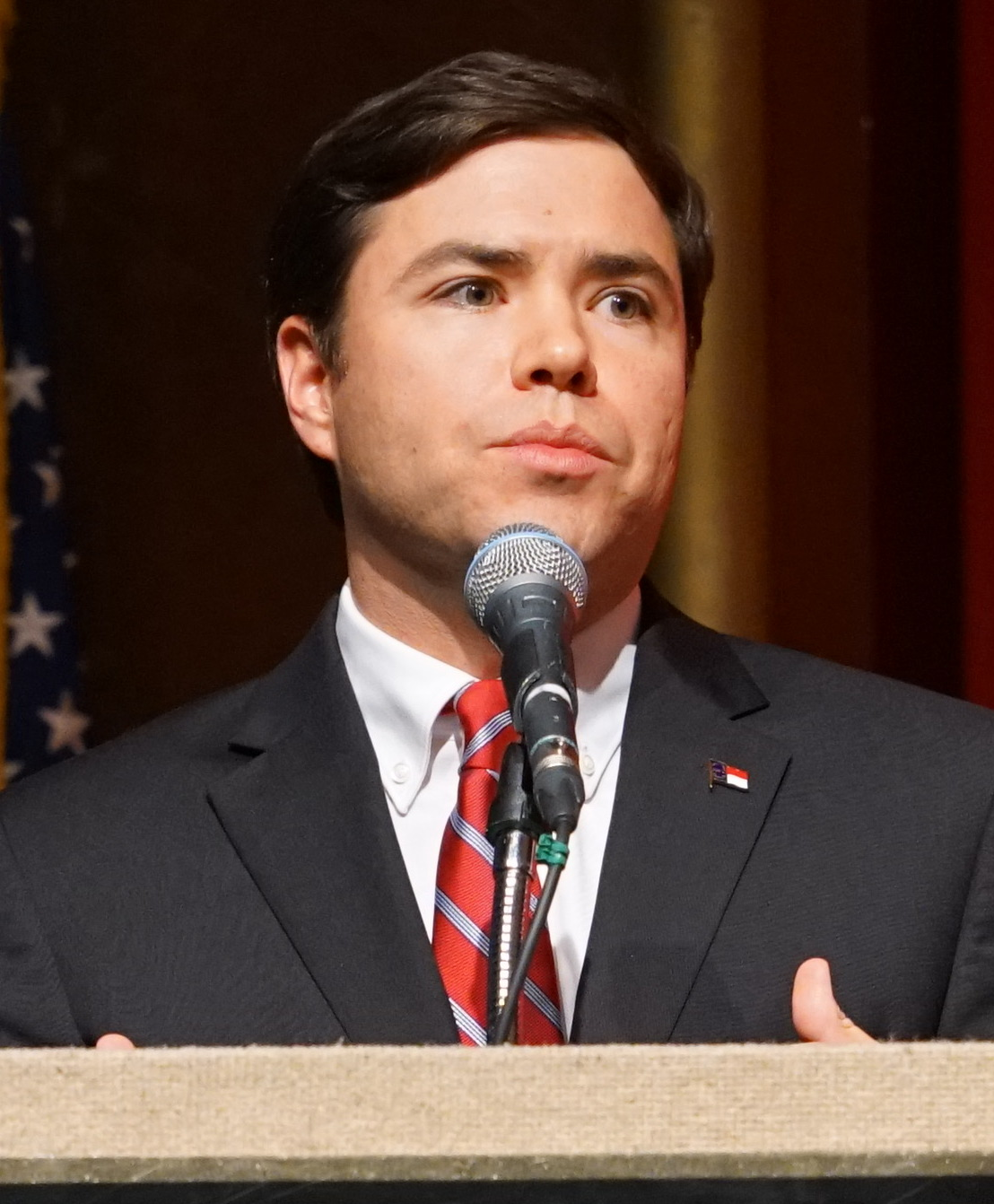

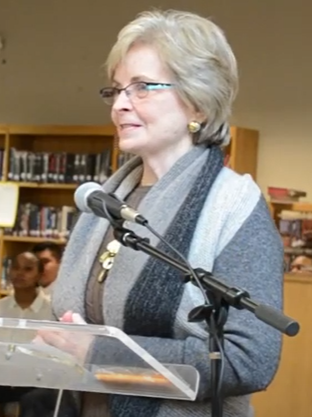
| Candidate | Mark Johnson | June Atkinson |
| Party | Republican | Democratic |
| Popular vote | 2,285,783 | 2,231,903 |
| Percentage | 50.60% | 49.40% |
- County results Johnson: 50–60% 60–70% 70–80% Atkinson: 50–60% 60–70% 70–80%
Superintendent of Public Instruction before election
June Atkinson
Democratic
Elected Superintendent of Public Instruction
Mark Johnson
Republican

The 2016 North Carolina Superintendent of Public Instruction election was held on November 8, 2016, to elect the North Carolina Superintendent of Public Instruction.

Republican attorney Mark Johnson defeated Democratic three-term incumbent June Atkinson in what was considered an upset.

== Democratic primary ==
=== Candidates ===
==== Nominee ====
- June Atkinson, incumbent state superintendent (2004–present)

==== Eliminated in primary ====
- Henry Pankey, retired school principal in Winston-Salem

=== Endorsements ===
June Atkinson

Newspapers and other media

- Indy Week (Democratic primary only)
Henry Pankey

Newspapers and other media

- Winston-Salem Chronicle (Democratic primary only)

=== Results ===
Results by county Atkinson: 50–60%; 60–70%; 70–80%; 80–90%; >90%; Pankey: 50–60%

Democratic primary results
| Party | Candidate | Votes | % |
|---|---|---|---|
| Democratic | June Atkinson (incumbent) | 776,302 | 79.78% |
| Democratic | Henry Pankey | 196,703 | 20.22% |
| Total votes | | 973,005 | 100.00% |

== Republican primary ==
=== Candidates ===
==== Nominee ====
- Mark Johnson, Winston-Salem lawyer

==== Eliminated in primary ====
- Rosemary Stein, pediatrician
- J. Wesley Sills, Harnett County teacher

=== Results ===
Results by county Johnson: 40–50%; 50–60%; 60–70%; Stein: 40–50%; 50–60%

Republican primary results
| Party | Candidate | Votes | % |
|---|---|---|---|
| Republican | Mark Johnson | 441,865 | 53.35% |
| Republican | Rosemary Stein | 272,131 | 32.85% |
| Republican | J. Wesley Sills | 114,274 | 13.80% |
| Total votes | | 828,270 | 100.00% |

== General election ==
=== Endorsements ===
June Atkinson (D)

Newspapers and other media

- Indy Week
- The News & Observer

=== Results ===
2016 North Carolina Superintendent of Public Instruction election
| Party | Candidate | Votes | % |
|---|---|---|---|
| Republican | Mark Johnson | 2,285,783 | 50.60% |
| Democratic | June Atkinson (incumbent) | 2,231,903 | 49.40% |
| Total votes | | 4,517,686 | 100.00% |
| Republican gain from Democratic | | | |
