= 2020 North Carolina Superintendent of Public Instruction election =

- November 3, 2020
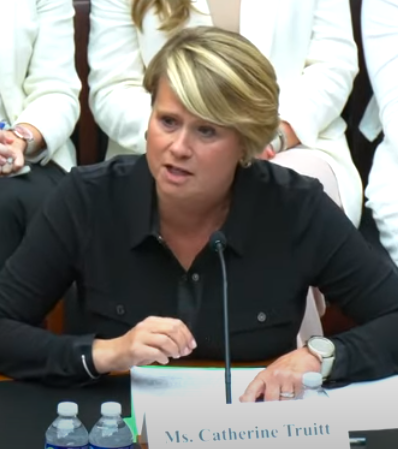

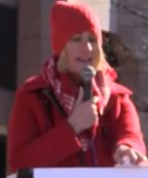
Candidate	Catherine Truitt	Jen Mangrum
Party	Republican	Democratic
Popular vote	2,753,220	2,605,169
Percentage	51.38%	48.62%
- County results; Truitt: 50–60% 60–70% 70–80% 80–90%; Mangrum: 50–60% 60–70% 70–80%
Superintendent of Public Instruction before election
Mark Johnson
Republican
Elected Superintendent of Public Instruction
Catherine Truitt
Republican

The 2020 North Carolina Superintendent of Public Instruction election was held on November 3, 2020, to elect the North Carolina Superintendent of Public Instruction, concurrently with elections to the United States Senate, U.S. House of Representatives, governor, Council of State, and other state and local elections. Primary elections were held on March 3, 2020, with runoff elections being rescheduled to June 23 due to the COVID-19 pandemic.

Incumbent Republican superintendent Mark Johnson was eligible to run for re-election to a second term in office, but ran unsuccessfully for lieutenant governor instead. Republican nominee and former senior advisor on education to Pat McCrory, Catherine Truitt, defeated Democratic professor and former state senate candidate Jen Mangrum in the general election.

== Republican primary ==
=== Candidates ===
==== Nominee ====
- Catherine Truitt, teacher and former senior advisor on education to governor Pat McCrory

==== Eliminated in primary ====
- D. Craig Horn, state representative from the 68th district (2011-present)

==== Declined ====
- Mark Johnson, incumbent state superintendent (2017-present) (ran for lieutenant governor)

=== Results ===
Republican primary results
Party	Candidate	Votes	%
Republican	Catherine Truitt	391,915	56.68%
Republican	D. Craig Horn	299,578	43.32%
Total votes		691,493	100.00%

== Democratic primary ==
=== Candidates ===
==== Nominee ====
- Jen Mangrum, professor at University of North Carolina at Greensboro and nominee for state senate in 2018

==== Eliminated in primary ====
- James Barrett, Chapel Hill-Carrboro school board member
- Constance Lav Johnson, magazine owner and former education official
- Michael Maher, professor at North Carolina State University
- Keith Sutton, Wake County school board member

==== Withdrawn ====
- Amy Jablonski, education official and former teacher

=== Endorsements ===
Keith Sutton

Labor unions

- North Carolina AFL-CIO

=== Results ===
Democratic primary results
Party	Candidate	Votes	%
Democratic	Jen Mangrum	378,396	33.17%
Democratic	Keith Sutton	303,592	26.61%
Democratic	Constance Lav Johnson	240,710	21.10%
Democratic	James Barrett	122,855	10.77%
Democratic	Michael Maher	85,239	8.35%
Total votes		1,140,792	100.00%

== General election ==
=== Post-primary endorsements ===
Catherine Truitt (R)

Organizations

- State Employees Association of North Carolina
Jen Mangrum (D)

Newspapers and other media

- Indy Week
- The Charlotte Observer
- The News & Observer (Raleigh)

Organizations

- Equality North Carolina
- North Carolina Association of Educators

=== Polling ===
Poll source	Date(s) administered	Sample size	Margin of error	Catherine Truitt (R)	Jen Mangrum (D)	Undecided
Harper Polling/Civitas (R)	October 22–25, 2020	504 (LV)	± 4.4%	42%	45%	13%
Harper Polling/Civitas (R)	September 17–20, 2020	612 (LV)	± 3.96%	38%	38%	22%
Harper Polling/Civitas (R)	August 6–10, 2020	600 (LV)	± 4.0%	35%	35%	31%

=== Results ===
2020 North Carolina Superintendent of Public Instruction election
Party	Candidate	Votes	%
Republican	Catherine Truitt	2,753,220	51.38%
Democratic	Jen Mangrum	2,605,169	48.62%
Total votes		5,358,389	100.00%
Republican hold			
