= 2016 North Carolina Council of State election =

- November 8, 2016

All 10 members of the North Carolina Council of State
	Majority party	Minority party
Party	Republican	Democratic
Last election	4	6
Seats won	6	4
Seat change	▲2	▼2
Percentage	51.2%	48.2%
Swing	▲5.2	▼5.6

Elections were held in North Carolina on November 8, 2016, to select the ten officers of the North Carolina Council of State. This elections coincided with the presidential election, elections to the House of Representatives, elections to the Senate and state elections to the General Assembly and judiciary. Primary elections were held March 15.

The ten members of the North Carolina Council of State are statewide-elected officers serving four-year terms. The pre-election partisan makeup of the Council of State consisted of 6 Democrats and 4 Republicans. After the election, the partisan makeup was reversed, with 6 Republicans and 4 Democrats winning. Three incumbents were defeated: Governor Pat McCrory (R), Superintendent of Public Education June Atkinson (D), and Commissioner of Insurance Wayne Goodwin (D).

Additionally, Republicans flipped the Treasurer in an open race from the Democrats, while Democrats held the open Attorney General race.

== Governor ==
Republican Pat McCrory, the incumbent, faced Democratic nominee Roy Cooper, the incumbent North Carolina attorney general, and Libertarian nominee Lon Cecil in the general election. Cooper won with 49% of the vote.

== Lieutenant governor ==
Republican Dan Forest, the incumbent, faced Democratic nominee Linda Coleman, a former director of the Office of State Personnel, former state representative and nominee for lieutenant governor in 2012, and Libertarian nominee Jacki Cole in the general election. Forest won with more than 51% of the vote.

== Attorney general ==
Democrat Roy Cooper, the incumbent, ran for governor.

Josh Stein, state senator and former deputy attorney general of North Carolina, was the Democratic nominee for the post, and Buck Newton, another state senator, was the Republican nominee. Stein won with just over 50% of the vote.

== Secretary of State ==
2016 North Carolina Secretary of State election
- November 8, 2016
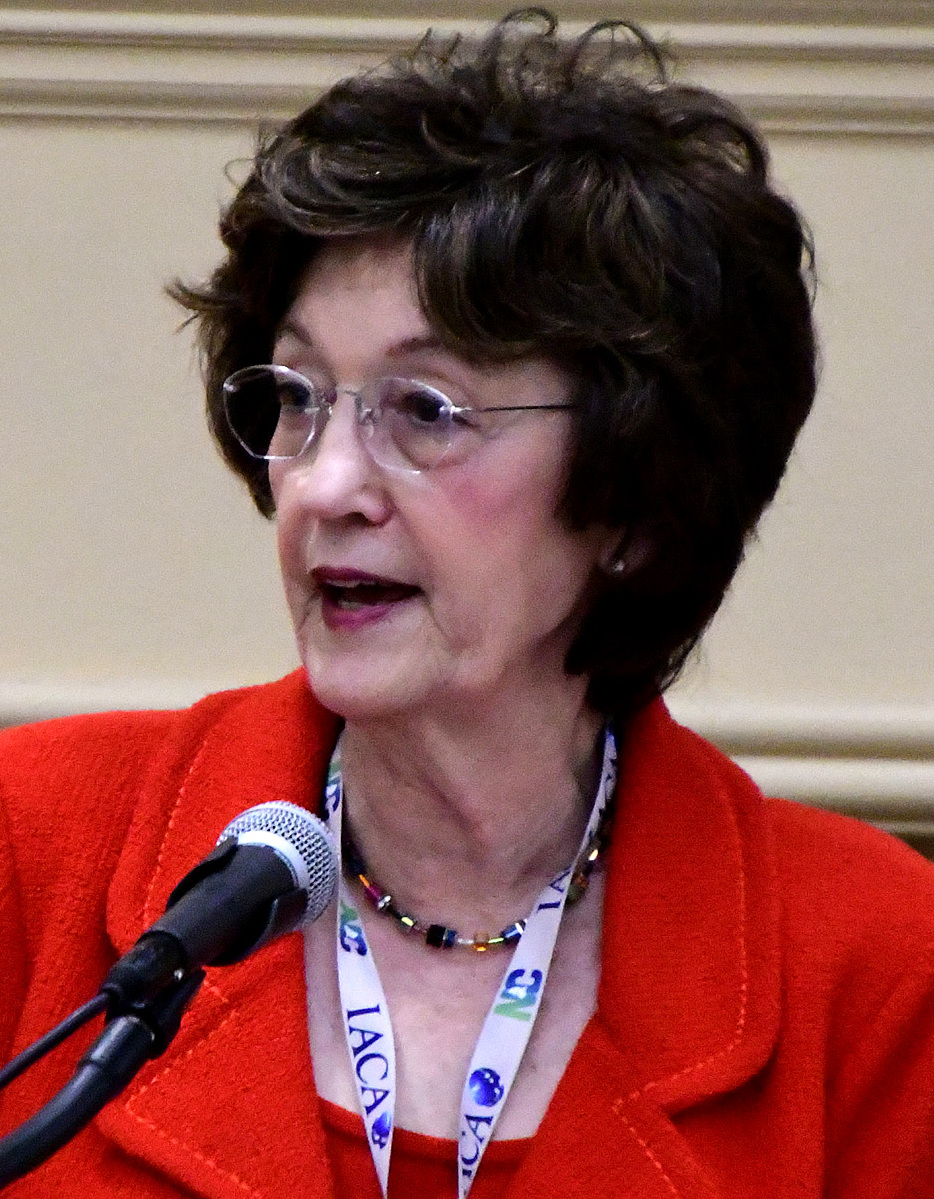

Nominee	Elaine Marshall	Michael LaPaglia
Party	Democratic	Republican
Popular vote	2,368,091	2,163,185
Percentage	52.26%	47.74%
- County results; Marshall: 50-60% 60-70% 70-80% 80–90%; LaPaglia: 50-60% 60-70% 70-80%
Secretary of State before election
Elaine Marshall
Democratic
Elected Secretary of State
Elaine Marshall
Democratic

Democrat Elaine Marshall, the incumbent, ran for a sixth term.

=== Democratic primary ===
==== Candidates ====
- Elaine Marshall, Incumbent (unopposed in the primary)

=== Republican primary ===
==== Candidates ====
- A.J. Daoud, member of state lottery commission, 2012 candidate
- Michael LaPaglia, businessman

==== Results ====
Republican primary results
Party	Candidate	Votes	%
Republican	Michael LaPaglia	499,919	61.6
Republican	A.J. Daoud	312,067	38.4
Total votes		811,986	100.0

=== General election ===
==== Results ====
North Carolina Secretary of State election, 2016
Party	Candidate	Votes	%	±%
Democratic	Elaine Marshall (incumbent)	2,368,091	52.26%	−1.53%
Republican	Michael LaPaglia	2,163,185	47.74%	+1.53%
Total votes		4,531,276	100.0%	N/A
Democratic hold				

== State Auditor ==
2016 North Carolina State Auditor election
- November 8, 2016

Nominee	Beth Wood	Chuck Stuber
Party	Democratic	Republican
Popular vote	2,259,436	2,253,394
Percentage	50.07%	49.93%
- County results; Wood: 50-60% 60-70% 70-80%; Stuber: 50-60% 60-70% 70-80%
State Auditor before election
Beth Wood
Democratic
Elected State Auditor
Beth Wood
Democratic

Democrat Beth Wood, the incumbent, ran for reelection to a third term.

=== Democratic primary ===
==== Candidates ====
- Beth Wood, incumbent (unopposed in the primary)

=== Republican primary ===
==== Candidates ====
- Chuck Stuber, former FBI special agent (unopposed in the primary)

=== General election ===
==== Results ====
North Carolina State Auditor election, 2016
Party	Candidate	Votes	%	±%
Democratic	Beth A. Wood (incumbent)	2,259,436	50.07%	−3.64%
Republican	Chuck Stuber	2,253,394	49.93%	+3.64%
Total votes		4,512,830	100.0%	N/A
Democratic hold				

Stuber called for a recount even before the election results were officially certified, and it seemed likely that the margin of difference between the candidates would remain well under the 10,000-vote threshold that a recount requires. But as the recount neared completion and the outcome remained the same, Stuber conceded the election on Dec. 9.

== State Treasurer ==
2016 North Carolina State Treasurer election
- November 8, 2016
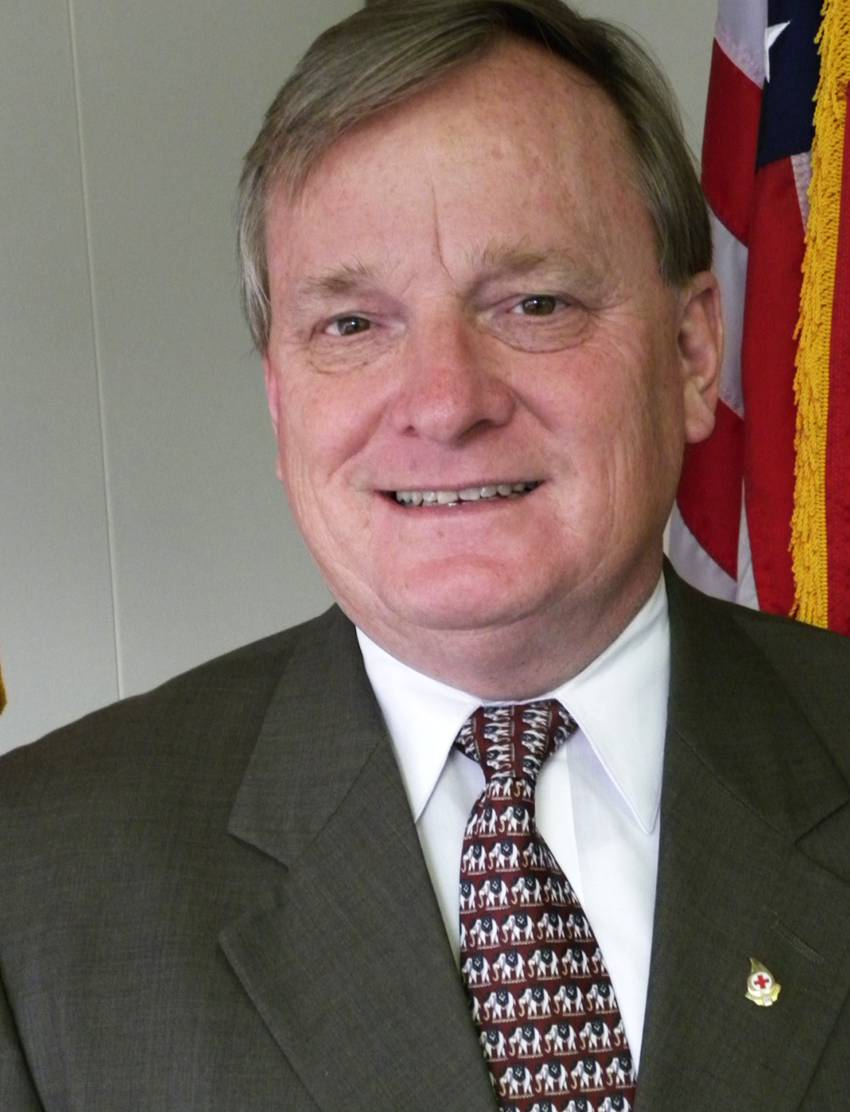

Nominee	Dale Folwell	Dan Blue III
Party	Republican	Democratic
Popular vote	2,373,022	2,129,762
Percentage	52.70%	47.30%
- County results; Folwell: 50-60% 60-70% 70-80%; Blue: 50-60% 60-70% 70-80%
State Treasurer before election
Janet Cowell
Democratic
Elected State Treasurer
Dale Folwell
Republican

Janet Cowell, a Democrat and the incumbent Treasurer, announced she would not run for reelection.

=== Democratic primary ===
==== Candidates ====
- Dan Blue III, attorney, former investment banker, former Wake County Democratic Party chair
- Ron Elmer, CPA and money manager

==== Results ====
Democratic primary results
Party	Candidate	Votes	%
Democratic	Dan Blue III	553,459	58.4
Democratic	Ron Elmer	393,834	41.6
Total votes		947,293	100.0

=== Republican primary ===
==== Candidates ====
- Dale Folwell, CPA and former state representative (unopposed in the primary)

=== General election ===
==== Results ====
North Carolina State Treasurer election, 2016
Party	Candidate	Votes	%	±%
Republican	Dale R. Folwell	2,373,022	52.70%	+6.53%
Democratic	Dan Blue III	2,129,762	47.30%	−6.53%
Total votes		4,502,784	100.0%	N/A
Republican gain from Democratic				

Folwell became the first North Carolina State Treasurer elected from a party other than the Democratic Party since William H. Worth, a Populist, was elected in 1896.

== Superintendent of Public Instruction ==
2016 North Carolina Superintendent of Public Instruction election
- November 8, 2016
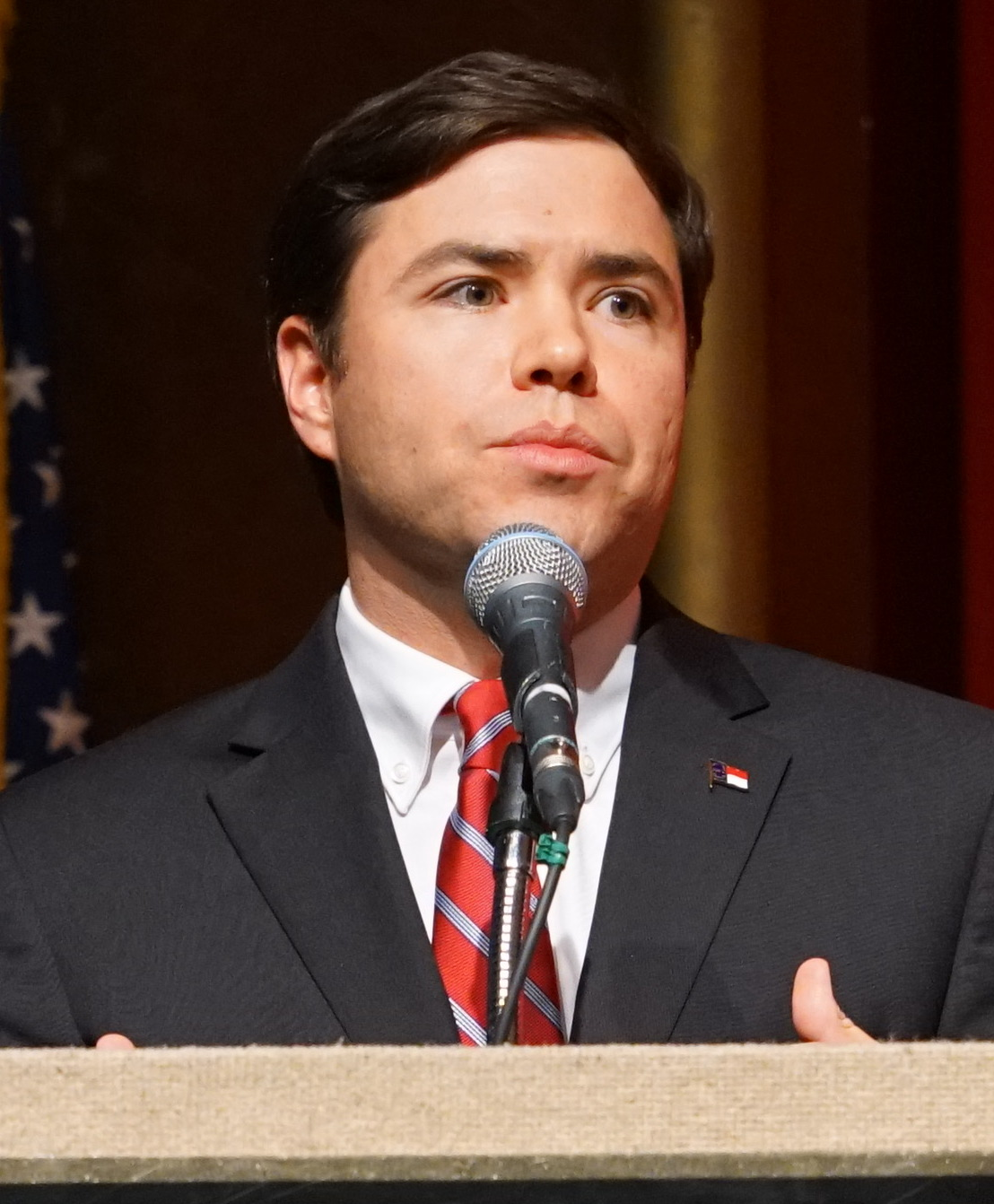

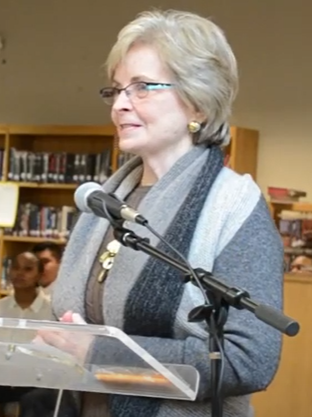
Nominee	Mark Johnson	June Atkinson
Party	Republican	Democratic
Popular vote	2,285,783	2,231,903
Percentage	50.60%	49.40%
- County results; Johnson: 50-60% 60-70% 70-80%; Atkinson: 50-60% 60-70% 70-80%
Superintendent of Public Instruction election before election
June Atkinson
Democratic
Elected Superintendent of Public Instruction election
Mark Johnson
Republican

Democrat June Atkinson, the incumbent, ran for a fourth term in 2016. When it was believed that Atkinson was not going to run for re-election, State Rep. Tricia Cotham was considered a potential Democratic candidate.

=== Democratic primary ===
==== Candidates ====
- June Atkinson, incumbent
- Henry Pankey, retired school principal

==== Results ====
Democratic primary results
Party	Candidate	Votes	%
Democratic	June Atkinson (incumbent)	776,302	79.8
Democratic	Henry Pankey	196,703	20.2
Total votes		973,005	100.0

=== Republican primary ===
==== Candidates ====
- Mark Johnson, Forsyth County School Board member
- Dr. Rosemary Stein, Physician, former Alamance Community College Trustee & GOP Activist
- J. Wesley Sills, teacher

==== Results ====
Republican primary results
Party	Candidate	Votes	%
Republican	Mark Johnson	441,865	53.3
Republican	Rosemary Stein	272,131	32.9
Republican	J. Wesley Sills	114,274	13.8
Total votes		828,270	100.0

=== General election ===
==== Results ====
North Carolina Superintendent of Public Instruction election, 2016
Party	Candidate	Votes	%	±%
Republican	Mark Johnson	2,285,783	50.60%	+4.84%
Democratic	June Atkinson (incumbent)	2,231,903	49.40%	−4.84%
Total votes		4,517,686	100.0%	N/A
Republican gain from Democratic				

Johnson became the first Republican (or member of any party other than the Democratic Party) elected Superintendent since 1896, when Charles H. Mebane was elected.

== Commissioner of Agriculture ==
2016 North Carolina Commissioner of Agriculture election
- November 8, 2016
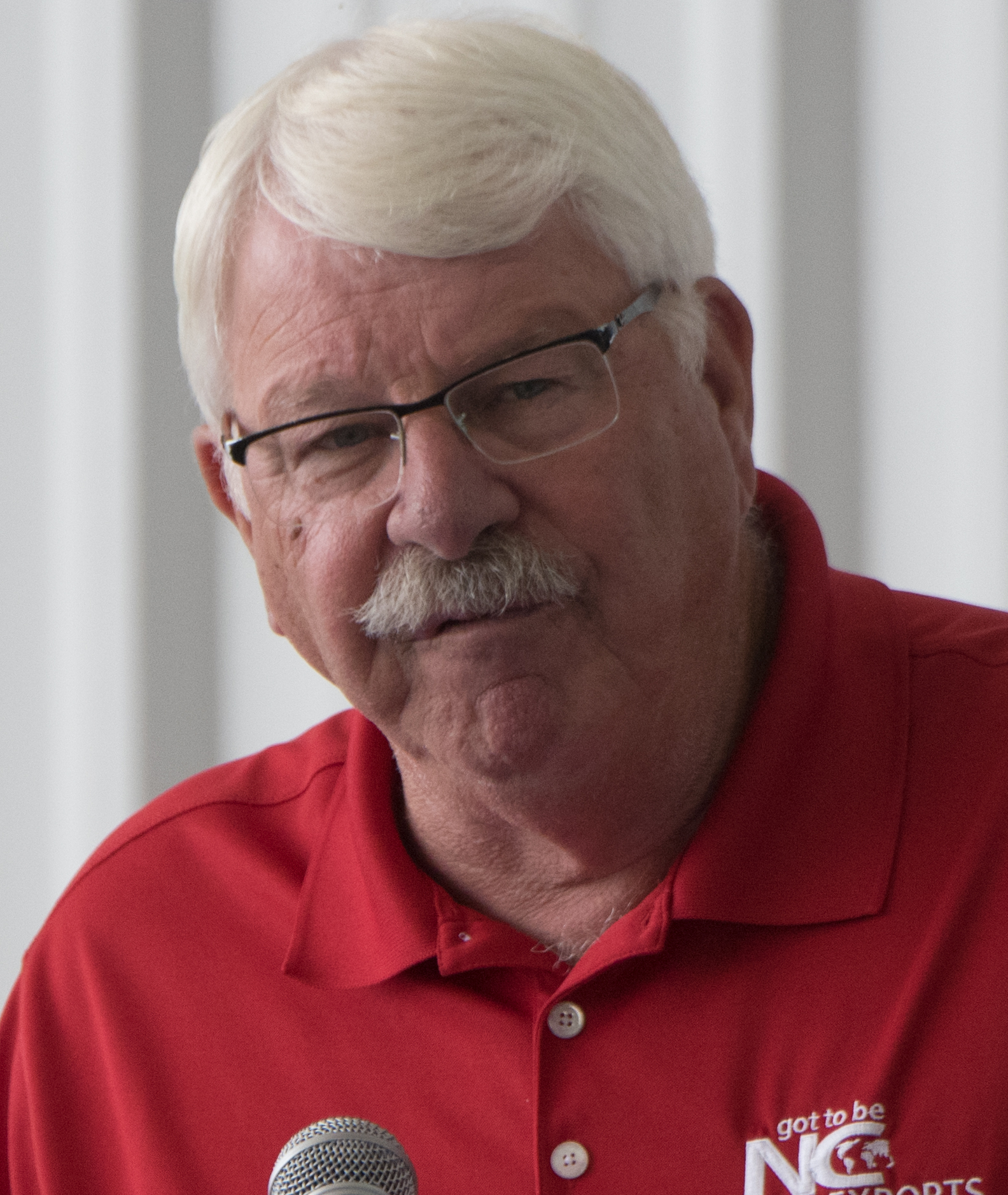

Nominee	Steve Troxler	Walter Smith
Party	Republican	Democratic
Popular vote	2,524,445	2,018,872
Percentage	55.56%	44.44%
- County results; Troxler: 50-60% 60-70% 70-80% 80-90%; Smith: 50-60% 60-70% 70-80%
Commissioner of Agriculture before election
Steve Troxler
Republican
Elected Commissioner of Agriculture
Steve Troxler
Republican

Republican Steve Troxler, the incumbent, ran for a fourth term.

=== Democratic primary ===
==== Candidates ====
- Walter Smith, former mayor of Boonville, former USDA official and nominee in 2012 (unopposed in the primary)

=== Republican primary ===
==== Candidates ====
- Andy Stevens
- Steve Troxler, incumbent

==== Results ====
Republican primary results
Party	Candidate	Votes	%
Republican	Steve Troxler (incumbent)	634,100	68.8
Republican	Andy Stevens	287,948	31.2
Total votes		922,048	100.0

=== General election ===
==== Results ====
North Carolina Commissioner of Agriculture election, 2016
Party	Candidate	Votes	%	±%
Republican	Steve Troxler	2,524,445	55.56%	+2.34%
Democratic	Walter Smith	2,018,872	44.44%	−2.34%
Total votes		4,543,317	100.0%	N/A
Republican hold				

Steve Troxler received more votes than any other candidate in North Carolina in 2016. As of 2021, this is the last statewide election in which the Republican candidate won Wake County and Chatham County.

== Commissioner of Labor ==
2016 North Carolina Commissioner of Labor election
- November 8, 2016
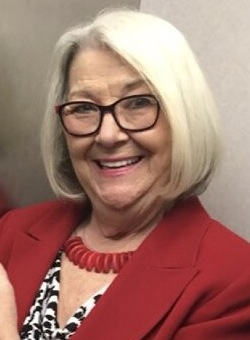

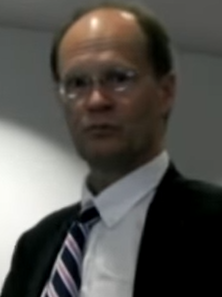
Nominee	Cherie Berry	Charles Meeker
Party	Republican	Democratic
Popular vote	2,505,628	2,029,227
Percentage	55.19%	44.70%
- County results; Berry: 50-60% 60-70% 70-80% 80-90%; Meeker: 50-60% 60-70% 70-80%
Commissioner of Labor before election
Cherie Berry
Republican
Elected Commissioner of Labor
Cherie Berry
Republican

Republican Cherie Berry, the incumbent, ran for reelection to a fifth term.

=== Democratic primary ===
==== Candidates ====
- Mazie Ferguson
- Charles Meeker, attorney and former mayor of Raleigh

==== Results ====
Democratic primary results
Party	Candidate	Votes	%
Democratic	Charles Meeker	531,273	56.5
Democratic	Mazie Ferguson	408,243	43.5
Total votes		939,516	100.0

=== Republican primary ===
==== Candidates ====
- Cherie Berry, incumbent (unopposed in the primary)

=== General election ===
==== Results ====
North Carolina Commissioner of Labor election, 2016
Party	Candidate	Votes	%	±%
Republican	Cherie Berry (incumbent)	2,505,628	55.19%	+1.93%
Democratic	Charles Meeker	2,029,227	44.70%	−2.04%
n/a	Write-ins	5,067	0.11%	N/A
Total votes		4,539,922	100.0%	N/A
Republican hold				

== Commissioner of Insurance ==
2016 North Carolina Commissioner of Insurance election
- November 8, 2016
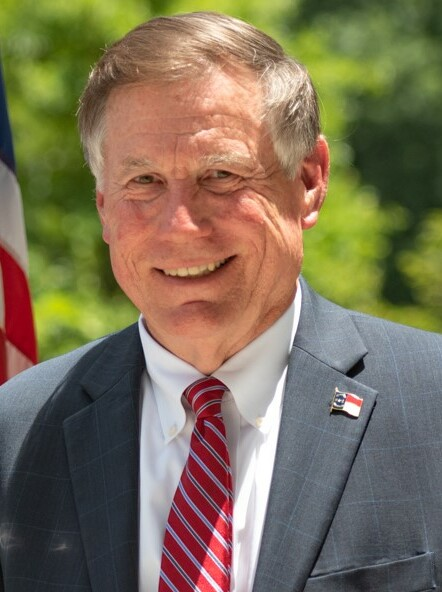

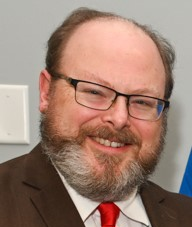
Nominee	Mike Causey	Wayne Goodwin
Party	Republican	Democratic
Popular vote	2,270,841	2,234,953
Percentage	50.40%	49.60%
- County results; Causey: 50-60% 60-70% 70-80%; Goodwin: 50-60% 60-70% 70-80%
Commissioner of Insurance before election
Wayne Goodwin
Democratic
Elected Commissioner of Insurance
Mike Causey
Republican

Democrat Wayne Goodwin, the incumbent, ran for re-election to a third term in 2016.

=== Democratic primary ===
==== Candidates ====
- Wayne Goodwin, incumbent (unopposed in the primary)

=== Republican primary ===
==== Candidates ====
- Mike Causey, former lobbyist and failed GOP nominee for state Insurance Commissioner in 1992, 1996, 2000, and 2012, and losing candidate for Congress in 2014
- Joe McLaughlin, former Onslow County commissioner
- Ron Pierce, General Contractor, Ex-Airline Mechanic & Army Veteran

===== Withdrawn =====
- Heather Grant, Yadkinville nurse and Republican primary candidate for US Senate in 2014

==== Results ====
Republican primary results
Party	Candidate	Votes	%
Republican	Mike Causey	340,936	41.2
Republican	Joe McLaughlin	272,846	33.0
Republican	Ron Pierce	214,126	25.8
Total votes		827,908	100.0

=== General election ===
==== Results ====
North Carolina Commissioner of Insurance election, 2016
Party	Candidate	Votes	%	±%
Republican	Mike Causey	2,270,841	50.40%	+2.26%
Democratic	Wayne Goodwin (incumbent)	2,234,953	49.60%	−2.26%
Total votes		4,505,794	100.0%	N/A
Republican gain from Democratic				

Causey became the first Republican ever elected to the office of North Carolina Commissioner of Insurance.

== See also ==
- North Carolina Council of State elections: 1996, 2000, 2004, 2008, 2012.
