= North Carolina's 13th congressional district =

U.S. House district for North Carolina

Coordinates: 35.50°N 78.49°W

- Interactive map of district boundaries since January 3, 2025 (Note: As the mid-decade redistricting bill (S249) enacted on October 22, 2025 only changed the compositions of North Carolina's 1st and 3rd congressional districts, boundaries of other districts will not change at the 2026 elections.)
- Representative: Brad Knott; R–Raleigh
- Population (2025): 864,380
- Median household income: $90,922
- Ethnicity: 63.2% White; 17.8% Black; 13.1% Hispanic; 4.0% Two or more races; 1.1% Asian; 0.9% other
- Cook PVI: R+8

North Carolina's 13th congressional district was re-established in 2002 after the state gained population in the 2000 United States census. Previously, the state had 13 districts from the first election following the 1810 census until the reapportionment following the 1840 census. On October 25, 2023, the North Carolina General Assembly redrew and approved a new map shifting its competitive Cook Partisan Voting Index of R+2 to R+8. It is considered to be one of the most heavily gerrymandered districts in the state.

The 13th congressional district is currently represented by Brad Knott.

== History ==
From 2003 to 2013, the district included all of Person and Caswell Counties; as well as parts of Alamance, Granville, Guilford, Rockingham, and Wake Counties. However, reapportionment after the 2010 census shifted the district more to the south and east. As a result, it lost its share of Alamance, Caswell, Guilford, Person, and Rockingham Counties. In the place of those five counties, portions of Durham, Edgecombe, Franklin, Nash, Vance, Wayne, and Wilson Counties were added. Less of Granville County and more of Wake County were also included. While Barack Obama carried the old 13th with 59 percent of the vote in 2008, John McCain would have won it with 54 percent of the vote had it existed under the new lines.

As a result, Democratic Congressman Brad Miller, who represented the district from its creation in 2003, announced he would not seek re-election to office in 2012. From 2013 to 2017, the district was represented by Republican George Holding.

After mid-decade redistricting, most of the old 13th district was essentially merged with the old 2nd district. A new 13th district was created, stretching from the northern suburbs of Charlotte to Greensboro. Republican Ted Budd became the first congressman from this new district.

In 2021, a new 13th district was created that included counties west of Charlotte. While North Carolina Speaker of the House Tim Moore was expected to run for the seat, he said he would not after Madison Cawthorn announced his candidacy.

In 2022, the North Carolina Supreme Court rejected the redrawn districts, later approving a new map for the 2022 United States House of Representatives elections in North Carolina in which the 13th district included Johnston County and parts of Harnett, Wake, and Wayne Counties in the Raleigh area.

On October 25, 2023, the North Carolina General Assembly redrew and approved a congressional map for the 2024 election, shifting the district from being the most competitive with Cook Partisan Voting Index of R+1 to R+11, making it one of the most Republican districts in North Carolina. It is also one of the most gerrymandered districts in the state.

== Counties and communities ==
For the 119th and successive Congresses (based on the districts drawn following a 2023 legislative session), the district contains all or portions of the following counties and communities.

Caswell County (2)

Milton, Yanceyville

Franklin County (7)

All seven communities

Granville County (5)

Butner, Creedmoor, Oxford (part; also 1st), Stem, Stovall

Harnett County (11)

All 11 communities

Johnston County (11)

All 11 communities

Lee County (2)

Broadway, Sanford

Person County (2)

Rougemont (part; also 4th; shared with Durham County), Roxboro

Wake County (11)

Angier (shared with Harnett County), Cary (part; also 2nd, 4th, and 9th; shared with Chatham and Durham counties), Clayton (shared with Johnston County), Fuquay-Varina (part; also 4th), Garner (part; also 2nd), Holly Springs (part; also 4th), Raleigh (part; also 2nd and 4th; shared with Durham County), Rolesville (part; also 2nd), Wake Forest (part; also 2nd; shared with Franklin County), Wendell (part; also 2nd), Zebulon (part; also 2nd)

== Recent election results from statewide races ==
Year	Office	Results
2008	President	McCain 57% - 42%
2008	Senate	Dole 51% - 46%
2008	Governor	McCrory 52% - 45%
2010	Senate	Burr 60% - 38%
2012	President	Romney 59% - 41%
2012	Governor	McCrory 61% - 37%
2014	Senate	Tillis 56% - 40%
2016	President	Trump 58% - 38%
2016	Senate	Burr 59% - 38%
2016	Governor	McCrory 57% - 41%
2016	Lt. Governor	Forest 60% - 38%
2016	Secretary of State	LaPaglia 53% - 47%
2016	Auditor	Stuber 55% - 45%
2016	Treasurer	Folwell 60% - 40%
2016	Attorney General	Newton 57% - 43%
2020	President	Trump 58% - 41%
2020	Senate	Tillis 56% - 39%
2020	Governor	Forest 54% - 44%
2020	Lt. Governor	Robinson 59% - 41%
2020	Secretary of State	Sykes 55% - 45%
2020	Auditor	Street 55% - 45%
2020	Treasurer	Folwell 60% - 40%
2020	Attorney General	O'Neill 57% - 43%
2022	Senate	Budd 57% - 40%
2024	President	Trump 58% - 41%
2024	Governor	Stein 49% - 45%
2024	Lt. Governor	Weatherman 54% - 43%
2024	Secretary of State	Brown 54% - 46%
2024	Auditor	Boliek 56% - 41%
2024	Treasurer	Briner 59% - 41%
2024	Attorney General	Bishop 55% - 45%

== List of members representing the district ==
Member (Residence)	Party	Years	Cong ress	Electoral history	District location
District established March 4, 1813
Meshack Franklin (Scullcamp)	Democratic-Republican	March 4, 1813 – March 3, 1815	13th	Redistricted from the 12th district and re-elected in 1813. Lost re-election.	1813–1823 [data missing]
Lewis Williams (Panther Creek)	Democratic-Republican (Note: Supported the Crawford faction in the 1824 United States presidential election.)	March 4, 1815 – March 3, 1825	14th 15th 16th 17th 18th 19th 20th 21st 22nd 23rd 24th 25th 26th 27th	Elected in 1815. Re-elected in 1817. Re-elected in 1819. Re-elected in 1821. Re-elected in 1823. Re-elected in 1823. Re-elected in 1825. Re-elected in 1827. Re-elected in 1829. Re-elected in 1831. Re-elected in 1833. Re-elected in 1835. Re-elected in 1837. Re-elected in 1839. Re-elected in 1841. Died.	1813–1823 [data missing]
Lewis Williams (Panther Creek)	Democratic-Republican	March 4, 1815 – March 3, 1825	14th 15th 16th 17th 18th 19th 20th 21st 22nd 23rd 24th 25th 26th 27th	Elected in 1815. Re-elected in 1817. Re-elected in 1819. Re-elected in 1821. Re-elected in 1823. Re-elected in 1823. Re-elected in 1825. Re-elected in 1827. Re-elected in 1829. Re-elected in 1831. Re-elected in 1833. Re-elected in 1835. Re-elected in 1837. Re-elected in 1839. Re-elected in 1841. Died.	1823–1833 [data missing]
Lewis Williams (Panther Creek)	Anti-Jacksonian	March 4, 1825 – March 3, 1837	14th 15th 16th 17th 18th 19th 20th 21st 22nd 23rd 24th 25th 26th 27th	Elected in 1815. Re-elected in 1817. Re-elected in 1819. Re-elected in 1821. Re-elected in 1823. Re-elected in 1823. Re-elected in 1825. Re-elected in 1827. Re-elected in 1829. Re-elected in 1831. Re-elected in 1833. Re-elected in 1835. Re-elected in 1837. Re-elected in 1839. Re-elected in 1841. Died.	1823–1833 [data missing]
Lewis Williams (Panther Creek)	Anti-Jacksonian	March 4, 1825 – March 3, 1837	14th 15th 16th 17th 18th 19th 20th 21st 22nd 23rd 24th 25th 26th 27th	Elected in 1815. Re-elected in 1817. Re-elected in 1819. Re-elected in 1821. Re-elected in 1823. Re-elected in 1823. Re-elected in 1825. Re-elected in 1827. Re-elected in 1829. Re-elected in 1831. Re-elected in 1833. Re-elected in 1835. Re-elected in 1837. Re-elected in 1839. Re-elected in 1841. Died.	1833–1843 [data missing]
Lewis Williams (Panther Creek)	Whig	March 4, 1837 – February 23, 1842	14th 15th 16th 17th 18th 19th 20th 21st 22nd 23rd 24th 25th 26th 27th	Elected in 1815. Re-elected in 1817. Re-elected in 1819. Re-elected in 1821. Re-elected in 1823. Re-elected in 1823. Re-elected in 1825. Re-elected in 1827. Re-elected in 1829. Re-elected in 1831. Re-elected in 1833. Re-elected in 1835. Re-elected in 1837. Re-elected in 1839. Re-elected in 1841. Died.	1833–1843 [data missing]
Vacant		February 23, 1842 – April 27, 1842	27th		1833–1843 [data missing]
Anderson Mitchell (Wilkesboro)	Whig	April 27, 1842 – March 3, 1843	27th	Elected to finish Williams's term. Redistricted to the 3rd district and lost re-election.	1833–1843 [data missing]
District dissolved March 4, 1843
District re-established January 3, 2003
Brad Miller (Raleigh)	Democratic	January 3, 2003 – January 3, 2013	108th 109th 110th 111th 112th	Elected in 2002. Re-elected in 2004. Re-elected in 2006. Re-elected in 2008. Re-elected in 2010. Retired.	2003–2013
George Holding (Raleigh)	Republican	January 3, 2013 – January 3, 2017	113th 114th	Elected in 2012. Re-elected in 2014. Redistricted to the 2nd district.	2013–2017
Ted Budd (Advance)	Republican	January 3, 2017 – January 3, 2023	115th 116th 117th	Elected in 2016. Re-elected in 2018. Re-elected in 2020. Retired to run for U.S. senator.	2017–2021
Ted Budd (Advance)	Republican	January 3, 2017 – January 3, 2023	115th 116th 117th	Elected in 2016. Re-elected in 2018. Re-elected in 2020. Retired to run for U.S. senator.	2021–2023
Wiley Nickel (Cary)	Democratic	January 3, 2023 – January 3, 2025	118th	Elected in 2022. Retired due to redistricting.	2023–2025
Brad Knott (Raleigh)	Republican	January 3, 2025 – present	119th	Elected in 2024. Lost re-election.	2025–present
Paul Barringer; Sanford	Democratic	Taking office on January 3, 2027		Elected in 2026.	

== Past election results ==
=== 2002 ===
2002 North Carolina's 13th congressional district election
Party	Candidate	Votes	%
Democratic	Brad Miller	100,287	54.72
Republican	Carolyn W. Grant	77,688	42.39
Libertarian	Alex MacDonald	5,295	2.89
Turnout		183,270	100.00
Democratic win (new seat)			

=== 2004 ===
2004 North Carolina's 13th congressional district election
Party	Candidate	Votes	%
Democratic	Brad Miller (incumbent)	160,896	58.79
Republican	Virginia Johnson	112,788	41.21
Turnout		273,684	100.00
Democratic hold			

=== 2006 ===
2006 North Carolina's 13th congressional district election
Party	Candidate	Votes	%
Democratic	Brad Miller (incumbent)	98,540	63.71
Republican	Vernon Robinson	56,120	36.29
Turnout		154,660	100.00
Democratic hold			

=== 2008 ===
2008 North Carolina's 13th congressional district election
Party	Candidate	Votes	%
Democratic	Brad Miller (incumbent)	221,379	65.93
Republican	Hugh Webster	114,383	34.07
Turnout		335,762	100.00
Democratic hold			

=== 2010 ===
2010 North Carolina's 13th congressional district election
Party	Candidate	Votes	%
Democratic	Brad Miller (incumbent)	116,103	55.50
Republican	Bill Randall	93,099	44.50
Total votes		209,202	100.00
Democratic hold			

=== 2012 ===
2012 North Carolina's 13th congressional district election
Party	Candidate	Votes	%
Republican	George Holding	210,495	56.8
Democratic	Charles Malone	160,115	43.2
Total votes		370,610	100.0
Republican gain from Democratic			

=== 2014 ===
2014 North Carolina's 13th congressional district election
Party	Candidate	Votes	%
Republican	George Holding (incumbent)	153,991	57.3
Democratic	Brenda Cleary	114,718	42.7
Total votes		268,709	100.0
Republican hold			

=== 2016 ===
2016 North Carolina's 13th congressional district election
Party	Candidate	Votes	%
Republican	Ted Budd	199,443	56.1
Democratic	Bruce Davis	156,049	43.9
Total votes		355,492	100.0
Republican hold			

=== 2018 ===
2018 North Carolina's 13th congressional district election
Party	Candidate	Votes	%
Republican	Ted Budd (incumbent)	147,570	51.5
Democratic	Kathy Manning	130,402	45.6
Libertarian	Tom Bailey	5,513	1.9
Green	Robert Corriher	2,831	1.0
Total votes		286,316	100.0
Republican hold			

=== 2020 ===
2020 North Carolina's 13th congressional district election
Party	Candidate	Votes	%
Republican	Ted Budd (incumbent)	267,181	68.2
Democratic	Scott Huffman	124,684	31.8
Total votes		391,865	100.0
Republican hold			

=== 2022 ===
2022 North Carolina's 13th congressional district election
Party	Candidate	Votes	%
Democratic	Wiley Nickel	143,090	51.6
Republican	Bo Hines	134,256	48.4
Total votes		277,346	100.0
Democratic gain from Republican			

=== 2024 ===
2024 North Carolina's 13th congressional district election
Party	Candidate	Votes	%
Republican	Brad Knott	243,655	58.6
Democratic	Frank Pierce	171,835	41.4
Total votes		415,490	100.0
Republican gain from Democratic			

=== 2026 ===
2026 North Carolina's 13th congressional district election
Party	Candidate	Votes	%
Republican	Brad Knott		
Democratic	Paul Barringer		
Green	Anthony Aguilar		
Libertarian	Steven Swinton		
Total votes			

== See also ==
- List of United States congressional districts
- North Carolina's congressional districts
