= 2008 North Carolina Council of State election =

- November 4, 2008

All 10 members of the North Carolina Council of State
	Majority party	Minority party
Party	Democratic	Republican
Last election	7	3
Seats won	8	2
Seat change	▲1	▼1
Percentage	53.23%	46.4%

Elections were held in North Carolina to choose members of the Council of State (who head various executive branch departments) were held November 4, 2008. This coincided with the presidential, U.S. Senate, U.S. House, gubernatorial, and statewide judicial elections.

Primary elections were held on May 6, 2008, for races in which more than one candidate filed for a party's nomination.

One of the results of the general election was that women held a majority (six of 10) of the seats on the Council of State for the first time. Only one incumbent, Republican state auditor Les Merritt, was defeated. Democrats held the open races for governor, lieutenant governor, treasurer, and insurance commissioner.

== Governor of North Carolina ==
Governor Mike Easley term-limited, so he was not able to run for a third consecutive term as governor. Lieutenant Governor Bev Perdue won the Democratic primary, and Charlotte mayor Pat McCrory won the Republican primary. Michael Munger was the nominee of the Libertarian Party.

Purdue defeated McCrory in the general election with 50.3% of the vote to McCrory's 46.9%. Perdue was the first female governor of North Carolina.

== Lieutenant Governor of North Carolina ==
Lt. Governor Bev Perdue was term-limited and decided to run for governor. State Senator Walter Dalton won the Democratic primary, and State Senator Robert Pittenger won the Republican primary. Phillip Rhodes was nominated by the Libertarian Party.

In the general election, Dalton defeated Pittenger. Dalton received 51.1% of the vote and Pittenger received 45.9%.

== Secretary of State ==
Incumbent Secretary of State Elaine Marshall (Democratic) defeated attorney Jack Sawyer (Republican) on November 4, 2008.

2008 North Carolina Secretary of State election
Party	Candidate	Votes	%	±%
Democratic	Elaine F. Marshall (incumbent)	2,291,980	56.80	–0.52
Republican	Jack Sawyer	1,743,158	43.20	+0.52
Turnout		4,079,831	65.53	

Results by county Marshall: 50–60%; 60–70%; 70–80%; Sawyer: 50–60%; 60–70%

== State Auditor ==
Incumbent Auditor Les Merritt (Republican) was defeated by Beth Wood, Former Director of Training for the North Carolina Office of the State Auditor on November 4, 2008. Wood had previously defeated Fred Aikens, a retired state employee and retired colonel in the North Carolina Army National Guard, in the Democratic primary. Wood won approximately 65% of the vote in the primary.

2008 North Carolina state auditor election
Party	Candidate	Votes	%	±%
Democratic	Beth A. Wood	2,175,242	53.57	+4.01
Republican	Leslie Merritt (incumbent)	1,885,229	46.43	–4.01
Turnout		4,060,471	65.22	

Results by county Wood: 50–60%; 60–70%; 70–80%; Merritt: 50–60%; 60–70%; 70–80%

== Attorney General ==
Incumbent attorney general Roy Cooper (Democratic) defeated Bob Crumley (Republican), an attorney and owner of Crumley and Associates.

2008 North Carolina Attorney General election
Party	Candidate	Votes	%	±%
Democratic	Roy Cooper (incumbent)	2,538,178	61.10	+5.49
Republican	Bob Crumley	1,615,762	38.90	–5.49
Turnout		4,153,940	66.72	

Results by county Cooper: 50–60%; 60–70%; 70–80%; 80–90%; Crumley: 50–60%; 60–70%

== State Treasurer ==
Incumbent Richard H. Moore (Democratic) announced on May 22, 2007, that he would seek the 2008 Democratic nomination for governor.

Candidates to succeed him included three Democrats—state Sen. Janet Cowell, Michael Weisel, and Buncombe County Commissioner David Young—and one Republican, state Rep. Bill Daughtridge.

Cowell won the Democratic primary with approximately 46 percent of the vote. Young came in second, with 36 percent.

On November 4, 2008, Janet Cowell defeated Bill Daughtridge.

2008 North Carolina State Treasurer election
Party	Candidate	Votes	%	±%
Democratic	Janet Cowell	2,179,665	53.62	–0.89
Republican	Bill Daughtridge	1,885,724	46.38	+0.89
Turnout		4,065,389	65.29	

Results by county Cowell: 50–60%; 60–70%; 70–80%; Daughtridge: 50–60%; 60–70%

== Superintendent of Public Instruction ==
Incumbent Superintendent June Atkinson (Democratic) won renomination by defeating North Carolina Association of Educators president Eddie Davis in the Democratic primary (with about 53 percent of the vote). Republicans Joe Johnson and Eric H. Smith lost to former state House co-Speaker Richard T. Morgan in the Republican primary.

On November 4, 2008, Atkinson defeated Richard Morgan.

2008 North Carolina Superintendent of Public Instruction election
Party	Candidate	Votes	%	±%
Democratic	June Atkinson	2,177,934	53.66	+3.53
Republican	Richard T. Morgan	1,881,075	46.34	–3.53
Turnout		4,059,009	65.19	

Results by county Atkinson: 50–60%; 60–70%; 70–80%; Morgan: 50–60%; 60–70%

== Commissioner of Agriculture ==
Incumbent Commissioner Steve Troxler (Republican) defeated attorney Ronnie Ansley (Democratic).

2008 North Carolina Commissioner of Agriculture election
Party	Candidate	Votes	%	±%
Republican	Steve Troxler	2,130,146	52.05	+2.01
Democratic	Ronnie Ansley	1,962,741	47.95	–2.01
Turnout		4,092,887	65.74	

Results by county Troxler: 50–60%; 60–70%; 70–80%; Ansley: 50–60%; 60–70%; 70–80%

== Commissioner of Labor ==
Four Democrats -- Robin Anderson, chair of the State Personnel Commission, Ty Richardson, Mary Fant Donnan, a former N.C. Department of Labor official, and former Labor Commissioner John C. Brooks—filed to run against incumbent Commissioner Cherie Berry (Republican).

Mary Fant Donnan finished first, with almost 28 percent of the vote, in the May 6 primary. Brooks was the runner-up. Brooks called for a June 24 runoff, which was his right, because no candidate won more than 40 percent of the vote in the first primary. Donnan defeated Brooks in the runoff, with approximately 68 percent of the vote, becoming the Democratic nominee.

On November 4, 2008, Cherie Berry defeated Mary Fant Donnan.

2008 North Carolina Commissioner of Labor election
Party	Candidate	Votes	%	±%
Republican	Cherie Berry	2,065,095	50.61	–1.49
Democratic	Mary Fant Donnan	2,015,442	49.39	+1.49
Turnout		4,080,537	65.54	

Results by county Berry: 50–60%; 60–70%; 70–80%; Donnan: 50–60%; 60–70%; 70–80%

== Commissioner of Insurance ==
Incumbent Commissioner James E. Long (Democratic) surprised observers by not seeking another term. His chosen successor, assistant Commissioner and former state Rep. Wayne Goodwin, defeated David C. Smith in the Democratic primary by winning about 56 percent of the vote. John Odom, a former Raleigh city councilman, was the only Republican candidate. Mark McMains was the candidate of the Libertarian Party.

On November 4, 2008, Goodwin defeated Mark McMains and John Odom.

2008 North Carolina Commissioner of Insurance election
Party	Candidate	Votes	%	±%
Democratic	Wayne Goodwin	2,106,870	51.57	–6.07
Republican	John Odom	1,822,452	44.61	+2.25
Libertarian	Mark McMains	153,517	3.76	N/A
Other	Write-ins	2,358	0.06	N/A
Turnout		4,085,197	65.61	

Results by county Goodwin: 40–50%; 50–60%; 60–70%; 70–80%; Odom: 40–50%; 50–60%; 60–70%

== See also ==
- North Carolina Council of State elections: 1996, 2000, 2004, 2012, 2016.
