= David Young (North Carolina politician) =

American politician (born 1959)

David Wallace Young (born November 11, 1959, in Greensboro, North Carolina) is a businessman who served as Chairman of the North Carolina Democratic Party from 2009 through 2011.

Young is a former county commissioner in Buncombe County and served as the president of the North Carolina Association of County Commissioners. Since 2005, he has served on the University of North Carolina system board of governors. Young was a candidate for North Carolina State Treasurer in 2008. On May 6, 2008, Young lost the Democratic primary for Treasurer to Janet Cowell. In January 2009, he was elected chairman of the North Carolina Democratic Party, succeeding Jerry Meek. Following a disappointing showing by the party in the 2010 elections, Young announced he would not seek a second term as party chairman. He was succeeded by David Parker.
