= William G. Daughtridge Jr. =

American politician and businessman (1952–2019)

Secretary of the North Carolina Department of Administration
- In office 2013–2015
- Governor: Pat McCrory
- Preceded by: Moses Carey, Jr.
- Succeeded by: Kathryn L. Johnson

Member of the North Carolina House of Representatives from the 25th district
- In office January 1, 2003 – January 1, 2009
- Preceded by: Gene Arnold (Redistricting)
- Succeeded by: Randy Stewart

Personal details
- Born: December 19, 1952 Rocky Mount, North Carolina, U.S.
- Died: September 2, 2019 (aged 66) Rocky Mount, North Carolina, U.S.
- Party: Republican
- Spouse: Partha Council
- Children: 2
- Education: University of North Carolina, Chapel Hill (BS, MBA)
- Profession: businessman

William Gray Daughtridge Jr. (December 19, 1952 – September 2, 2019) was a businessman from Rocky Mount, North Carolina, who served three terms from 2003 to 2008 as a Republican member of the North Carolina General Assembly representing the state's twenty-fifth House district, including constituents in Nash County.

Daughtridge's time in office ended with his 2008 bid for North Carolina Treasurer.

== Early life and education ==
Born in Rocky Mount, Daughtridge was president of an oil distribution/transportation/retail company formed by his grandfather in 1929. He earned BS and MBA degrees at UNC-Chapel Hill, where he was a Morehead Scholar. Daughtridge has served on the North Carolina Economic Development Board, the Travel and Tourism Board and was appointed to numerous economic development positions while serving in the Legislature. In addition, Daughtridge served on the UNC Board of Governors as the Vice Chair of Budget, and Chair of Governance. Daughtridge served in the North Carolina National Guard from 1972 to 1978.

== Political career ==
While in office, his appointments included serving as the Commerce Committee Chairman, Small Business and Entrepreneurship Vice Chairman and serving as Co-Chair on the Joint Select Committee UNC Board of Governors and Economic Growth Development. Daughtridge ran for North Carolina State Treasurer in 2008. His only opponent in the primary election, State Representative Dale Folwell, dropped out. Daughtridge lost in the general election to Democratic State Senator Janet Cowell.

In 2011, Daughtridge became a senior advisor to new Speaker of the North Carolina House of Representatives Thom Tillis. In 2013, newly elected Governor Pat McCrory appointed him to serve as his Secretary of Administration.

He died in Rocky Mount on September 2, 2019, at the age of 66.

Party political offices
Preceded by Edward Meyer	Republican nominee for North Carolina State Treasurer; 2008	Succeeded by Steve Royal
North Carolina House of Representatives
Preceded by Cary Allred; W. B. Teague; Nelson Cole	Member of the North Carolina House of Representatives from the 25th district 2003-2009	Succeeded by Randy Stewart
