= Ed Turlington =

American lawyer

Ed Turlington is an American lawyer and Democratic Party activist. He is an at-large member of the Democratic National Committee, since his election in 2009.

A Democratic Party activist since the age of 15 in Sampson County, Turlington served as a senior aide to Governors Terry Sanford, Jim Hunt, and Lieutenant Governor Robert B. Jordan, as well as the North Carolina Democratic Party's executive director. He was Campaign Manager for Hunt's successful 1996 reelection campaign in North Carolina. With Hunt's backing, Turlington ran unsuccessfully for chairman of the North Carolina Democratic Party in 2005, losing to Jerry Meek.

Turlington was National General Chair of Senator John Edwards's 2004 presidential campaign and advised his 2008 campaign. He was Deputy Campaign Manager of Bill Bradley's 2000 run for the same office. He attended the 1976, 2000 and 2004 Democratic National Conventions as a delegate from North Carolina. He served as a member of the Democratic National Committee (DNC)'s Commission on the Presidential Nominating Calendar in 2005.

Turlington holds an undergraduate degree from Duke University and received his J.D. degree from the University of North Carolina at Chapel Hill.

Ed Turlington is Henry Turlington's father.
