= Jerry Meek =

American lawyer and activist

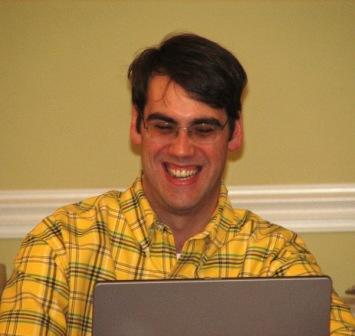
Meek in 2007

Jerry Meek (born 1970) is a North Carolina business and tax litigation attorney and Democratic Party activist who was the chairman of the North Carolina Democratic Party from 2005 through 2009.

== Life and career ==
Jerry Meek became involved in Democratic Party politics at age 13, as a volunteer for Democratic nominees in the 1984 election. As a teenager, he served as President of the State and National Teen Democrats. At age 17, he was elected as the youngest delegate ever elected to a Democratic National Convention.

After graduating from high school, he attended Duke University. Three and a half years later, he graduated magna cum laude and Phi Beta Kappa from Duke, double majoring in Economics and Political Science. Meek then won a fellowship to study at the University of Notre Dame, where he completed a master's degree in government. In the fall of 1995, Meek returned to North Carolina to attend Duke Law School, completing his law degree in 1997.

While in college, Meek served as a precinct chair in the Cumberland County Democratic Party and as an officer in the 7th Congressional District Democratic Party. At age 25, Meek was elected Chairman of the Cumberland County Democratic Party, an office he held while commuting from Fayetteville to Durham to attend Duke Law School. In 1998, Meek was the Democratic nominee for the North Carolina House of Representatives from Cumberland County's 18th House District.

Between 1999 and 2002, Meek was a partner with a Dallas, Texas-based law firm, practicing in the area of mental health law. In 2002, Meek returned to work for a Fayetteville firm, while running the Cumberland County Democratic Party's coordinated campaign for the fall of 2002 election.

In February 2003, Meek was elected First Vice Chair of the North Carolina Democratic Party. In February 2005, he was elected Chair of the North Carolina Democratic Party over Ed Turlington. He was unanimously re-elected to another 2-year term in January 2007.

As State Chair, Meek worked aggressively to rebuild the State Party's grassroots network, to expand services and support to local party organizations, to make better use of technology, and to encourage new people – especially young people – to become active in the Democratic Party. He retired as party chair in 2009, and was succeeded by David Young.

In 2011, Meek graduated with distinction from Georgetown University Law Center, with an LLM in Tax Law.

In 2012, after four years as a partner at Poyner Spruill LLP, Meek opened his own law firm in the Charlotte area. He continues to primarily represent clients in business and tax matters.

Party political offices
Preceded by Barbara Allen	Chair of the North Carolina Democratic Party; 2005–2009	Succeeded by David Young
