= Dale Folwell =

American politician (born 1958)

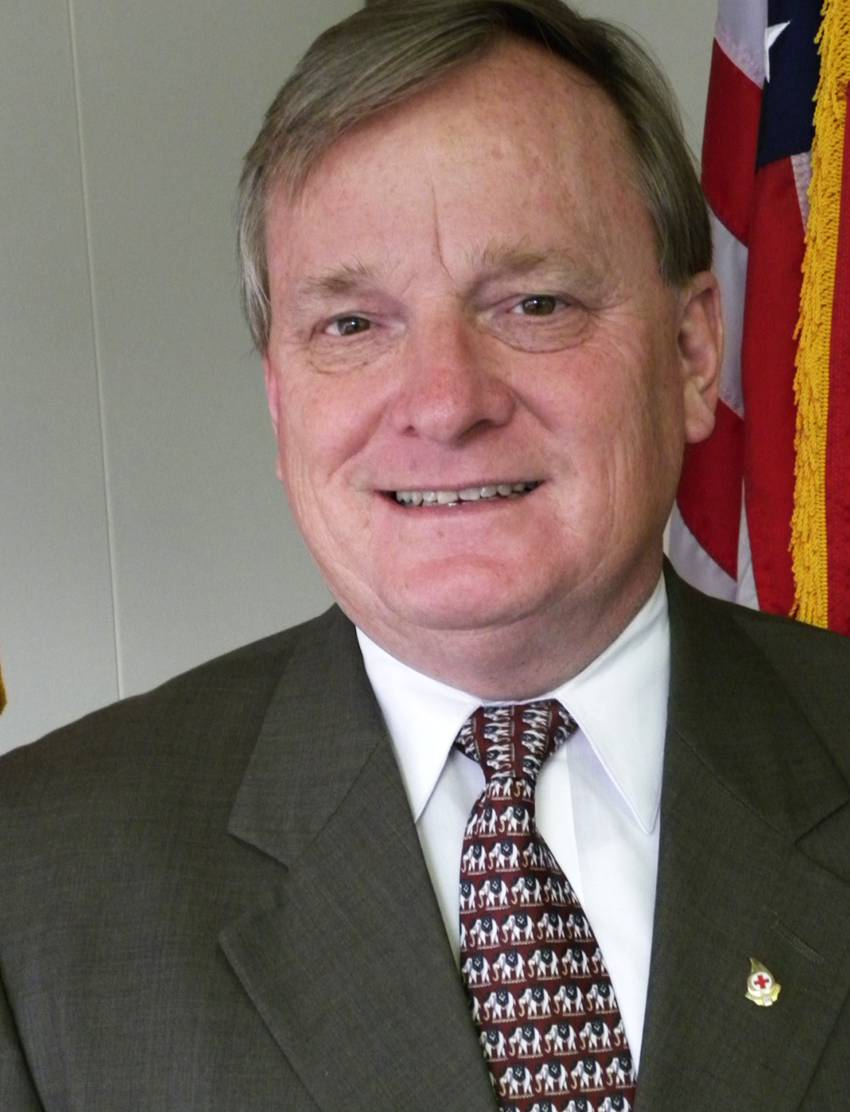

28th Treasurer of North Carolina
- In office January 1, 2017 – January 1, 2025
- Governor: Roy Cooper
- Preceded by: Janet Cowell
- Succeeded by: Brad Briner

Speaker pro tempore of the North Carolina House of Representatives
- In office January 1, 2011 – January 1, 2013
- Leader: Thom Tillis
- Preceded by: William Wainwright
- Succeeded by: Paul Stam

Member of the North Carolina House of Representatives from the 74th district
- In office January 1, 2005 – January 1, 2013
- Preceded by: Constituency established
- Succeeded by: Debra Conrad

Personal details
- Born: Dale Robbins Folwell; December 17, 1958 (age 67) Raleigh, North Carolina, U.S.
- Party: Republican
- Education: University of North Carolina, Greensboro (BS, MS)

Dale Robbins Folwell (born December 17, 1958) is an American politician who served as the North Carolina State Treasurer from 2017 to 2025. A Republican from Winston-Salem, North Carolina, Folwell spent four terms in North Carolina House of Representatives, including a term as speaker pro tempore from 2011 to 2013. He was head of the state's Division of Employment Security in the administration of Governor Pat McCrory from 2013 to 2015. He was elected State Treasurer in the 2016 election, taking office on January 1, 2017. Folwell was reelected to a second term in 2020, defeating Democratic challenger Ronnie Chatterji. In 2024 he mounted an unsuccessful campaign to be elected governor.

== Education and career before politics ==
Folwell graduated from the University of North Carolina at Greensboro in 1984 with a Bachelor of Science in accounting. He worked as an accountant. He also received a master's degree in accounting from UNC Greensboro. He is a certified public accountant, and also worked as a gas station attendant, custodian, trash collector, and as an investment advisor for Deutsche Bank.

== Political career ==
=== School board ===
Folwell was a member of the Winston-Salem/Forsyth County Board of Education from 1993 to 2000.

=== State House ===
In 2004 Folwell was elected to the North Carolina House of Representatives receiving 62.9% of votes. He took office in 2005 and ultimately served four terms. From 2007-2008, Folwell was Joint Republican Caucus Leader. He was elected speaker pro tempore for the 2011-2012 session, working with House Speaker Thom Tillis.

Folwell gained a reputation for social conservatism, and in the state House was a vocal proponent of the legislation that in 2012 placed Amendment 1, a state constitutional amendment to ban same-sex marriage and civil unions, on the state ballot.

During his time in the state House, Folwell was the sponsor of 29 bills that became law. Most were uncontroversial; in 2012, Folwell said that 20 of the bills that he sponsored passed with 4,098 "yes" votes to 175 "no" votes. Among the Folwell-sponsored legislation that became law was an update to state organ donation law. Folwell also sponsored a bill that fundamentally altered the state's worker's compensation laws. The legislation, favored by business groups, was a bipartisan effort that involved a cap on some benefits and an extension on others. Folwell framed the legislation as a necessary reform that controlled costs and fraud; critics "said the reform potentially allows insurance companies to force injured workers into very low-paying occupations without giving fair consideration to pre-injury earnings."

Folwell supported redistricting reform legislation in 2011. In June 2011, Folwell initially voted in favor of controversial legislation (House Bill 810) to allow short-term consumer loans with high effective annual interest rates (up to 50%); two weeks later, Folwell asked that the official record to be modified to reflect that he voted "no," explaining that he changed his mind upon further consideration. Also in 2011, Folwell backed a Republican budget plan that would cut $400 million from Governor Perdue's budget proposal for K-12 education (which already recommended a $350 million cut), dismantle a significant portion of the North Carolina Department of Environment and Natural Resources, raise certain fees (on driver education courses, GED courts, and ferry tolls), and discontinue the extra penny on state sales tax.

A 2010 ranking of the non-partisan North Carolina Center for Public Policy Research ranked Folwell 38th in effectiveness in the House, down from 32nd the prior session. He was highly rated by the business advocacy group North Carolina Free Enterprise Foundation and the right-wing group Civitas Action, which rated him the most conservative member of the House.

=== Unsuccessful campaigns for state treasurer and lieutenant governor ===
In 2008, Folwell sought the Republican nomination for state treasurer, but dropped out of the race (the nomination was ultimately run by Bill Daughtridge, who lost to Janet Cowell).

In December 2011, Folwell announced that he would not seek election to a fifth term in the North Carolina state House. Instead, he ran for the 2012 Republican nomination for lieutenant governor against Dan Forest and Tony Gurley. Folwell was defeated in the May 2012 Republican primary.

=== North Carolina Assistant Secretary of Commerce ===
In March 2013, Secretary of Commerce Sharon Decker named Folwell to the post of Assistant Secretary of Employment Security at the North Carolina Department of Commerce; in that role, Folwell oversaw the department's Division of Employment Security. Folwell gained a reputation as reformer, although some of his actions were controversial. Over a 30-month period under Folwell, the North Carolina unemployment insurance system repaid a debt of $2.5 billion owed to the federal government, but did so by imposing an surcharge on employers and restricting unemployment benefits (by lowering both the amount of weekly payments and the number of weeks for which job-seekers were eligible to collect benefits). These changes made North Carolina one of the U.S. states with the lowest unemployment benefits, and were opposed by the state AFL-CIO. In 2014, under Folwell, the department also adopted a policy of requiring recipients of unemployment insurance benefits to attend a mandatory interview. In November 2015, Folwell resigned, publicly considering a run for state treasurer.

=== State Treasurer ===
In December 2015, Folwell announced his candidacy for the Republican nomination for North Carolina State Treasurer in the 2016 election. In the November 2016 election, Folwell faced Democratic nominee Dan Blue III, a consultant, lawyer, investment banker, and son of Dan Blue Jr. Folwell won, receiving 52.7% of the vote to Blue's 47.3%. Folwell took office on January 1, 2017. He became the first Republican to hold the office since David A. Jenkins served during the Reconstruction era from 1868 to 1876.

As state treasurer, Folwell promoted a controversial "Clear Pricing Plan" contract initiative, attempting to move State Health Plan participants to a pricing model that would tie all payments to Medicare, rather than negotiating reimbursement rate with health care providers. The plan would save money for the plan, but would also cause providers to be reimbursed for their services at lower, but still profitable, rates. The North Carolina Healthcare Association opposed the plan, while the State Employees Association of North Carolina supported it. Folwell ultimately lost a battle with the state legislature over his proposal.

Folwell ended State Health Plan coverage for gender dysphoria treatment for transgender and non-binary state employees. Folwell framed the move as a cost-cutting measure; the move was criticized by the LGBTQ advocacy group Equality NC, which called it discriminatory.

In mid-March 2020, Folwell (along with the other Republicans on the Council of State) opposed Governor Roy Cooper's closure of bars, and restriction of restaurants to take-out and delivery only, which Cooper had ordered to prevent the spread of coronavirus disease (COVID-19) during the COVID-19 pandemic in North Carolina. In March 2020, Folwell was hospitalized for five days after suffering from COVID-19. In April 2020, Folwell asked Cooper to modify his stay-at-home executive order to allow the Charlotte Motor Speedway to host a NASCAR race, the Coca-Cola 600, without an audience of fans.

Folwell successfully sought reelection in 2020. He had no opponent in the Republican primary election, and defeated Aaron Chatterji, a professor at Duke University's Fuqua School of Business and Sanford School of Public Policy and former Obama administration official, in the November election by a 52.6% to 47.4% margin.

Under Folwell's leadership, the state's treasury issued hundreds of thousands of dollars of debt to senior citizens who were overpaid retirement benefits by the state and were previously informed their pay was correct. In response, he stated "That’s a great point, but the dates that you mentioned are called 'pre-Dale' because I wasn’t the treasurer then."

Folwell was succeeded as treasurer by Brad Briner on January 2, 2025.

== Personal life ==
In May 1999, Folwell's 7-year-old son Dalton died after being hit by a car as he tried to board a school bus. Following the accident, he and his wife allowed their son to be an organ donor. Since then, Folwell has been an advocate for organ donation, and in 2012 completed a motorcycle ride of all 48 contiguous United States for the cause.

North Carolina House of Representatives
Preceded by William Wainwright	Speaker pro tempore of the North Carolina House of Representatives; 2011–2013	Succeeded by Paul Stam
Party political offices
Preceded by Steve Royal	Republican nominee for North Carolina State Treasurer; 2016, 2020	Succeeded by Brad Briner
Political offices
Preceded by Janet Cowell	Treasurer of North Carolina; 2017–2025	Succeeded by Brad Briner
