= Catherine Truitt =

24th North Carolina Superintendent of Public Instruction

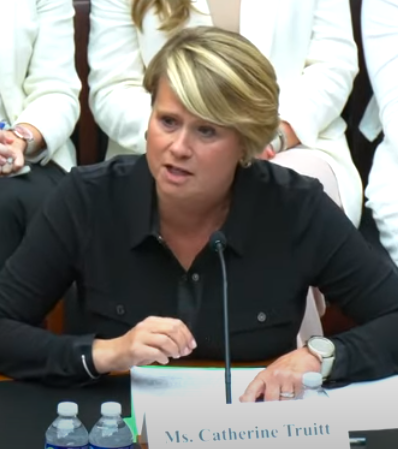
- Truitt in 2022

21st North Carolina Superintendent of Public Instruction
- In office January 2, 2021 – January 1, 2025
- Governor: Roy Cooper
- Preceded by: Mark Johnson
- Succeeded by: Mo Green

Personal details
- Born: 1970 or 1971 (age 55–56)
- Party: Republican
- Spouse: Jeff Truitt
- Children: 3
- Education: University of Maryland, College Park (BA); University of Washington (MEd)

Catherine Truitt (born 1970) is an American educator and politician who served as the 21st North Carolina superintendent of public instruction from January 2, 2021 until January 1, 2025. A member of the Republican Party, Truitt previously served as senior advisor on education to North Carolina governor Pat McCrory from 2015 to 2017. She has been the chancellor of the online Western Governors University North Carolina since its establishment in 2017. Truitt ran for reelection in 2024, but was defeated in the Republican primary by Michele Morrow.

== Education ==
Truitt studied English at the University of Maryland, where she earned a Bachelor of Arts degree in 1994. She went on to earn a Master of Education from the University of Washington in 1997.

== Career ==
=== Teaching career ===
According to Truitt, her husband Jeff's role in the U.S. Navy Reserves resulted in frequent moves, and she taught in a variety of locations, including at West Johnston High School in Benson, North Carolina from 2009 to 2012.

=== Senior education advisor to Governor McCrory ===
In October 2015, North Carolina governor Pat McCrory announced his selection of Truitt for senior education advisor to replace Eric Guckian, who left to work for the nonprofit Leadership for Educational Equity. In his announcement, McCrory said that Truitt's selection would "help us to build on the progress we’ve made to ensure every North Carolina student is equipped with the skills they need to begin a career or further their education." Truitt met with demonstrators during a June 2016 protest of McCrory's education policies.

She stayed in the role until McCrory left office after the 2016 gubernatorial election.

=== Western Governors University North Carolina ===
Truitt received an offer in 2017 to serve as chancellor of a new North Carolina affiliate of the online college Western Governors University. She accepted and the school was established in October 2017.

=== North Carolina superintendent of public instruction ===
In the run-up to the 2020 elections, Truitt said she would consider a run for North Carolina superintendent of public instruction if incumbent Mark Johnson did not run again. Johnson announced his bid for lieutenant governor in November 2019, and Truitt subsequently entered the race for state superintendent.

Truitt defeated state representative D. Craig Horn in the Republican primary. In the general election, Truitt defeated Democrat Jen Mangrum. She was sworn in on January 2, 2021, and repeated her oath at Governor Roy Cooper's inaugural ceremony on January 9.

Truitt ran for reelection in 2024, but was defeated in the Republican primary by Michele Morrow.

== Electoral history ==
North Carolina Superintendent of Public Instruction Republican primary election, 2020
| Party | Candidate | Votes | % |
|---|---|---|---|
| Republican | Catherine Truitt | 391,915 | 56.7 |
| Republican | D. Craig Horn | 299,578 | 43.3 |
| Total votes | | 691,493 | 100.0 |

North Carolina Superintendent of Public Instruction general election, 2020
| Party | Candidate | Votes | % | ±% |
|---|---|---|---|---|
| Republican | Catherine Truitt | 2,753,219 | 51.4 | +0.8% |
| Democratic | Jen Mangrum | 2,605,169 | 48.6 | −0.8% |
| Total votes | | 5,358,388 | 100.0 | |
| Republican hold | | | | |

North Carolina Superintendent of Public Instruction Republican primary election, 2024
| Party | Candidate | Votes | % |
|---|---|---|---|
| Republican | Michele Morrow | 457,151 | 52.1 |
| Republican | Catherine Truitt | 420,270 | 47.9 |
| Total votes | | 877,421 | 100.0 |

== Personal life ==
Truitt lives in Cary, North Carolina with her husband, Jeff Truitt, a reservist in the U.S. Navy. They have three children.

Party political offices
| Preceded by Mark Johnson | Republican nominee for North Carolina Superintendent of Public Instruction; 2020 | Succeeded by Michele Morrow |
Political offices
| Preceded by Mark Johnson | North Carolina Superintendent of Public Instruction; 2021–2025 | Succeeded by Mo Green |
