= Janet Cowell =

American politician (born 1968)

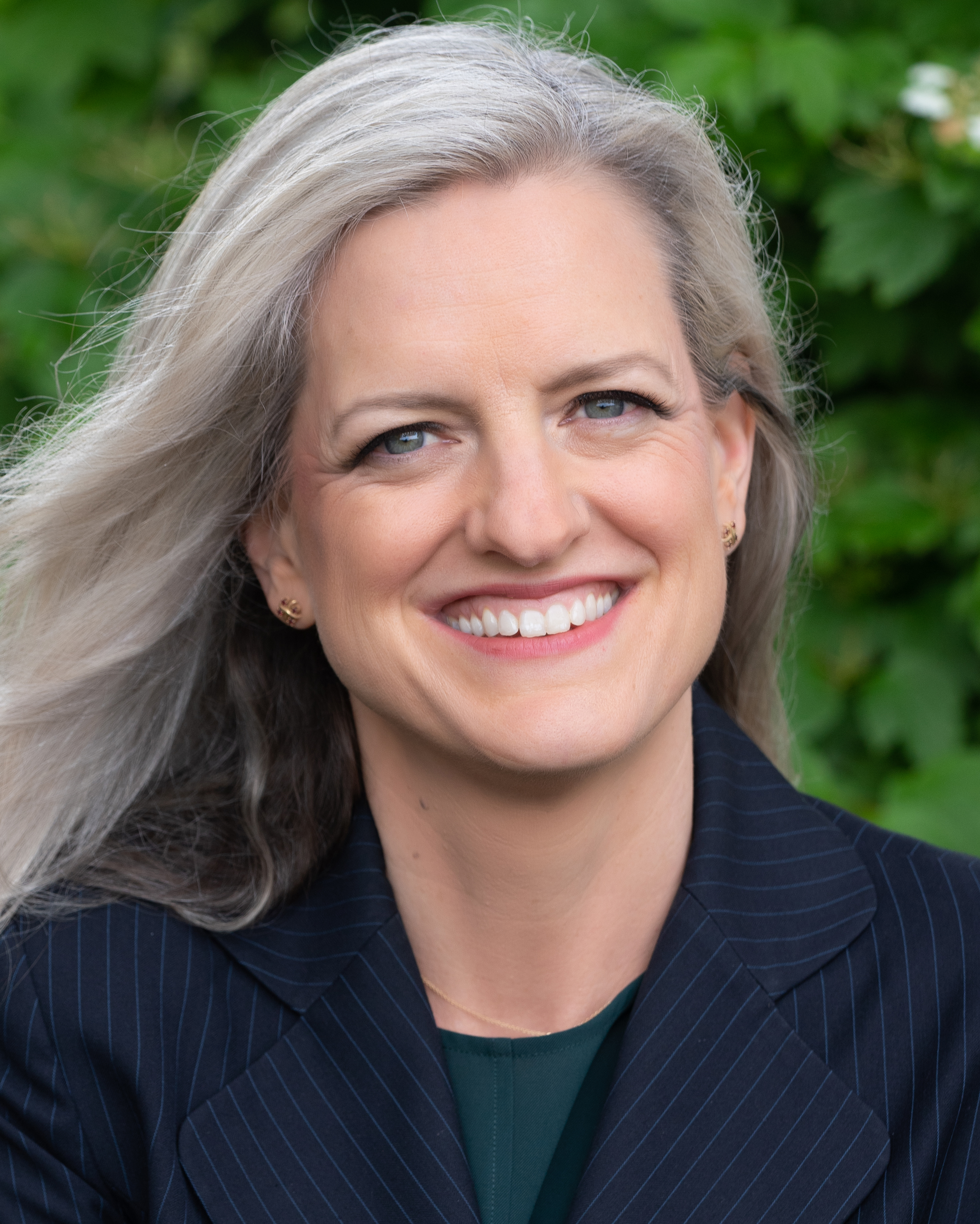
- Cowell in 2022

63rd Mayor of Raleigh
- Incumbent
- Assumed office December 2, 2024
- Preceded by: Mary-Ann Baldwin

27th Treasurer of North Carolina
- In office January 10, 2009 – January 1, 2017
- Governor: Bev Perdue; Pat McCrory
- Preceded by: Richard Moore
- Succeeded by: Dale Folwell

Member of the North Carolina Senate from the 16th district
- In office January 1, 2005 – January 1, 2009
- Preceded by: Eric Miller Reeves
- Succeeded by: Josh Stein

Personal details
- Born: July 19, 1968 (age 58) Memphis, Tennessee, U.S.
- Party: Democratic
- Education: University of Pennsylvania (BA, MA, MBA)

Janet Cowell (born July 19, 1968) is an American politician. She was elected the 63rd mayor of Raleigh, North Carolina on Nov. 5, 2024. She served as the North Carolina State Treasurer from 2009 to 2017, making her the first woman to hold that position in North Carolina. She was previously a two-term member of the Raleigh City Council and a two-term Democratic member of the North Carolina Senate, representing Wake County.

== Early life and education ==
Cowell was born in Memphis, Tennessee. She graduated from the University of Pennsylvania (BA), Penn's Wharton School of Business (MBA), and the Lauder Institute (Master's in International Studies).

== Career ==
Cowell previously worked as an analyst with HSBC and Lehman Brothers, coming to Raleigh, North Carolina in 1997. While in Raleigh she was also a consultant with SJF Ventures as well as Sibson & Co. and, in 2000, went to work for the Common Sense Foundation.

After declining to run for reelection as State Treasurer, Cowell was named CEO of Girls Who Invest, a nonprofit whose mission is to increase the number of women and people of color in leadership positions in the finance industry. In 2021, Cowell was selected to be president and CEO of the Dix Park Conservancy. Cowell helped raise $40 million in private funding to improve the park before resigning in October 2024 to run for mayor.

== Political career ==
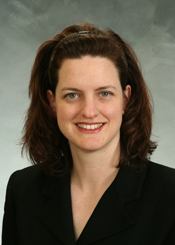
Cowell as a State Senator in 2005

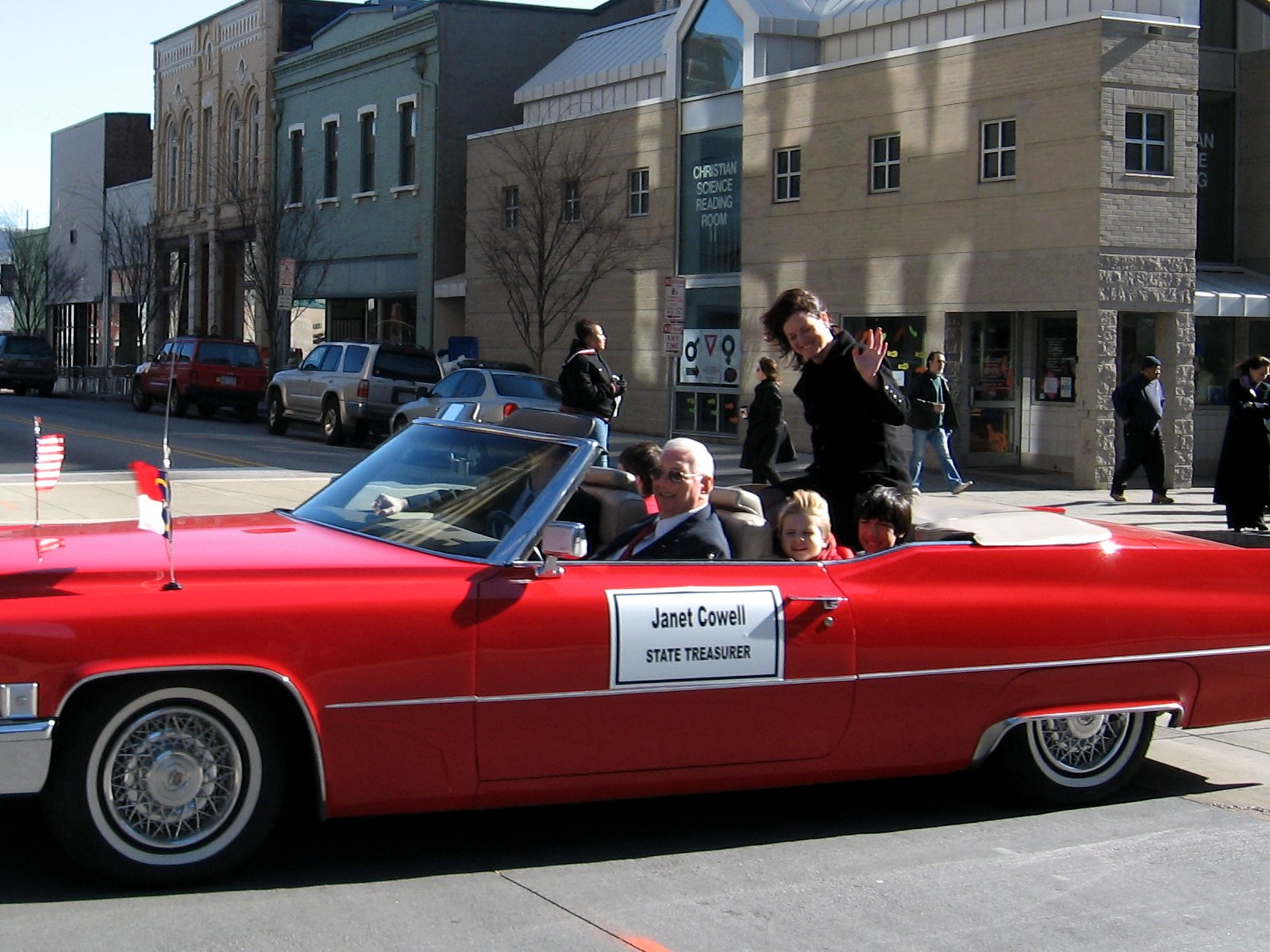
Cowell with family in 2009

In 2001 Cowell decided to run for Raleigh City Council. She was elected to one of the At-large seats along with Neal Hunt. She was re-elected with Hunt to the At-large seats in 2003.

In 2004, Cowell ran for the District 16 State Senate seat held by the retiring Eric Miller Reeves. Cowell won the Democratic party primary with 49% of the vote over Jack Nichols, Carter Worthy and Mike Shea. She went on to face Republican nominee Mark Bradrick, an insurance appraiser and Desert Storm veteran, and Libertarian Jason Mara in the general election. Cowell won the seat with 59% to 38% for Bradrick and 3% for Mara. She was completely unopposed in her 2006 re-election campaign.

=== State Treasurer ===
Cowell announced that she would seek the Democratic nomination for North Carolina State Treasurer in July 2007. She faced Michael Weisel, a Raleigh attorney, and David Young, a Buncombe County Commissioner, in the primary election, winning the nomination with 46.43% of the vote. In the 2008 general election, Cowell defeated the Republican nominee, businessman and former State House member Bill Daughtridge, 53.62% to 46.38%. She was sworn in on January 10, 2009. She was re-elected in 2012 over Republican Steve Royal, 53.83% to 46.17%.

On October 13, 2015, Cowell announced that she would not seek reelection or election to any other office in 2016.

=== Mayor of Raleigh ===
In 2024, Cowell ran for Mayor of Raleigh. She was elected on November 5, 2024, by a comfortable margin.

== Awards and honors ==
Jan 2010, Rodel Fellow in Public Leadership issued by Aspen Institute

July 2013, Cowell was ranked #21 globally on the Sovereign Wealth Fund Institute's Public Investor 100.

Jan 2014, Top 25 Global Investment Executive issued by Sovereign Wealth Fund Institute

Jan 2015, Institutional Trailblazer Award issued by Toigo Foundation

Feb 2017, Order of the Long Leaf Pine issued by the Governor of North Carolina

Feb 2023, Women Shaping Raleigh Award issued by Raleigh Magazine

== Electoral history ==
North Carolina State Senate 16th District Democratic primary election, 2004
Party	Candidate	Votes	%
Democratic	Janet Cowell	5,367	49.03
Democratic	Jack Nichols	2,641	24.13
Democratic	Carter Worthy	2,136	19.51
Democratic	Mike Shea	802	7.33

North Carolina State Senate 16th District Election, 2004
Party	Candidate	Votes	%
Democratic	Janet Cowell	45,396	59.44
Republican	Mark Bradrick	28,995	37.97
Libertarian	Jason Mara	1,979	2.59

North Carolina State Senate 16th District Election, 2006
Party	Candidate	Votes	%
Democratic	Janet Cowell (inc.)	30,330	100.00

North Carolina Treasurer Democratic primary election, 2008
Party	Candidate	Votes	%
Democratic	Janet Cowell	585,012	46.43
Democratic	David Young	456,272	36.21
Democratic	Michael Weisel	218,713	17.36

North Carolina Treasurer Election, 2008
Party	Candidate	Votes	%
Democratic	Janet Cowell	2,179,665	53.62
Republican	Bill Daughtridge	1,885,724	46.38

North Carolina Treasurer Democratic primary election, 2012
Party	Candidate	Votes	%
Democratic	Janet Cowell (inc.)	630,151	76.63
Democratic	Ron Elmer	192,134	23.37

North Carolina Treasurer Election, 2012
Party	Candidate	Votes	%
Democratic	Janet Cowell (inc.)	2,313,877	53.83
Republican	Steve Royal	1,984,827	46.17

Party political offices
Preceded by Richard H. Moore	Democratic nominee for Treasurer of North Carolina; 2008, 2012	Succeeded by Dan Blue
Political offices
Preceded by Richard Moore	Treasurer of North Carolina; 2009–2017	Succeeded by Dale Folwell
Preceded by Mary-Ann Baldwin	Mayor of Raleigh; 2024–present	Incumbent
