= June Atkinson =

American politician (born 1948)

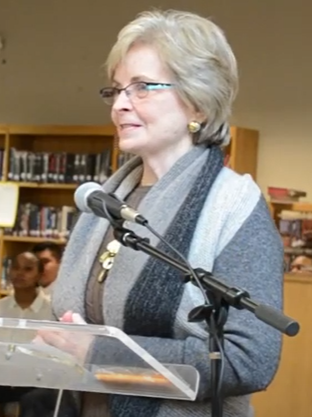
- Atkinson in 2016

North Carolina Superintendent of Public Instruction
- In office November 3, 2004 – January 1, 2017
- Governor: Mike Easley; Bev Perdue; Pat McCrory
- Preceded by: Patricia Willoughby
- Succeeded by: Mark Johnson

Personal details
- Born: August 19, 1948 (age 77) Moneta, Virginia, U.S.
- Party: Democratic
- Spouse: William Gurley
- Education: Radford University (BS); Virginia Polytechnic Institute and State University (MS); North Carolina State University (EdD)

June St. Clair Atkinson (born August 19, 1948) was elected North Carolina Superintendent of Public Instruction on November 3, 2004, in a race that was decided by the North Carolina General Assembly on August 23, 2005. She was re-elected in 2008 and 2012.

As State Superintendent, Atkinson organized and managed the North Carolina Department of Public Instruction (DPI), and was secretary and Chief Administrative Officer of the North Carolina State Board of Education. She was also an ex officio member of the North Carolina Council of State.

Atkinson was narrowly defeated in her bid for a fourth term by political newcomer Mark Johnson, losing the 2016 general election in North Carolina by about 1.2 percent, and left office on January 1, 2017. Atkinson was the longest-serving state superintendent in the country when she left office and she was also the first woman to be elected to that post in the State of North Carolina.

== Early life and education ==
Atkinson grew up in rural Bedford County, Virginia, where she attended public schools and graduated from Staunton River High School, Moneta, Virginia, in 1966. She received a B.S. in Business Education from Radford University in 1969, an M.S. in Vocational and Technical Education from Virginia Polytechnic Institute and State University in 1974, and a Doctorate in Educational Leadership and Policy from North Carolina State University in 1996. After graduating from Radford, Atkinson taught high school in Roanoke, Virginia, and Charlotte, North Carolina. In Charlotte, Atkinson's teaching assignment required that she work with business people to find meaningful employment for her students.

== Career ==
Atkinson worked for the North Carolina Department of Public Instruction for nearly 28 years (1976–2004) as a chief consultant and director in the areas of business education, career and technical education, and instructional services. A former business education teacher, Atkinson has been involved in instruction and curriculum development throughout her career.

Atkinson has made presentations to business and other educational groups in 43 states and throughout North Carolina. She is past president of the National Business Education Association, and past president of the Southern Regional Education Board's High Schools that Work in 1995-96 and 1996–97. Atkinson was elected by her colleagues to represent them as President of the National Association of State Directors of Career and Technical Education Consortium for 2001–2003.

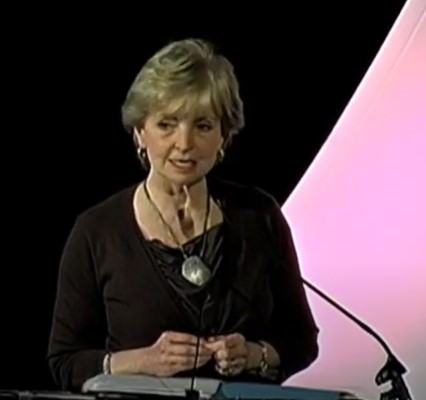
Atkinson speaking at a forum on STEM education in 2012

In 2009, Atkinson sued Gov. Beverly Perdue after the Governor appointed a Chief Executive Officer of the Public School-System, reducing Atkinson to an "ambassador for education." Atkinson contested under the Constitution of North Carolina and a Wake County, North Carolina superior court judge ruled in her favor on July 17, 2009.

Ahead of the 2012 general election, Atkinson was endorsed by the News and Observer editorial board, which wrote: "Test scores among the state’s public school students have improved, and Atkinson, a Democrat, is a strong advocate for ample education resources. Wake County school board member John Tedesco, Atkinson’s Republican challenger, had yard signs with the slogan 'Our students deserve better.' Well, yes. Tedesco no doubt is sincere in wanting to see all students succeed, but his policies in Wake would have cut against the interests of students from poor backgrounds. He also has played a role in turning the Wake board into a partisan battleground in an effort to advance GOP fortunes."

== Family ==
Atkinson is married to William Gurley, a Cary, North Carolina orthodontist and former assistant professor at the University of North Carolina at Chapel Hill School of Dentistry. She has one sister, two nephews and one niece. She is a member of The United Methodist Church.

== Electoral history ==
North Carolina Superintendent of Public Instruction Democratic Primary Election, 2004
Party	Candidate	Votes	%
Democratic	Marshall Stewart	135,348	35.19
Democratic	June Atkinson	132,041	34.33
Democratic	J. B. Buxton	117,274	30.49

North Carolina Superintendent of Public Instruction Democratic Primary Runoff Election, 2004
Party	Candidate	Votes	%
Democratic	June Atkinson	44,175	55.17
Democratic	Marshall Stewart	35,893	44.83

North Carolina Superintendent of Public Instruction Election, 2004
Party	Candidate	Votes	%
Democratic	June Atkinson	1,655,719	50.13
Republican	Bill Fletcher	1,647,184	49.87

North Carolina Superintendent of Public Instruction Democratic Primary Election, 2008
Party	Candidate	Votes	%
Democratic	June St. Clair Atkinson (inc.)	660,556	52.86
Democratic	Eddie Davis	589,126	47.14

North Carolina Superintendent of Public Instruction Election, 2008
Party	Candidate	Votes	%
Democratic	June St. Clair Atkinson (inc.)	2,177,934	53.66
Republican	Richard Morgan	1,881,075	46.34

North Carolina Superintendent of Public Instruction Election, 2012
Party	Candidate	Votes	%
Democratic	June Atkinson (inc.)	2,336,441	54.24
Republican	John Tedesco	1,971,049	45.76

North Carolina Superintendent of Public Instruction Democratic Primary Election, 2016
Party	Candidate	Votes	%
Democratic	June Atkinson (inc.)	776,302	79.78
Democratic	Henry Pankey	196,703	20.22

North Carolina Superintendent of Public Instruction Election, 2016
Party	Candidate	Votes	%
Democratic	June Atkinson (inc.)	2,231,903	49.40
Republican	Mark Johnson	2,285,783	50.60

Political offices
Preceded by Patricia N. Willoughby	North Carolina Superintendent of Public Instruction; 2004–2017	Succeeded by Mark Johnson
