= Mark Johnson (North Carolina politician) =

American politician

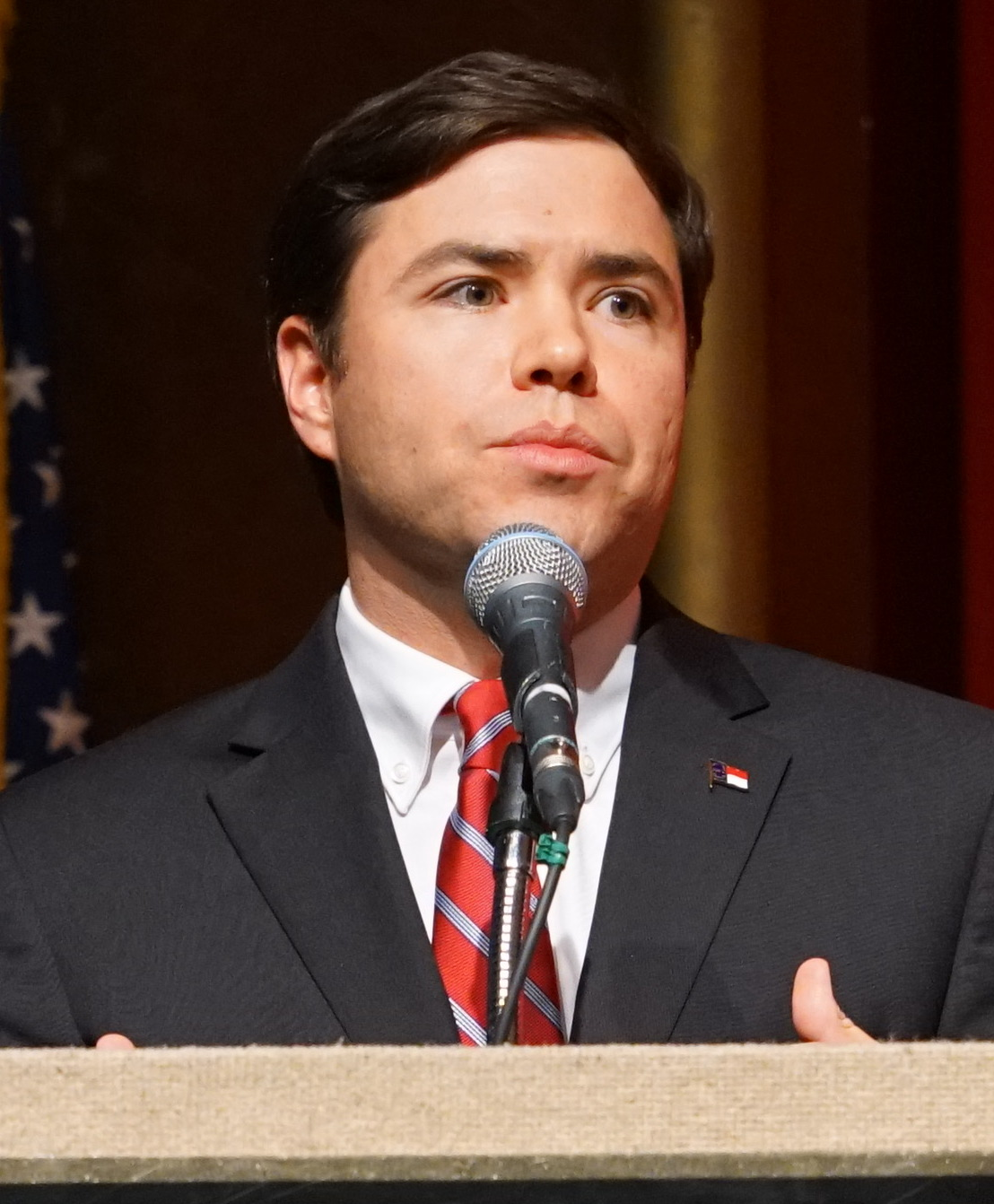

20th North Carolina Superintendent of Public Instruction
- In office January 1, 2017 – January 2, 2021
- Governor: Roy Cooper
- Preceded by: June Atkinson
- Succeeded by: Catherine Truitt

Personal details
- Born: 1982 or 1983 (age 41–42)
- Political party: Republican
- Spouse: Rachel Johnson
- Education: Emory University (BA); University of North Carolina, Chapel Hill (JD)

Mark Johnson (born 1982/1983) is an American attorney and politician who served as North Carolina's Superintendent of Public Instruction for one term. A Republican, he was first elected in 2016, narrowly defeating incumbent June Atkinson. Prior to his election as state superintendent, Johnson served for two years on the Forsyth County School Board while working as a lawyer in Winston-Salem. Prior to attending law school, Johnson taught at West Charlotte High School for two years with Teach for America. He unsuccessfully sought the Republican nomination for North Carolina lieutenant governor in 2020.

== Early life, education, and career before politics ==
Johnson grew up in Covington, Louisiana, the oldest of four sons. He graduated from the Louisiana School for Math, Science, and the Arts and then Emory University in Atlanta, receiving a bachelor's degree in environmental studies and political science. From 2006 to 2008, he taught science at West Charlotte High School, a high-poverty high school, through the Teach for America (TFA) program. He then attended the University of North Carolina at Chapel Hill's School of Law. Johnson became a technology lawyer in Winston-Salem, working as corporate counsel for international technology company Inmar.

== Political career ==
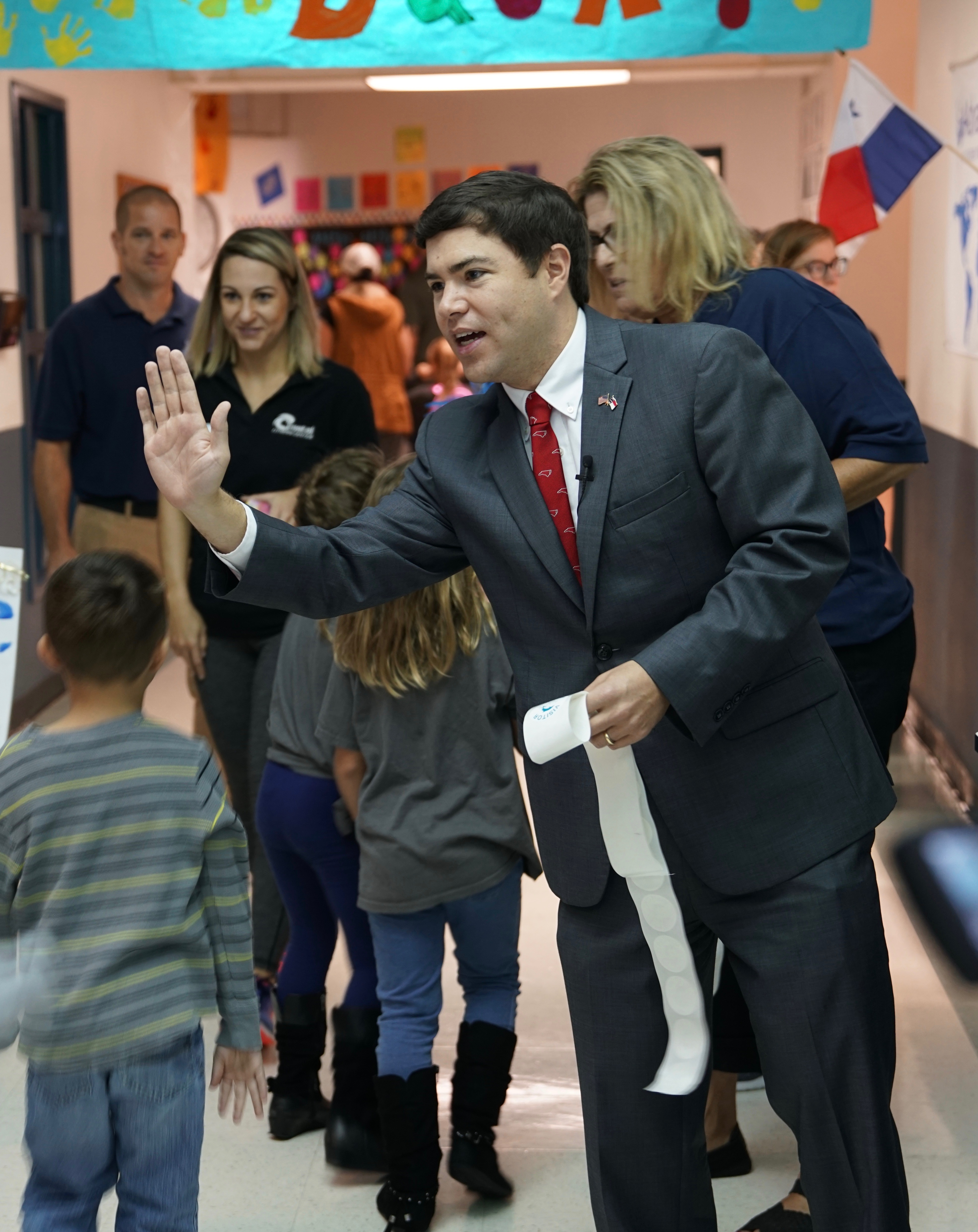
Johnson greeting students

He was elected in 2014 to an at-large seat on Forsyth County School Board and spent two years on the board. In August 2015, Johnson filed papers to run for the position of North Carolina Superintendent of Public Instruction in 2016. In the November 2016 election, Johnson won with 50.6% of the vote, narrowly defeating the Democratic incumbent June Atkinson. Atkinson had served 11 years in the post and had worked for the department for about 28 years before becoming superintendent. She was the longest-serving state superintendent in the nation. Johnson became the first Republican to win the position in more than a hundred years.

In 2019, Johnson supported a 5% salary increase for North Carolina teachers. He also proposed to increase funding for textbooks and digital media.

As superintendent, Johnson supported the creation of a new position of assistant superintendent for early childhood education and launched NC Reads, a statewide reading program. Prior to the start of the 2018 school year, Johnson announced that all K-3 teachers would be receiving new iPads as part of the state's "Read to Achieve" program using existing funds. Johnson announced changes to the state's standardized test procedures, including fewer questions on exams, "allowing students to leave the exams sooner and easing rules requiring exam proctors." Johnson also launched the "TeachNC" initiative (a joint effort between the Department of Public Instruction and the nonprofits Best NC and Teach.org, supported by grants from the Bill & Melinda Gates Foundation, IBM, Microsoft, and others, to improve teacher recruitment and retention. and a NC School Finances website to provide more transparency on school finances.

In partnership with the nonprofit Sandy Hook Promise, formed after the Sandy Hook Elementary School shooting in 2012, Johnson launched a "Say Something" app, allowing North Carolina students to anonymously report tips or incidents. Johnson has opposed the idea of arming North Carolina teachers with guns, an idea promoted by Donald Trump and others. However, Johnson does favor more funding for school resource officers.

Johnson was state superintendent during the COVID-19 pandemic in North Carolina, when schools were closed to control the spread of the virus.

When Johnson announced his candidacy for the Republican nomination for lieutenant governor, he described himself as "in the trenches fighting the deep state in state bureaucracy," referring to the State Board of Education. Johnson's relationship with the North Carolina State Board of Education was often tumultuous. In 2016, shortly after Johnson's election, the North Carolina General Assembly enacted legislation in a special session to shift power from the State Board of Education to the state superintendent, granting Johnson power over the $10 billion North Carolina education budget. This prompted a legal battle, culminating in a North Carolina Supreme Court decision, in which both sides claimed a partial victory.

In January 2020, Johnson and the board clashed over Johnson's signing of a contract for a personalized learning reading assessment tool designed for kindergartens through 3rd graders in support of the state's "Read To Achieve" program. The value of the contract was just below the dollar threshold requiring board approval, and a rival company that lost the contract subsequently filed a bid protest, contending that the software selected did not meet state requirements. After "a year of legal, political and academic wrangling" over the decision, Johnson and his staff at the Department created a plan in which school districts were given the power to choose the early-learning reading assessment tool they would use for the 2020–21 school year.

In February 2020, Johnson used a state database to send 540,000 text messages and 800,000 emails to parents and teachers, polling them about Common Core. The text message read, "NC Superintendent Johnson wants to remove Common Core from NC schools. Do you? Complete this survey to guide our work." The mass text prompted a few teachers and parents to file complaints against Johnson with the State Ethics Commission, alleging a politically motivated use of state resources to send a campaign-style message that coincided with the beginning of early voting in the North Carolina primary elections, in which Johnson was on the ballot in the race for the Republican nomination for lieutenant governor. The Department defended the use of a state database to send the texts and emails as it was a common practice of the department for many different parent and teacher surveys.

Johnson chose not to seek reelection as state superintendent, instead filing papers in December 2019 to seek the Republican nomination for North Carolina lieutenant governor in 2020. In the March 3, 2020 Republican primary, Johnson lost, coming in third place.

== Electoral history ==
North Carolina Superintendent of Public Instruction Election, 2016
Party	Candidate	Votes	%
Republican	Mark Johnson	2,285,783	50.60
Democratic	June Atkinson (incumbent)	2,231,903	49.40

North Carolina Lieutenant Governor Republican Primary, 2020
Party	Candidate	Votes	%
Republican	Mark Robinson	240,843	32.52
Republican	Andy Wells	107,824	14.56
Republican	Mark Johnson	89,200	12.04
Republican	John L. Ritter	85,023	11.48
Republican	Renee Ellmers	50,526	6.82
Republican	Greg Gebhardt	50,474	6.81
Republican	Deborah Cochran	48,234	6.51
Republican	Scott Stone	48,193	6.51
Republican	Buddy Bengel	20,395	2.75
Total votes		740,712	100.0%

Party political offices
Preceded by John Tedesco	Republican nominee for North Carolina Superintendent of Public Instruction; 2016	Succeeded by Catherine Truitt
Political offices
Preceded by June Atkinson	North Carolina Superintendent of Public Instruction; 2017–2021	Succeeded by Catherine Truitt
