= 2012 North Carolina Council of State election =

- November 6, 2012

All 10 members of the North Carolina Council of State
	Majority party	Minority party
Party	Democratic	Republican
Last election	8	2
Seats won	6	4
Seat change	▼2	▲2
Percentage	53.87%	46.08%
Swing	▲0.65%	▼0.32%

Elections were held in North Carolina on November 6, 2012, to select the nine officers of the North Carolina Council of State. This election coincided with the U.S. presidential election, U.S. House elections, the gubernatorial election and the statewide judicial elections. Primary elections were held on May 8, 2012; for races in which no candidate received 40 percent of the vote in the primary, runoff elections (officially known as "second" primaries) were held on July 17.

The nine members of the North Carolina Council of State are statewide-elected officers serving four-year terms. In the 2012 elections, all incumbents who ran for new terms were re-elected, while the Governor and Lieutenant Governor's seats were open following incumbent Bev Perdue's decision to retire, and Walter Dalton's decision to run for governor, respectively.

The partisan makeup of the Council of State changed from 8 Democrats and 2 Republicans before the election to 6 Democrats and 4 Republicans afterward, as Republicans flipped both the Governor and Lieutenant Governor.

== Governor ==
Republican Pat McCrory was elected governor.

== Lieutenant governor ==
Republican Dan Forest was elected lieutenant governor.

== Attorney general ==
Roy Cooper, the Democratic incumbent attorney general, ran for re-election unopposed.

=== Results ===
General election results
Party	Candidate	Votes	%
Democratic	Roy Cooper	2,828,941	100
Total votes		2,828,941	100

== Secretary of State ==
2012 North Carolina Secretary of State election
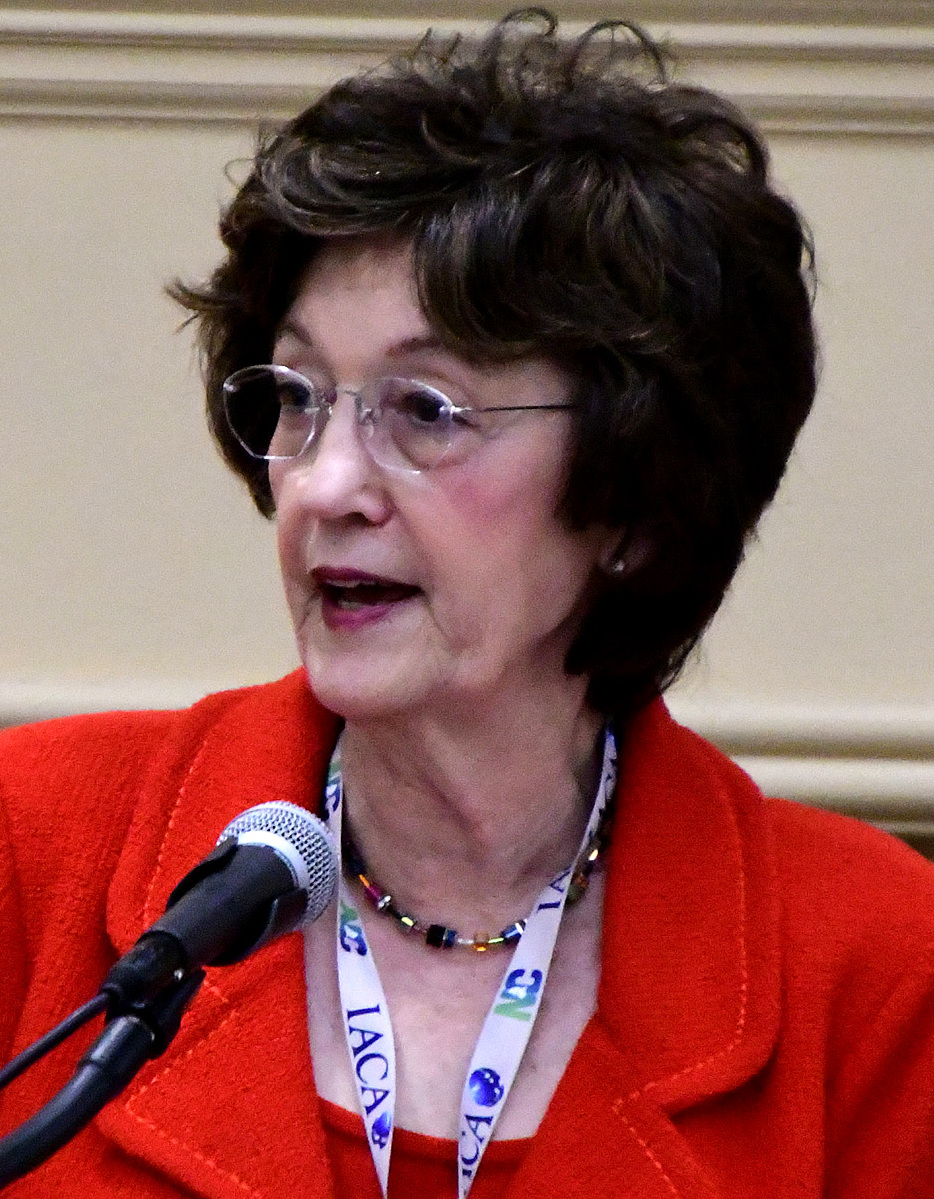

Nominee	Elaine Marshall	Ed Goodwin
Party	Democratic	Republican
Popular vote	2,331,173	2,003,026
Percentage	53.8%	46.2%
- Marshall: 50-60% 60-70% 70-80%; Goodwin: 50-60% 60-70% 70-80%
Secretary of State before election
Elaine Marshall
Democratic
Elected Secretary of State
Elaine Marshall
Democratic

=== Democratic primary ===
- Elaine Marshall, the Democratic incumbent Secretary of State, ran for re-election.

=== Republican primary ===
- Michael Beitler, business professor; Libertarian nominee for US Senator in 2010 (changed his registration to Republican to run for secretary of state)
- A.J. Daoud, business owner
- Kenn Gardner, former Wake County commissioner
- Ed Goodwin, Chowan County commissioner, retired Naval Criminal Investigative Service agent

==== Polling ====
Poll source	Date(s) administered	Sample size	Margin of error	Michael Beitler	A.J. Daoud	Kenn Gardner	Eddy Goodwin	Undecided
Public Policy Polling	May 5–6, 2012	496	± 4.4%	8%	11%	23%	14%	45%
Public Policy Polling	April 27–29, 2012	486	± 4.4%	7%	9%	20%	11%	52%
Public Policy Polling	April 20–22, 2012	521	± 4.3%	6%	6%	17%	10%	61%

==== Primary results ====
Republican primary results
Party	Candidate	Votes	%
Republican	Ed Goodwin	246,641	35.94
Republican	Kenn Gardner	204,630	29.82
Republican	Michael (Mike) Beitler	166,061	24.2
Republican	A. J. Daoud	68,834	10.03
Total votes		686,166	100

As no candidate received 40 percent of the vote, state law allows the runner-up to request a second primary (or "runoff"). Gardner requested a runoff.

Republican 2nd primary results
Party	Candidate	Votes	%
Republican	Ed Goodwin	74,252	54.48
Republican	Kenn Gardner	62,044	45.52
Total votes		136,296	100

=== General election ===
==== Polling ====
Poll source	Date(s) administered	Sample size	Margin of error	Elaine Marshall (D)	Ed Goodwin (R)	Undecided
Public Policy Polling	October 23–25, 2012	880 LV	± 3.3%	43%	38%	19%
Public Policy Polling	September 27–30, 2012	981	± 3.1%	41%	34%	24%
Public Policy Polling	August 2–5, 2012	813	± 3.4%	43%	37%	19%

==== Results ====
General election results
Party	Candidate	Votes	%
Democratic	Elaine Marshall	2,331,173	53.79
Republican	Ed Goodwin	2,003,026	46.21
Total votes		4,334,199	100

== State Auditor ==
2012 North Carolina State Auditor election
- November 6, 2012

Nominee	Beth Wood	Debra Goldman
Party	Democratic	Republican
Popular vote	2,299,541	1,981,539
Percentage	53.71%	46.29%
- Wood: 50–60% 60–70% 70–80%; Goldman: 50–60% 60–70% 70–80%
State Auditor before election
Beth Wood
Democratic
Elected State Auditor
Beth Wood
Democratic

=== Democratic primary ===
- Beth A. Wood, the Democratic incumbent State Auditor, ran for re-election.

=== Republican primary ===
- Joseph Hank DeBragga, auditor for North Carolina Department of Environment and Natural Resources
- Greg Dority, three-time congressional candidate, Beaufort County Republican Party chairman
- Debra Goldman, Wake County School Board member
- Fern Shubert, former state senator, former state representative, certified public accountant
- Rudy Wright, Mayor of Hickory, former certified public accountant

==== Polling ====
Poll source	Date(s) administered	Sample size	Margin of error	Joseph DeBragga	Greg Dority	Debra Goldman	Fern Shubert	Rudy Wright	Undecided
Public Policy Polling	May 5–6, 2012	496	± 4.4%	5%	16%	17%	11%	8%	44%
Public Policy Polling	April 27–29, 2012	486	± 4.4%	3%	18%	16%	9%	3%	51%
Public Policy Polling	April 20–22, 2012	521	± 4.3%	4%	11%	12%	7%	4%	61%

==== Primary results ====
Republican primary results
Party	Candidate	Votes	%
Republican	Debra Goldman	237,473	34.35
Republican	Greg Dority	164,647	23.82
Republican	Fern Shubert	126,983	18.37
Republican	Rudy Wright	108,037	15.63
Republican	Joseph Hank DeBragga	54,098	7.83
Total votes		691,238	100

As the runner-up, Dority chose not to request a runoff, making Goldman the nominee.

=== General election ===
==== Polling ====
Poll source	Date(s) administered	Sample size	Margin of error	Beth Wood (D)	Debra Goldman (R)	Undecided
Public Policy Polling	October 29–31, 2012	730	± 3.6%	50%	38%	12%
Public Policy Polling	October 23–25, 2012	880 LV	± 3.3%	45%	38%	18%
Public Policy Polling	August 31–September 1, 2012	1,012	± 3.1%	40%	38%	22%
Public Policy Polling	July 5–8, 2012	775	± 3.5%	39%	36%	25%
Public Policy Polling	June 7–10, 2012	810	± 3.4%	36%	36%	29%

==== Results ====
General election results
Party	Candidate	Votes	%
Democratic	Beth Wood	2,299,541	53.71
Republican	Debra Goldman	1,981,539	46.29
Total votes		4,281,080	100

== State Treasurer ==
2012 North Carolina State Treasurer election
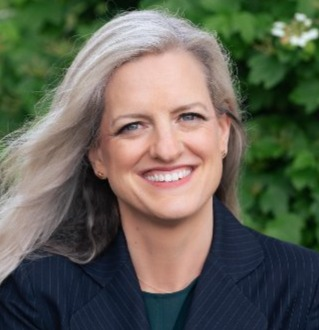

Nominee	Janet Cowell	Steve Royal
Party	Democratic	Republican
Popular vote	2,313,877	1,984,827
Percentage	53.8%	46.2%
- Cowell: 50-60% 60-70% 70-80% 80-90% Royal: 50-60% 60-70% 70-80%
State Treasurer before election
Janet Cowell
Democratic
Elected State Treasurer
Janet Cowell
Democratic

=== Democratic primary ===
- Janet Cowell, the Democratic incumbent State Treasurer, ran for re-election.
- Ron Elmer, investment consultant

==== Polling ====
Poll source	Date(s) administered	Sample size	Margin of error	Janet Cowell	Ron Elmer	Undecided
Public Policy Polling	April 27–29, 2012	500	± 4.4%	50%	11%	39%
Public Policy Polling	April 20–22, 2012	500	± 4.4%	38%	11%	51%
Public Policy Polling	March 23–25, 2012	505	± 4.36%	34%	12%	55%
Public Policy Polling	February 29–March 1, 2012	499	± 4.4%	32%	14%	54%

==== Primary results ====
Democratic primary results
Party	Candidate	Votes	%
Democratic	Janet Cowell	630,151	76.63
Democratic	Ron Elmer	192,135	23.37
Total votes		822,286	100

=== Republican primary ===
- Frank Roche, talk radio host
- Steve Royal, certified public accountant

==== Polling ====
Poll source	Date(s) administered	Sample size	Margin of error	Frank Roche	Steve Royal	Undecided
Public Policy Polling	May 5–6, 2012	496	± 4.4%	24%	30%	47%
Public Policy Polling	April 27–29, 2012	486	± 4.4%	17%	27%	57%

==== Primary results ====
Republican primary results
Party	Candidate	Votes	%
Republican	Steve Royal	389,188	57.69
Republican	Frank Roche	285,439	42.31
Total votes		674,627	100

=== General election ===
==== Polling ====
Poll source	Date(s) administered	Sample size	Margin of error	Janet Cowell (D)	Steve Royal (R)	Undecided
Public Policy Polling	October 29–31, 2012	730	± 3.6%	46%	41%	13%
Public Policy Polling	August 31–September 1, 2012	1,012	± 3.1%	42%	38%	20%
Public Policy Polling	July 5–8, 2012	775	± 3.5%	38%	35%	27%
Public Policy Polling	October 12–14, 2012	1,084	± 3%	34%	33%	33%

==== Results ====
General election results
Party	Candidate	Votes	%
Democratic	Janet Cowell	2,313,877	53.83
Republican	Steve Royal	1,984,827	46.17
Total votes		4,298,704	100

== Superintendent of Public Instruction ==
2012 North Carolina Superintendent of Public Instruction election
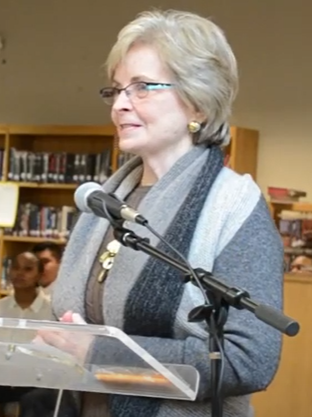

Nominee	June Atkinson	John Tedesco
Party	Democratic	Republican
Popular vote	2,336,441	1,971,049
Percentage	54.2%	45.7%
- Atkinson: 50-60% 60-70% 70-80% Tedesco: 50-60% 60-70% 70-80%
Superintendent of Public Instruction election before election
June Atkinson
Democratic
Elected Superintendent of Public Instruction election
June Atkinson
Democratic

=== Democratic primary ===
- June Atkinson, the Democratic incumbent Superintendent, ran for re-election.

Withdrawn Candidates

- Rick Glazier, state representative

=== Republican primary ===
- Richard Alexander, South Carolina teacher and former small business owner
- Mark Crawford, former state representative
- Ray Martin, teacher
- David Scholl, businessman and Union County School Board member
- John Tedesco, Wake County School Board member

==== Polling ====
Poll source	Date(s) administered	Sample size	Margin of error	Richard Alexander	Mark Crawford	Ray Martin	David Scholl	John Tedesco	Undecided
Public Policy Polling	May 5–6, 2012	496	± 4.4%	14%	12%	6%	6%	16%	45%
Public Policy Polling	April 27–29, 2012	486	± 4.4%	13%	8%	5%	6%	16%	52%
Public Policy Polling	April 20–22, 2012	521	± 4.3%	13%	6%	5%	4%	16%	57%

==== Primary results ====
Republican primary results
Party	Candidate	Votes	%
Republican	John Tedesco	195,352	28.35
Republican	Richard Alexander	167,354	24.28
Republican	Mark Crawford	150,404	21.82
Republican	Ray E. Martin	90,889	13.19
Republican	David Scholl	85,145	12.36
Total votes		689,144	100

As the runner-up, Alexander requested a runoff.

Republican 2nd primary results
Party	Candidate	Votes	%
Republican	John Tedesco	75,366	54.42
Republican	Richard Alexander	63,119	45.58
Total votes		138,485	100

=== General election ===
==== Polling ====
Poll source	Date(s) administered	Sample size	Margin of error	June Atkinson (D)	John Tedesco (R)	Undecided
Public Policy Polling	October 23–25, 2012	880 LV	± 3.3%	42%	40%	18%
Public Policy Polling	September 27–30, 2012	981	± 3.1%	44%	34%	22%
Public Policy Polling	August 2–5, 2012	813	± 3.4%	44%	37%	19%

==== Results ====
General election results
Party	Candidate	Votes	%
Democratic	June Atkinson	2,336,441	54.24
Republican	John Tedesco	1,971,049	45.76
Total votes		4,307,490	100

== Commissioner of Agriculture ==
2012 North Carolina Commissioner of Agriculture election
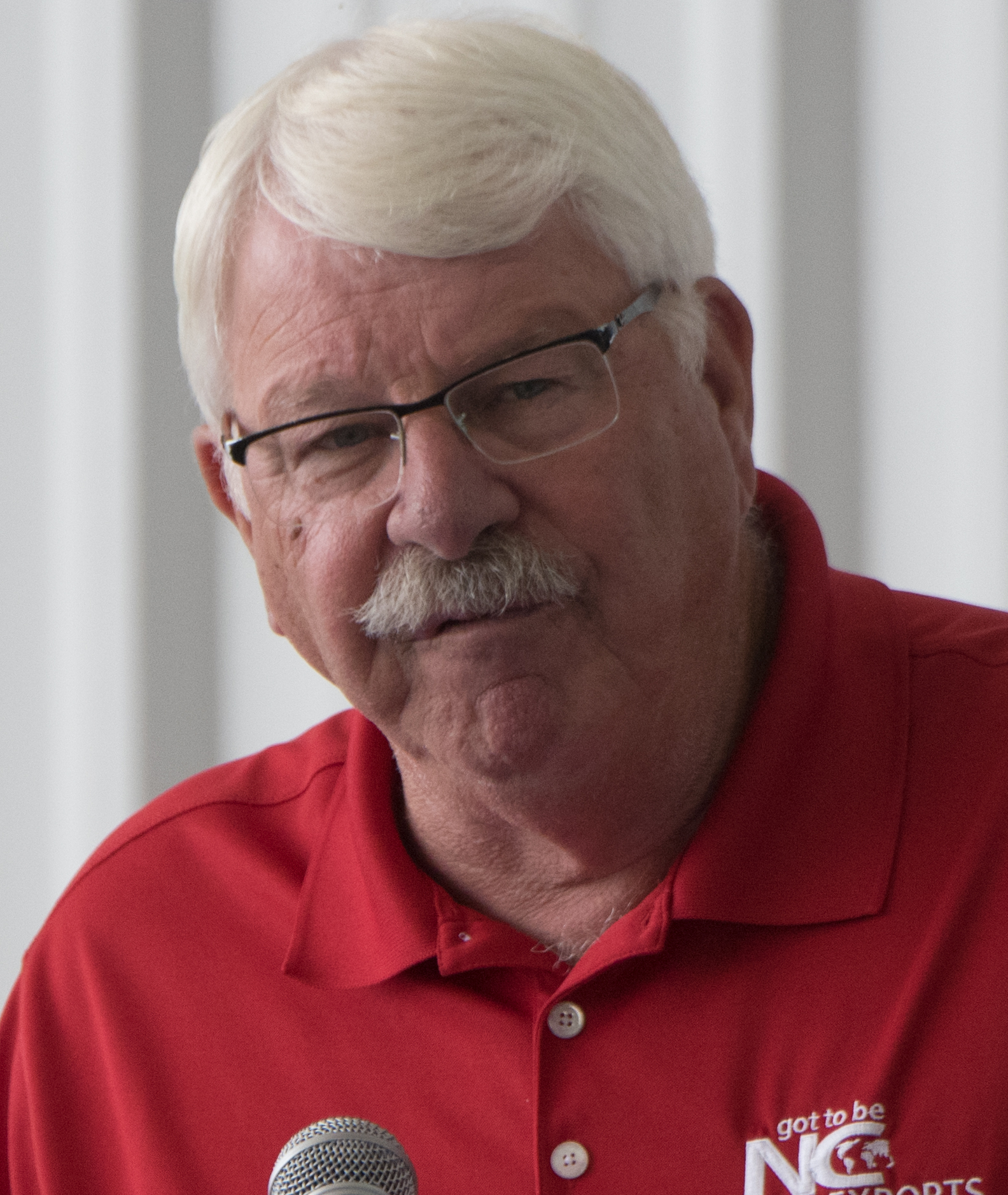

Nominee	Steve Troxler	Walter Smith
Party	Republican	Democratic
Popular vote	2,303,586	2,025,054
Percentage	53.2%	46.7%
- Troxler: 50-60% 60-70% 70-80%; Smith: 50-60% 60-70% 70-80%
Commissioner of Agriculture before election
Steve Troxler
Republican
Elected Commissioner of Agriculture
Steve Troxler
Republican

=== Republican primary ===
- Bill McManus, real estate investor, former attorney and accountant, former Democratic member of Massachusetts House of Representatives
- Steve Troxler, the Republican incumbent Commissioner, ran for re-election.

==== Polling ====
Poll source	Date(s) administered	Sample size	Margin of error	Bill McManus	Steve Troxler	Undecided
Public Policy Polling	April 27–29, 2012	486	± 4.4%	17%	48%	35%
Public Policy Polling	April 20–22, 2012	521	± 4.3%	17%	41%	42%

==== Primary results ====
Republican primary results
Party	Candidate	Votes	%
Republican	Steve Troxler	532,664	68.95
Republican	Bill McManus	239,920	31.05
Total votes		772,584	100

=== Democratic primary ===
- Scott Bryant, farmer and former law enforcement officer
- Walter Smith, farmer, former USDA official, former mayor of Boonville

==== Polling ====
Poll source	Date(s) administered	Sample size	Margin of error	Scott Bryant	Walter Smith	Undecided
Public Policy Polling	May 5–6, 2012	500	± 3.1%	21%	19%	60%
Public Policy Polling	April 27–29, 2012	505	± 4.36%	20%	17%	63%
Public Policy Polling	March 23–25, 2012	505	± 4.36%	17%	12%	71%
Public Policy Polling	February 29–March 1, 2012	499	± 4.4%	14%	13%	73%

==== Primary results ====
Democratic primary results
Party	Candidate	Votes	%
Democratic	Walter Smith	424,287	55.11
Democratic	Scott Bryant	345,644	44.89
Total votes		769,931	100

=== General election ===
==== Polling ====
Poll source	Date(s) administered	Sample size	Margin of error	Steve Troxler (R)	Walter Smith (D)	Undecided
Public Policy Polling	October 29–31, 2012	730	± 3.6%	48%	38%	14%
Public Policy Polling	August 31–September 1, 2012	1,012	± 3.1%	45%	35%	20%
Public Policy Polling	July 5–8, 2012	775	± 3.5%	46%	34%	20%
Public Policy Polling	June 7–10, 2012	810	± 3.4%	45%	31%	25%

==== Results ====
General election results
Party	Candidate	Votes	%
Republican	Steve Troxler	2,303,586	53.22
Democratic	Walter Smith	2,025,054	46.78
Total votes		4,328,640	100

== Commissioner of Labor ==
2012 North Carolina Commissioner of Labor election
- November 6, 2012
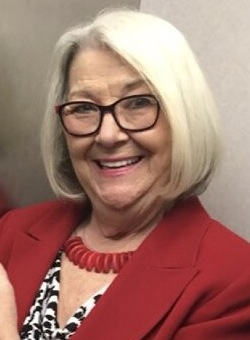

Nominee	Cherie Berry	John Brooks
Party	Republican	Democratic
Popular vote	2,300,500	2,019,266
Percentage	53.26%	46.74%
- Berry: 50–60% 60–70% 70–80%; Brooks: 50–60% 60–70% 70–80%
Commissioner of Labor before election
Cherie Berry
Republican
Elected Commissioner of Labor
Cherie Berry
Republican

=== Republican primary ===
- Cherie Berry, the Republican incumbent Commissioner, ran for re-election.

=== Democratic primary ===
- John C. Brooks, former Commissioner of Labor
- Marlowe Foster, public affairs director for Pfizer (registered lobbyist), former Winston-Salem State University official
- Ty Richardson, 2008 candidate

==== Polling ====
Poll source	Date(s) administered	Sample size	Margin of error	John Brooks	Marlowe Foster	Ty Richardson	Undecided
Public Policy Polling	May 5–6, 2012	500	± 3.1%	18%	14%	30%	38%
Public Policy Polling	April 27–29, 2012	500	± 4.4%	20%	12%	26%	42%
Public Policy Polling	April 20–22, 2012	500	± 4.4%	18%	10%	18%	54%
Public Policy Polling	March 23–25, 2012	505	± 4.36%	18%	8%	22%	51%
Public Policy Polling	February 29–March 1, 2012	499	± 4.4%	13%	9%	26%	52%

==== Primary results ====
Democratic primary results
Party	Candidate	Votes	%
Democratic	John C. Brooks	289,356	37.14
Democratic	Marlowe Foster	256,964	32.98
Democratic	Ty Richardson	232,730	29.87
Total votes		779,050	100

As the runner-up, Foster requested a runoff.

Democratic 2nd primary results
Party	Candidate	Votes	%
Democratic	John C. Brooks	31,216	54.15
Democratic	Marlowe Foster	26,431	45.85
Total votes		57,647	100

=== General election ===
==== Polling ====
Poll source	Date(s) administered	Sample size	Margin of error	Cherie Berry (R)	John Brooks (D)	Undecided
Public Policy Polling	October 23–25, 2012	880 LV	± 3.3%	43%	37%	19%
Public Policy Polling	September 27–30, 2012	981	± 3.1%	41%	37%	22%
Public Policy Polling	August 2–5, 2012	813	± 3.4%	44%	34%	22%

==== Results ====
General election results
Party	Candidate	Votes	%
Republican	Cherie Berry	2,300,500	53.26
Democratic	John Brooks	2,019,266	46.74
Total votes		4,319,766	100

== Commissioner of Insurance ==
2012 North Carolina Commissioner of Insurance election
- November 6, 2012
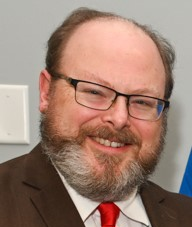

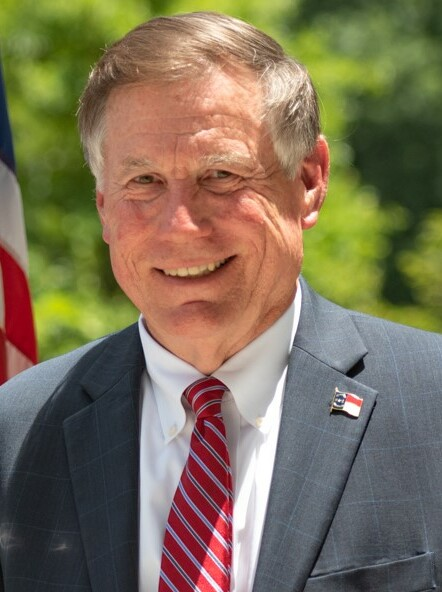
Nominee	Wayne Goodwin	Mike Causey
Party	Democratic	Republican
Popular vote	2,226,344	2,066,601
Percentage	51.86%	48.14%
- Goodwin: 50–60% 60–70% 70–80%; Causey: 50–60% 60–70% 70–80%
Commissioner of Insurance before election
Wayne Goodwin
Democratic
Elected Commissioner of Insurance
Wayne Goodwin
Democratic

=== Democratic primary ===
- Wayne Goodwin, the Democratic incumbent Commissioner, ran for re-election.

=== Republican primary ===
- Mike Causey, former lobbyist
- James McCall, insurance agent
- Richard T. Morgan, former state representative

==== Polling ====
Poll source	Date(s) administered	Sample size	Margin of error	Mike Causey	James McCall	Richard Morgan	Undecided
Public Policy Polling	May 5–6, 2012	496	± 4.4%	20%	14%	19%	47%
Public Policy Polling	April 27–29, 2012	486	± 4.4%	12%	12%	25%	51%
Public Policy Polling	April 20–22, 2012	521	± 4.3%	13%	10%	17%	60%

==== Primary results ====
Republican primary results
Party	Candidate	Votes	%
Republican	Richard Morgan	258,935	37.01
Republican	Mike Causey	245,430	35.08
Republican	James McCall	195,348	27.92
Total votes		699,713	100

As the runner-up, Causey requested a runoff. Of all the statewide runoffs held on July 17, the Republican primary for Insurance Commissioner was the only one in which the top vote-getter changed from the first to the second primary.

Republican 2nd primary results
Party	Candidate	Votes	%
Republican	Mike Causey	80,704	57.39
Republican	Richard Morgan	59,910	42.61
Total votes		140,614	100

=== General election ===
==== Polling ====
Poll source	Date(s) administered	Sample size	Margin of error	Wayne Goodwin (D)	Mike Causey (R)	Undecided
Public Policy Polling	October 23–25, 2012	880 LV	± 3.3%	45%	36%	19%
Public Policy Polling	September 27–30, 2012	981	± 3.1%	41%	36%	23%
Public Policy Polling	August 2–5, 2012	813	± 3.4%	40%	36%	24%

General election results
Party	Candidate	Votes	%
Democratic	Wayne Goodwin	2,226,344	51.86
Republican	Mike Causey	2,066,601	48.14
Total votes		4,292,945	100

== See also ==
- North Carolina Council of State elections: 1996, 2000, 2004, 2008.
