= Greg Lindberg =

American businessman and convict

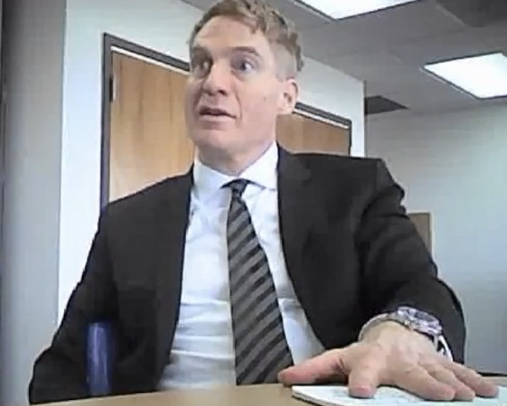
- Lindberg in 2018
- Born: Greg Evan Lindberg; July 1970 (age 55–56); San Mateo, California, U.S.
- Education: Yale University (BA)
- Spouse: Trisha Lindberg (separated)
- Children: 3
- Website: Official website

Greg Evan Lindberg (born July 1970) is a convicted American insurance fraudster, former business executive, and founder of Global Growth, a conglomerate private-equity firm. He also donated large sums of money to political causes.

In 2020 he was convicted of bribery and conspiracy to commit wire fraud, and sentenced to seven years and three months in federal prison. The conviction was overturned by a federal appeals court in June 2022 pending a retrial. He was convicted of the same charges at a new trial on May 15, 2024.

== Early life and education ==
Lindberg was born in San Mateo, California, United States, in July 1970, the youngest of five children. His father was an airline pilot. He attended Crystal Springs Uplands School in Hillsborough, California, before studying at Yale University, where he graduated with an economics degree in 1993.

== Career ==
=== Global Growth ===
In 1991, while still attending Yale University, Lindberg launched Home Care Week, a health insurance compliance and reimbursement newsletter for home health agencies. He later transformed this venture into a conglomerate, Eli Global, based in Durham, North Carolina. The conglomerate operated as a private-equity firm which bought and sold financially-troubled companies.

In 2012 Lindberg began investigating the possibility of acquiring insurance companies, displaying a particular interest in the large number of assets retained by such companies to fulfill payouts. In 2014 Eli Global made its first insurance acquisition when it purchased a burial-policy insurer based in Alabama. Lindberg wished to loan the insurer's assets to other businesses he owned, but the number of the company's assets he could invest in affiliated enterprises was restricted by Alabama state laws. Lindberg then relocated the insurer to North Carolina, where regulations on such practices were vaguer, and began trading the burial-policy insurer's investments in treasury bonds for large loans in his own companies. Though North Carolina regulators usually enforced a cap of affiliated investments on insurers at 10% of their assets, the North Carolina Department of Insurance led by North Carolina Commissioner of Insurance Wayne Goodwin reached a special agreement with Lindberg, allowing his burial-policy insurer to invest as much as 40% of its assets in affiliates, though this limit was also eventually breached. In 2015 and 2016 Lindberg acquired more insurers and grouped them together as the Global Bankers Insurance Group. As a result of the insurer acquisitions, Eli Global became markedly more profitable. Lindberg ultimately loaned about $2 billion from the insurance companies he had acquired to his affiliated corporations, using much of it to expand his private holdings. By 2019 he had acquired over 100 companies. On June 27, 2019, the North Carolina Department of Insurance placed several of Lindberg's insurance companies into "rehabilitation", citing concerns about their liquidity and ability to meet their obligations to policy holders. In late July North Carolina Governor Roy Cooper signed a legislative proposal—created in reaction to Lindberg's investment strategy and widely dubbed "the Lindberg bill"—into law setting a statutory limit on affiliated investments by insurers at 10% of their assets. Eli Global was re-branded as Global Growth in September and Lindberg resigned as its chief executive officer.

Following the public disclosure of Lindberg's personal legal troubles and those of his companies, he and some of his companies were sued by several corporations for failure to uphold business agreements. In 2021 he was sued by executives at four of his insurance companies, who accused him of loaning the companies' money to himself and failing to repay them. One Global Bankers subsidiary filed for bankruptcy. In May 2022 a federal judge ordered Lindberg to repay $524 million to a Puerto Rican insurance company whose assets were invested with another insurer which had failed. Later that month, in the civil case Southland v. Lindberg, a judge ordered Lindberg to cede control of hundreds of his corporate holdings to a special overseer board to repay four insurers which his holdings owed money as per the terms of a 2019 memorandum of understanding.

=== Political donations ===
Lindberg is registered as an independent voter. In February 2016 Lindberg made his first financial contribution to a political cause in North Carolina, donating to North Carolina Commissioner of Insurance Wayne Goodwin's reelection campaign. That month he also hosted a fundraiser for Goodwin. Lindberg then began funding N.C. Opportunity Committee, a political action committee which produced pro-Goodwin advertisements. A spokesman for Lindberg asserted that Lindberg appreciated that Goodwin was a "business-minded insurance commissioner" and that his donations were unrelated to the insurance department's handling of Lindberg's businesses during Goodwin's tenure. Goodwin lost reelection in 2016 and thereafter briefly worked as a consultant for Lindberg. In 2017 Lindberg and his business associates and their family members donated $40,000 to State Senator Wesley Meredith's campaign fund weeks after Meredith proposed a bill which would have eased the ability of insurers to make affiliated investments. The bill was never acted upon, and Meredith lost reelection in 2018. Between 2016 and 2018 he donated over $7.5 million to independent expenditure political action committees, state political committees, and federal political committees. Most of his contributions were given to members of the Republican Party, though he also gave a significant amount of money to members of the Democratic Party. In May 2018 N.C. Opportunity Committee dissolved and about a month later Lindberg created N.C. Growth and Prosperity, a new North Carolina–based political action committee.

In November 2017 Lindberg began donating money to political candidates' campaign funds in Florida, the same month one of his companies was declared "financially impaired" and thus restricted from doing business by state regulators. He became one of the largest individual donors to Florida Republicans during the 2018 elections, which included a transfer of $350,000 to political action committees supporting Rick Scott's candidacy for the U.S. Senate and other contributions to local legislative leaders and Chief Financial Officer of Florida Jimmy Patronis, whose office oversaw the Florida Office of Insurance Regulation. He also donated at least $25,000 to Louisiana Commissioner of Insurance Jim Donelon's reelection campaign either personally or through his companies.

=== Criminal convictions ===
In late 2017, Lindberg became frustrated with the lending limits placed on the assets of his insurance firm, Global Bankers Insurance Group, by North Carolina Deputy Commissioner of Insurance Jackie Obusek. After several heated exchanges with Obusek, Lindberg and two business associates, John Gray and John Palermo Jr., began meeting with North Carolina Commissioner of Insurance Mike Causey, a Republican, to discuss Obusek's position in regulating the insurance firm. Lindberg suggested that Palermo be hired by Causey to regulate his companies. By January 2018 Causey had informed law enforcement officials of the meetings and he began assisting the Federal Bureau of Investigation as the agency investigated Lindberg's entreaties. Over the course of the discussions, Lindberg ultimately donated about $250,000 to the North Carolina Republican Party.

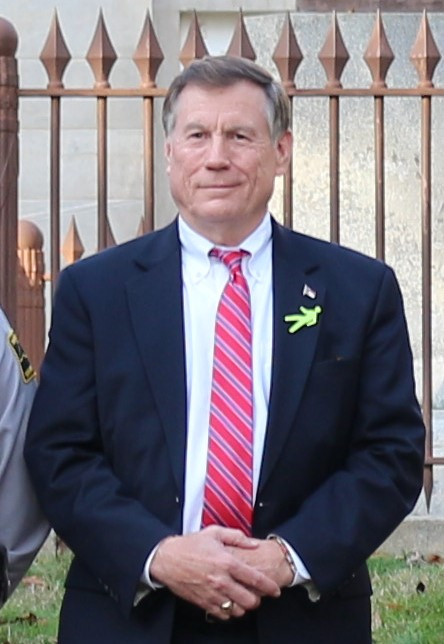
Lindberg accused North Carolina Commissioner of Insurance Mike Causey (pictured) of entrapment during a federal investigation into Lindberg's political contributions

On March 18, 2019, Lindberg, Gray, and Palermo, along with the chair of the North Carolina Republican Party, Robin Hayes, were indicted by a federal grand jury for financial crimes including wire fraud and bribery. According to the indictment, Lindberg and his associates—coordinating with Hayes—promised to donate millions of dollars to the North Carolina Republican Party in exchange for favorable treatment of Global Bankers Insurance Group by Causey and the dismissal of the deputy insurance commissioner responsible for regulating Lindberg's businesses. In April the U.S. Department of Justice seized over $1.4 million from N.C. Growth and Prosperity bank accounts. Lindberg maintained his innocence; in a motion he filed seeking dismissal of the charges, Lindberg asserted that the contributions he made and requests to Causey did not constitute bribery. The motion was rejected by a federal judge.

Lindberg's trial began on February 18, 2020, in Charlotte, North Carolina, presided over by United States District Judge Max O. Cogburn Jr. During the proceedings the prosecutors played recordings of conversations made between Lindberg and Causey. During the conversations Lindberg and his associates repeatedly urged Causey to reassign the deputy insurance commissioner who they felt was damaging his companies' reputation. They promised that in return they would give Causey millions of dollars to fund his reelection campaign, funneling the money through an independent expenditure committee and later the North Carolina Republican Party. Lindberg's attorneys accused Causey of trying to entrap Lindberg, possibly as retaliation for the businessman's backing of Goodwin as Commissioner of Insurance in the previous election.

On March 5, 2020, Lindberg was found guilty of conspiracy to commit honest services wire fraud and bribery by the jury. After he was convicted, Lindberg filed a motion seeking a judgment of acquittal or a new trial; the motion was denied. He also filed a lawsuit against Causey, accusing him of abusing power and entrapment. U.S. District Court Judge Catherine Eagles later dismissed the suit with prejudice. In June 2020, Lindberg, citing in-part his own legal difficulties, donated money to the American Civil Liberties Union, saying that he was "disturbed by the consequences of prosecutorial abuses and unjust incarceration of non-violent offenders for some time." On August 19, Lindberg was sentenced to seven years and three months in prison, to be followed by three years of probation, and was also ordered to pay a fine of $35,000. He reported to Federal Prison Camp, Montgomery on October 20, 2020, to begin his sentence.

On September 2, 2020, Lindberg's attorney filed for an appeal in the U.S. Court of Appeals for the Fourth Circuit. On June 29, 2022, the court overturned his conviction, ruling that the jury instructions supplied by the judge in the original proceedings poorly described what constituted an "official act" and stating that a new trial should be held. He was released from prison on July 15 and moved to Tampa, Florida. A retrial was scheduled to begin in November 2023 but was delayed until May 2024. He was convicted of the same charges on May 15, 2024.

In August 2022, the U.S. Securities and Exchange Commission filed a civil complaint against Lindberg, a business associate, and their investment advisory company, accusing them of taking over $75 million from their clients through undisclosed transactions. In February 2023, Lindberg was indicted by a federal grand jury on 13 counts related to an alleged conspiracy to steal millions of dollars from his own companies. On November 12, 2024, he pled guilty to one count of conspiracy to commit offenses against the United States including wire fraud, investment adviser fraud, and crimes in connection with an insurance business, and one count of conspiracy to launder money. On May 26, 2026, he was sentenced to 12 years in prison.

=== Self-help and health projects ===
Following his initial incarceration and release, Lindberg released a memoir, 633 Days Inside, in which he wrote about personal resilience. Thereafter he began promoting self-help and dieting techniques.

== Personal life ==
In 2013 Lindberg claimed to maintain a net worth of $340 million. Following his increased activity in the insurance industry in 2014, Lindberg began spending significantly more money on his private life than he had previously done. He purchased homes in Idaho and the Florida Keys, as well as making the largest-ever purchase for a private home in Raleigh, North Carolina. He also acquired a yacht and a private jet. In late 2017 a spokesperson stated that his net worth was $1.7 billion. Following his indictment, the home he purchased in Raleigh was put up for sale. In July 2020 he released a letter written by the Berkeley Research Group which declared his personal net worth to be "between $860 million and $1.46 billion".

Lindberg married Tisha and had three children with her. They later became estranged, separating in 2017. As of 2019, the two were seeking divorce. Following the couple's separation, Lindberg began dating other women. He hired dozens of private investigators to observe and track the women; some women were followed at all times. Lindberg maintained that this was only done to ensure that the women were not living unhealthy or destructive lifestyles—such as taking narcotics—and told the operatives he hired that the women had consented to surveillance. Reports from the private investigators obtained by The Wall Street Journal indicated that Lindberg was particularly interested in the interactions the women had with other men. Some of the operatives were also doubtful that the women had consented to surveillance.
