= 1978 United States Senate election in North Carolina =

- November 7, 1978
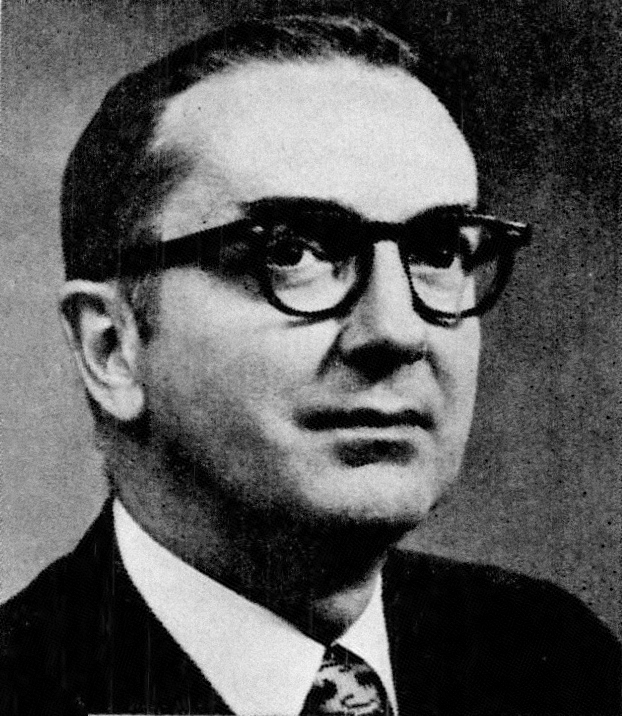

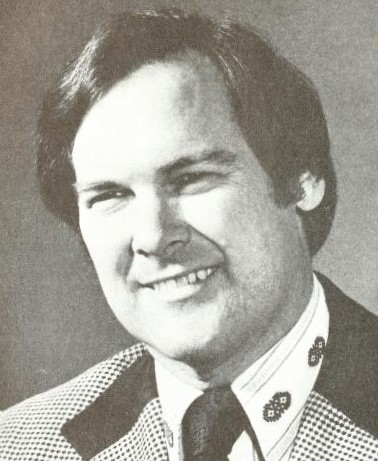
| Nominee | Jesse Helms | John Ingram |
| Party | Republican | Democratic |
| Popular vote | 619,151 | 516,663 |
| Percentage | 54.51% | 45.49% |
- County results Helms: 50– 60% 60–70% 70–80% Ingram: 50–60% 60–70%
U.S. senator before election
Jesse Helms
Republican
Elected U.S. Senator
Jesse Helms
Republican

The North Carolina United States Senate election of 1978 was held on November 7, 1978 as part of the nationwide elections to the Senate. The general election was between the Republican incumbent Jesse Helms and the Democratic nominee John Ingram. Helms won re-election, by a slightly wider margin than in 1972. This was the first Senate election where Republicans were re-elected to this seat.

== Republican primary ==
=== Candidates ===
- Jesse Helms, incumbent Senator since 1973

=== Results ===
Jesse Helms won the Republican Party's nomination unopposed.

== Democratic primary ==
=== Candidates ===
- Lawrence Davis
- William Griffin
- Joe Felmet, Winston-Salem Journal editorialist, civil rights activist, and candidate for U.S. House in 1974
- Luther H. Hodges Jr., chairman of North Carolina National Bank and son of former U.S. Secretary of Commerce Luther Hodges
- John Ingram, North Carolina Commissioner of Insurance since 1973
- Dave McKnight
- Tom Sawyer
- McNeill Smith, State Senator from Greensboro

=== Results ===
1978 North Carolina U.S. Senate Democratic primary election – First round
| Party | Candidate | Votes | % |
|---|---|---|---|
| Democratic | Luther H. Hodges Jr. | 260,868 | 40.08% |
| Democratic | John Ingram | 170,715 | 26.23% |
| Democratic | Lawrence Davis | 105,381 | 16.19% |
| Democratic | McNeill Smith | 82,703 | 12.71% |
| Democratic | Dave McKnight | 9,422 | 1.45% |
| Democratic | William Griffin | 8,907 | 1.37% |
| Democratic | Tom Sawyer | 8,482 | 1.30% |
| Democratic | Joe Felmet | 4,464 | 0.69% |
| Turnout | | 650,942 | |

1978 North Carolina U.S. Senate Democratic primary election – Second round
| Party | Candidate | Votes | % | ±% |
|---|---|---|---|---|
| Democratic | John Ingram | 244,469 | 54.24% | +28.01% |
| Democratic | Luther H. Hodges, Jr. | 206,223 | 45.76% | +5.68% |
| Turnout | | 450,692 | | |

== General election ==
=== Candidates ===
- Jesse Helms, U.S. Senator since 1973 (Republican)
- John Ingram (Democratic)

=== Results ===
1978 North Carolina U.S. Senate election
| Party | Candidate | Votes | % | ±% |
|---|---|---|---|---|
| Republican | Jesse Helms (incumbent) | 619,151 | 54.51% | +0.50% |
| Democratic | John Ingram | 516,663 | 45.49% | −0.50% |
| Turnout | | 1,135,814 | | |
| Republican hold | | Swing | | |

== See also ==
- 1978 United States Senate elections
