= Joe Felmet =

American civil rights activist

- 1978 photo
- Born: Joseph Andrew Felmet; May 31, 1921; Asheville, North Carolina, U.S.
- Died: 1994 (aged 72–73); Winston-Salem, North Carolina
- Education: University of North Carolina at Chapel Hill
- Occupation: Journalist

Joseph Andrew Felmet (May 31, 1921 – 1994) was an American journalist, pacifist, and civil rights activist. He worked as a reporter for The Hartford Times and the Winston-Salem Journal. He participated in the Journey of Reconciliation in 1947, considered the precursor to the Freedom Riders.

== Early life ==
Felmet was born on May 31, 1921, in Asheville, North Carolina. He attended Lee H. Edwards High School and delivered newspapers for The Asheville Times. He graduated from the University of North Carolina at Chapel Hill in 1942 with a bachelor's degree in journalism.

== Civil rights, journalism, and politics ==
After graduating from college, Felmet worked as a reporter for the Asheville Advocate. In 1942, he was sent to a conscientious objector camp for failing to register with the Selective Service. He was released after agreeing to register with the Selective Service after spending six months in the camp, but in 1943, he was drafted to the United States Army and refused to report. Felmet was sentenced to one year and one day in prison, but was released after six months. After the war, he joined the United World Federalists. He registered with the Socialist Party of America. In 1946, he became secretary of the Workers' Defense League (WDL). He was sentenced to 15 days in jail in Fort Lauderdale, Florida, in February 1947 for not registering with the city prior to canvassing in African-American neighborhoods for the WDL.

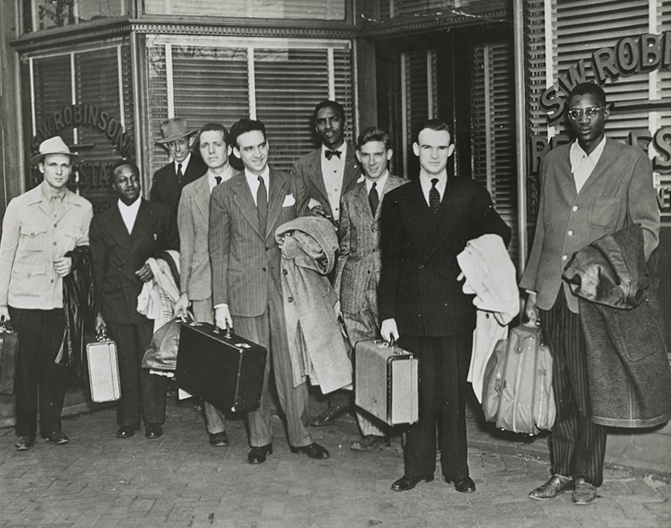
Participants of the Journey of Reconciliation in 1947

In April 1947, Felmet participated in the Journey of Reconciliation, the precursor to the Freedom Riders, challenging racial segregation. Felmet, Bayard Rustin, Igal Roodenko, and Andrew Johnson were arrested in North Carolina for violating local Jim Crow laws regarding segregated seating on public transportation. They were sentenced to serve on a chain gang for 30 days. On June 17, 2022, Judge Allen Baddour, with full consent of the State and Defense, dismissed the charges against the four Freedom Riders, with members of the exonerees’ families in attendance.

Felmet worked as a reporter for The Hartford Times in the 1950s. He returned to North Carolina in 1955 when he accepted a job with the Winston-Salem Journal, where he worked in the editorial staff. Felmet retired from journalism in 1969.

In the 1974 elections, Felmet ran for the Democratic Party nomination for North Carolina's 5th congressional district in the United States House of Representatives, challenging incumbent Republican Wilmer Mizell on an anti-war platform. He lost the primary election to Stephen L. Neal, receiving 5,141 votes to Neal's 28,379, and Neal went on to defeat Mizell. Felmet ran for the Democratic Party nomination for the United States Senate in the 1978 election. Luther H. Hodges Jr., who received 38% of the vote, and John Ingram, getting 26% of the vote, advanced to a runoff election.

Felmet delivered a petition to President Jimmy Carter and Governor Jim Hunt seeking a pardon on behalf of the Wilmington Ten. As a member of the War Resisters League, Felmet petitioned President Ronald Reagan to end the draft, which President Carter had reinstated during his administration. He was arrested on the campus of North Carolina State University for trespassing when he refused to stop circulating petitions. Felmet filed a brief with the court challenging the university's restrictions on outsiders communicating with students as a violation of his First Amendment rights. The university dropped the charges and agreed to review their policy. Felmet enrolled at Wake Forest University to study the Russian language, and petitioned the United States Information Agency for issues of Amerika, the Russian-language magazine published by the United States Department of State. They declined his request based on the Smith–Mundt Act, a 1948 anti-propaganda law that prohibits domestic distribution of its materials meant for foreign distribution.

Felmet also brought a test case for First Amendment right to petition Congress in the parking lot of a large Winston-Salem shopping center, refusing to stop petitioning and arguing the site was a “public forum” for free speech. The North Carolina Supreme Court in State v. Felmet, 273 S.E.2d 708 (1981), declined to follow other states to extend free-speech protection under the State Constitution, and upheld his trespass conviction.

Shortly thereafter, Felmet entered the Town Common at Old Salem in Winston-Salem and petitioned Congress to end the draft. When he refused to leave, he was charged with trespass. The charge was dismissed and Old Salem Foundation agreed to recognize freedom of speech in the Town Common when Felmet produced substantial records of State funding of road and other improvements at Old Salem.

== Personal life ==
In 1952, it was reported that Felmet was engaged to Marianne Ryon of Stonington, Connecticut. It is not clear that the marriage took place.

It is known that on July 27, 1965, Felmet married widow Marjorie "Margie" Halpern (née Marjorie Spainhour Keiger). Her father, Joseph Lee Keiger, Sr. (1899-1956), founded Old Town Telephone System. Through a series of mergers, the company became part of what would be known as the telecommunications company Alltel, which along the way would provide substantial financial assets to Margie. Despite the monetary comfort her money brought to the couple, they lived in a modest house in Winston-Salem.

Margie was a talented piano player and teacher. She was a graduate of Hollins College and UNC Chapel Hill, with an MA from Eastman School of Music in Rochester, NY. She taught piano at Meredith College in the 1940s and later taught at Wake Forest University and gave private piano lessons in Winston-Salem.

Margie died on March 9, 1993, from a blood disorder.

After Margie's death, Felmet challenged his wife's will, drafted by her siblings. Her estate was substantial primarily due to investments rooted in her father's founding of Old Town Telephone System. When the telephone company was bought by AT&T, the parents and five siblings were all paid several million dollars each. Although the will provided interest-only support for Felmet for his remaining life, estimated to be valued at about one-tenth of the estate, the will left the bulk to her siblings and their heirs. Felmet challenged the will as invalid under state law since it provided less than he would receive by intestate succession without a will (1/2 the estate). The estate agreed to award Felmet just under one-third of the estate, with the siblings retaining the major share.

== Death ==
Felmet remained in the couple's modest home after his wife's death in 1993. He died in September 1994, but his exact date of death could not be determined. A family member who had been unable to reach Felmet went to his home on September 28 and called the police when no one answered the door. An officer discovered Felmet's body, allegedly in the bathtub.

Felmet's death certificate says he was pronounced dead on September 28, 1994, but the date of his death is listed as September 20, 1994, which is when he reportedly was last seen alive. The cause of death, ischemic heart disease, was later added to the death certificate after an autopsy was performed.

The October 20, 1994, edition of the Winston-Salem Chronicle simply mentioned that Felmet had died "recently". The Chronicle noted that prior to his death, Felmet had expressed he did not want a memorial service held for him after he died. Instead, it was his wish that mourners donate to the War Resisters League, the Fellowship of Reconciliation, or the Unitarian Church of Winston-Salem.

Felmet bequeathed his estate to the War Resister’s League, the Fellowship of Reconciliation, and his niece.
