= Electoral history of Jesse Helms =

List of elections featuring Jesse Helms as a candidate

The electoral history of Jesse Helms begins with his election to Raleigh City Council. However, most of the elections in which he was involved were to the United States Senate. Five consecutive victories gave Jesse Helms a thirty-year Senate career.

== United States Senate ==
=== 1972 election ===
1972 North Carolina U.S. Senate Republican primary election
| Party | Candidate | Votes | % | ±% |
|---|---|---|---|---|
| Republican | Jesse Helms | 92,496 | 60.13 | N/A |
| Republican | James Johnson | 45,303 | 29.45 | N/A |
| Republican | William Booe | 16,032 | 10.42 | N/A |
| Turnout | | 153,831 | | |

1972 North Carolina U.S. Senate election
| Party | Candidate | Votes | % | ±% |
|---|---|---|---|---|
| Republican | Jesse Helms | 795,247 | 54.01 | +9.61 |
| Democratic | Nick Galifianakis | 677,293 | 45.99 | −9.60 |
| Turnout | | 1,472,540 | | |

=== 1978 election ===
Helms won the Republican Party's nomination unopposed.

1978 North Carolina U.S. Senate election
| Party | Candidate | Votes | % | ±% |
|---|---|---|---|---|
| Republican | Jesse Helms (incumbent) | 619,151 | 54.51 | +0.50 |
| Democratic | John Ingram | 516,663 | 45.49 | −0.50 |
| Turnout | | 1,135,814 | | |

=== 1984 election ===
1984 North Carolina U.S. Senate Republican primary election
| Party | Candidate | Votes | % | ±% |
|---|---|---|---|---|
| Republican | Jesse Helms (incumbent) | 134,675 | 90.65 | N/A |
| Republican | George Wimbish | 13,799 | 9.35 | N/A |
| Turnout | | 148,574 | | |

1984 North Carolina U.S. Senate election
| Party | Candidate | Votes | % | ±% |
|---|---|---|---|---|
| Republican | Jesse Helms (incumbent) | 1,156,768 | 51.66 | −2.85 |
| Democratic | Jim Hunt | 1,070,488 | 47.81 | +2.32 |
| Libertarian | Bobby Emory | 9,302 | 0.42 | N/A |
| Socialist Workers | Kate Daher | 2,493 | 0.11 | N/A |
| Turnout | | 2,239,051 | | |

=== 1990 election ===
1990 North Carolina U.S. Senate Republican primary election
| Party | Candidate | Votes | % | ±% |
|---|---|---|---|---|
| Republican | Jesse Helms (incumbent) | 157,345 | 84.32 | −6.33 |
| Republican | L. C. Nixon | 15,355 | 8.23 | N/A |
| Republican | George Wimbish | 13,895 | 7.45 | −1.90 |
| Turnout | | 186,595 | | |

1990 North Carolina U.S. Senate election
| Party | Candidate | Votes | % | ±% |
|---|---|---|---|---|
| Republican | Jesse Helms (incumbent) | 1,089,012 | 52.58 | +0.92 |
| Democratic | Harvey Gantt | 981,573 | 47.39 | −0.42 |
| Socialist Workers | Rich Stuart | 681 | 0.03 | −0.08 |
| Turnout | | 2,071,266 | | |

=== 1996 election ===
Helms won the Republican Party's nomination unopposed.

1996 North Carolina U.S. Senate election
| Party | Candidate | Votes | % | ±% |
|---|---|---|---|---|
| Republican | Jesse Helms (incumbent) | 1,436,638 | 55.89 | +3.31 |
| Democratic | Harvey Gantt | 1,097,053 | 42.68 | −4.71 |
| Libertarian | Ray Ubinger | 25,396 | 0.99 | N/A |
| Natural Law | Victor Pardo | 11,209 | 0.44 | N/A |
| Turnout | | 2,570,439 | | |

== Vice President of the United States ==
Helms ran for the Republican Party's nomination for Vice President a number of times. However, he always withdrew his nomination before the party national convention. Nonetheless, two 'Draft Helms' movements have led to him winning a number of unsolicited delegates at the convention, placing him second (in a one-horse race) both times.

=== 1976 Republican National Convention ===
1976 Republican National Convention nomination for Vice President
| Party | Candidate | Votes | % | ±% |
|---|---|---|---|---|
| Republican | Bob Dole | 1,921 | 89.10 | |
| Republican | Jesse Helms | 103 | 4.78 | N/A |
| Republican | Ronald Reagan | 27 | 1.25 | |
| Republican | Others | 105 | 4.87 | N/A |
| Turnout | | 2,156 | | |

=== 1980 Republican National Convention ===
1980 Republican National Convention nomination for Vice President
| Party | Candidate | Votes | % | ±% |
|---|---|---|---|---|
| Republican | George H. W. Bush | 1,832 | 93.33 | +93.29 |
| Republican | Jesse Helms | 54 | 2.75 | −2.03 |
| Republican | Jack Kemp | 42 | 2.14 | N/A |
| Republican | Others | 35 | 1.78 | N/A |
| Turnout | | 1,963 | | |
