= George Long =

George Long may refer to:

- George Long (bishop) (1874–1930), Anglican bishop and brigadier general in the Australian Army
- George Long (footballer) (born 1993), English football goalkeeper
- George Long (scholar) (1800–1879), English classical scholar
- George R. Long, convicted murderer of Lucina C. Broadwell
- George S. Long (1883–1958), U.S. representative from Louisiana
- George Attmore Long (1911–1999), American lawyer and politician from North Carolina
