= Senator Lanier =

Senator Lanier may refer to:

- Edwin S. Lanier (1901–1983), North Carolina State Senate
- Steve D. Lanier (born 1966), New Mexico State Senate
