= Mike Causey =

American politician

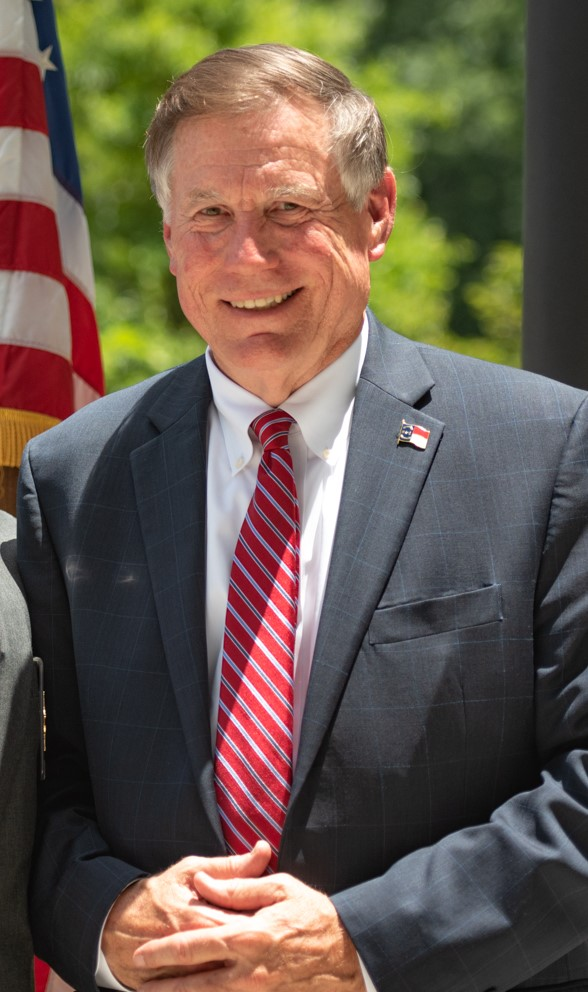
- Causey in 2022

11th Insurance Commissioner of North Carolina
- Incumbent
- Assumed office January 1, 2017
- Governor: Roy Cooper; Josh Stein
- Preceded by: Wayne Goodwin

Personal details
- Born: John Michael Causey; September 11, 1950 (age 75) Guilford County, North Carolina, U.S.
- Party: Republican
- Education: University of North Carolina, Charlotte (attended); High Point University (BA)

John Michael Causey (born September 11, 1950) is an American politician who has served as the North Carolina Commissioner of Insurance since 2017. He is a member of the Republican Party.

== Early life ==
Causey grew up in rural Guilford County on a produce farm. He sold produce at local farm markets and owned Greensboro Downtown Farm Market which closed after Causey went to work in Raleigh with the North Carolina Department of Transportation in 2013.

== Political career ==
Causey ran for the office of commissioner of insurance in 1992, 1996, 2000, and 2012 as the state Republican nominee, but lost each race. In 2014, he sought a seat in the U.S. House of Representatives, running for the 6th congressional district. He ultimately lost, placing seventh in the Republican primary. In 2016, Causey again sought the office of insurance commissioner and defeated incumbent Democrat Wayne Goodwin.

Causey assumed the office of insurance commissioner in January 2017. Starting that year, Causey began cooperating with the FBI in the investigation of political corruption charges related to Greg Lindberg. After his conviction, Lindberg filed a lawsuit alleging Causey made materially false representations to the State Ethics Board of North Carolina, to the FBI and under oath in federal court. U.S. District Court Judge Catherine Eagles later dismissed the suit with prejudice.

== Electoral history ==
1996 North Carolina Commissioner of Insurance election
Party	Candidate	Votes	%	±%
Democratic	James E. Long (incumbent)	1,388,894	56.74	
Republican	Mike Causey	1,010,782	40.93	
Libertarian	Sean Haugh	26,258	1.07	
Natural Law	Stephen Wolfe	21,939	0.90	
Turnout		2,447,873		

2000 North Carolina Commissioner of Insurance election
Party	Candidate	Votes	%	±%
Democratic	James E. Long (incumbent)	1,590,139	56.53	–0.20
Republican	Mike Causey	1,222,527	43.47	+2.17
Turnout		2,812,666		

2012 North Carolina Commissioner of Insurance election
Party	Candidate	Votes	%	±%
Democratic	Wayne Goodwin	2,226,344	51.86	
Republican	Mike Causey	2,066,601	48.14	
Total votes		4,292,945	100	

2014 Republican Primary Results for North Carolina's 6th congressional district
Party	Candidate	Votes	%
Republican	Phil Berger, Jr.	15,127	34.3
Republican	Mark Walker	11,123	25.2
Republican	Bruce VonCannon	5,055	11.4
Republican	Zack Matheny	5,043	11.4
Republican	Jeff Phillips	3,494	7.9
Republican	Don Webb	1,899	4.3
Republican	Mike Causey	1,427	3.2
Republican	Kenn Kopf	510	1.2
Republican	Charlie Sutherland	458	1.0
Total votes		44,136	100.0

North Carolina Commissioner of Insurance election, 2016
Party	Candidate	Votes	%	±%
Republican	Mike Causey	2,270,841	50.40%	+2.26%
Democratic	Wayne Goodwin (incumbent)	2,234,953	49.60%	−2.26%
Total votes		4,505,794	100.0%	N/A
Republican gain from Democratic				

North Carolina Commissioner of Insurance election, 2020
Party	Candidate	Votes	%	±%
Republican	Mike Causey (incumbent)	2,775,488	51.76%	+1.36%
Democratic	Wayne Goodwin	2,586,464	48.24%	−1.36%
Total votes		5,361,952	100.0%	
Republican hold				

North Carolina Commissioner of Insurance election, 2024
Party	Candidate	Votes	%	±%
Republican	Mike Causey (incumbent)	2,883,997	51.12%	−0.64%
Democratic	Natasha Marcus	2,649,353	47.88%	+0.64%
Total votes		5,533,349	100.0%	
Republican hold				

Party political offices
Preceded by Pete Rednour	Republican nominee for Insurance Commissioner of North Carolina; 1992, 1996, 2000	Succeeded by Robert Brawley
Preceded by John Odom	Republican nominee for Insurance Commissioner of North Carolina; 2012, 2016, 2020, 2024	Most recent
Political offices
Preceded by Wayne Goodwin	Insurance Commissioner of North Carolina; 2017–present	Incumbent
