= Roy Rowe =

American theater manager and politician

Roy H. Rowe was an American politician.

Rowe was a theatre manager for Warner Bros., based in Pittsburgh and Washington, D.C. Upon returning to his hometown of Burgaw, North Carolina, by the 1940s, Rowe became the manager of the Pender Theater. Rowe served in the North Carolina House of Representatives and the North Carolina Senate. Rowe sought the Democratic Party nomination for the 1952 North Carolina lieutenant gubernatorial election, which was won by Luther H. Hodges. Roy Rowe was married to Nina Worsley Rowe.
