= Bean Station (disambiguation) =

Bean Station is a town in the U.S. state of Tennessee.

Bean Station may refer to:

Places in the United States:

- Bean Lake Station, an unincorporated community in Platte County, Missouri
- Beans, Tennessee, an unincorporated community in Grainger County near Bean Station

In the military:

- Battle of Bean's Station, battle of the Knoxville Campaign of the American Civil War, occurring on December 14, 1863

In history:

- 2018 Southeastern Provisions raid, workplace raid in unincorporated Grainger County near Bean Station
- 1972 Bean Station, Tennessee bus crash, multi-vehicle collision that killed 14 and is considered one of the worst accidents in Tennessee history
