= Federal Prison Camp, Montgomery =

Federal prison in Alabama, United States

Coordinates: 32.3930°N 86.3585°W

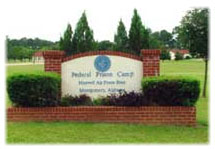
- Interactive map of Federal Prison Camp, Montgomery
- Location: Montgomery, Alabama
- Status: Operational
- Security class: Minimum-security
- Population: 662 (April 2024)
- Managed by: Federal Bureau of Prisons

The Federal Prison Camp, Montgomery (FPC Montgomery) is a minimum-security United States federal prison for male inmates in Montgomery, Alabama. It is operated by the Federal Bureau of Prisons, a division of the United States Department of Justice.

FPC Montgomery is located on the grounds of Maxwell Air Force Base, in northwest Montgomery, Alabama. The majority of inmates at the camp serve time for white-collar, drug-related, or immigration crimes and do not have a history of violence, and most are on sentences under 10 years and have a personal history making them fit for camp placement.

== Notable inmates ==
Inmate name	Register number	Photo	Status	Details
Jesse Jackson Jr.	32451-016		Released on March 26, 2015 after serving 29 months.	Son of civil rights activist Jesse Jackson and Illinois Congressman from 1995 to 2012; pleaded guilty in 2012 to conspiracy to commit wire fraud, mail fraud, and making false statements for using over $750,000 in campaign funds for personal expenses.
Jim Beck	72441-019		Scheduled for release in 2026.	Georgia Insurance Commissioner who was convicted of multiple counts of fraud (wire, mail, tax) as well as money laundering.
Sherman A. Bernard	23073-034		Released on September 20, 1996 after serving 41 months.	Louisiana insurance commissioner from 1972 to 1988, confessed to extortion of campaign contributions from insurance companies doing business with the state
Michael A. Brown	25098-016		Serving a 39-month sentence started in 2014, released 2016.	In 2014, when serving as a Councilmember for the District of Columbia, Brown was convicted of accepting bribes from FBI agents posing as businessmen.
Robert Frederick Collins	22178-034		Sentenced to five years, Collins was released on November 21, 1997. He served part of his sentence in Montgomery.	Former US Federal Judge. In 1991, Collins was convicted of accepting money to influence his sentencing of a marijuana smuggler.
John Paul Jr.	04923-018		Released on October 12, 1988 after serving 28 months	IndyCar driver, convicted on May 8, 1986 for federal racketeering
Charles Colson	Unlisted†		Released from custody in 1975 after serving 7 months.	Special Counsel to President Richard Nixon from 1969 to 1973; pleaded guilty to obstruction of justice in 1974 in connection with the Watergate Scandal.
James Brantley	53551-074		Served an 18-month sentence, released January 7, 2021	Found guilty of multiple state and federal crimes, including tax evasion up to $2.4 million, wire fraud, employing immigrants not authorized to work in the US, and many other workplace violations.
Reche Caldwell	61345-018		Sentenced to 27 months.	Former college and professional football player who was a wide receiver in the National Football League for six seasons in the early 2000s. Sentenced in 2015 for possession of the drug "MDMA" with intent to distribute. In addition, he pleaded guilty to drug charges involving marijuana and ecstasy, along with charges involving gambling.
Greg Lindberg	34828-058		Sentenced to 87 months, reported on October 20, 2020., released July 15, 2022 after conviction was overturned	Insurance executive and self-described billionaire, convicted of bribing a state insurance commissioner and of conspiracy to defraud.
Jeffrey Skilling	29296-179		Sentenced October 23, 2006 to 24 years and four months in prison. Sentence reduced in 2013. Released on February 21, 2019	Former CEO of the Enron Corporation. Guilty on one count of conspiracy, guilty on one count of insider trading, guilty on five counts of making false statements to auditors, guilty on twelve counts of securities fraud.
Richard Alvin Tonry	Unlisted†		Released after six months confinement in the late 1970s	U.S. representative from Louisiana's 1st congressional district in 1977; he pleaded guilty to campaign finance violations pursued against him by U.S. Attorney Gerald J. Gallinghouse.
Kevin Trudeau	18046-036		Serving a 10-year sentence after being convicted of Contempt of court in 2014. Released on January 18, 2022.	Known for his ubiquitous infomercials promoting unsubstantiated health, diet, and financial remedies.
John N. Mitchell	Unlisted†		Released after 19 months confinement in 1979.	United States Attorney General to President Richard Nixon from 1969 to 1972; pleaded guilty to obstruction of justice and lying to a grand jury in 1974 in connection with the Watergate Scandal.
Charles Kushner	26526-050		Released on August 25, 2006 after 14 months to a halfway house in Newark, New Jersey. Pardoned by President Donald Trump on December 23, 2020.	American real estate developer; pleaded guilty to 18 counts of illegal campaign contributions, tax evasion and witness tampering. His son, Jared, is President Donald Trump's son-in-law. In 2025, Kushner was appointed US Ambassador to France.

†Inmates who were released from custody prior to 1982 are not listed on the Bureau of Prisons website.

== See also ==
- List of U.S. federal prisons
- Federal Bureau of Prisons
- Incarceration in the United States
