= Martha Blakeney Hodges =

First Lady of North Carolina (1954–1961)

First Lady of North Carolina
- Assumed role November 7, 1954 – January 5, 1961
- Governor: Luther H. Hodges
- Preceded by: Merle Davis Umstead
- Succeeded by: Margaret Rose Sanford

Second Lady of North Carolina
- Assumed role January 8, 1953 – November 7, 1954
- Governor: William B. Umstead
- Lieutenant Governor: Luther H. Hodges
- Preceded by: Inez Wooten Taylor
- Succeeded by: Burvelle MacFarland Barnhardt

Personal details
- Born: Martha Elizabeth Blakeney; September 12, 1897 Monroe, North Carolina, U.S.
- Died: June 27, 1969 (aged 71) Chapel Hill, North Carolina, U.S.
- Resting place: Overlook Cemetery
- Party: Democratic
- Spouse: Luther H. Hodges
- Children: 3 (including Luther H. Hodges Jr.)
- Education: Woman's College of the University of North Carolina
- Occupation: teacher, principal

Martha Elizabeth Blakeney Hodges (September 12, 1897 – June 27, 1969) was an American educator and political hostess. As the wife of Governor Luther H. Hodges, she served as the Second Lady of North Carolina from 1953 to 1954 and as First Lady of North Carolina from 1954 to 1961.

== Early life and education ==
Hodges was born Martha Elizabeth Blakeney on September 12, 1897 to Rochel Edward Blakeney and Margaret Houston Blakeney. She was a great-great-granddaughter of American Revolutionary War veteran Captain John Blakeney.

She grew up in Monroe, North Carolina. Following the death of both of her parents, she and her five sisters went to live with their grandmother, Susan Covington Houston, who also lived in Monroe. Following her grandmother's death in 1913, Hodges and her sisters went to live with their uncle, Richard Brewer, in Wake Forest. The following year, she enrolled at the Woman's College of the University of North Carolina in Greensboro, from which graduated in June 1918. She completed graduate work at the Columbia University and the University of Chicago.

== Career and public life ==
Following her college graduation, Hodges taught at Leasksville-Spray High School in Rockingham County for three years and served as the school's principal in her third year. She also served as head of the history department for two years at Greensboro High School.

In 1952, her husband was elected lieutenant governor of North Carolina. Upon his taking office, she became the state's second lady. When Governor William B. Umstead died in office in 1954, her husband succeeded him as governor, and she became the state's first lady. As first lady, Hodges was known for entertaining guests at the North Carolina Executive Mansion, hosting tea parties, formal dinners, and musicals for various civic groups and dignitaries. She developed a policy for tour hours and social gatherings at the mansion. She employed a part-time secretary to assist her with scheduling and correspondence.

Hodges travelled the state with her husband to attend ribbon cuttings and other official events and was in charge of managing the mansion's household and gardens. As flower arranging was one of her favorite hobbies, she took on designing the floral arrangements used at the mansion.

Following the end of her husband's term, he was appointed as the U.S. Secretary of Commerce by President John F. Kennedy and the couple moved to Washington, D.C. While in the nation's capitol, she served as president of the International Neighbors Club, an organization made up of the wives of ambassadors, congressmen, senators, and other government officials. During this time, she became personal friends with Jacqueline Bouvier Kennedy and Lady Bird Johnson.

== Personal life ==
While working as a teacher, she met Luther H. Hodges, then an official at Marshall Field Mills. They married on June 24, 1922 in a ceremony at the home of her uncle, W.S. Blakeney. The wedding was officiated by the Moravian bishop Howard E. Rondthaler, the president of Salem College. The Hodges had three children: Betsy Blakeney, Nancy Houston, and Luther Jr.

She was fond of art and attended weekly art history lectures at the North Carolina Museum of Art.

In 1950, she moved to West Germany, where her husband was employed as chief of the industry division of the Economic Cooperation Administration.

In 1965, she and her husband moved to Chapel Hill, North Carolina. On June 26, 1969, their home caught fire. She was found unconscious in a first floor bedroom and died the following day of smoke inhalation and asphyxiation. She was buried in Overlook Cemetery in Eden.
