= Lindsey Prather =

American politician

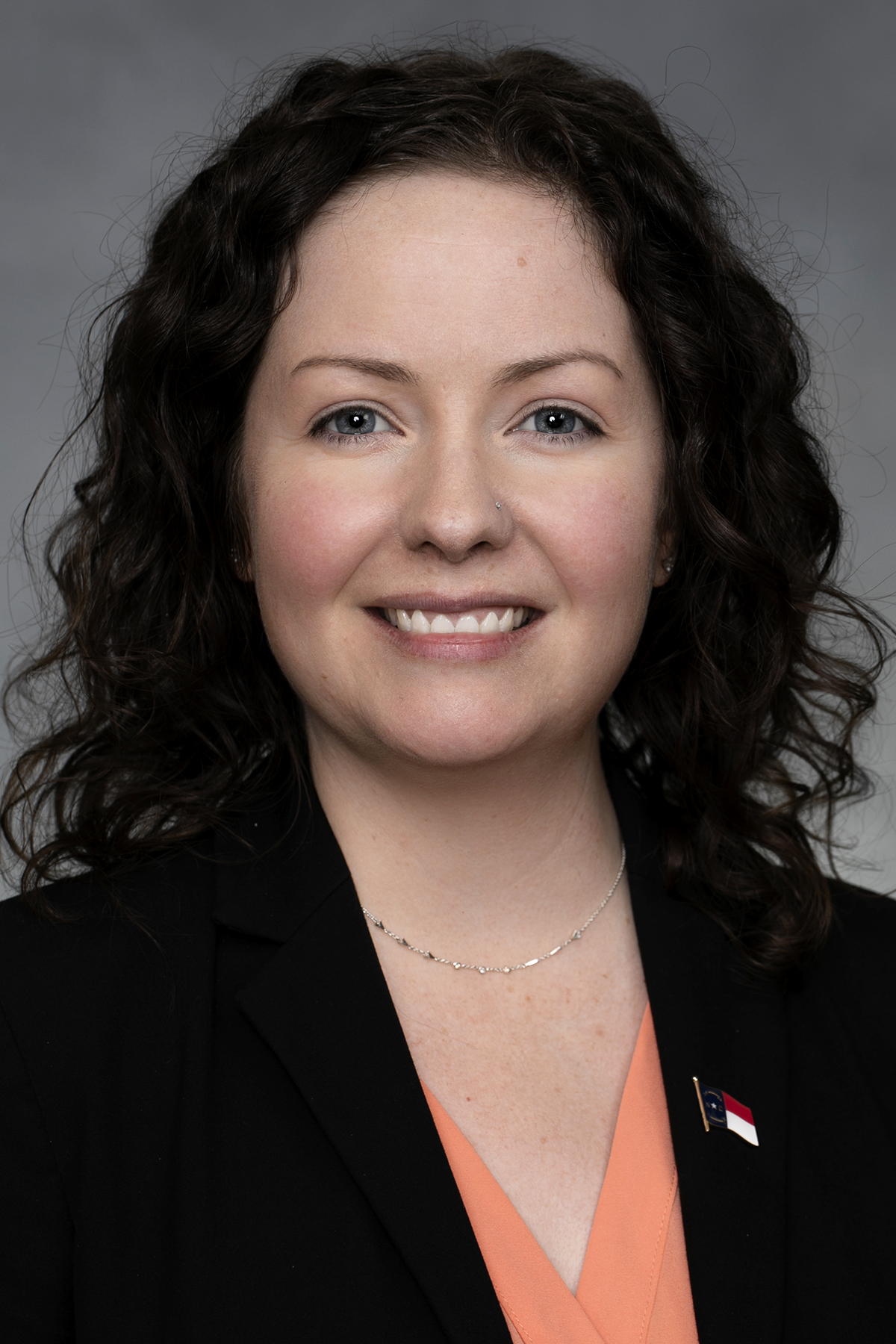

Member of the North Carolina House of Representatives from the 115th district
- Incumbent
- Assumed office January 1, 2023
- Preceded by: Brian Turner (redistricting)

Personal details
- Born: Lindsey Anne Prather; June 21, 1988 (age 38) Raleigh, North Carolina, U.S.
- Party: Democratic
- Spouse: Eric
- Education: University of North Carolina, Asheville (BA); Western Carolina University (MPA)

Lindsey Prather is an educator and American politician serving as a member of the North Carolina House of Representatives from the 115th district.

== Personal life ==
Prather grew up in North Carolina and attended North Carolina Public Schools.

She has an identical twin sister, Rachel, who teaches public school in North Carolina.

== Professional career ==
Prather is a professional educator who spent six years teaching Special Education and Social Studies in Buncombe Public Schools. She was a member of the Teaching Fellows program through the University of North Carolina System.

She now serves as the Assistant Director of Admissions at the University of North Carolina at Asheville, assisting transfer students and veterans.

== Legislative career ==
=== Committee assignments ===
2023–24

- Appropriations
- Appropriations, Education
- Education - Community Colleges
- Education - Universities
- Local Government

== Electoral history ==
=== 2024 ===
North Carolina House of Representatives 115th district general election, 2024
Party	Candidate	Votes	%
Democratic	Lindsey Prather (incumbent)	26,203	51.46%
Republican	Ruth Smith	24,720	48.54%
Total votes		50,923	100%
Democratic hold			

=== 2022 ===
North Carolina House of Representatives 115th district general election, 2022
Party	Candidate	Votes	%
Democratic	Lindsey Prather	21,007	57.6%
Republican	Pratik Bhakta	15,481	42.4%
Total votes		36,488	100%
Democratic hold			

North Carolina House of Representatives
Preceded by John Ager	Member of the North Carolina House of Representatives from the 115th district 2023–Present	Incumbent
