= After the Raid =

2019 documentary film

- Film poster
- Directed by: Rodrigo Reyes
- Production company: No Ficción
- Distributed by: Netflix
- Release date: December 19, 2019
- Running time: 24 minutes
- Countries: United States; Mexico
- Language: English

After the Raid is a 2019 documentary film directed by Rodrigo Reyes. The premise revolves around a meatpacking plant in Grainger County, Tennessee where 97 undocumented workers were arrested during a raid in 2018.

== Release ==
After the Raid was released on December 19, 2019, on Netflix.
