= D. Bruce Goforth =

American politician

Daniel Bruce Goforth is a former Democratic member of the North Carolina General Assembly who represented the state's one hundred fifteenth House district, including constituents in Buncombe County. A contractor from Asheville, North Carolina, Goforth served almost four complete terms in the state House. He resigned in 2010 before the end of his fourth term, after losing the Democratic nomination for a fifth term to Patsy Keever.

In 2011, he changed his party to Unaffiliated and began work for the Republican Speaker of the House.

== Environment ==
Environment North Carolina, a statewide 501 (c)3 non-profit, ranked him as the worst environmental legislator in the state in 2007.

North Carolina House of Representatives
| Preceded by Constituency established | Member of the North Carolina House of Representatives from the 115th district 2003-2010 | Succeeded by Patsy Keever |
