= North Carolina's 115th House district =

American legislative district

North Carolina's 115th State House of Representatives district
Representative
Lindsey Prather; D–Enka
- Demographics: 81% White; 2% Black; 10% Hispanic; 1% Asian; 5% Multiracial
- Population (2024): 99,061

North Carolina's 115th House district is one of 120 districts in the North Carolina House of Representatives. It has been represented by Democrat Lindsey Prather since 2023.

== Geography ==
Since 2003, the district has included part of Buncombe County. The district overlaps with the 46th and 49th Senate districts.

== District officeholders since 2003 ==
Representative	Party	Dates	Notes	Counties
District created January 1, 2003.				2003–Present; Part of Buncombe County.
Bruce Goforth (Asheville)	Democratic	January 1, 2003 – July 31, 2010	Lost re-nomination and resigned early.	2003–Present; Part of Buncombe County.
Vacant		July 31, 2010 – September 8, 2010		2003–Present; Part of Buncombe County.
Patsy Keever (Asheville)	Democratic	September 8, 2010 – January 1, 2013	Appointed to finish Goforth's term. Retired to run for Congress.	2003–Present; Part of Buncombe County.
Nathan Ramsey (Fairview)	Republican	January 1, 2013 – January 1, 2015	Lost re-election.	2003–Present; Part of Buncombe County.
John Ager (Fairview)	Democratic	January 1, 2015 – January 1, 2023	Redistricted to the 114th district and retired.	2003–Present; Part of Buncombe County.
Lindsey Prather (Enka)	Democratic	January 1, 2023 – Present		2003–Present; Part of Buncombe County.

== Election results ==
=== 2024 ===
2024 Election results by precinct Prather: 50–60% 60–70% Smith: 40-50% 50–60%

North Carolina House of Representatives 115th district general election, 2024
Party	Candidate	Votes	%
Democratic	Lindsey Prather (incumbent)	26,203	51.46%
Republican	Ruth Smith	24,720	48.54%
Total votes		50,923	100%
Democratic hold			

=== 2022 ===
North Carolina House of Representatives 115th district Republican primary election, 2022
Party	Candidate	Votes	%
Republican	Pratik Bhakta	3,146	50.01%
Republican	Sherry M. Higgins	3,145	49.99%
Total votes		6,291	100%

North Carolina House of Representatives 115th district general election, 2022
Party	Candidate	Votes	%
Democratic	Lindsey Prather	21,007	57.57%
Republican	Pratik Bhakta	15,481	42.43%
Total votes		36,488	100%
Democratic hold			

=== 2020 ===
North Carolina House of Representatives 115th district general election, 2020
Party	Candidate	Votes	%
Democratic	John Ager (incumbent)	31,650	62.31%
Republican	Mark Crawford	19,145	37.69%
Total votes		50,795	100%
Democratic hold			

=== 2018 ===
North Carolina House of Representatives 115th district Republican primary election, 2018
Party	Candidate	Votes	%
Republican	Amy Evans	1,075	52.03%
Republican	Nathan West	991	47.97%
Total votes		2,066	100%

North Carolina House of Representatives 115th district general election, 2018
Party	Candidate	Votes	%
Democratic	John Ager (incumbent)	23,683	58.28%
Republican	Amy Evans	16,953	41.72%
Total votes		40,636	100%
Democratic hold			

=== 2016 ===
North Carolina House of Representatives 115th district Republican primary election, 2016
Party	Candidate	Votes	%
Republican	Frank Mortez	4,842	58.98%
Republican	Robert "Bob" Chilmonik	3,367	41.02%
Total votes		8,209	100%

North Carolina House of Representatives 115th district general election, 2016
Party	Candidate	Votes	%
Democratic	John Ager (incumbent)	25,257	55.58%
Republican	Frank Mortez	20,183	44.42%
Total votes		40,636	100%
Democratic hold			

=== 2014 ===
North Carolina House of Representatives 115th district general election, 2014
Party	Candidate	Votes	%
Democratic	John Ager	15,523	50.81%
Republican	Nathan Ramsey (incumbent)	15,027	49.19%
Total votes		30,550	100%
Democratic gain from Republican			

=== 2012 ===
North Carolina House of Representatives 115th district general election, 2012
Party	Candidate	Votes	%
Republican	Nathan Ramsey	23,118	54.32%
Democratic	Susan E. Wilson	19,438	45.68%
Total votes		42,556	100%
Republican gain from Democratic			

=== 2010 ===
North Carolina House of Representatives 115th district Democratic primary election, 2010
Party	Candidate	Votes	%
Democratic	Patsy Keever	3,683	59.75%
Democratic	Bruce Goforth (incumbent)	2,481	40.25%
Total votes		6,164	100%

North Carolina House of Representatives 115th district general election, 2010
Party	Candidate	Votes	%
Democratic	Patsy Keever (incumbent)	15,775	56.22%
Republican	Mark Crawford	12,282	43.78%
Total votes		28,057	100%
Democratic hold			

=== 2008 ===
North Carolina House of Representatives 115th district general election, 2008
Party	Candidate	Votes	%
Democratic	Bruce Goforth (incumbent)	27,795	67.42%
Republican	Paul Purdue	13,429	32.58%
Total votes		41,224	100%
Democratic hold			

=== 2006 ===
North Carolina House of Representatives 115th district Republican primary election, 2006
Party	Candidate	Votes	%
Republican	Eric Gorny	806	57.53%
Republican	Bill Reynolds	595	42.47%
Total votes		1,401	100%

North Carolina House of Representatives 115th district general election, 2006
Party	Candidate	Votes	%
Democratic	Bruce Goforth (incumbent)	18,584	67.64%
Republican	Eric Gorny	8,892	32.36%
Total votes		27,476	100%
Democratic hold			

=== 2004 ===
North Carolina House of Representatives 115th district general election, 2004
Party	Candidate	Votes	%
Democratic	Bruce Goforth (incumbent)	20,957	59.95%
Republican	Barbara Boyd	13,002	37.19%
Libertarian	Robert Parker	999	2.86%
Total votes		34,958	100%
Democratic hold			

=== 2002 ===
2002 North Carolina House of Representatives 115th district Democratic primary election, 2002
Party	Candidate	Votes	%
Democratic	Bruce Goforth	2,812	74.65%
Democratic	Michael Morgan	955	25.35%
Total votes		3,767	100%

2002 North Carolina House of Representatives 115th district general election, 2002
Party	Candidate	Votes	%
Democratic	Bruce Goforth	11,320	50.70%
Republican	Mark Crawford (incumbent)	10,405	46.60%
Libertarian	Robert Parker	601	2.69%
Total votes		22,326	100%
Democratic gain from Republican			
