= James R. Young (North Carolina politician) =

American politician and insurance salesman

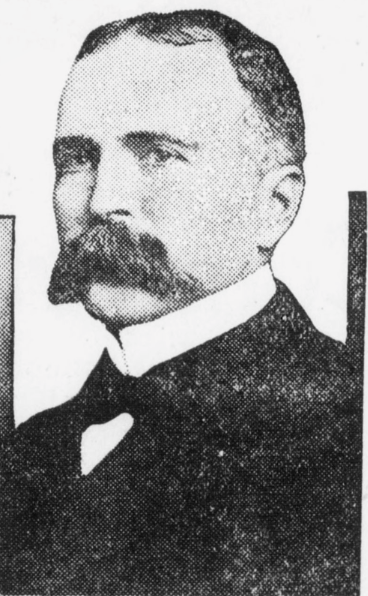
Young c. 1916

James Richard Young (17 February 1853 – 25 April 1937) was an American politician and insurance salesman who served as the first North Carolina Commissioner of Insurance.

== Early life ==
Born in 1853 in what was then Granville County, North Carolina, Young was educated at the Horner School and Hampden-Sydney College and established an insurance agency in Henderson. He also became the first clerk of court for the new county of Vance and served from 1881 to 1890. Before 1880 he married Annie Eliza Southerland (1857–1894), with whom he had at least four children.

== Political career ==
On March 6, 1899, the North Carolina General Assembly created the Department of Insurance to regulate its namesake industry in the state. The agency was to be led by a commissioner of insurance, who was to be appointed by the governor to two-year terms, though the legislature selected the first commissioner; the day the insurance department was created, the legislature elected Young to the commissionership. He was sworn in to office on March 9. He was gubernatorially appointed reappointed to the post in 1901 and 1905. Following the amendment of the state constitution providing for the popular election of the insurance commissioner, Young was elected to the office in 1908. He left office in January 1921.

== Later life ==
Young returned to the private insurance business after leaving office. He retired in 1935 due to poor health and died on April 25, 1937, at his home in Raleigh and was buried at the Elmwood Cemetery in Henderson.

== Works cited ==
- North Carolina Manual (PDF). Raleigh: North Carolina Department of the Secretary of State. 2011. OCLC 2623953. Archived from the original (PDF) on 2023-08-02.

Party political offices
First	Democratic nominee for North Carolina Commissioner of Insurance; 1908, 1912, 1916	Succeeded by Stacey W. Wade
