= Stacey W. Wade =

American politician and businessman

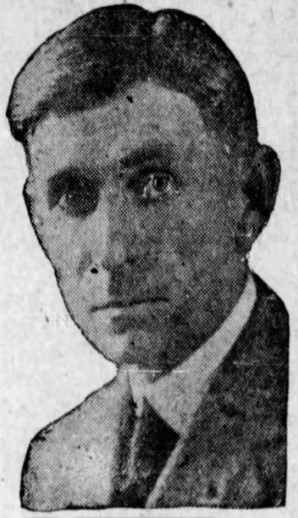

North Carolina Secretary of State
- In office 1933 – November 16, 1936
- Governor: John C. B. Ehringhaus
- Preceded by: James A. Hartness
- Succeeded by: Charles G. Powell

North Carolina Commissioner of Insurance
- In office January 12, 1921 – November 15, 1927
- Governor: Cameron A. Morrison; Angus W. McLean
- Preceded by: James R. Young
- Succeeded by: Daniel C. Boney

Personal details
- Born: August 18, 1875 Carteret County, North Carolina, U.S.
- Died: January 19, 1956 (aged 80) Raleigh, North Carolina, U.S.
- Party: Democratic

Stacey Wilson Wade (August 18, 1875 – January 19, 1956) was an American politician and businessman who served as North Carolina Commissioner of Insurance from 1921 to 1927 and North Carolina Secretary of State from 1933 to 1936.

== Early life ==
Stacey Wilson Wade was born on August 18, 1875, in Carteret County, North Carolina. Educated in Morehead City, he moved to Raleigh in 1909 to work as a clerk for the North Carolina General Assembly.

== Political career ==
Wade was elected North Carolina Commissioner of Insurance in 1920. He was sworn in to office on January 12, 1921. He resigned on November 15, 1927, to take a position as vice president of the Home Mortgage Company of Durham. In 1930, he quit the company and founded an insurance firm, Stacey W. Wade and Son.

In 1932, Wade was elected North Carolina Secretary of State. He was sworn in on January 6, 1933. He resigned the office on November 16, 1936, to accept the position of manager of the Eastern North Carolina District of the U.S. Social Security Board. In 1942, he left the Social Security Board and created the Southern Coach Company, of which he served as president until his death.

== Later life ==
Wade experienced a heart attack on January 10, 1956. He died at Rex Hospital in Raleigh nine days later.

Party political offices
| Preceded by James R. Young | Democratic nominee for North Carolina Commissioner of Insurance; 1920, 1924 | Succeeded by Daniel C. Boney |
| Preceded by James A. Hartness | Democratic nominee for North Carolina Secretary of State; 1932 | Succeeded by Thad A. Eure |
