= 1956 North Carolina gubernatorial election =

- November 6, 1956
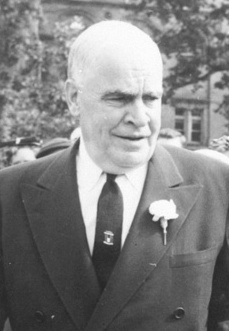

Nominee	Luther H. Hodges	Kyle Hayes
Party	Democratic	Republican
Popular vote	760,480	375,379
Percentage	66.95%	33.05%
- County results Hodges: 50–60% 60–70% 70–80% 80–90% >90% Hayes: 50–60% 60–70% 70–80%
Governor before election
Luther H. Hodges
Democratic
Elected Governor
Luther H. Hodges
Democratic

The 1956 North Carolina gubernatorial election was held on November 6, 1956. Incumbent Democrat Luther H. Hodges defeated Republican nominee Kyle Hayes with 66.95% of the vote.

This election was unusual for North Carolina at the time, in that a sitting Governor ran for another term. The Constitution of North Carolina at the time had a one-term limit for governors, but Hodges, as lieutenant governor, had succeeded William B. Umstead after the latter died in office, and was running for a full four-year term on his own. In 1977, the state's voters approved an amendment to the state constitution permitting the governor to serve two consecutive four-year terms.

== Primary elections ==
Primary elections were held on May 26, 1956.

=== Democratic primary ===
==== Candidates ====
- Luther H. Hodges, incumbent Governor
- Thomas B. Sawyer
- Harry P. Stokely
- C.E. Earle Jr.

19.2% of the voting age population participated in the Democratic primary.

==== Results ====
Democratic primary results
Party	Candidate	Votes	%
Democratic	Luther H. Hodges (incumbent)	401,082	85.95
Democratic	Thomas B. Sawyer	29,248	6.27
Democratic	Harry P. Stokely	24,416	5.23
Democratic	C.E. Earle Jr.	11,908	2.55
Total votes		466,654	100.00

== General election ==
=== Candidates ===
- Luther H. Hodges, Democratic
- Kyle Hayes, Republican

=== Results ===
1956 North Carolina gubernatorial election
Party	Candidate	Votes	%	±%
Democratic	Luther H. Hodges (incumbent)	760,480	66.95%	
Republican	Kyle Hayes	375,379	33.05%	
Majority		385,101		
Turnout		1,135,859		
Democratic hold		Swing		

== Works cited ==
- Steed, Robert; Moreland, Laurence; Baker, Tod, eds. (1980). Party Politics in the South. Praeger Publishers. ISBN 0030565863.
