= Luther H. Hodges Jr. =

American politician and banker (born 1936)

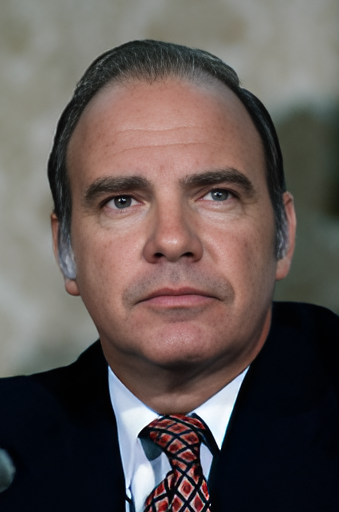
- Hodges in 1980

United States Secretary of Commerce
- Acting; October 31, 1979 – January 9, 1980
- President: Jimmy Carter
- Preceded by: Juanita M. Kreps
- Succeeded by: Philip Klutznick

1st United States Deputy Secretary of Commerce
- In office September 8, 1980 – January 20, 1981
- President: Jimmy Carter
- Preceded by: Sidney Harman as Under Secretary of Commerce
- Succeeded by: Joseph F. Wright

Personal details
- Born: Luther Hartwell Hodges Jr. November 19, 1936 (age 89) Leaksville (now Eden, North Carolina)
- Parent(s): Luther H. Hodges; Martha Elizabeth Blakeney
- Education: University of North Carolina; Harvard University
- Profession: Businessman, politician

Luther Hartwell Hodges Jr. (born November 19, 1936) is a retired American politician and banker. He served as the United States secretary of commerce from 1979 to 1980 and as the United States deputy secretary of commerce from 1980 to 1981 within the Carter administration. He is the son of Luther H. Hodges, who was secretary of commerce under John F. Kennedy and Lyndon B. Johnson between 1961 and 1965, and the 64th governor of North Carolina.

== Early life and education ==
Hodges was born on November 19, 1936, in Leaksville (now Eden), North Carolina to Martha Blakeney Hodges and Luther H. Hodges. In 1957, he received a Bachelor of Arts in economics from the University of North Carolina at Chapel Hill. In 1961, he received a Master of Business Administration from Harvard Business School.

In 1961, he became a research associate and corporate finance teacher at the University of North Carolina at Chapel Hill.

== Career ==
From 1962 to 1977, Hodges worked for North Carolina National Bank alongside Hugh McColl, eventually rising to the position of chairman. The bank eventually became NationsBank and later Bank of America.

Hodges entered politics in 1978, running for the nomination of the Democrats in the United States Senate election in North Carolina, 1978. He won the first round of the primary, with 40% of the vote, but, having failed to receive the 50% required to win on the first ballot, lost to populist North Carolina Commissioner of Insurance John Ingram with only 46% in the run-off.

Between 1980 and 1981, Hodges was the first United States Deputy Secretary of Commerce, appointed by Jimmy Carter. Previously Under Secretary of Commerce, he had been tapped to replace Juanita M. Kreps as United States Secretary of Commerce, but, after a spell as Acting Secretary, the job went to Philip Klutznick, and the new Deputy Secretary position was created for him.

From 1980 to 1990, he was chairman of Washington Bancorp, the parent company of The Bank of Washington.

Later, Hodges owned the Hotel Santa Fe in Santa Fe, New Mexico.

In 2016, Hodges wrote a book, Bank Notes: An Inside Look at the Launching of North Carolina's Banking Ascendancy and a Commentary on the Current New World of Banking.

Hodges also is a former member of the Board of Governors of the University of North Carolina and is a past chairman of the College of Santa Fe. He has also served as a trustee of American University and of Johnson C. Smith University. He is a director of Homeowners of America Insurance Corporation, Atmocean, Inc., and H&H Medical Technologies. He has also served as a member of the board of directors of the North Carolina State Ports Authority.

== Political contributions ==
Hodges began his political career as a Democrat, but later changed to Republican. In 2004, Hodges contributed more than $30,000 to Republican candidates including George W. Bush, Dick Cheney, and Senator Richard Burr. In 2012, Hodges contributed over $51,000 to Republican candidates and organizations including Mitt Romney, Renee Ellmers, (R-NC) and Virginia Foxx (R-NC).
