= 1952 North Carolina lieutenant gubernatorial election =

- November 4, 1952
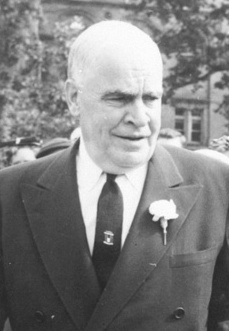

Nominee	Luther H. Hodges	Warren H. Pritchard
Party	Democratic	Republican
Popular vote	783,792	374,530
Percentage	67.67%	32.33%
Lieutenant Governor before election
Hoyt Patrick Taylor
Democratic
Elected Lieutenant Governor
Luther H. Hodges
Democratic

The 1952 North Carolina lieutenant gubernatorial election was held on November 4, 1952. Democratic nominee Luther H. Hodges defeated Republican nominee Warren H. Pritchard with 67.67% of the vote.

== Primary elections ==
Primary elections were held on May 31, 1952.

=== Democratic primary ===
==== Candidates ====
- Luther H. Hodges, former member of the North Carolina Highway and Public Works Commission
- Roy H. Rowe, State Senator
- Benjamin J. McDonald
- Marshall C. Kurfees, Mayor of Winston-Salem

==== Results ====
Democratic primary results
Party	Candidate	Votes	%
Democratic	Luther H. Hodges	227,167	47.41
Democratic	Roy H. Rowe	151,077	31.53
Democratic	Benjamin J. McDonald	52,916	11.05
Democratic	Marshall C. Kurfees	47,955	10.01
Total votes		479,115	100.00

=== Republican primary ===
==== Candidates ====
- Warren H. Pritchard
- William G. Lehew

==== Results ====
Republican primary results
Party	Candidate	Votes	%
Republican	Warren H. Pritchard	13,463	82.79
Republican	William G. Lehew	2,798	17.21
Total votes		16,261	100.00

== General election ==
=== Candidates ===
- Luther H. Hodges, Democratic
- Warren H. Pritchard, Republican

=== Results ===
1952 North Carolina lieutenant gubernatorial election
Party	Candidate	Votes	%	±%
Democratic	Luther H. Hodges	783,792	67.67%	
Republican	Warren H. Pritchard	374,530	32.33%	
Majority		409,262		
Turnout				
Democratic hold		Swing		
