= Frederick H. Mueller =

American politician

Frederick Mueller
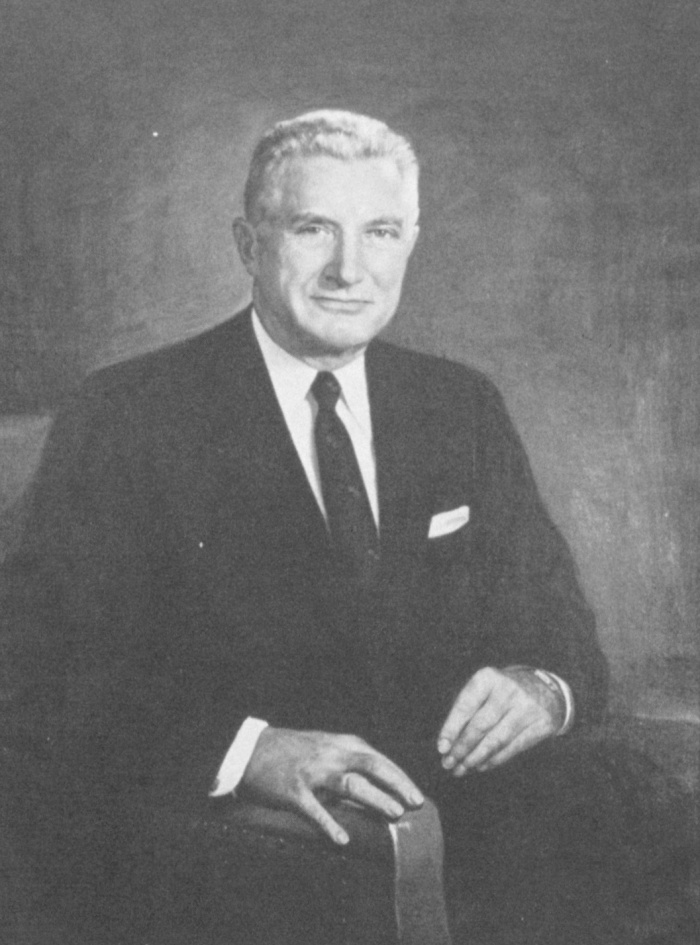

14th United States Secretary of Commerce
- In office June 30, 1959 – January 19, 1961; Acting: June 30, 1959 – August 10, 1959
- President: Dwight D. Eisenhower
- Preceded by: Lewis Strauss (acting)
- Succeeded by: Luther H. Hodges

Personal details
- Born: November 22, 1893 Grand Rapids, Michigan, U.S.
- Died: August 31, 1976 (aged 82) Sarasota, Florida, U.S.
- Party: Republican
- Spouse: Mary Darrah
- Children: 2
- Education: Michigan State University (BS)

Frederick Henry Mueller (November 22, 1893 – August 31, 1976) was a U.S. cabinet officer. He served as the United States Secretary of Commerce from 1959 until 1961, during the administration of President Dwight D. Eisenhower.

== Early life ==
Mueller was born in Grand Rapids, Michigan, the son of Emma Matilde Oesterle and furniture manufacturer John Frederick Mueller.

== Education ==
He graduated from Michigan State University in 1914, with a bachelor's degree in mechanical engineering.

== Career ==
Upon his father's retirement, he became president of the family business.

Prior to joining the Eisenhower administration, Mueller served in multiple posts at the Department of Commerce. In 1956, Mueller was charged with the heading of the Division of Domestic Affairs as Assistant Secretary of Commerce for Domestic Affairs until 1958 when he was elevated to Undersecretary of Commerce. He held this position until he was elevated to Secretary of Commerce in 1959.

== Personal life ==
He married the former Mary Darrah on November 6, 1915; they had two children, Marcia Joan and Frederick Eugene Mueller.

== Death ==
Mueller died in Sarasota, Florida, on August 31, 1976, at age 82. He is interred in Graceland Mausoleum in Grand Rapids, Michigan.

Political offices
Preceded by Lewis Strauss	United States Secretary of Commerce; 1959–1961	Succeeded by Luther H. Hodges
