= James E. Long =

American politician

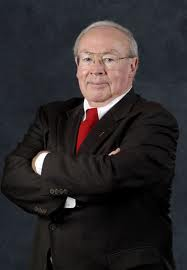

9th North Carolina Commissioner of Insurance
- In office January 5, 1985 – January 10, 2009
- Governor: Jim Hunt; James G. Martin; Mike Easley
- Preceded by: John Ingram
- Succeeded by: Wayne Goodwin

Personal details
- Born: March 29, 1940 Burlington, North Carolina
- Died: February 9, 2009 (aged 68) Raleigh, North Carolina
- Resting place: Pine Hill City Cemetery; Burlington, North Carolina
- Party: Democratic
- Spouse: Mary Margaret "Peg" O'Connell
- Children: 2
- Education: North Carolina State University; University of North Carolina, Chapel Hill
- Profession: Politician

James Eugene Long (March 19, 1940 – February 2, 2009) was the North Carolina Commissioner of Insurance from 1985 through 2009 retiring as the senior Democratic member of the North Carolina Council of State. He was the third-longest-serving statewide elected official in North Carolina history as of 2009.

== Early life ==
James Eugene Long was born on March 19, 1940, in Burlington, North Carolina, to George Attmore Long and Helen Brooks Long. He attended Burlington public school and graduated from Walter M. Williams High School in 1958. From 1958 to 1962 he studied at North Carolina State University, where he was a member of Tau Kappa Epsilon fraternity, and the following year he attended and graduated from the University of North Carolina at Chapel Hill with a bachelor's degree. He earned a Juris Doctor from the University of North Carolina School of Law in 1966.

== Political career ==
Long served in the North Carolina House of Representatives (1971–1975) as had his father and grandfather. He also worked as legal counsel to the state house speaker and as Chief Deputy Commissioner of the North Carolina Department of Insurance from 1975 to 1976. Commissioner John R. Ingram fired Long as his deputy in 1976 and Long ran unsuccessfully against his former boss in 1980.

Long became the state's insurance commissioner in January 1985 having been elected in November 1984. He won a sixth term in the 2004 statewide elections. In 2008 he chose not to run for a seventh term. Long endorsed Wayne Goodwin to succeed him as Commissioner of Insurance.

== Personal life ==
Long was married to Peg O'Connell and had two children -Dr.Rebecca Long & James Long, and five grandchildren -Steven Long, Morgan Long, Matthew McNeal, Hannah Englehart and Kristin Mcneal Vatcher. In 2009, less than one month after leaving office as Insurance Commissioner, Long suffered a hemorrhagic stroke leaving him in a coma. He died at Rex Hospital in Raleigh on February 2, aged 68.

== Works cited ==
- Marcus, Lisa A., ed. (1994). North Carolina Manual 1993–1994 (PDF). Raleigh: North Carolina Secretary of State. OCLC 244121350.

Party political offices
Preceded by John Ingram	Democratic nominee for North Carolina Commissioner of Insurance; 1984, 1988, 1992, 1996, 2000, 2004	Succeeded by Wayne Goodwin
