= George Attmore Long =

American politician

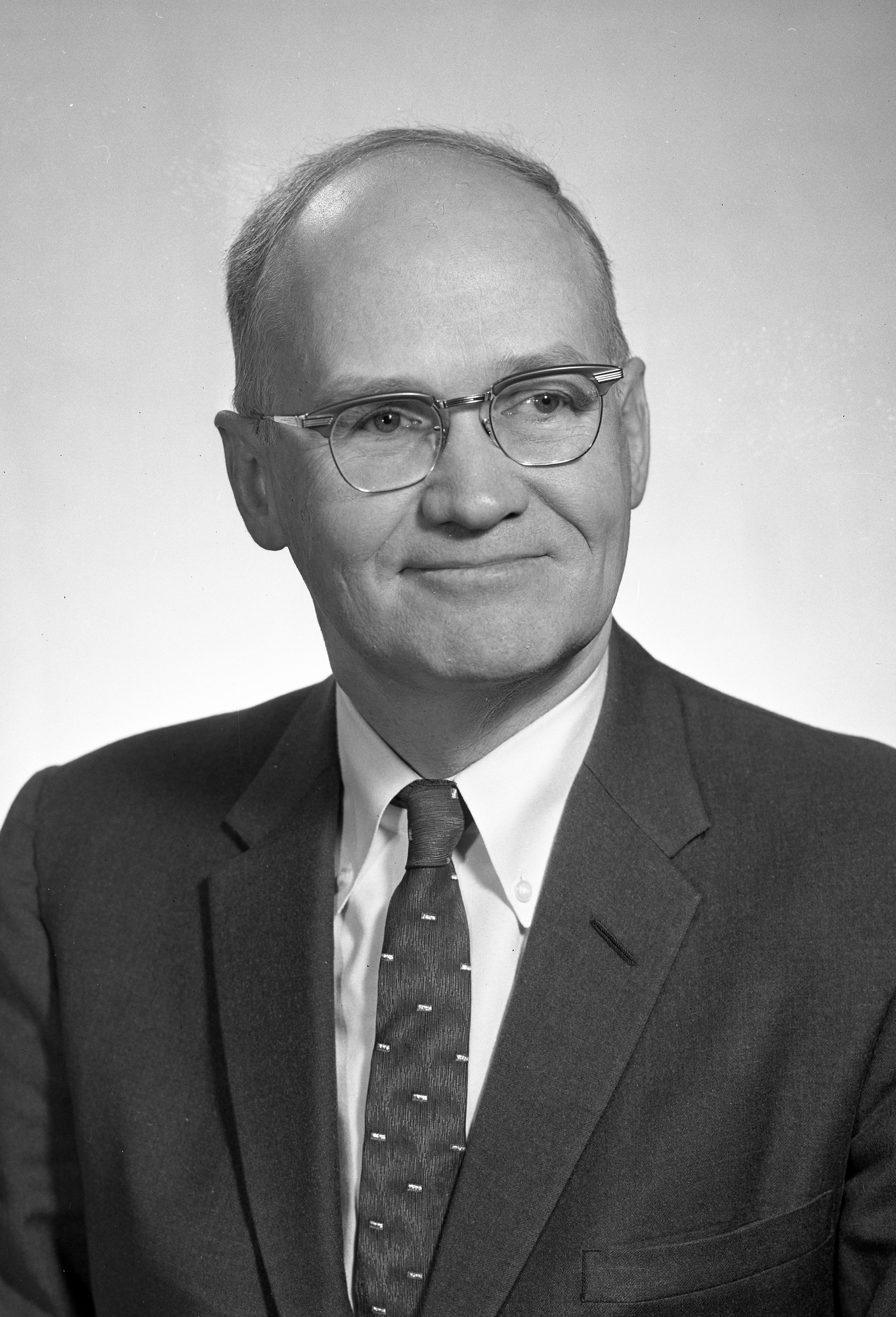
Long c. 1959

George Attmore Long (March 10, 1911 – January 5, 1999) was an American lawyer and politician who served in the North Carolina House of Representatives from 1950 until 1960.

== Early life ==
George Attmore Long was born on March 10, 1911, in Graham, North Carolina, United States to J. Dolph Long, a lawyer and member of the North Carolina House of Representatives, and Hannah Oliver Attmore Long. He attended Graham public schools from 1919 to 1926. He did well in school, and enrolled at the University of North Carolina at Chapel Hill at the age of 15. Long graduated in 1930 as a member of the Phi Beta Kappa honor society and attended the University of North Carolina School of Law. He married Helen Brooks on October 16, 1937, and had three children with her, including future politician James E. Long.

== Career ==
Long practiced law in Graham, initially with his father, from 1932 until 1988. He was a member of the Alamance Bar Association and served as president of the North Carolina Bar Association from 1964 to 1965. He also at one point led the Alamance chapter of the Democratic Party.

Long worked as a solicitor in the Alamance General County Court from 1943 to 1946. He then served as a judge from 1948 to 1950. He chaired the Burlington Planning Board from 1950 to 1951 and served in the North Carolina House of Representatives from 1950 until 1960. He frequently wore a red tie while at work.

== Later life ==
Long died on January 5, 1999, at Alamance Regional Medical Center in Burlington, North Carolina, after suffering from a brief illness.

== Works cited ==
- North Carolina Manual. Raleigh: North Carolina Secretary of State. 1959. OCLC 244106583.
