= Edwin S. Lanier =

American politician (1901–1983)

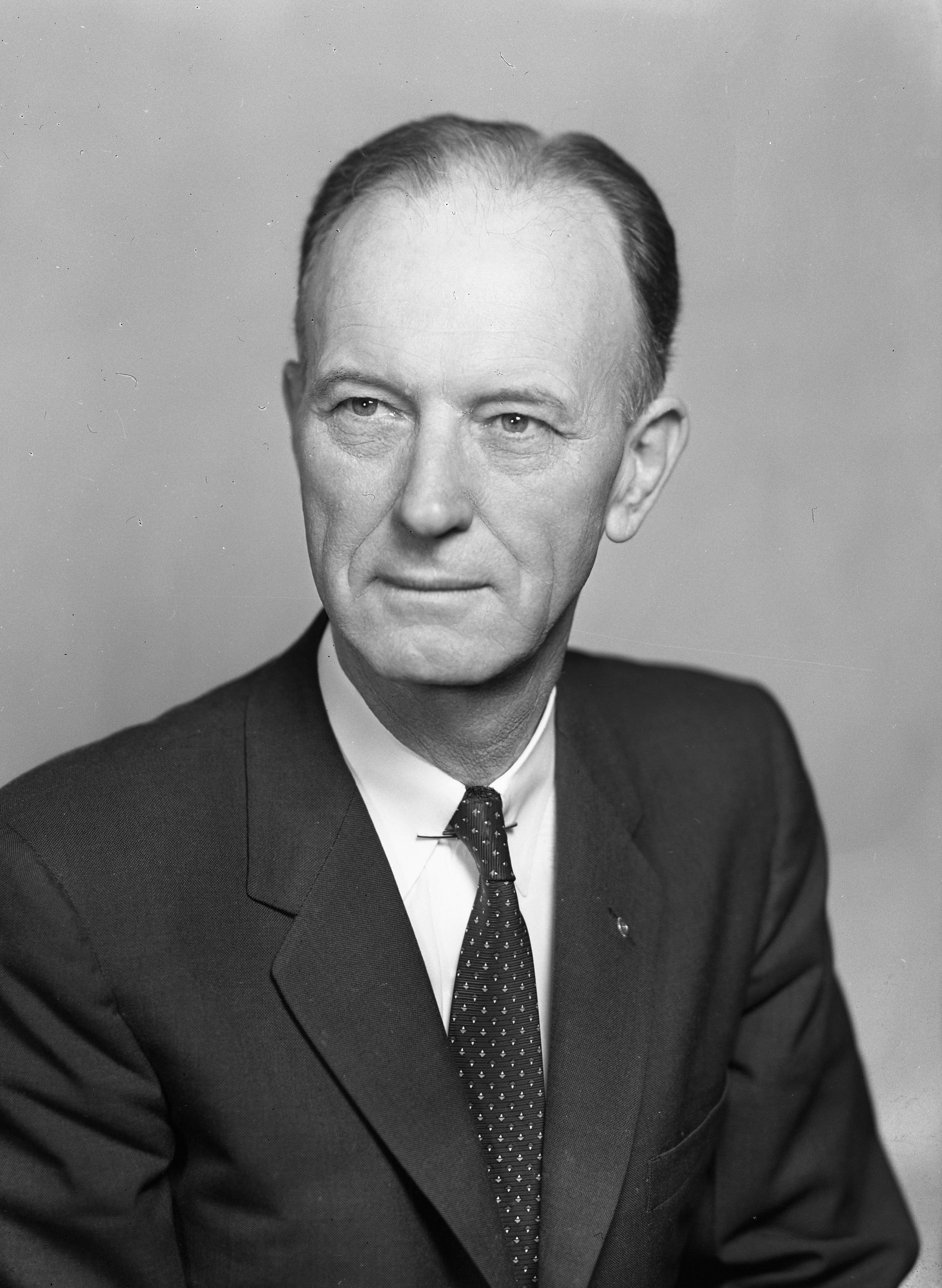

7th North Carolina Commissioner of Insurance
- In office July 16, 1962 – January 10, 1973
- Appointed by: Terry Sanford
- Preceded by: Charles F. Gold
- Succeeded by: John Ingram

Member of the North Carolina Senate from the 16th district
- In office 1957–1961
- Preceded by: Ralph H. Scott
- Succeeded by: Ralph H. Scott

25th Mayor of Chapel Hill, North Carolina
- In office 1949–1954
- Preceded by: R. W. Madry
- Succeeded by: Oliver K. Cornwell

Personal details
- Born: Edwin Sidney Lanier; July 19, 1901 Candler, Georgia, U.S.
- Died: March 5, 1983 (aged 81) Charlotte, North Carolina, U.S.
- Party: Democratic
- Spouse: Nancy Thelma Herndon
- Education: State Normal School; University of North Carolina

Edwin Sidney Lanier (July 19, 1901 – March 5, 1983) was an American Democratic politician, who served as mayor of Chapel Hill, North Carolina, as a member of the North Carolina Senate, and as North Carolina Commissioner of Insurance.

== Early life ==
Edwin Sidney Lanier was born on July 19, 1901, near Metter, Georgia, into a farming family. Graduating from the State Normal Teachers School in Athens in 1921, he enrolled in the University of North Carolina at Chapel Hill. Completing his studies in 1924, he became a teacher and sports coach at a Baptist high school in Thomasville, North Carolina. In 1930, Lanier enrolled in the University of North Carolina School of Law and took a part-time position in the university's student aid office. He ended his studies and became director of student aid in 1934. Eleven years later he took on the additional position of director of records and registration, and he held both university jobs until 1961.

== Political career ==
Lanier served on the Chapel Hill Board of Aldermen from 1945 to 1949 and on the Orange County Board of Commissioners from 1954 to 1956. In 1957, he was elected to the North Carolina Senate, representing the 16th district. He won reelected two years later.

In 1961, North Carolina Governor Terry Sanford appointed Lanier state personnel director. In 1962, the incumbent North Carolina Commissioner of Insurance, Charles F. Gold, died, and Sanford appointed him to fill the vacancy. Lanier was sworn-in to office on July 16. He won election to a full term in the office later that year, and was reelected in 1964 and 1968. He did not seek reelection in 1972.

== Later life ==
Lanier moved to Charlotte, North Carolina, in 1979. He succumbed to emphysema and died on March 5, 1983, at the Wesleyan Nursing Center in Charlotte.

Party political offices
Preceded by Charles F. Gold	Democratic nominee for North Carolina Commissioner of Insurance; 1962, 1964, 1968	Succeeded by John Ingram
Political offices
Preceded by Charles F. Gold	North Carolina Commissioner of Insurance; 1962–1973	Succeeded by John Ingram
