= 2018 Southeastern Provisions raid =

Immigration raid in Grainger County, Tennessee, U.S.

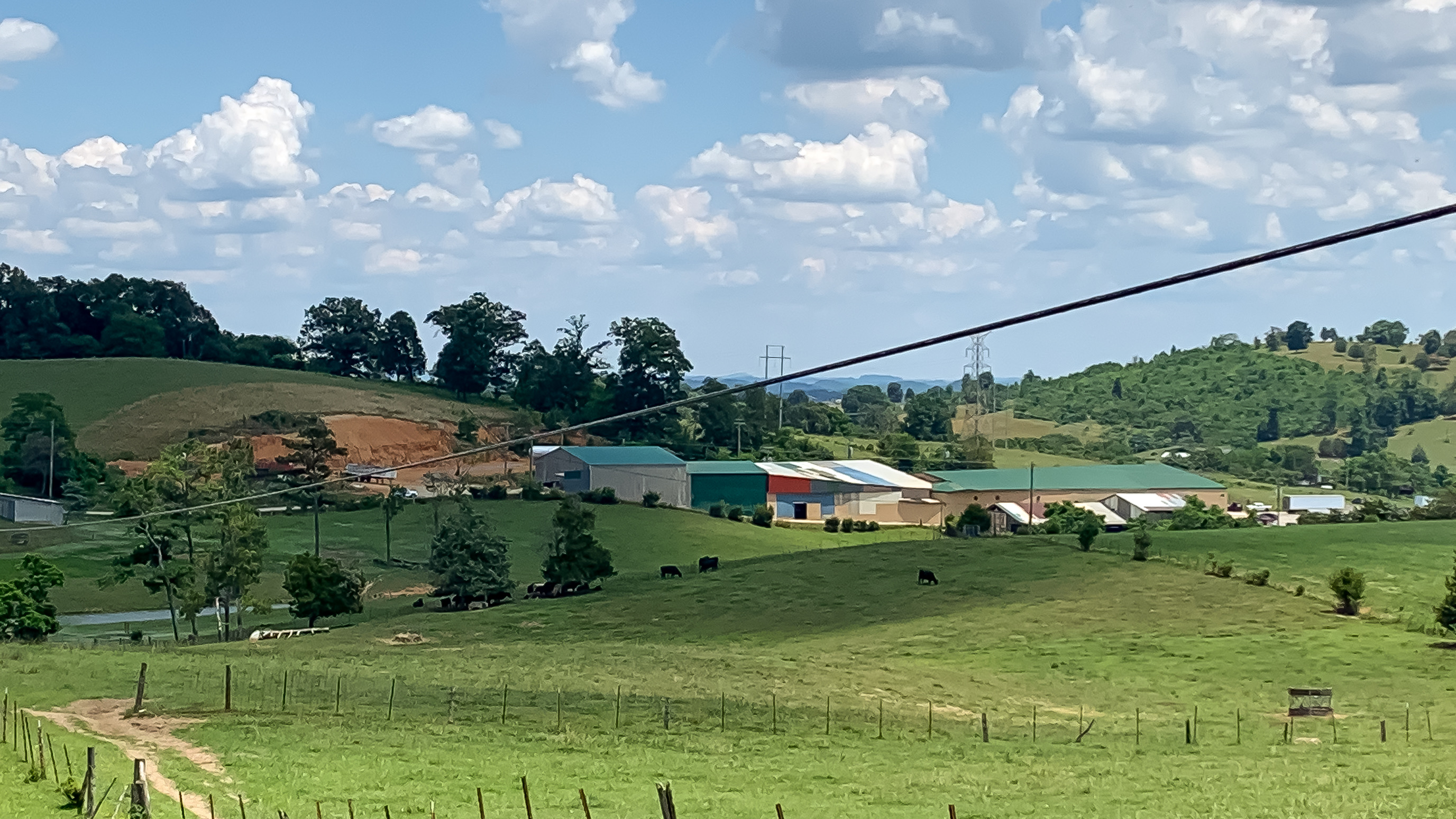
- Southeastern Provisions facility in June 2021
- Date: April 5, 2018
- Time: c. 9:00 a.m. (EDT)
- Venue: Southeastern Provisions LLC slaughterhouse and meatpacking facility
- Location: 1617 Helton Road, Bean Station, Tennessee, United States; 36°17′16″N 83°23′46″W
- Also known as: 2018 Bean Station ICE raid; 2018 Grainger County ICE raid
- Type: Workplace raid
- Cause: Investigation into workplace violations, tax evasion
- Target: James Brantley and undocumented Hispanic workers
- First reporter: Tracey Wolfe of the Grainger Today
- Participants: U.S. Immigration and Customs Enforcement; Internal Revenue Service; Tennessee Highway Patrol
- Outcome: Deportation of undocumented workers; protests against ICE and the Trump administration immigration policy; federal lawsuit against U.S. government
- Arrests: 12
- Suspects: 86
- Charges: Conspiracy to harbor illegal immigrants, wire fraud, tax evasion, violating federal labor and environmental laws
- Sentence: 18 months in Federal Prison Camp, Montgomery

The 2018 Southeastern Provisions raid, also known as the 2018 Bean Station ICE Raid and the 2018 Grainger County ICE raid, was a workplace raid that occurred at Southeastern Provisions, a cattle slaughterhouse and meat-packing facility in rural Grainger County, Tennessee, United States, 9 miles (14 km) west of the town of Bean Station.

The facility was raided by U.S. Immigration and Customs Enforcement (ICE), the Internal Revenue Service (IRS) and the Tennessee Highway Patrol (THP). 11 workers were arrested and 86 more were detained, all of whom were suspected of residing in the United States unlawfully. As of 2021, the event remains one of the largest workplace raids in United States history.

== Southeastern Provisions investigation ==
Southeastern Provisions is a cattle slaughterhouse and meat-packing facility that began operations under the ownership of James Brantley in 1988 in eastern rural Grainger County outside the town of Bean Station. Prior to the raid, the facility was one of the largest sources of employment in the county. In 2017, an investigation into Southeastern Provisions by the IRS after the agency received reports from local banking officials stating that Brantley was making weekly withdrawals of $100,000 to make in-cash payroll for workers. Brantley hired an estimated amount of 150 undocumented workers in an attempt to reduce business expenses.

In May 2017, federal authorities placed an informant at Southeastern Provisions. The individual was hired without documentation and was paid in cash. The informant observed harsh working conditions such as workers handling hazardous materials with no personal protective equipment and another losing several fingers while operating an electric saw.

A month before the raid, Southeastern Provision's sewage treatment system had failed, causing waste containing bodily fluids and parts from slaughtered cattle to disperse into the groundwater of the surrounding area. The Tennessee Department of Environment and Conservation (TDEC) imposed a $12,000 civil penalty on Southeastern Provisions, in addition to mandating that the firm transfer the waste to a licensed facility until a new sewage treatment facility was constructed at the plant site. An investigation by the TDEC found dangerous strands of E. coli and Coliform bacteria in water wells and gardens in the homes of the neighborhoods located south from the facility. Bean Station, the town nearest to Southeastern Provisions, did not have a sewer system for the excess waste to be relocated to, prompting the TDEC to mandate a "pump and dump" plan, which forced Southeastern Provisions to pump sewage from the facility onto trucks where they would be transferred to wastewater facilities in nearby municipalities such as Morristown and Greeneville until the new sewer plant was constructed at the plant.

== The raid ==
On April 5, 2018, a federal search warrant executed by the ICE, IRS, and the THP had the agencies raid Southeastern Provisions around 9:00 a.m EST. Federal agents had discovered 104 undocumented workers employed at the facility, detaining 86 and arresting 11. IRS officials had obtained information concluding that Brantley had paid the undocumented workers at a rate of $8–$10 an hour, with no extra pay for overtime. Law enforcement officials had surrounded the perimeter of the plant's complex, blocking every exit with armed officers telling those inside to freeze.

Workers at the plant reported that federal agents targeted those of Hispanic descent, yelling racial slurs at the nearly 100 Latino workers of Southeastern Provisions, and ordering them to stop working immediately and raise their hands. White workers were reportedly ordered to stay put, with some allowed to smoke on site. Agents used aggressive force against plant workers such as kicking, punching, and holding one worker at gunpoint while urinating. Reymunda Lopez, one of the detained plant workers, described the raid as a hostile situation, "They gathered us in the middle of all of the cattle, and told us to put our hands behind our heads, and not to resist arrest because if they did they were going to hand cuff us."

Those detained were sent to a National Guard center in Morristown in neighboring Hamblen County, where they were questioned by ICE personnel. Families of the detained gathered where they found out whether their family members were released or deported. Fifty-four undocumented laborers were sent to ICE detention facilities in Louisiana and Alabama.

== Aftermath ==
=== Community and political impact ===
In the immediate aftermath of the immigration raid, over 500 Hispanic students in the neighboring city of Morristown skipped school the following day in fear of being deported. Many churches and non-profit organizations in the Morristown-Hamblen area had planned together activities for those who had family or friends involved in the raid. An estimated crowd of 300 individuals led a protest against ICE and the Trump administration, which had recently planned the raids of workplaces across the United States. Fundraising for families impacted received over $60,000 for financial support.

The support given to the immigrant families grew increasingly political in the area surrounding the raid. Politicians from Hamblen and Grainger counties provided various comments on the raid and its impact on their represented communities. Mayor Gary Chesney of Morristown would analyze both sides of the argument, "It involves more focus when things land in our lap. There are many who’ve hollered that we want illegal immigrants gone. At the same time, we don’t think children need to go to bed at night afraid."

In Grainger County, then county mayor Mark Hipsher angered the county's many conservative residents after making statements that provided a perceived sympathetic approach to those detained. When asked to speak about the raid by a Rolling Stone reporter, an unnamed Grainger County Republican politician suggested that the reporter 'expose' a political rival who had allegedly hired undocumented workers.

Following the raid, Southeastern Provisions temporarily closed, causing a disruption in the beef distribution market with an estimated loss of $20 million.

=== Legal action ===
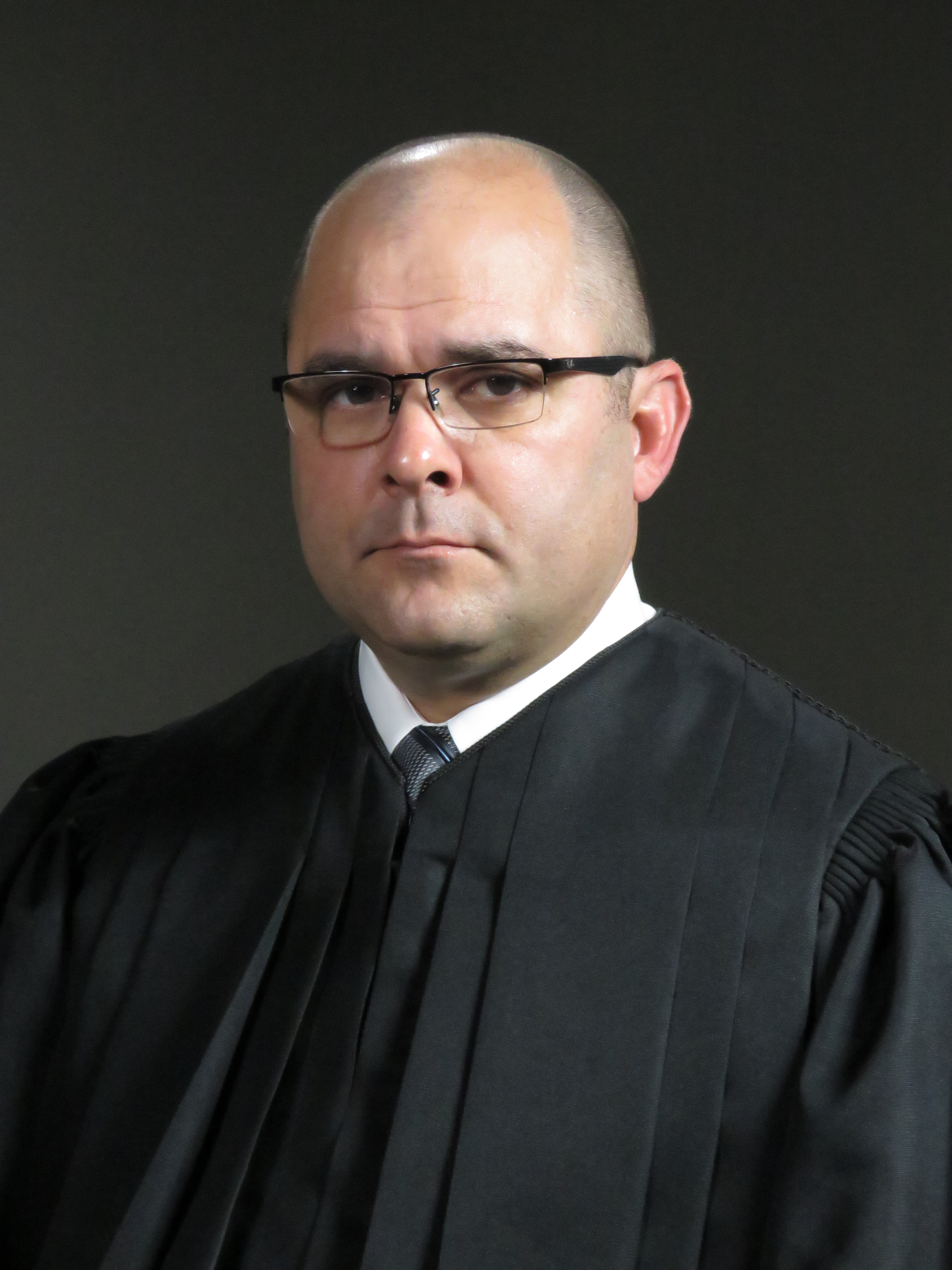
Chief U.S. District of the Eastern District Court of Tennessee Judge Travis R. McDonough provided the judicial opinion in the lawsuit against ICE personnel involved in the raid.

In September 2018, James Brantley was found guilty of multiple state and federal crimes, including tax evasion up to $2.4 million, wire fraud, employing immigrants not authorized to work in the US, and many other workplace violations. He would be sentenced to 18 months in federal prison and was forced to pay over $1.3 million to the IRS, and $1.42 million in restitution.

Workers detained in the raid had filed a lawsuit against ICE with the Southern Poverty Law Center (SPLC) and the National Immigration Law Center (NILC) on their behalf. Despite this, the ICE officials involved had been granted immunity from legal actions, leading to calls from the workers and civil rights groups to lift ICE's immunity so the lawsuit could proceed. The groups would find success two years later when Chief U.S. District Judge Travis R. McDonough published a public appeal to the Supreme Court of the United States to lift the immunity granted to the federal law enforcement officers involved, writing, "Perhaps a higher court will recognize causes of action that more directly address agents’ searches and seizures based on skin color." By April 2021, the United States Department of Homeland Security urged the Eastern District Court of Tennessee to exclude 41 agents involved in the raid from litigation. A final settlement agreement was made between six former employees of the plant, represented by the SPLC and NILC, and the U.S. government on October 19, 2022. The U.S. government would split $475,000 between the six plaintiffs, and also issue an extra $37,000 for two plaintiffs on individual claims. An additional $150,000 was dispersed evenly for the SPLC and NILC to cover attorney fees and expenses. An additional $550,000 was set for a class settlement fund with the nearly 100 employees of Southeastern Provisions at the time eligible for a $5,000 to $6,000 payment. The settlement was finalized on February 28, 2023.

Southeastern Provisions would restart operations in August 2019 under the leadership of the family of James Brantley. While incarcerated, James Brantley filed and signed a consent order agreeing to give an estimated $610,000 in a three-year period in pay to 150 current and former workers of Southeastern Provisions, most of whom are Hispanic, in July 2020. The United States Department of Labor sued Brantley for failing to properly compensate workers at the slaughterhouse. Brantley would be released in January 2021 from a Montgomery, Alabama, work camp. Three years after the events of the raid, Southeastern Provisions encountered another investigation, this time by the Tennessee Occupational Safety and Health Administration, after one of the plant's employees died from on-site injuries.

== In film ==
The consequences of the raid for undocumented workers, their families and members of the impacted communities, were documented in After the Raid, a 2019 documentary film by film director Rodrigo Reyes. The film was released on the streaming platform Netflix.
