= Wayne Goodwin =

American politician in North Carolina

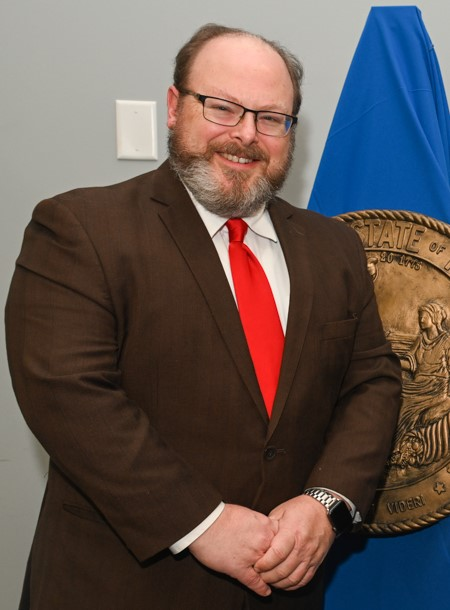
- Goodwin in December 2022

Commissioner of the North Carolina Division of Motor Vehicles
- In office January 14, 2022 – May 6, 2025
- Governor: Roy Cooper; Josh Stein
- Preceded by: Torre Jessup
- Succeeded by: Paul Tine

Chair of the North Carolina Democratic Party
- In office February 11, 2017 – February 27, 2021
- Preceded by: Patsy Keever
- Succeeded by: Bobbie Richardson

Insurance Commissioner of North Carolina
- In office January 10, 2009 – January 1, 2017
- Governor: Bev Perdue; Pat McCrory
- Preceded by: James Long
- Succeeded by: Mike Causey

Member of the North Carolina House of Representatives
- In office January 1, 1997 – January 1, 2005
- Preceded by: Hugh Alfred Lee
- Succeeded by: Melanie Wade Goodwin (redistricted)
- Constituency: 32nd district (1997–2003); 68th district (2003–2005)

Personal details
- Born: February 22, 1967 (age 59) Hamlet, North Carolina, U.S.
- Party: Democratic
- Spouse: Melanie Wade (deceased 2020)
- Education: University of North Carolina, Chapel Hill (BA, JD)

George Wayne Goodwin (born February 22, 1967) is an American politician. He was elected North Carolina Commissioner of Insurance in the 2008 election and re-elected in 2012. He was narrowly defeated in his bid for a third term in 2016. On February 11, 2017, he was elected as chairman of the North Carolina Democratic Party on the first ballot.

Goodwin previously served as a Democratic member of the North Carolina House of Representatives representing House District 32 from 1997 to 2002, which included Richmond, Scotland, and Montgomery counties, and North House District 68, which included Richmond and Stanly counties, from 2003-2005. Goodwin served as the commissioner of the North Carolina Division of Motor Vehicles from 2022 to 2025.

== Political career ==
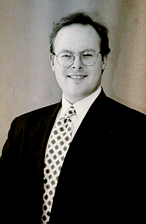
Goodwin as a State Representative

=== State Legislator ===
After serving as President of the Young Democrats of North Carolina, Goodwin served four full terms in the North Carolina state House. Goodwin campaigned as the Democratic nominee for the position of North Carolina Commissioner of Labor in the 2004 election, losing in a close race to incumbent Republican Cherie Berry.

=== Insurance Commissioner ===
Goodwin served as the Assistant Commissioner of Insurance and Assistant State Fire Marshal for the State of North Carolina from 2005 through 2008. In 2008, Goodwin filed to run for Commissioner of Insurance after the surprise retirement of longtime Commissioner Jim Long. Goodwin defeated David Smith in the Democratic primary 56%–43% and went on to beat Republican John Odom and Libertarian Mark McMains with 51.57% of the vote. He was sworn in on January 10, 2009. Goodwin won re-election in the 2012 general contest by almost four percentage points.

=== NC Democratic Party Chair ===
Goodwin was a candidate for re-election to the position of Insurance Commissioner in 2016. After narrowly losing the general election, Goodwin announced that he would run for chairman of the North Carolina Democratic Party. With the support of 92% of ballots cast, he was elected to lead the state party on Feb. 11, 2017. Two years later, in January 2019, Goodwin won unanimous re-election to a second term as chairman of the North Carolina Democratic Party. After completing a second term, Goodwin chose not to seek a third after his wife died from cancer. First vice chair Bobbie Richardson succeeded Goodwin as party chair.

He unsuccessfully sought a third (non-consecutive) term as insurance commissioner in the 2020 election.

=== DMV Commissioner ===
In 2022, Goodwin was appointed commissioner of the North Carolina Division of Motor Vehicles. As commissioner, he lifted various restrictions for LGBT speech on vanity plates. Previously, vanity plates with LGBT content were not permitted by the Division. Under the direction of Goodwin, the DMV cracked down on racist and antisemitic vanity plates that had been approved due to creative spelling used to get around DMV restrictions.

Goodwin has also made several changes as commissioner to streamline DMV service. He has implemented extended walk-in hours and extended business hours at several DMV locations, as well as expanded online services. He has also announced the introduction of DMV self-service kiosks in places such as pharmacies and grocery stores, allowing DMV customers to renew their license and registration while shopping for groceries or picking up prescriptions.

In February 2025, Goodwin announced he would step down, and was succeeded by Paul Tine on May 6, 2025. During his time as commissioner, Goodwin filled over 400 DMV vacancies across the state and decreased wait times by an average of 27 minutes. In his departure, Goodwin cited a lack of cooperation from the North Carolina General Assembly in implementing some of his proposed improvements, such as opening new offices and hiring additional staff. He stated, “In addition to ongoing DMV modernization projects and online initiatives launched or expanded on my watch, NC needs a DMV workforce that more proportionally reflects the explosive population growth of our State. NC has had well over 2.4 million *new* residents over 20 years but only [netted] 3 new offices...I have shared this fact publicly time and time again while underscoring that DMV is an essential service.”

== Personal life ==
Goodwin was a Morehead Scholar and US Senate/William Randolph Hearst Scholar. He graduated from the University of North Carolina at Chapel Hill in political science and then went on to graduate from the UNC School of Law. While at UNC, he was a member of the Dialectic and Philanthropic Societies. He was married for 22 years to Melanie Wade Goodwin, also a former state legislator and attorney, until her death at age 50 in 2020. They are the parents of two children. On January 1, 2025 he and Lynne Marie Daack became engaged. After his being a widower for six years, joined by a throng of family members and friends they married outside of the historic Goodwin House, state headquarters of the North Carolina Democratic Party on August 8, 2026.

== Electoral history ==
North Carolina House of Representatives 32nd District Election, 1996
Party	Candidate	Votes	%
Democratic	Wayne Goodwin	12,104	100.00

North Carolina House of Representatives 32nd District Election, 1998
Party	Candidate	Votes	%
Democratic	Wayne Goodwin (inc.)	9,633	100.00

North Carolina House of Representatives 32nd District Election, 2000
Party	Candidate	Votes	%
Democratic	Wayne Goodwin (inc.)	13,417	100.00

North Carolina House of Representatives 68th District Election, 2002
Party	Candidate	Votes	%
Democratic	Wayne Goodwin (inc.)	10,393	55.86
Republican	George Crump, III	7,833	42.10
Libertarian	David Muse	381	2.05

North Carolina Commissioner of Labor Election, 2004
Party	Candidate	Votes	%
Republican	Cherie Berry (inc.)	1,723,004	52.09
Democratic	Wayne Goodwin	1,584,488	47.91

North Carolina Commissioner of Insurance Democratic primary election, 2008
Party	Candidate	Votes	%
Democratic	Wayne Goodwin	680,512	56.08
Democratic	David Smith	533,027	43.92

North Carolina Commissioner of Insurance Election, 2008
Party	Candidate	Votes	%
Democratic	Wayne Goodwin	2,106,870	51.57
Republican	John Odom	1,822,452	44.61
Libertarian	Mark McMains	153,517	3.76
Write-ins	Write-ins	2,358	0.06

North Carolina Commissioner of Insurance Election, 2012
Party	Candidate	Votes	%
Democratic	Wayne Goodwin (inc.)	2,226,344	51.86
Republican	Mike Causey	2,066,601	48.14

North Carolina House of Representatives
Preceded by Hugh Alfred Lee	Member of the North Carolina House of Representatives from the 32nd district 1997–2003	Succeeded by Jim Crawford
Preceded by Trudi Walend	Member of the North Carolina House of Representatives from the 68th district 2003–2005	Succeeded by Curtis Blackwood
Party political offices
Preceded by Doug Berger	Democratic nominee for Labor Commissioner of North Carolina; 2004	Succeeded by Mary Fant Donnan
Preceded by James E. Long	Democratic nominee for Insurance Commissioner of North Carolina; 2008, 2012, 2016, 2020	Succeeded by Natasha Marcus
Preceded by Patsy Keever	Chair of the North Carolina Democratic Party; 2017–2021	Succeeded by Bobbie Richardson
Political offices
Preceded by James Long	Insurance Commissioner of North Carolina; 2009–2017	Succeeded by Mike Causey
