= Luther H. Hodges =

American politician

Luther Hodges
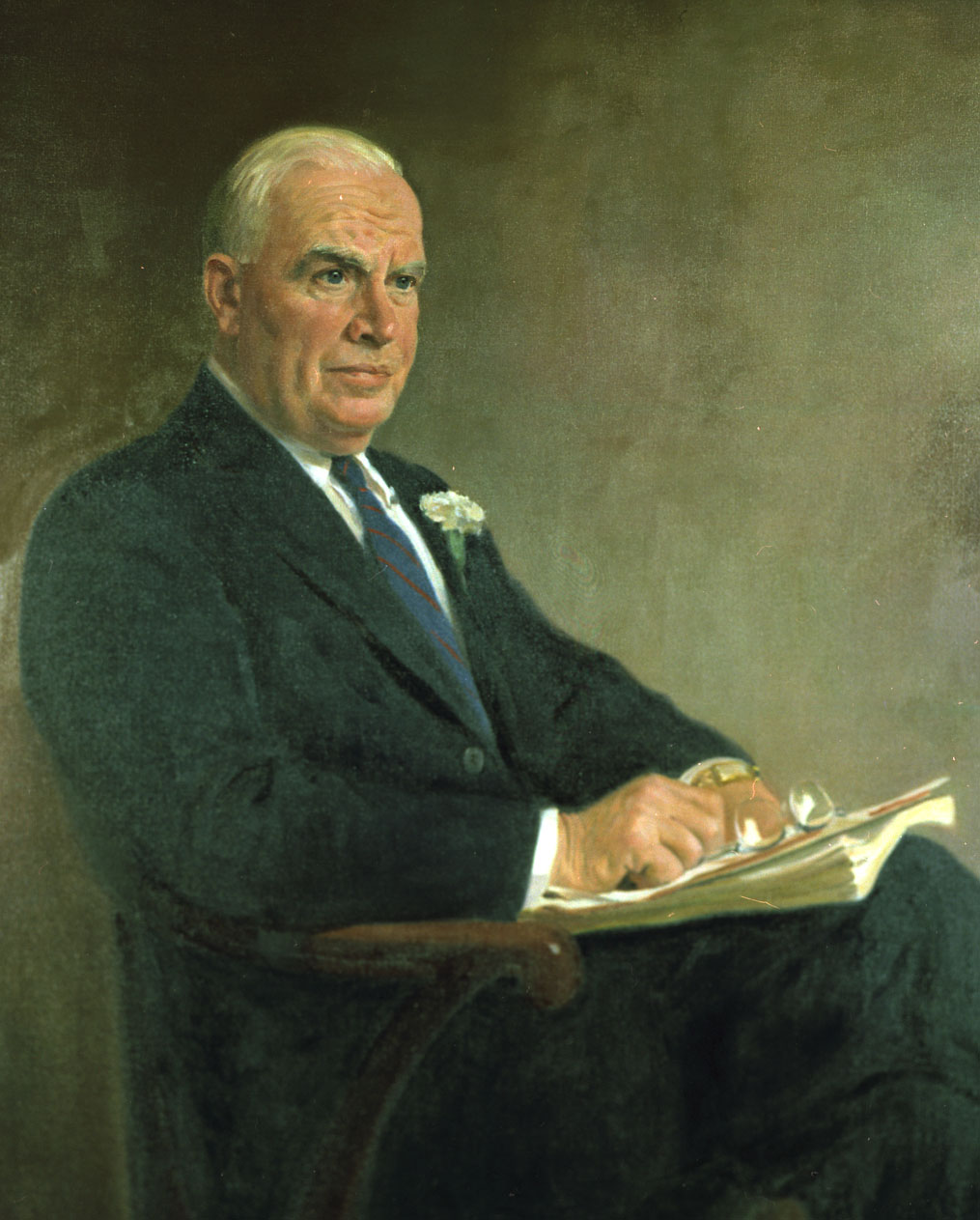

15th United States Secretary of Commerce
- In office January 21, 1961 – January 15, 1965
- President: John F. Kennedy; Lyndon B. Johnson
- Preceded by: Frederick H. Mueller
- Succeeded by: John T. Connor

64th Governor of North Carolina
- In office November 7, 1954 – January 5, 1961
- Lieutenant: Luther E. Barnhardt
- Preceded by: William B. Umstead
- Succeeded by: Terry Sanford

22nd Lieutenant Governor of North Carolina
- In office January 8, 1953 – November 7, 1954
- Governor: William B. Umstead
- Preceded by: Hoyt Patrick Taylor
- Succeeded by: Luther E. Barnhardt

Personal details
- Born: Luther Hartwell Hodges; March 9, 1898 Cascade, Virginia, U.S.
- Died: October 6, 1974 (aged 76) Chapel Hill, North Carolina, U.S.
- Party: Democratic
- Spouses: Martha Elizabeth Blakeney (m. 1922; died 1969) Louise Finlayson (m. 1970)
- Children: 3 (including Luther H. Hodges Jr.)
- Education: University of North Carolina, Chapel Hill (BA)

Military service
- Allegiance: United States
- Branch/service: United States Army
- Battles/wars: World War I

Luther Hartwell Hodges (March 9, 1898 – October 6, 1974) was an American businessman and politician. After a career in textile manufacturing, he entered public service, gaining some state appointments. Elected as lieutenant governor of North Carolina in 1952, he succeeded to the governor's office in 1954 after the death of the incumbent. He was elected in 1956 to a full four-year term, serving in total as the 64th governor of the state of North Carolina from 1954 to 1961.

== Biography ==
Hodges was born in Cascade, Pittsylvania County, Virginia, on March 9, 1898. At the age of two, he moved with his family to Spray (which later merged with two other towns to become Eden, North Carolina). After growing up there, he lived much of his life in Rockingham County, North Carolina.

Hodges left for the University of North Carolina at Chapel Hill at age 17, where he was a member of the Dialectic and Philanthropic Societies, and moved back to Eden after graduation. He went to work at Carolina Cotton and Woolen Mills in Leaksville. On June 24, 1922, he married Marthe Elizabeth Blakeney in Monroe, North Carolina. In 1923, he helped form the Leaksville Rotary Club, which later became known as the Eden Rotary.

Carolina Cotton was later purchased by Marshall Field. Hodges continued to work for the company, working his way up from millworker to executive positions, until he retired to enter politics. In the 1940s, he gained gubernatorial appointments to the state Board of Education and the Highway and Public Works Commission. In 1945, he served as a consultant to the U.S. Secretary of Agriculture and to the U.S. Army in occupied Germany. He retired in 1950 and returned to North Carolina.

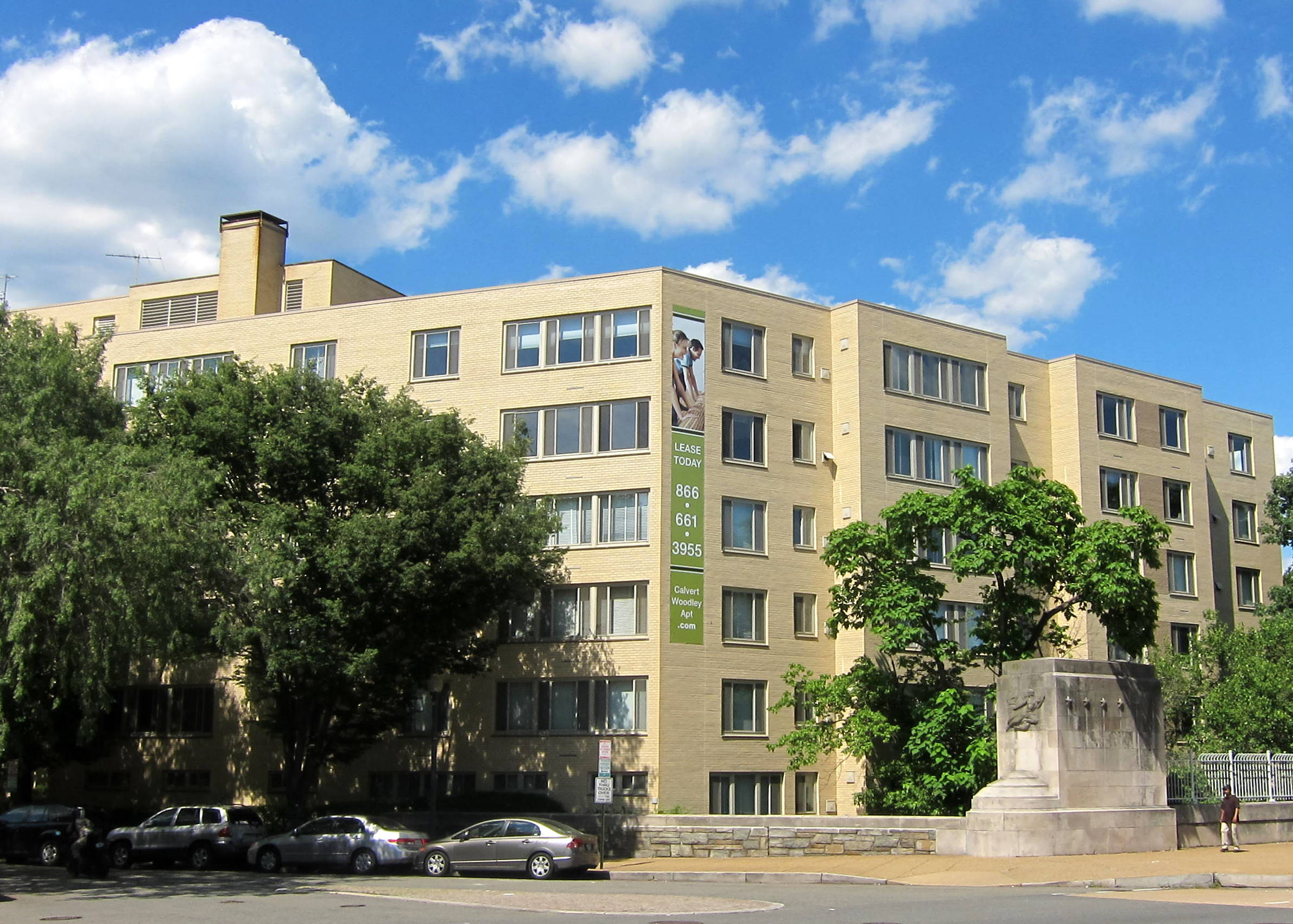
Hodges's former residence in Washington, D.C.

== Governor ==
Hodges ran for office as lieutenant governor as a Democrat in 1952 and was elected. He succeeded to the position of governor in November 1954 upon the death of Governor William B. Umstead in office. In 1956, Hodges was elected on his own account to a full four-year term as governor. Because North Carolina had a one-term limit for governors at that time, Hodges had the longest continuous tenure in the office until the state constitution was changed and Jim Hunt was elected to a second term in 1980.

During his time in office, Governor Hodges championed what he called "business progressivism." His modernization efforts included the new Department of Administration to streamline state government; industrial recruitment programs to diversify North Carolina's economy beyond agriculture and textiles; upgrading roads and utilities; and most important, creating the nationally famous Research Triangle Park in 1959, which linked advanced academic research and inventive young entrepreneurs.To promote better education, Hodges increased funding for public schools and raised teacher salaries. He expanded the state's community college system and encouraged the University of North Carolina system. However, Hodges faced resistance from rural conservatives who opposed increased state spending and federal involvement. Thanks to his business background and moderate approach on racial issues (he supported "separate but equal" rather than integration) he built coalitions across traditional political lines. For this work, Hodges is credited with leading North Carolina's dramatic transformation from one of the most impoverished states in the Union to one of its most prosperous.

=== Civil rights ===
In 1959, Hodges became involved in the Kissing Case, where two young African-American boys (one aged 9, and one aged 7) had been convicted of assault and molestation because a white girl (aged 8) had kissed them each on the cheek. They had been sentenced to the state reformatory. A range of activists, civil rights organizations, Eleanor Roosevelt and President Eisenhower, in addition to the international press, pressured Hodges for clemency. After three months Hodges pardoned them, but refused to apologize. Former First Lady Eleanor Roosevelt "led an international campaign on their behalf."

== Secretary of Commerce ==
In 1961 he was appointed as United States Secretary of Commerce under Presidents John F. Kennedy and Lyndon B. Johnson, serving until 1965.

== Later years ==
He returned to Chapel Hill, North Carolina and served as chairman of Research Triangle Park, a major facility established during his tenure as governor. In 1967, he served a one-year term as president of Rotary International.

He died on October 6, 1974, in Chapel Hill, North Carolina, and is buried at the Overlook Cemetery in Eden, North Carolina. A monument was erected in his honor near a water fountain in Eden's Freedom Park.

== Legacy ==
Hodges's son, Luther H. Hodges Jr., was a prominent banking executive and United States Deputy Secretary of Commerce.

== See also ==
- List of members of the American Legion

Political offices
Preceded by Hoyt Patrick Taylor	Lieutenant Governor of North Carolina; 1953–1954	Succeeded by Luther E. Barnhardt
Preceded by William B. Umstead	Governor of North Carolina; 1954–1961	Succeeded by Terry Sanford
Preceded by Frederick H. Mueller	United States Secretary of Commerce; 1961–1965	Succeeded by John T. Connor
Party political offices
Preceded by Hoyt Patrick Taylor	Democratic nominee for Lieutenant Governor of North Carolina; 1952	Succeeded by Luther E. Barnhardt
Preceded by William B. Umstead	Democratic nominee for Governor of North Carolina; 1956	Succeeded by Terry Sanford
Non-profit organization positions
Preceded by Richard L. Evans	President of Rotary International; 1967–1968	Succeeded by Kiyoshi Togasaki
