= John Ingram (politician) =

American politician (1929–2013)

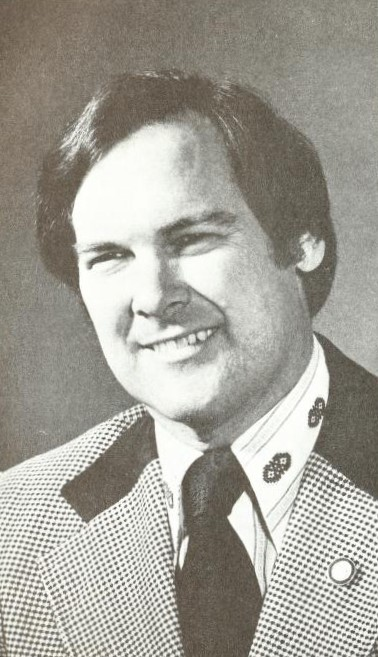
- Ingram in 1975

8th Insurance Commissioner of North Carolina
- In office January 10, 1973 – January 10, 1985
- Governor: James Holshouser; Jim Hunt
- Preceded by: Edwin S. Lanier
- Succeeded by: James E. Long

Member of the North Carolina House of Representatives from the 27th district
- In office 1971–1973 Serving with Colon Blake
- Preceded by: C. Roby Garner, Sr.
- Succeeded by: Thomas B. Hunter

Personal details
- Born: John Randolph Ingram; June 12, 1929 Greensboro, North Carolina, U.S.
- Died: January 6, 2013 (aged 83) Myrtle Beach, South Carolina, U.S.
- Party: Democratic
- Spouse: Virginia Brown (m. 1954)
- Children: Four
- Education: University of North Carolina, Chapel Hill (BS, JD)
- Profession: Attorney

Military service
- Allegiance: United States
- Branch/service: United States Army
- Unit: Judge Advocate Corps

John Randolph Ingram (June 12, 1929 – January 6, 2013) was an American Democratic politician, attorney, and insurance commissioner. He served as North Carolina's Commissioner of Insurance from 1973 until 1985.

== Biography ==
=== Early life ===
John Randolph Ingram was born on June 12, 1929, in Greensboro, North Carolina. He attended Asheboro High School. He graduated with a B.S. in Business Administration from the Kenan–Flagler Business School at the University of North Carolina in 1951. He earned his Juris Doctor from University of North Carolina School of Law in 1954.

=== Career ===
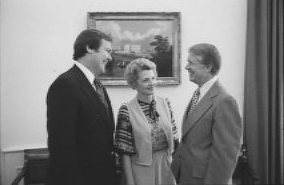
Ingram with President Jimmy Carter in 1978

He practiced as an attorney, serving on the board of directors of the North Carolina Bar Association. He served as a lawyer in the JAG Corps. After serving, he returned to North Carolina where he started his political career.

He first ran for election to represent Randolph County in the North Carolina House of Representatives in 1960, but lost. He ran for the state House again, winning in 1970, and served for one term, during which he introduced the bill reducing the voting age to 18 in North Carolina, and also advocated for auto insurance reform. He won his post as Commissioner of Insurance in 1972.

In that role, he was known as a populist and was an outspoken holder of the office. He won re-election in 1976 and 1980. He considered the abolition of assigned risk for young drivers to be the highlight of his career as Commissioner. Throughout his tenure, he consistently rejected insurance rate increases, although these were overturned by appellate courts in 32 of 33 cases. This brought him into conflict with the General Assembly, which, in 1977, stripped the Commissioner's office of its rate-capping powers.

He was indirectly threatened by the Insurance lobby which made many attempts to infiltrate his campaigns and cabinet. This led to the firing of aides and deputies, including successor Jim Long, and holding meetings in parking garages over fears his office was bugged.

He ran for the Democratic nomination for the United States Senate in 1978, 1986, and 1990. He won the Democratic nomination in the second ballot in the 1978 election against the banker Luther H. Hodges, Jr., who outspent him by $1.7m to only $50,000. In the general election, Ingram lost to the Republican incumbent Jesse Helms. He ran for the position of Governor of North Carolina in 1984, to replace Jim Hunt, whose term ended per constitutional term limits. However, in the primary election, Ingram finished fifth in a crowded field, with 9% of the vote.

In 1986, Terry Sanford won the nomination on the first ballot, with Ingram coming second, with 16% of the vote. Ingram came third in the 1990 primary, with 17%, behind Harvey Gantt and Mike Easley. In these later races, Ingram was known to focus primarily to issues of insurance. In the 1990 election, at first, Ingram refused to answer questions about any other topic, focusing on health insurance. However, he was known as pro-choice, and favoured federal funding of abortion for poor victims of rape and incest.

=== Death ===
He died on January 6, 2013, from complications of heart disease.

== Footnotes ==
Political offices
Preceded by Edwin S. Lanier	North Carolina Commissioner of Insurance; 1973–1985	Succeeded by James E. Long
Party political offices
Preceded by Edwin S. Lanier	Democratic nominee for North Carolina Commissioner of Insurance; 1972, 1976, 1980	Succeeded by James E. Long
Preceded by Nick Galifianakis	Democratic Party nominee for United States Senator from North Carolina (Class 2); 1978 (lost)	Succeeded by Jim Hunt
