= North Carolina Commissioner of Insurance =

Elected official in North Carolina, US

Commissioner of Insurance of North Carolina
- Seal of the North Carolina Department of Insurance

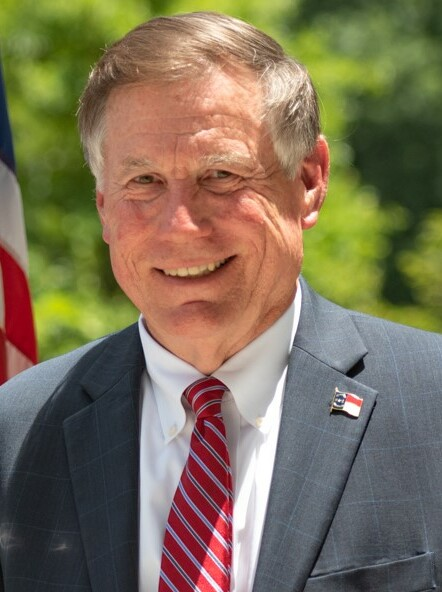
- Incumbent; Mike Causey since January 1, 2017
- Member of: Council of State
- Seat: Raleigh, North Carolina
- Term length: Four years
- Inaugural holder: James R. Young
- Formation: 1899
- Succession: Eleventh
- Salary: $168,384
- Website: www.ncdoi.gov

The commissioner of insurance is a statewide elected office in the U.S. state of North Carolina. The commissioner is a constitutional officer who leads the state's Department of Insurance and sits on the North Carolina Council of State. The current commissioner is Mike Causey, who has held that office since January 1, 2017.

== History of the office ==
Oversight of insurance in North Carolina was originally entrusted to the North Carolina Secretary of State. On March 6, 1899, the North Carolina General Assembly created the Department of Insurance. The first commissioner of insurance was to be appointed to two-year terms, though the legislature selected the first commissioner; the day the insurance department was created, the legislature elected James R. Young to the commissionership. That year a law was passed making the insurance commissioner ex officio the State Fire Marshal. In 1907 the legislature scheduled a referendum to amend the state constitution to provide for the popular election of the commissioner to four-year terms beginning in 1908, which was successful. Young, who had been continuously reappointed to the office, was elected to a full term. The commissionership was made a constitutional office in 1944. A 1968 constitutional study commission recommended making the governor responsible for the selection of the commissioner to reduce voters' burden by shortening the ballot, but this proposal was disregarded by the General Assembly when it revised the state constitution in 1971. Commissioner James E. Long created a full-fledged Office of the State Fire Marshal within the Department of Insurance on April 1, 1998. In November 2023, a bill was signed into law which split off the fire marshal's office into a separate agency, effective January 1, 2024. The incumbent commissioner, Mike Causey, was sworn in on January 1, 2017. He is the first Republican elected to the office.

== Powers, duties, and structure ==
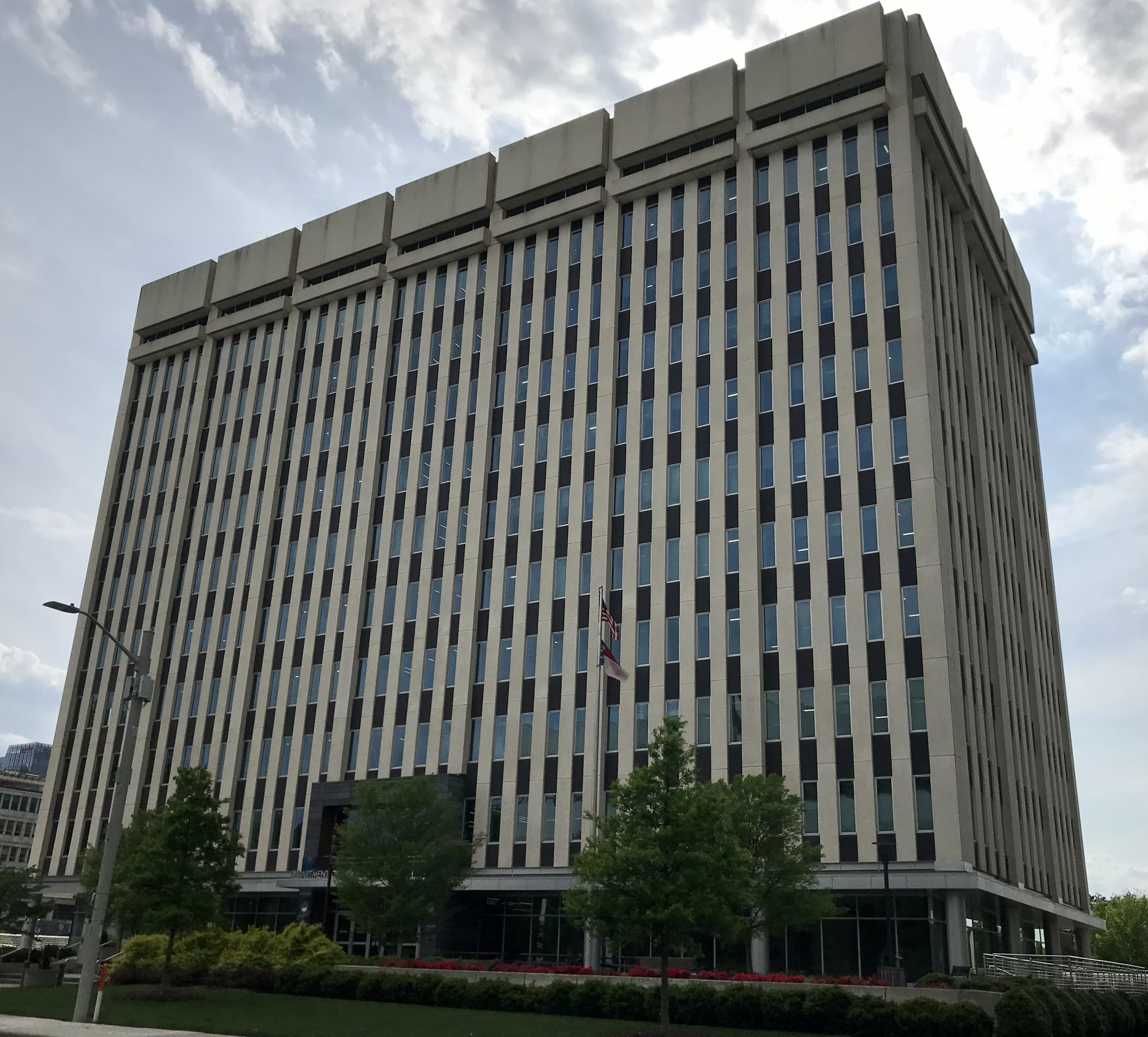
The Albemarle Building houses the North Carolina Department of Insurance

Article III, Section 7, of the Constitution of North Carolina stipulates the popular election of the commissioner of insurance every four years. The office holder is not subject to term limits. North Carolina is one of 11 states to have an elected insurance commissioner. In the event of a vacancy in the office, the Governor of North Carolina has the authority to appoint a successor until a candidate is elected at the next general election for members of the General Assembly. Per Article III, Section 8 of the constitution, the commissioner sits on the Council of State. They are eleventh in line of succession to the governor.

The commissioner of insurance leads the North Carolina Department of Insurance. The department regulates the sale of insurance in the state and licenses motor clubs premium financing firms, bail bondsmen, and collection agencies. The department has three groups: Public Services, which answers consumer queries and investigates insurance fraud; Company Services, which evaluates the financial condition of insurance companies and conducts actuarial studies; and Technical Services, which monitors rates and industry practices. As of December 2022, the department has 539 employees retained under the terms of the State Human Resources Act. As with all Council of State officers, the commissioner's salary is fixed by the General Assembly and cannot be reduced during their term of office. As of 2025, the commissioner's annual salary is $168,384. The Department of Insurance is housed in the Albemarle Building in downtown Raleigh.

== List of commissioners of insurance ==
Commissioners of insurance
No.	Commissioner	Term in office	Party	Source
1	James R. Young	1899 – 1921	Democratic	
2	Stacey W. Wade	1921 – 1927	Democratic	
3	Daniel C. Boney	1927 – 1942	Democratic	
4	William P. Hodges	1942 – 1949	Democratic	
5	Waldo C. Cheek	1949 – 1953	Democratic	
6	Charles F. Gold	1953 – 1962	Democratic	
7	Edwin S. Lanier	1962 – 1973	Democratic	
8	John R. Ingram	1973 – 1985	Democratic	
9	James E. Long	1985 – 2009	Democratic	
10	Wayne Goodwin	2009 – 2017	Democratic	
11	Mike Causey	2017 – present	Republican	

== Works cited ==
- Guillory, Ferrel (June 1988). "The Council of State and North Carolina's Long Ballot : A Tradition Hard to Change" (PDF). N.C. Insight. N.C. Center for Public Policy Research. pp. 40–44.
- North Carolina Manual (PDF). Raleigh: North Carolina Department of the Secretary of State. 2011. OCLC 2623953. Archived from the original (PDF) on 2023-08-02.
- Orth, John V.; Newby, Paul M. (2013). The North Carolina State Constitution (second ed.). Oxford University Press. ISBN 9780199300655.
