= 2024 North Carolina State Auditor election =

- November 5, 2024
- Turnout: 73.73%

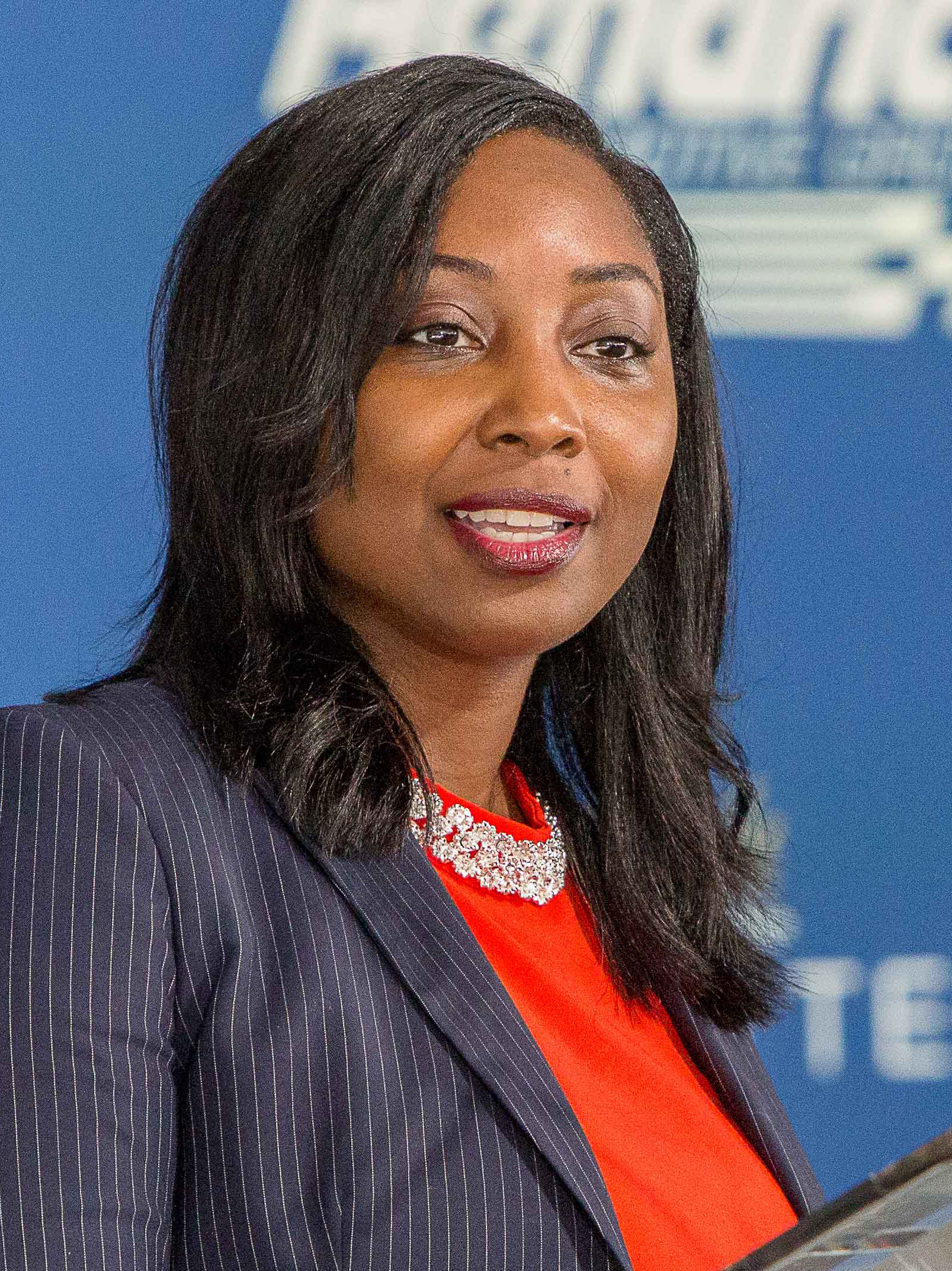
Candidate	Dave Boliek	Jessica Holmes
Party	Republican	Democratic
Popular vote	2,729,780	2,633,607
Percentage	49.35%	47.62%
- Boliek: 40–50% 50–60% 60–70% 70–80% Holmes: 40–50% 50–60% 60–70% 70–80%
State Auditor before election
Jessica Holmes
Democratic
Elected State Auditor
Dave Boliek
Republican

The 2024 North Carolina State Auditor election was held on November 5, 2024, to elect the North Carolina State Auditor, concurrently with the 2024 presidential election, as well as elections to the U.S. House of Representatives, governor, the Council of State, and other state, local, and judicial elections.

Incumbent Democratic state auditor Beth Wood resigned on December 15, 2023, following a misdemeanor indictment on improper use of state-owned vehicles and a hit and run conviction months earlier. Governor Roy Cooper appointed former Wake County Board of Commissioners member Jessica Holmes to serve as state auditor for the remainder of Wood's term, becoming the first Black woman to serve any position in the Council of State.

Holmes ran for election to full term in office, but lost to UNC Board of Trustees member Dave Boliek. Notably, Wood, the previous Democratic auditor before Holmes was appointed, cross-endorsed Boliek.

== Democratic primary ==
Appointed state auditor Jessica Holmes did not face a primary challenger, and automatically became the Democratic nominee.

=== Candidates ===
==== Nominee ====
- Jessica Holmes, incumbent state auditor (2023–present)

==== Withdrew before primary ====
- Luis Toledo, candidate for state auditor in 2020
- Beth Wood, former state auditor (2009–2023)

=== Results ===
Democratic primary results
Party	Candidate	Votes	%
Democratic	Jessica Holmes (incumbent)	Unopposed	
Total votes		—N/a	100.0

== Republican primary ==
=== Candidates ===
==== Nominee ====
- Dave Boliek, member of the University of North Carolina at Chapel Hill Board of Trustees

==== Eliminated in primary runoff ====
- Jack Clark, state legislative accountant

==== Eliminated in primary ====
- Charles Dingee, business owner
- Jim Kee, economics major
- Anthony Wayne Street, business owner and nominee for state auditor in 2020
- Jeff Tarte, state senator from the 41st district (2013–2019)

==== Withdrew before primary ====
- James Upchurch, former member of the Guilford County Board of Commissioners

=== Results ===
Primary results by county Clark: 20–30%; 30–40%; Boliek: 20–30%; 30–40%; 40–50%; Dingee: 20–30%; 30–40%; Tarte: 20–30%; Street: 20–30%; Kee: 20–30%

Runoff results by county Boliek: 50–60%; 60–70%; 70–80%; Clark: 50–60%; 60–70%

Republican primary results
Party	Candidate	Votes	%
Republican	Jack Clark	198,793	23.24%
Republican	Dave Boliek	189,071	22.10%
Republican	Charles Dingee	159,351	18.63%
Republican	Jeff Tarte	127,981	14.96%
Republican	Anthony Wayne Street	95,863	11.21%
Republican	Jim Kee	84,302	9.86%
Total votes		855,361	100.00%
Runoff election
Republican	Dave Boliek	67,173	53.18%
Republican	Jack Clark	59,130	46.82%
Total votes		126,303	100.00%

== General election ==
=== Endorsements ===
Jessica Holmes (D)

Statewide officials

- Roy Cooper, incumbent governor of North Carolina (2017–2025) and former North Carolina Attorney General (2001–2017)
Dave Boliek (R)

Executive branch officials

- Donald Trump, 45th president of the United States (2017–2021) and Republican nominee for president in 2024

Statewide officials

- Beth Wood, former state auditor (2009–2023) (Democratic)

Newspapers and other media

- The Charlotte Observer
- The News & Observer

=== Polling ===
Poll source	Date(s) administered	Sample size (Note: Key: A – all adults RV – registered voters LV – likely voters V – unclear)	Margin of error	Jessica Holmes (D)	Dave Boliek (R)	Bob Drach (L)	Undecided
Cygnal (R) (Note: Poll sponsored by The Carolina Journal)	October 12–14, 2024	600 (LV)	± 3.99%	40.1%	40.4%	3%	16%
ActiVote	August 20 – September 22, 2024	400 (LV)	± 4.9%	51%	49%	–	–
Cygnal (R)	September 15–16, 2024	600 (LV)	± 3.99%	38%	39%	3%	20%
YouGov (D)	August 5–9, 2024	802 (RV)	± 3.9%	41%	37%	–	22%
Cygnal (R)	August 4–5, 2024	600 (LV)	± 3.99%	35%	36%	4%	26%

=== Results ===
2024 North Carolina State Auditor election
Party	Candidate	Votes	%
Republican	Dave Boliek	2,729,780	49.35%
Democratic	Jessica Holmes (incumbent)	2,633,607	47.62%
Libertarian	Bob Drach	167,701	3.03%
Total votes		5,531,088	100.00%
Republican gain from Democratic			

Counties that flipped from Democratic to Republican

- Lenoir (largest city: Kinston)
- Martin (largest city: Williamston)
- Granville (largest city: Oxford)
- Pasquotank (largest city: Elizabeth City)
- Scotland (largest city: Laurinburg)

==== By congressional district ====
Boliek won 11 of 14 congressional districts, including one that elected a Democrat.

District	Holmes	Boliek	Representative
1st	48.7%	49.2%	Don Davis
2nd	65%	32%	Deborah Ross
3rd	39%	58%	Greg Murphy
4th	71%	26%	Valerie Foushee
5th	41%	56%	Virginia Foxx
6th	41%	56%	Addison McDowell
7th	42%	55%	David Rouzer
8th	40%	57%	Mark Harris
9th	41%	56%	Richard Hudson
10th	40%	57%	Pat Harrigan
11th	45%	52%	Chuck Edwards
12th	71%	25%	Alma Adams
13th	41%	56%	Brad Knott
14th	42%	55%	Tim Moore

== Notes ==
Partisan clients
