= 2004 North Carolina State Auditor election =

- November 2, 2004
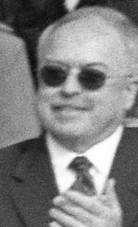

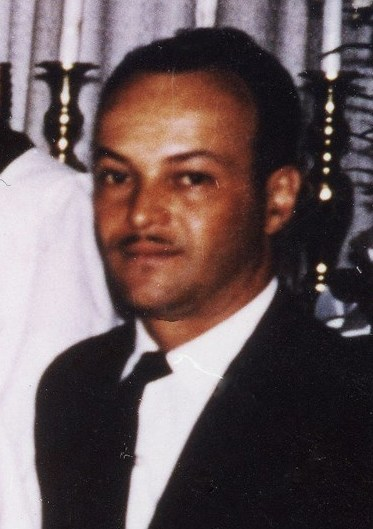
Nominee	Les Merritt	Ralph Campbell Jr.
Party	Republican	Democratic
Popular vote	1,662,354	1,633,639
Percentage	50.44%	49.56%
- County results Merritt: 50–60% 60–70% 70–80% Campbell: 50–60% 60–70% 70–80%
State Auditor before election
Ralph Campbell Jr.
Democratic
Elected State Auditor
Les Merritt
Republican

The 2004 North Carolina State Auditor election was held on November 2, 2004, to elect the North Carolina State Auditor, concurrently with the 2004 U.S. presidential election, as well as elections to the United States Senate, U.S. House of Representatives, governor, the Council of State, and other state, local and judicial elections. Primary elections were held on July 20.

Incumbent Democratic state auditor Ralph Campbell Jr. ran for re-election to a fourth term in office, but lost to Republican candidate Les Merritt in a rematch of the 2000 election for the same office. Campbell conceded the race on November 10, and later alleged a factor in him losing re-election was because he was African-American. Following this election, Merritt became the first elected Republican state auditor in North Carolina history.

== Democratic primary ==
=== Candidates ===
==== Nominee ====
- Ralph Campbell Jr., incumbent state auditor (1993–present)

=== Results ===
Democratic primary results
Party	Candidate	Votes	%
Democratic	Ralph Campbell Jr. (incumbent)	Unopposed	
Total votes		—N/a	100.0

== Republican primary ==
=== Candidates ===
==== Nominee ====
- Les Merritt, former member of the Wake County Board of Commissioners (1994–1998) and nominee for state auditor in 2000

==== Eliminated in primary ====
- Jasper Albright

=== Results ===
Republican primary results by county Merritt: 50–60%; 60–70%; 70–80%

Republican primary results
Party	Candidate	Votes	%
Republican	Les Merritt	190,408	66.83
Republican	Jasper Albright	94,512	33.17
Total votes		284,920	100.0

== General election ==
=== Polling ===
Poll source	Date(s) administered	Sample size (Note: Key: A – all adults RV – registered voters LV – likely voters V – unclear)	Margin of error	Ralph Campbell Jr. (D)	Les Merritt (R)	Undecided
Tel Opinion Research/John Locke Foundation	October 18–20, 2004	600 (LV)	± 4.0%	38%	27%	35%

=== Results ===
2004 North Carolina State Auditor election
Party	Candidate	Votes	%
Republican	Les Merritt	1,662,354	50.44
Democratic	Ralph Campbell Jr. (incumbent)	1,633,639	49.56
Total votes		3,295,993	100.0
Republican gain from Democratic			
