= North Carolina's 2nd congressional district =

U.S. House district for North Carolina

Coordinates: 35.87°N 78.60°W

- Interactive map of district boundaries since January 3, 2025 (Note: As the mid-decade redistricting bill (S249) enacted on October 22, 2025 only changed the compositions of North Carolina's 1st and 3rd congressional districts, boundaries of other districts will not change at the 2026 elections.)
- Representative: Deborah Ross; D–Raleigh
- Population (2025): 799,966
- Median household income: $94,388
- Ethnicity: 53.7% White; 22.7% Black; 12.9% Hispanic; 5.8% Asian; 4.0% Two or more races; 0.9% other
- Cook PVI: D+17

North Carolina's 2nd congressional district is located in the central part of the state. The district contains most of Wake County. Prior to court-mandated redistricting in 2019, it also included northern Johnston County, southern Nash County, far western Wilson County, and all of Franklin and Harnett counties. The 2nd district has been represented by Democratic Rep. Deborah Ross since 2021. It is the wealthiest congressional district in North Carolina and the 49th wealthiest in the United States, with 21.6 percent of households earning over $200,000, per a 2024 study.

Established by the state legislature after the American Civil War, the district was known as "The Black Second;" counties included in the district were mostly majority-Black in population. All four of North Carolina's Republican African-American congressmen elected in the post-Civil War era (ending with George Henry White) represented this district, as did white yeoman farmer Curtis Hooks Brogden of Wayne County, a Republican ally of former Governor William Woods Holden.

After North Carolina Democrats regained control of the state legislature in the 1870s (using intimidation by the Red Shirts and other paramilitary groups to reduce the number of African Americans voting), they passed voter registration and electoral laws that restricted voter rolls. Black Americans continued getting elected into local and state level offices. The state legislature passed a new constitutional amendment in 1900, which effectively disfranchised blacks altogether. This ended the election of Black Americans to local, state or Congressional offices until after the passage of federal civil rights legislation in the mid-1960s, which enforced constitutional voting rights.

Thousands of Black Americans migrated north from the state in the Great Migration during the first half of the twentieth century, seeking job opportunities and education. By the later twentieth century, before the 1990s, the 2nd district was roughly 40% black. While it had the highest percentage of Black residents of any congressional district in North Carolina, African-American candidates were unable to get elected to Congress from the majority-white district.

State redistricting following census changes led to the creation of the black-majority 1st and 12th districts and drew off some of the Black population from the 2nd. Today the proportion of African-American residents is about 20.11% in the 2nd district.

In 2019, court-mandated redistricting shifted the district entirely into urban Wake County. Incumbent Republican representative George Holding declined to run for re-election in 2020, and Democratic Rep. Deborah Ross won election to the seat.

On February 23, 2022, the North Carolina Supreme Court approved a new map which changed the 2nd district boundaries to include northern Wake County while moving much of what had been the 2nd district to the 13th district.

Wake County is the sole county in the district.

== Counties and communities ==
For the 119th and successive Congresses (based on the districts drawn following a 2023 legislative session), the district contains all or portions of the following counties and communities.

Wake County (10)

Cary (part; also 4th, 9th, and 13th; shared with Chatham and Durham counties), Durham (part; also 4th; shared with Durham and Orange counties), Garner (part; also 13th), Knightdale, Morrisville (part; also 4th; shared with Durham County), Raleigh (part; also 4th and 13th; shared with Durham County), Rolesville (part; also 13th), Wake Forest (part; also 13th; shared with Franklin County), Wendell (part; also 13th), Zebulon (part; also 13th)

== Recent election results from statewide races ==
Year	Office	Results
2008	President	Obama 61% - 38%
2008	Senate	Hagan 60% - 37%
2008	Governor	Perdue 55% - 41%
2010	Senate	Marshall 53% - 45%
2012	President	Obama 61% - 39%
2012	Governor	Dalton 53% - 44%
2014	Senate	Hagan 60% - 37%
2016	President	Clinton 62% - 33%
2016	Senate	Ross 60% - 37%
2016	Governor	Cooper 65% - 33%
2016	Lt. Governor	Coleman 59% - 37%
2016	Secretary of State	Marshall 66% - 34%
2016	Auditor	Wood 63% - 37%
2016	Treasurer	Blue III 61% - 39%
2016	Attorney General	Stein 65% - 35%
2020	President	Biden 67% - 31%
2020	Senate	Cunningham 63% - 33%
2020	Governor	Cooper 69% - 29%
2020	Lt. Governor	Lewis Holley 66% - 34%
2020	Secretary of State	Marshall 69% - 31%
2020	Auditor	Wood 69% - 31%
2020	Treasurer	Chatterji 63% - 37%
2020	Attorney General	Stein 68% - 32%
2022	Senate	Beasley 66% - 31%
2024	President	Harris 66% - 32%
2024	Governor	Stein 73% - 21%
2024	Lt. Governor	Hunt 67% - 30%
2024	Secretary of State	Marshall 70% - 30%
2024	Auditor	Holmes 65% - 32%
2024	Treasurer	Harris 64% - 36%
2024	Attorney General	Jackson 69% - 31%

== List of members representing the district ==
Member (Residence)	Party	Years	Cong ress	Electoral history	District location
District established March 19, 1790
Hugh Williamson (Edenton)	Anti-Administration	March 19, 1790 – March 3, 1791	1st	Elected in 1790. Redistricted to the 4th district.	1790–1791 "Edenton and New Bern division"
Nathaniel Macon (Warrenton)	Anti-Administration	March 4, 1791 – March 3, 1793	2nd	Elected in 1791. Redistricted to the 5th district.	1791–1793 "Centre division"
Matthew Locke (Rowan County)	Anti-Administration	March 4, 1793 – March 3, 1795	3rd 4th 5th	Elected in 1793. Re-elected in 1795. Re-elected in 1796. Lost re-election.	1793–1803 [data missing]
Matthew Locke (Rowan County)	Democratic-Republican	March 4, 1795 – March 3, 1799	3rd 4th 5th	Elected in 1793. Re-elected in 1795. Re-elected in 1796. Lost re-election.	1793–1803 [data missing]
Archibald Henderson (Salisbury)	Federalist	March 4, 1799 – March 3, 1803	6th 7th	Elected in 1798. Re-elected in 1800. Redistricted to the 12th district.	1793–1803 [data missing]
Willis Alston (Greenville)	Democratic-Republican	March 4, 1803 – March 3, 1815	8th 9th 10th 11th 12th 13th	Redistricted from the 9th district and re-elected in 1803. Re-elected in 1804. Re-elected in 1806. Re-elected in 1808. Re-elected in 1810. Re-elected in 1813. Retired.	1803–1813 "North Carolina congressional district map (1803–13)".
Willis Alston (Greenville)	Democratic-Republican	March 4, 1803 – March 3, 1815	8th 9th 10th 11th 12th 13th	Redistricted from the 9th district and re-elected in 1803. Re-elected in 1804. Re-elected in 1806. Re-elected in 1808. Re-elected in 1810. Re-elected in 1813. Retired.	1813–1823 "North Carolina congressional district map (1813–43)".
Joseph Hunter Bryan (Windsor)	Democratic-Republican	March 4, 1815 – March 3, 1819	14th 15th	Elected in 1815. Re-elected in 1817. [data missing]	1813–1823 "North Carolina congressional district map (1813–43)".
Hutchins G. Burton (Halifax)	Democratic-Republican	March 4, 1819 – March 3, 1823	16th 17th 18th	Elected in 1819. Re-elected in 1821. Resigned when elected Governor of North Carolina.	1813–1823 "North Carolina congressional district map (1813–43)".
Hutchins G. Burton (Halifax)	Democratic-Republican	March 4, 1823 – March 23, 1824	16th 17th 18th	Elected in 1819. Re-elected in 1821. Resigned when elected Governor of North Carolina.	1823–1833 "North Carolina congressional district map (1813–43)".
Vacant		March 24, 1824 – January 18, 1825	18th		1823–1833 "North Carolina congressional district map (1813–43)".
George Outlaw (Windsor)	Democratic-Republican	January 19, 1825 – March 3, 1825	18th	Elected January 6, 1825 to finish Burton's term and seated January 19, 1825. Lost re-election.	1823–1833 "North Carolina congressional district map (1813–43)".
Willis Alston (Hyde Park)	Jacksonian	March 4, 1825 – March 3, 1831	19th 20th 21st	Elected in 1825. Re-elected in 1827. Re-elected in 1829. Retired.	1823–1833 "North Carolina congressional district map (1813–43)".
Vacant		March 4, 1831 – May 12, 1831	22nd		1823–1833 "North Carolina congressional district map (1813–43)".
John Branch (Enfield)	Jacksonian	May 12, 1831 – March 3, 1833	22nd	Elected to finish the vacant term. Retired.	1823–1833 "North Carolina congressional district map (1813–43)".
Jesse A. Bynum (Halifax)	Jacksonian	March 4, 1833 – March 3, 1837	23rd 24th 25th 26th	Elected in 1833. Re-elected in 1835. Re-elected in 1837. Re-elected in 1839. [data missing]	1833–1843 "North Carolina congressional district map (1813–43)".
Jesse A. Bynum (Halifax)	Democratic	March 4, 1837 – March 3, 1841	23rd 24th 25th 26th	Elected in 1833. Re-elected in 1835. Re-elected in 1837. Re-elected in 1839. [data missing]	1833–1843 "North Carolina congressional district map (1813–43)".
John Daniel (Halifax)	Democratic	March 4, 1841 – March 3, 1843	27th	Elected in 1841. Redistricted to the 7th district.	1833–1843 "North Carolina congressional district map (1813–43)".
Daniel M. Barringer (Concord)	Whig	March 4, 1843 – March 3, 1847	28th 29th	Elected in 1843. Re-elected in 1845. Redistricted to the 3rd district.	1843–1853 [data missing]
Nathaniel Boyden (Salisbury)	Whig	March 4, 1847 – March 3, 1849	30th	Elected in 1847. Retired.	1843–1853 [data missing]
Joseph P. Caldwell (Statesville)	Whig	March 4, 1849 – March 3, 1853	31st 32nd	Elected in 1849. Re-elected in 1851. Retired.	1843–1853 [data missing]
Thomas H. Ruffin (Goldsboro)	Democratic	March 4, 1853 – March 3, 1861	33rd 34th 35th 36th	Elected in 1853. Re-elected in 1855. Re-elected in 1857. Re-elected in 1859. [data missing]	1853–1861 [data missing]
Vacant		March 3, 1861 – July 25, 1868	37th 38th 39th 40th	Civil War and Reconstruction	
David Heaton (New Bern)	Republican	July 25, 1868 – June 25, 1870	40th 41st	Elected to finish the short term. Re-elected in 1868. Died.	1868–1873 [data missing]
Vacant		June 26, 1870 – December 4, 1870	41st		1868–1873 [data missing]
Joseph Dixon (Hookerton)	Republican	December 5, 1870 – March 3, 1871	41st	Elected to finish Heaton's term. Retired.	1868–1873 [data missing]
Charles Thomas (New Bern)	Republican	March 4, 1871 – March 3, 1875	42nd 43rd	Elected in 1870. Re-elected in 1872. Lost renomination.	1868–1873 [data missing]
Charles Thomas (New Bern)	Republican	March 4, 1871 – March 3, 1875	42nd 43rd	Elected in 1870. Re-elected in 1872. Lost renomination.	1873–1883 [data missing]
John A. Hyman (Warrenton)	Republican	March 4, 1875 – March 3, 1877	44th	Elected in 1874. Lost renomination to immediate past governor.	1873–1883 [data missing]
Curtis H. Brogden (Goldsboro)	Republican	March 4, 1877 – March 3, 1879	45th	Elected in 1876. Retired.	1873–1883 [data missing]
William H. Kitchin (Scotland Neck)	Democratic	March 4, 1879 – March 3, 1881	46th	Elected in 1878. Lost re-election.	1873–1883 [data missing]
Orlando Hubbs (New Bern)	Republican	March 4, 1881 – March 3, 1883	47th	Elected in 1880. Retired.	1873–1883 [data missing]
James E. O'Hara (Enfield)	Republican	March 4, 1883 – March 3, 1887	48th 49th	Elected in 1882. Re-elected in 1884. Lost re-election.	1883–1893 [data missing]
Furnifold M. Simmons (New Bern)	Democratic	March 4, 1887 – March 3, 1889	50th	Elected in 1886. Lost re-election.	1883–1893 [data missing]
Henry P. Cheatham (Littleton)	Republican	March 4, 1889 – March 3, 1893	51st 52nd	Elected in 1888. Re-elected in 1890. Lost re-election.	1883–1893 [data missing]
Frederick A. Woodard (Wilson)	Democratic	March 4, 1893 – March 3, 1897	53rd 54th	Elected in 1892. Re-elected in 1894. Lost re-election.	1893–1903 [data missing]
George H. White (Tarboro)	Republican	March 4, 1897 – March 3, 1901	55th 56th	Elected in 1896. Re-elected in 1898. Retired after state passage of the 1900 disfranchisement constitution.	1893–1903 [data missing]
Claude Kitchin (Scotland Neck)	Democratic	March 4, 1901 – May 31, 1923	57th 58th 59th 60th 61st 62nd 63rd 64th 65th 66th 67th 68th	Elected in 1900. Re-elected in 1902. Re-elected in 1904. Re-elected in 1906. Re-elected in 1908. Re-elected in 1910. Re-elected in 1912. Re-elected in 1914. Re-elected in 1916. Re-elected in 1918. Re-elected in 1920. Re-elected in 1922. Died.	1893–1903 [data missing]
Claude Kitchin (Scotland Neck)	Democratic	March 4, 1901 – May 31, 1923	57th 58th 59th 60th 61st 62nd 63rd 64th 65th 66th 67th 68th	Elected in 1900. Re-elected in 1902. Re-elected in 1904. Re-elected in 1906. Re-elected in 1908. Re-elected in 1910. Re-elected in 1912. Re-elected in 1914. Re-elected in 1916. Re-elected in 1918. Re-elected in 1920. Re-elected in 1922. Died.	1903–1913 [data missing]
Claude Kitchin (Scotland Neck)	Democratic	March 4, 1901 – May 31, 1923	57th 58th 59th 60th 61st 62nd 63rd 64th 65th 66th 67th 68th	Elected in 1900. Re-elected in 1902. Re-elected in 1904. Re-elected in 1906. Re-elected in 1908. Re-elected in 1910. Re-elected in 1912. Re-elected in 1914. Re-elected in 1916. Re-elected in 1918. Re-elected in 1920. Re-elected in 1922. Died.	1913–1933 [data missing]
Vacant		May 31, 1923 – November 5, 1923	68th		1913–1933 [data missing]
John H. Kerr (Warrenton)	Democratic	November 6, 1923 – January 3, 1953	68th 69th 70th 71st 72nd 73rd 74th 75th 76th 77th 78th 79th 80th 81st 82nd	Elected to finish Kitchin's term. Re-elected in 1924. Re-elected in 1926. Re-elected in 1928. Re-elected in 1930. Re-elected in 1932. Re-elected in 1934. Re-elected in 1936. Re-elected in 1938. Re-elected in 1940. Re-elected in 1942. Re-elected in 1944. Re-elected in 1946. Re-elected in 1948. Re-elected in 1950. Lost renomination.	1913–1933 [data missing]
John H. Kerr (Warrenton)	Democratic	November 6, 1923 – January 3, 1953	68th 69th 70th 71st 72nd 73rd 74th 75th 76th 77th 78th 79th 80th 81st 82nd	Elected to finish Kitchin's term. Re-elected in 1924. Re-elected in 1926. Re-elected in 1928. Re-elected in 1930. Re-elected in 1932. Re-elected in 1934. Re-elected in 1936. Re-elected in 1938. Re-elected in 1940. Re-elected in 1942. Re-elected in 1944. Re-elected in 1946. Re-elected in 1948. Re-elected in 1950. Lost renomination.	1933–1943 [data missing]
John H. Kerr (Warrenton)	Democratic	November 6, 1923 – January 3, 1953	68th 69th 70th 71st 72nd 73rd 74th 75th 76th 77th 78th 79th 80th 81st 82nd	Elected to finish Kitchin's term. Re-elected in 1924. Re-elected in 1926. Re-elected in 1928. Re-elected in 1930. Re-elected in 1932. Re-elected in 1934. Re-elected in 1936. Re-elected in 1938. Re-elected in 1940. Re-elected in 1942. Re-elected in 1944. Re-elected in 1946. Re-elected in 1948. Re-elected in 1950. Lost renomination.	1943–1953 [data missing]
L. H. Fountain (Tarboro)	Democratic	January 3, 1953 – January 3, 1983	83rd 84th 85th 86th 87th 88th 89th 90th 91st 92nd 93rd 94th 95th 96th 97th	Elected in 1952. Re-elected in 1954. Re-elected in 1956. Re-elected in 1958. Re-elected in 1960. Re-elected in 1962. Re-elected in 1964. Re-elected in 1966. Re-elected in 1968. Re-elected in 1970. Re-elected in 1972. Re-elected in 1974. Re-elected in 1976. Re-elected in 1978. Re-elected in 1980. Retired.	1953–1963 [data missing]
L. H. Fountain (Tarboro)	Democratic	January 3, 1953 – January 3, 1983	83rd 84th 85th 86th 87th 88th 89th 90th 91st 92nd 93rd 94th 95th 96th 97th	Elected in 1952. Re-elected in 1954. Re-elected in 1956. Re-elected in 1958. Re-elected in 1960. Re-elected in 1962. Re-elected in 1964. Re-elected in 1966. Re-elected in 1968. Re-elected in 1970. Re-elected in 1972. Re-elected in 1974. Re-elected in 1976. Re-elected in 1978. Re-elected in 1980. Retired.	1963–1973 [data missing]
L. H. Fountain (Tarboro)	Democratic	January 3, 1953 – January 3, 1983	83rd 84th 85th 86th 87th 88th 89th 90th 91st 92nd 93rd 94th 95th 96th 97th	Elected in 1952. Re-elected in 1954. Re-elected in 1956. Re-elected in 1958. Re-elected in 1960. Re-elected in 1962. Re-elected in 1964. Re-elected in 1966. Re-elected in 1968. Re-elected in 1970. Re-elected in 1972. Re-elected in 1974. Re-elected in 1976. Re-elected in 1978. Re-elected in 1980. Retired.	1973–1983 [data missing]
Tim Valentine (Nashville)	Democratic	January 3, 1983 – January 3, 1995	98th 99th 100th 101st 102nd 103rd	Elected in 1982. Re-elected in 1984. Re-elected in 1986. Re-elected in 1988. Re-elected in 1990. Re-elected in 1992. Retired.	1983–1993 [data missing]
Tim Valentine (Nashville)	Democratic	January 3, 1983 – January 3, 1995	98th 99th 100th 101st 102nd 103rd	Elected in 1982. Re-elected in 1984. Re-elected in 1986. Re-elected in 1988. Re-elected in 1990. Re-elected in 1992. Retired.	1993–2003 [data missing]
David Funderburk (Buies Creek)	Republican	January 3, 1995 – January 3, 1997	104th	Elected in 1994. Lost re-election.	1993–2003 [data missing]
Bob Etheridge (Lillington)	Democratic	January 3, 1997 – January 3, 2011	105th 106th 107th 108th 109th 110th 111th	Elected in 1996. Re-elected in 1998. Re-elected in 2000. Re-elected in 2002. Re-elected in 2004. Re-elected in 2006. Re-elected in 2008. Lost re-election.	1993–2003 [data missing]
Bob Etheridge (Lillington)	Democratic	January 3, 1997 – January 3, 2011	105th 106th 107th 108th 109th 110th 111th	Elected in 1996. Re-elected in 1998. Re-elected in 2000. Re-elected in 2002. Re-elected in 2004. Re-elected in 2006. Re-elected in 2008. Lost re-election.	2003–2013
Renee Ellmers (Dunn)	Republican	January 3, 2011 – January 3, 2017	112th 113th 114th	Elected in 2010. Re-elected in 2012. Re-elected in 2014. Lost renomination.	2003–2013
Renee Ellmers (Dunn)	Republican	January 3, 2011 – January 3, 2017	112th 113th 114th	Elected in 2010. Re-elected in 2012. Re-elected in 2014. Lost renomination.	2013–2017
George Holding (Raleigh)	Republican	January 3, 2017 – January 3, 2021	115th 116th	Redistricted from the 13th district and re-elected in 2016. Re-elected in 2018. Retired.	2017–2021
Deborah Ross (Raleigh)	Democratic	January 3, 2021 – present	117th 118th 119th	Elected in 2020. Re-elected in 2022. Re-elected in 2024. Re-elected in 2026.	2021–2023
Deborah Ross (Raleigh)	Democratic	January 3, 2021 – present	117th 118th 119th	Elected in 2020. Re-elected in 2022. Re-elected in 2024. Re-elected in 2026.	2023–2025
Deborah Ross (Raleigh)	Democratic	January 3, 2021 – present	117th 118th 119th	Elected in 2020. Re-elected in 2022. Re-elected in 2024. Re-elected in 2026.	2025–present

== Past election results ==
=== 2000 ===
2000 North Carolina's 2nd congressional district election
Party	Candidate	Votes	%
Democratic	Bob Etheridge (incumbent)	146,733	58.3
Republican	Doug Haynes	103,011	40.9
Libertarian	Mark Jackson	2,094	0.8
Total votes		251,838	100.00
Democratic hold			

=== 2002 ===
2002 North Carolina's 2nd congressional district election
Party	Candidate	Votes	%
Democratic	Bob Etheridge (incumbent)	100,121	65.36
Republican	Joseph L. Ellen	50,965	33.27
Libertarian	Gary Minter	2,098	1.37
Democratic hold			
Total votes		153,184	100.00

=== 2004 ===
2004 North Carolina's 2nd congressional district election
Party	Candidate	Votes	%
Democratic	Bob Etheridge (incumbent)	145,079	62.3
Republican	Billy J. Creech	87,811	37.7
Total votes		232,890	100.00
Democratic hold			

=== 2006 ===
2006 North Carolina's 2nd congressional district election
Party	Candidate	Votes	%
Democratic	Bob Etheridge (incumbent)	85,993	66.53
Republican	Dan Mansell	43,271	33.47
Total votes		129,264	100.00
Democratic hold			

=== 2008 ===
2008 North Carolina's 2nd congressional district election
Party	Candidate	Votes	%
Democratic	Bob Etheridge (incumbent)	199,730	66.93
Republican	Dan Mansell	93,323	31.27
Libertarian	Will Adkins	5,377	1.8
Total votes		298,430	100.00
Democratic hold			

=== 2010 ===
2010 North Carolina's 2nd congressional district election
Party	Candidate	Votes	%
Republican	Renee Ellmers	93,876	49.47
Democratic	Bob Etheridge (incumbent)	92,393	48.69
Libertarian	Tom Rose	3,505	1.85
Total votes		189,774	100.00
Republican gain from Democratic			

=== 2012 ===
2012 North Carolina's 2nd congressional district election
Party	Candidate	Votes	%
Republican	Renee Ellmers (incumbent)	174,066	55.9
Democratic	Steve Wilkins	128,973	41.42
Libertarian	Brian Irving	8,358	2.68
Total votes		311,397	100.00
Republican hold			

=== 2014 ===
2014 North Carolina's 2nd congressional district election
Party	Candidate	Votes	%
Republican	Renee Ellmers (incumbent)	122,128	58.83
Democratic	Clay Aiken	85,479	41.17
Total votes		207,607	100.00
Republican hold			

=== 2016 ===
2016 North Carolina's 2nd congressional district election
Party	Candidate	Votes	%
Republican	George Holding	221,485	56.71
Democratic	John P. McNeil	169,082	43.29
Total votes		390,567	100.00
Republican hold			

=== 2018 ===
2018 North Carolina's 2nd congressional district election
Party	Candidate	Votes	%
Republican	George Holding (incumbent)	170,072	51.3
Democratic	Linda Coleman	151,977	45.8
Libertarian	Jeff Matemu	9,655	2.9
Total votes		331,704	100.00
Republican hold			

=== 2020 ===
2020 North Carolina's 2nd congressional district election
Party	Candidate	Votes	%
Democratic	Deborah Ross	310,979	63.0
Republican	Alan Swain	172,019	34.8
Libertarian	Jeff Matemu	10,827	2.2
Total votes		493,870	100.00
Democratic gain from Republican			

=== 2022 ===
2022 North Carolina's 2nd congressional district election
Party	Candidate	Votes	%
Democratic	Deborah Ross (incumbent)	190,714	64.7
Republican	Christine Villaverde	104,155	35.3
Total votes		294,869	100.00
Democratic hold			

=== 2024 ===
2024 North Carolina's 2nd congressional district election
Party	Candidate	Votes	%
Democratic	Deborah Ross (incumbent)	268,662	66.3
Republican	Alan Swain	128,164	31.6
Green	Michael Dublin	8,691	2.1
Total votes		405,517	100.0
Democratic hold			

== See also ==
- North Carolina's congressional districts
- List of United States congressional districts
