= 2000 North Carolina Council of State election =

- November 7, 2000

All 10 members of the North Carolina Council of State
	Majority party	Minority party
Party	Democratic	Republican
Last election	10	0
Seats won	9	1
Seat change	▼1	▲1

Elections were held in North Carolina on 7 November 2000, to elect the Council of State. The new Council of State was formally inaugurated on January 6, 2001.

Democrats held open seats for Governor, Attorney General, Agriculture Commissioner, and Treasurer. Republicans flipped the open Commissioner of Labor, which was the first and only win by a Republican for a North Carolina Council of State office (excluding the Governor and Lieutenant Governor) in the 20th century which came just weeks before the end of the century.

== Governor ==
The 2000 North Carolina gubernatorial election was held on November 7, 2000. The general election was between the Republican nominee, former mayor of Charlotte Richard Vinroot and the Democratic nominee, state Attorney General Mike Easley. Easley won by 52% to 46%.

== Lieutenant Governor ==
The 2000 North Carolina lieutenant gubernatorial election was held on 7 November 2000, as part of the elections to the Council of State. The election was won by Democrat Beverly Perdue, who succeeded fellow Democrat Dennis A. Wicker. In the general election, Perdue defeated Republican former state senator Betsy Cochrane by 52% to 46%.

Results by county Perdue: 40–50%; 50–60%; 60–70%; 70–80%; Cochrane: 40–50%; 50–60%; 60–70%; 70–80%

== Attorney General ==
2000 North Carolina Attorney General election
Party	Candidate	Votes	%	±%
Democratic	Roy Cooper	1,446,793	51.21	−7.86
Republican	Dan Boyce	1,310,845	46.40	+5.47
Reform	Margaret Palms	67,536	2.39	N/A
Turnout		2,825,174		

Results by county Cooper: 40–50%; 50–60%; 60–70%; 70–80%; Boyce: 40–50%; 50–60%; 60–70%; 70–80%

== State Auditor ==
2000 North Carolina State Auditor election
Party	Candidate	Votes	%	±%
Democratic	Ralph Campbell (incumbent)	1,392,211	50.51	+0.60
Republican	Les Merritt	1,363,890	49.49	+1.91
Turnout		2,756,101		

Results by county McKee: 50–60%; 60–70%; 70–80%; Regunberg: 50–60%; 60–70%; 70–80%

== Commissioner of Agriculture ==
2000 North Carolina Commissioner of Agriculture election
Party	Candidate	Votes	%	±%
Democratic	Meg Scott Phipps	1,418,164	50.57	–7.23
Republican	Steve Troxler	1,386,311	49.43	+9.25
Turnout		2,804,475		

Results by county Phipps: 50–60%; 60–70%; 70–80%; Troxler: 50–60%; 60–70%; 70–80%

== Commissioner of Insurance ==
2000 North Carolina Commissioner of Insurance election
Party	Candidate	Votes	%	±%
Democratic	James E. Long (incumbent)	1,590,139	56.53	–0.20
Republican	Mike Causey	1,222,527	43.47	+2.17
Turnout		2,812,666		

Results by county Long: 50–60%; 60–70%; 70–80%; 80–90%; Causey: 50–60%; 60–70%

== Commissioner of Labor ==
2000 North Carolina Commissioner of Labor election
Party	Candidate	Votes	%	±%
Republican	Cherie Killian Berry	1,379,417	50.13	+4.60
Democratic	Doug Berger	1,372,165	49.87	–1.11
Turnout		2,751,582		

Incumbent Harry Payne did not run for reelection.

Results by county Berry: 50–60%; 60–70%; 70–80%; Berger: 50–60%; 60–70%; 70–80%; 80–90%

== Secretary of State ==
2000 North Carolina Secretary of State election
Party	Candidate	Votes	%	±%
Democratic	Elaine Marshall (incumbent)	1,512,076	54.44	+0.95
Republican	Harris Durham Blake	1,265,654	45.56	+0.39
Turnout		2,777,730		

Results by county Marshall: 50–60%; 60–70%; 70–80%; Blake: 50–60%; 60–70%; 70–80%

== Superintendent of Public Instruction ==
2000 North Carolina Superintendent of Public Instruction election
Party	Candidate	Votes	%	±%
Democratic	Michael E. Ward (incumbent)	1,475,309	53.36	+1.36
Republican	Michael Barrick	1,289,472	46.64	+0.50
Turnout		2,764,781		

Results by county Ward: 50–60%; 60–70%; 70–80%; 80–90%; Barrick: 50–60%; 60–70%; 70–80%

== State Treasurer ==
2000 North Carolina State Treasurer election
Party	Candidate	Votes	%	±%
Democratic	Richard H. Moore	1,539,761	55.35	+4.72
Republican	Henry McKoy	1,242,202	44.65	–2.87
Turnout		2,781,963		

Results by county Moore: 50–60%; 60–70%; 70–80%; 80–90%; McKoy: 50–60%; 60–70%; 70–80%
