= Aaron Chatterji =

American academic and policymaker

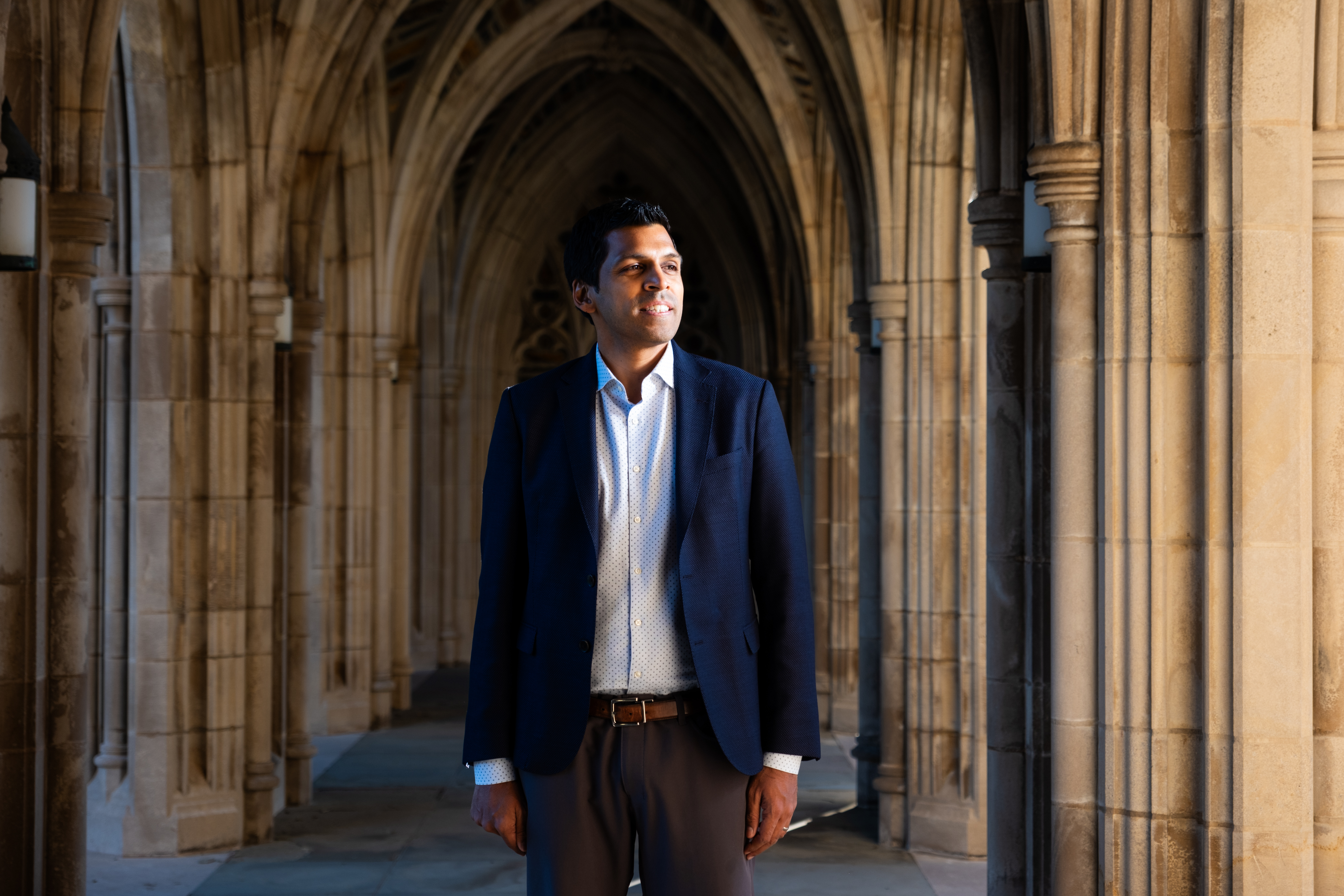
- Chatterji in 2024

White House CHIPS Coordinator and Acting Deputy Director of White House National Economic Council
- In office December 2022 – August 2023
- President: Joseph R. Biden

Personal details
- Born: July 22, 1978 (age 48)
- Party: Democratic
- Education: Cornell University (BA); University of California, Berkeley (PhD)

Aaron "Ronnie" Chatterji (born July 22, 1978) is an American academic and policymaker who served as acting deputy director of the National Economic Council and the White House coordinator for CHIPS Implementation during the Biden administration from September 2022 until August 2023. He was previously the chief economist of the U.S. Department of Commerce, advising the Secretary of Commerce on domestic and international economic issues. Following his departure from the Biden administration, he returned to his post as the Mark Burgess and Lisa Benson-Burgess distinguished professor of business and public policy at Duke's Fuqua School of Business where he focuses on innovation, entrepreneurship, strategic management, and corporate social responsibility.

== Life ==
Chatterji completed his bachelor's degree in economics from Cornell University. After working as a financial analyst at Goldman Sachs, he received his Ph.D. from the Haas School of Business at the University of California at Berkeley. He has been married to his wife, Neely Shah, since 2010.

== Career ==
=== Duke Fuqua School of Business ===
In 2006, Chatterji joined the faculty of the Fuqua School of Business where he is now the Mark Burgess & Lisa Benson-Burgess distinguished professor of business and public policy. He also holds a secondary appointment at Duke's Sanford School of Public Policy.

Chatterji has received several awards for his research. In 2017, he received the Kauffman Prize Medal for Distinguished Research in Entrepreneurship for his significant contributions to the literature of entrepreneurship. Earlier in his career, was recognized with the Rising Star award from the Aspen Institute (2010) and the Strategic Management Society Emerging Scholar award (2015). In 2011, he was named one of the top 40 business professors under 40 by Poets & Quants.

Beyond Duke, Chatterji is a Research Associate at the National Bureau of Economic Research and was previously a visiting associate professor at the Harvard Business School. His first book, Can Business Save the Earth, was co-authored with Michael Lenox. His second book, The Role of Innovation and Entrepreneurship in Economic Growth, provides new insights on the sectoral patterns and concentration of the contributions of innovation and entrepreneurship to economic growth. It was published by the University of Chicago Press in February 2022 and co-authored by Michael J. Andrews and Scott Stern.

=== Obama administration ===
From 2010 to 2011, Chatterji served as a senior economist in President Barack Obama's Council of Economic Advisers. His policy portfolio centered around entrepreneurship and innovation.

=== 2020 North Carolina Treasurer Election ===
In the 2020 North Carolina elections, Chatterji entered his first race for public office, running for North Carolina State Treasurer. On March 3, 2020, Chatterji beat Dimple Ajmera and Matthew Leatherman in the Democratic primary for the party's formal nomination in the general election against Republican incumbent Dale Folwell.

Chatterji's campaign platform centered around three main pillars: (1) greater outcome-driven expansion of healthcare (including Medicaid) throughout the state, (2) modernization of the North Carolina Retirement Systems, and (3) the reorganization of the investment fund management including the hiring of a permanent Chief Investment Officer.

Chatterji's campaign received endorsement from President Obama, then-presidential candidate Joe Biden, and then-vice presidential candidate Kamala Harris. Locally, Chatterji received endorsements from the North Carolina state AFL-CIO, the People's Alliance, the Committee on the Affairs of Black People, and the Raleigh-Wake Citizens Association.

Folwell ultimately defeated Chatterji in the November general election by a 52.6% to 47.4% margin.

=== Biden administration ===
Chatterji joined the Biden administration in 2021 following his appointment as the chief economist at the Department of Commerce by Secretary Gina Raimondo. As the principal economic adviser to the secretary of commerce, his portfolio included domestic manufacturing and international trade.

After the passage of the CHIPS and Science Act, Chatterji departed from his post at the Department of Commerce following his appointment to the National Economic Council (NEC) as the White House coordinator for CHIPS Implementation in September 2022. In this role, he was tasked with managing the work of the CHIPS Implementation Steering Council and establishing cohesion with other administration efforts including the Bipartisan Infrastructure Law, Inflation Reduction Act, and the American Rescue Plan. In December 2022, following the departure of Sameera Fazili from the National Economic Council, Chatterji was additionally appointed as the acting deputy director of the National Economic Council and adopted a part of Fazili's industrial policy portfolio.

Chatterji departed the White House in August 2023, returning to his pre-administration post at Duke University.

=== 2024 OpenAI ===
OpenAI appointed Chatterji as its first chief economist to lead research on AI's economic impact. The stated purpose of his role is to explore how AI influences economic growth, job creation, and long-term labor market trends, including the global economic effects of AI infrastructure. His research aims to guide policymakers, academics, and organizations in maximizing AI's benefits and address challenges associated with its adoption.
