= 2020 North Carolina Council of State elections =

2020 North Carolina Council of State election
- November 3, 2020

All 10 members of the North Carolina Council of State
	Majority party	Minority party
Party	Republican	Democratic
Last election	6	4
Seats won	6	4
Seat change	Steady	Steady
Percentage	50.68%	49.17%
Swing	▼0.52	▲0.97

Elections were held in North Carolina on November 3, 2020, to select the ten officers of the North Carolina Council of State. These elections coincided with the presidential election, elections to the House of Representatives, elections to the Senate and elections to the North Carolina General Assembly and top state courts. Primary elections were held on March 3, 2020, for offices for which more than one candidate filed per party.

The ten members of the North Carolina Council of State are statewide-elected officers serving four-year terms.

The result of the 2020 elections was a Council of State consisting of four Democrats and six Republicans, just as it had been before the elections. Three seats (Lieutenant Governor, Superintendent of Public Instruction and Commissioner of Labor) were open, but in each case, a Republican succeeded a fellow Republican.

== Governor ==
Incumbent governor Roy Cooper, a Democrat, ran for a second term. The Republican Party nominated Lieutenant Governor Dan Forest. The Libertarian Party nominated Steven J. DiFore, and the Constitution Party nominated Al Pisano. Cooper won re-election to a second term with 51.5% of the vote. Cooper received the most votes of any Democrat on the ballot in North Carolina in 2020.

== Lieutenant governor ==
Incumbent lieutenant governor Dan Forest, a Republican, was ineligible to run for a third term due to term limits set by the North Carolina Constitution. Forest ran for the governorship.

The Republican Party nominated Mark Robinson, a businessman and first-time political candidate. The Democratic party nominated State Representative Yvonne Lewis Holley. Robinson defeated Holley, winning 51.6% of the vote to Holley's 48.4%. Robinson thus became North Carolina's first African-American lieutenant governor.

== Attorney general ==
Incumbent attorney general Josh Stein, a Democrat, ran for a second term. He faced Republican nominee Jim O'Neill in the general election. Stein defeated O'Neill by just over 13,000 votes out of over 5.4 million cast.

== Secretary of state ==
2020 North Carolina Secretary of State election
- November 3, 2020
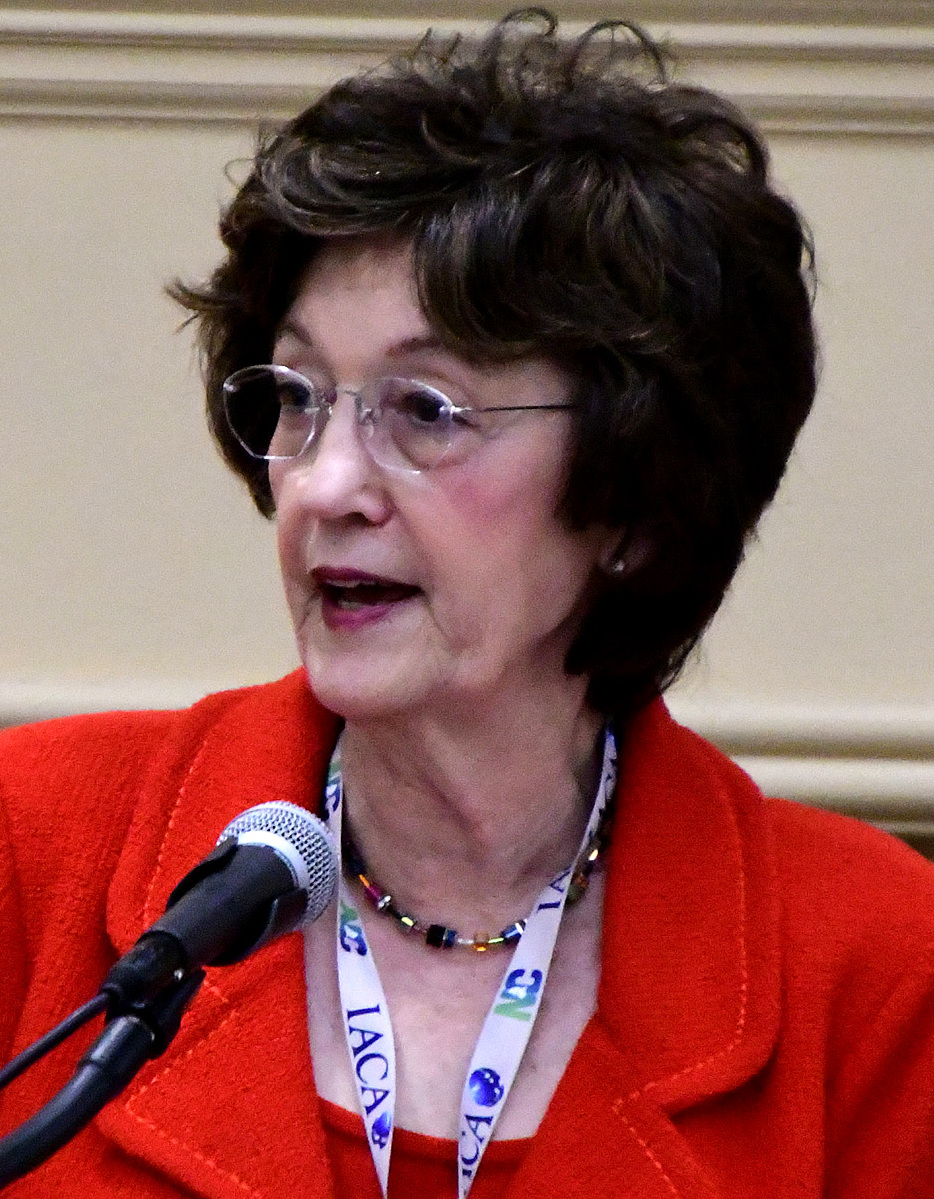

Nominee	Elaine Marshall	E.C. Sykes
Party	Democratic	Republican
Popular vote	2,755,571	2,630,559
Percentage	51.16%	48.84%
- Marshall: 50-60% 60-70% 70-80% 80–90% >90%; Sykes: 50-60% 60-70% 70-80% 80-90% >90%
Secretary of State before election
Elaine Marshall
Democratic
Elected Secretary of State
Elaine Marshall
Democratic

Elaine Marshall, a Democrat, was first elected to the position of secretary of state in 1996 and had held the position since then. She was currently the longest-tenured member of the Council of State. She was unopposed in the primary. The Republican Party nominated businessman E.C. Sykes. Marshall won with 51.2% of the vote, a slightly smaller percentage of the vote than what she received in 2016. She was elected to her seventh term as secretary of state. No Republican had won election to this office since 1872, the longest streak for any state office in the country.

=== Democratic primary ===
==== Candidates ====
===== Declared =====
- Elaine Marshall, incumbent secretary of state

=== Republican primary ===
==== Candidates ====
===== Declared =====
- Chad Brown, Gaston County commissioner
- Michael LaPaglia, business consultant and nominee for North Carolina Secretary of State in 2016
- E.C. Sykes, businessman

==== Polling ====
Poll source	Date(s) administered	Sample size (Note: Key: A – all adults RV – registered voters LV – likely voters V – unclear)	Margin of error	Chad Brown	Michael LaPaglia	E.C. Sykes	Undecided
Harper Polling/Civitas Institute	December 2–4, 2019	500 (LV)	± 4.38%	20%	4%	5%	71%

==== Results ====
Results by county Sykes: 30–40%; 40–50%; 50–60%; 60–70%; Brown: 30–40%; 40–50%; 50–60%; 60–70%; LaPaglia: 30–40%; 40–50%

Republican primary results
Party	Candidate	Votes	%
Republican	E.C. Sykes	296,457	42.9
Republican	Chad Brown	262,595	38.0
Republican	Michael LaPaglia	131,832	19.1
Total votes		690,884	100.0

=== General election ===
==== Predictions ====
Source	Ranking	As of
The Cook Political Report	Likely D	June 25, 2020

==== Polling ====
Poll source	Date(s) administered	Sample size	Margin of error	Elaine Marshall (D)	E.C. Sykes (R)	Undecided
Cardinal Point Analytics (R)	July 22–24, 2020	735 (LV)	± 3.6%	44%	42%	14%
Cardinal Point Analytics (R)	July 13–15, 2020	547 (LV)	± 4.2%	47%	39%	14%

==== Results ====
North Carolina Secretary of State election, 2020
Party	Candidate	Votes	%	±%
Democratic	Elaine Marshall (incumbent)	2,755,571	51.16%	−1.10%
Republican	E.C. Sykes	2,630,559	48.84%	+1.10%
Total votes		5,386,130	100.0%	
Democratic hold				

== State auditor ==
2020 North Carolina State Auditor election
- November 3, 2020

Nominee	Beth Wood	Anthony Wayne Street
Party	Democratic	Republican
Popular vote	2,730,175	2,635,825
Percentage	50.88%	49.12%
- Wood: 50–60% 60–70% 70–80% 80–90%; Street: 50–60% 60–70% 70–80%
State Auditor before election
Beth Wood
Democratic
Elected State Auditor
Beth Wood
Democratic

Incumbent Auditor Beth Wood, a Democrat, ran for a fourth term. She was narrowly re-elected in 2016, winning by just over six thousand votes. Wood was challenged in the Democratic primary by Luis Toledo, a former Assistant State Auditor. Toledo argued that change was needed in the Auditor's office. Beth Wood won the primary by a large margin. Anthony Street, a small business owner and member of the Brunswick County Soil and Water Board, won the Republican primary. Wood won the general election with 50.9% of the vote.

=== Democratic primary ===
==== Candidates ====
===== Declared =====
- Luis Toledo, U.S. Air Force veteran
- Beth Wood, incumbent state auditor

==== Results ====
Results by county Wood: 70–80%; 80–90%; >90%

Democratic primary results
Party	Candidate	Votes	%
Democratic	Beth A. Wood (incumbent)	895,610	77.7
Democratic	Luis A. Toledo	257,433	22.3
Total votes		1,153,043	100.0

=== Republican primary ===
==== Candidates ====
===== Declared =====
- Tim Hoegemeyer, general counsel for the Office of State Auditor and U.S. Marine Corps veteran
- Tony Wayne Street, Brunswick County Soil and Water Board member

==== Results ====
Republican primary results
Party	Candidate	Votes	%
Republican	Anthony Wayne (Tony) Street	379,051	56.2
Republican	Tim Hoegemeyer	295,903	43.8
Total votes		674,954	100.0

=== General election ===
==== Results ====
North Carolina State Auditor election, 2020
Party	Candidate	Votes	%	±%
Democratic	Beth A. Wood (incumbent)	2,730,175	50.88%	+0.81%
Republican	Anthony Wayne (Tony) Street	2,635,825	49.12%	−0.81%
Total votes		5,366,000	100.0%	
Democratic hold				

== State treasurer ==
2020 North Carolina State Treasurer election
- November 3, 2020
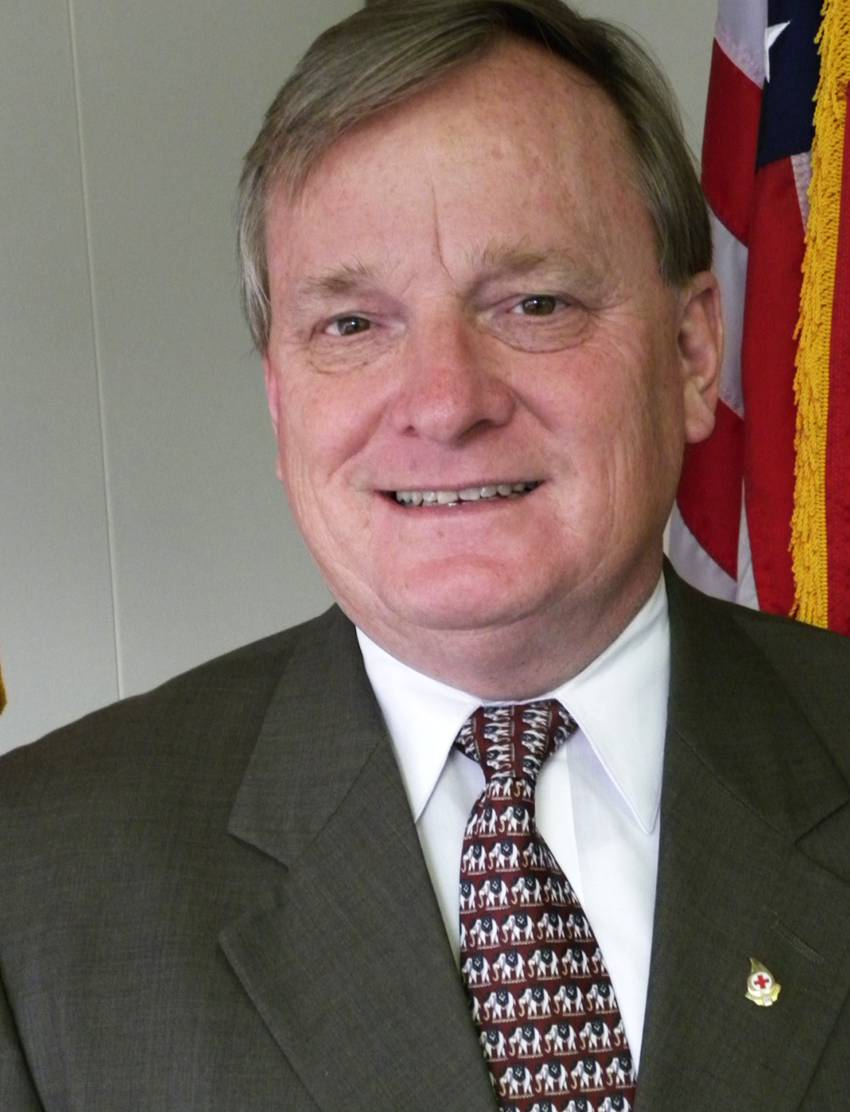

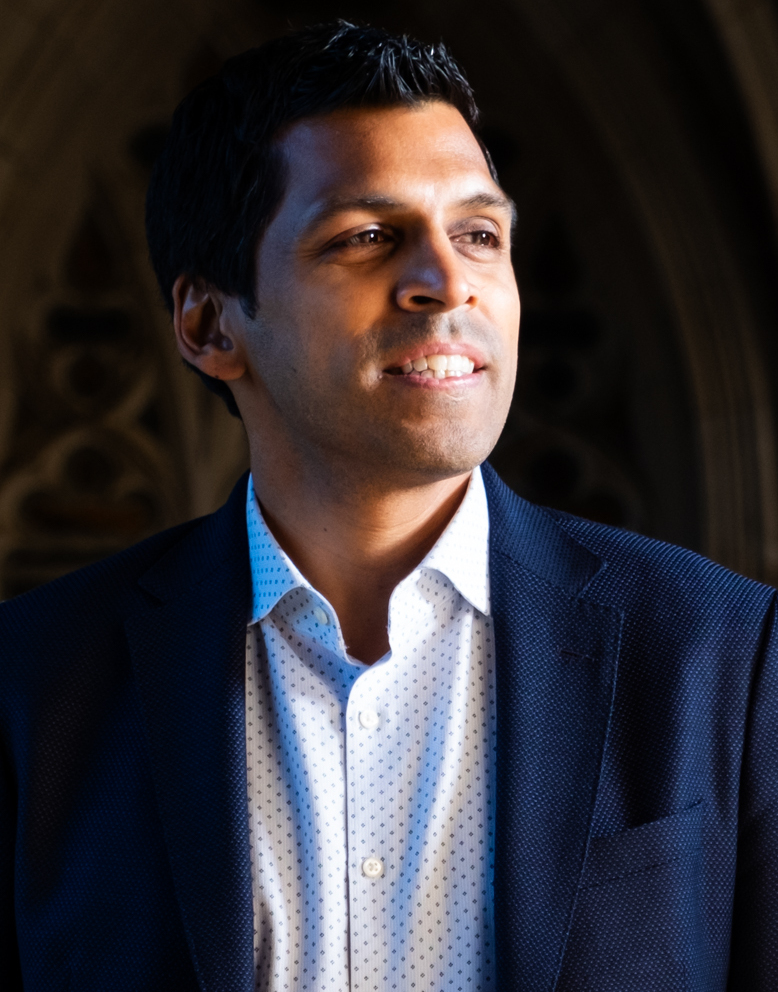
Nominee	Dale Folwell	Ronnie Chatterji
Party	Republican	Democratic
Popular vote	2,812,799	2,537,019
Percentage	52.58%	47.42%
- Folwell: 50-60% 60-70% 70-80%; Chatterji: 50-60% 60-70% 70-80%
State Treasurer before election
Dale Folwell
Republican
Elected State Treasurer
Dale Folwell
Republican

Incumbent Treasurer Dale Folwell, a Republican, ran for a second term.

Duke University professor Ronnie Chatterji won the nomination of the Democratic Party by receiving 36% of the vote in the primary. He defeated Charlotte City Council member Dimple Ajmera and Matt Leatherman, who served as policy director for former state treasurer Janet Cowell.

Folwell defeated Chatterji in the general election. Folwell won 52.6% of the vote to Chatterji's 47.4%.

=== Democratic primary ===
==== Candidates ====
===== Declared =====
- Dimple Ajmera, Charlotte city councilwoman
- Ronnie Chatterji, professor at Duke University
- Matt Leatherman, policy director for former North Carolina State Treasurer Janet Cowell

==== Polling ====
Poll source	Date(s) administered	Sample size	Margin of error	Dimple Ajmera	Ronnie Chatterji	Matt Leatherman	Undecided
Public Policy Polling	February 2–4, 2020	604 (LV)	-	9%	4%	8%	80%
Public Policy Polling	January 10–12, 2020	509 (LV)	-	10%	5%	6%	80%

==== Results ====
Primary results by county: Chatterji: Chatterji—61-70%; Chatterji—51-60%; Chatterji—41-50%; Chatterji—31-40%; Ajmera: Ajmera—61-70%; Ajmera—51-60%; Ajmera—41-50%; Ajmera—31-40%; Leatherman: Leatherman—51-60%; Leatherman—41-50%; Leatherman—31-40%

Democratic primary results
Party	Candidate	Votes	%
Democratic	Ronnie Chatterji	411,732	35.8
Democratic	Dimple Ajmera	390,888	34.0
Democratic	Matt Leatherman	347,226	30.2
Total votes		1,149,846	100.0

=== Republican primary ===
==== Candidates ====
===== Declared =====
- Dale Folwell, incumbent state treasurer

=== General election ===
==== Polling ====
Poll source	Date(s) administered	Sample size	Margin of error	Dale Folwell (R)	Ronnie Chatterji (D)	Other	Undecided
East Carolina University	October 27–28, 2020	1,103 (LV)	± 3.4%	48%	44%	3% (Note: Did/would not vote with 3%)	5%
Meeting Street Insights (R)	October 24–27, 2020	600 (LV)	± 4%	44%	45%	–	8%
Harper Polling/Civitas (R)	October 22–25, 2020	504 (LV)	± 4.4%	43%	44%	–	13%
East Carolina University	October 15–18, 2020	1,155 (LV)	± 3.4%	47%	43%	3% (Note: Would/did not vote with 3%)	7%
East Carolina University	October 2–4, 2020	1,232 (LV)	± 3.2%	44%	44%	1% (Note: Would not vote with 1%)	11%
Harper Polling/Civitas (R)	September 17–20, 2020	612 (LV)	± 3.96%	39%	39%	–	22%
East Carolina University	August 29–30, 2020	1,101 (LV)	± 3.4%	41%	40%	5% (Note: "Some other candidate" with 3%; would not vote with 2%)	14%

==== Results ====
North Carolina State Treasurer election, 2020
Party	Candidate	Votes	%	±%
Republican	Dale Folwell (incumbent)	2,812,799	52.58%	−0.12%
Democratic	Ronnie Chatterji	2,537,019	47.42%	+0.12%
Total votes		5,349,818	100.0%	
Republican hold				

== Superintendent of Public Instruction ==
Mark Johnson was elected to the position of State Superintendent in 2016, defeating incumbent June Atkinson by a narrow margin. Johnson opted not to run for a second term as Superintendent, instead declaring his candidacy for lieutenant governor. Republican Catherine Truitt, chancellor of Western Governors University North Carolina and a former education advisor to Governor Pat McCrory defeated Democrat Jen Mangrum, an associate professor at UNC Greensboro, in the general election.

== Commissioner of Agriculture ==
2020 North Carolina Commissioner of Agriculture election
- November 3, 2020
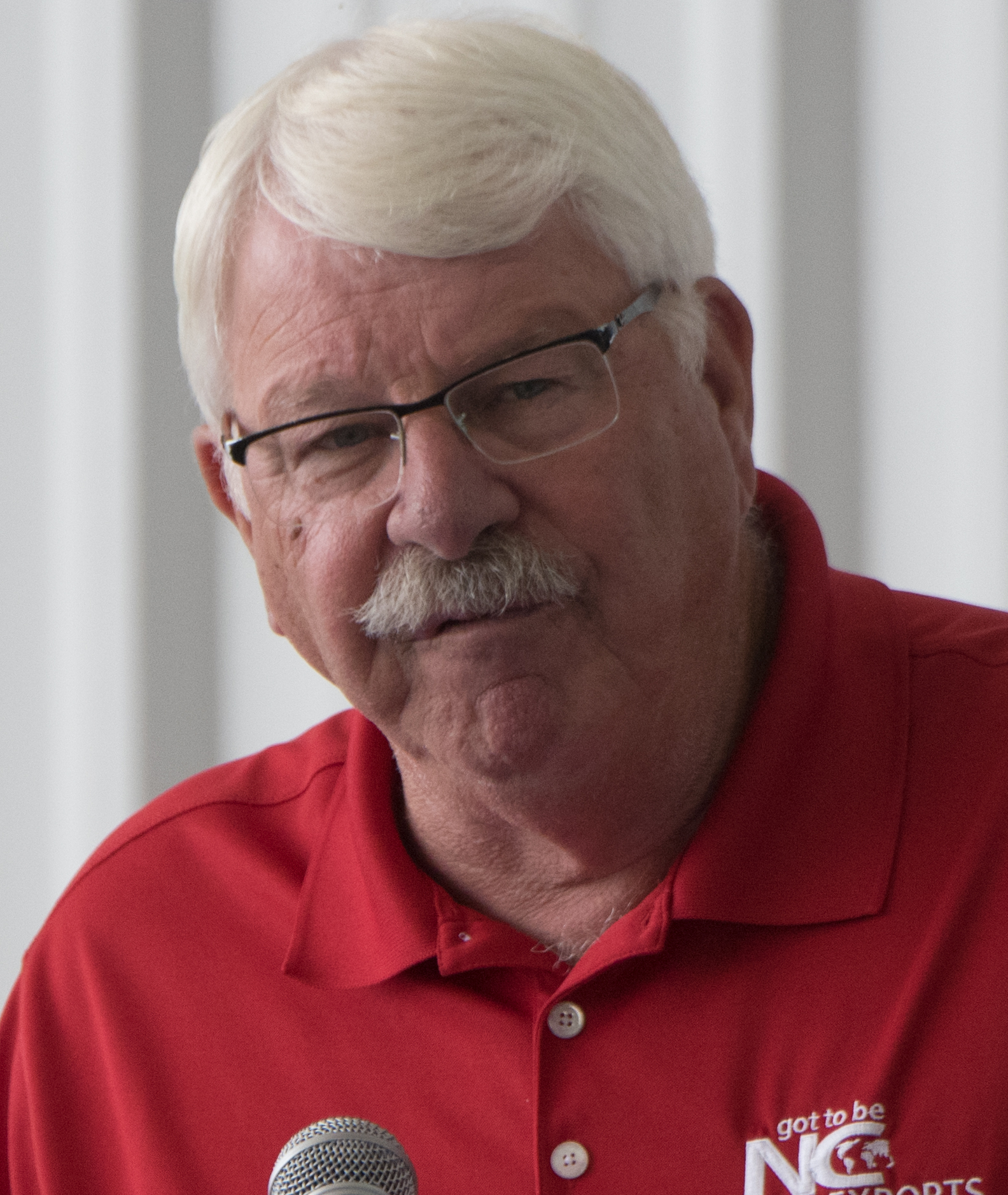

Nominee	Steve Troxler	Jenna Wadsworth
Party	Republican	Democratic
Popular vote	2,901,849	2,485,722
Percentage	53.86%	46.14%
- County results; Troxler: 50-60% 60-70% 70-80% 80-90%; Wadsworth: 50-60% 60-70% 70-80%
Commissioner of Agriculture before election
Steve Troxler
Republican
Elected Commissioner of Agriculture
Steve Troxler
Republican

Incumbent Commissioner Steve Troxler, a Republican, was first elected in 2004. He was unopposed in the primary.

Three Democrats ran to challenge Troxler: Walter Smith, who ran for the office in 2012 and 2016 (losing to Troxler both times), Jenna Wadsworth, a Wake County Soil and Water Conservation District supervisor, and Donovan Alexander Watson, a businessman from Durham. Wadsworth came in first place in the primary.

On election day, Troxler won a fifth term as Agriculture Commissioner. He won 53.9% of the statewide vote, a slightly smaller percentage than he received in 2016, when he won 55.6%. Despite this, Troxler still won the largest percentage of the vote of statewide candidate in North Carolina in 2020.

=== Democratic primary ===
==== Candidates ====
===== Declared =====
- Walter Smith, 2012 and 2016 Democratic nominee
- Jenna Wadsworth, Wake County Soil and Water Conservation District supervisor
- Donovan Alexander Watson, businessman

==== Results ====
Primary results by county: Wadsworth: Wadsworth—71-80%; Wadsworth—61-70%; Wadsworth—51-60%; Wadsworth—41-50%; Smith: Smith—71-80%; Smith—61-70%; Smith—51-60%; Smith—41-50%; Smith—31-40%

Democratic primary results
Party	Candidate	Votes	%
Democratic	Jenna Wadsworth	609,910	54.0
Democratic	Walter Smith	344,111	30.5
Democratic	Donovan Alexander Watson	175,207	15.5
Total votes		1,129,228	100.0

=== Republican primary ===
==== Candidates ====
===== Declared =====
- Steve Troxler, incumbent Agriculture Commissioner (unopposed in the primary)

=== General election ===
==== Polling ====
Poll source	Date(s) administered	Sample size	Margin of error	Steve Troxler (R)	Jenna Wadsworth (D)	Undecided
Meeting Street Insights (R)	October 24–27, 2020	600 (LV)	± 4%	50%	42%	6%
Harper Polling/Civitas (R)	October 22–25, 2020	504 (LV)	± 4.4%	47%	44%	9%
Harper Polling/Civitas (R)	August 6–10, 2020	600 (LV)	± 4.0%	42%	34%	24%

==== Results ====
North Carolina Commissioner of Agriculture election, 2020
Party	Candidate	Votes	%	±%
Republican	Steve Troxler (incumbent)	2,901,849	53.86%	−1.60%
Democratic	Jenna Wadsworth	2,485,722	46.14%	+1.60%
Total votes		5,387,571	100.0%	
Republican hold				

== Commissioner of Labor ==
2020 North Carolina Commissioner of Labor election
- November 3, 2020
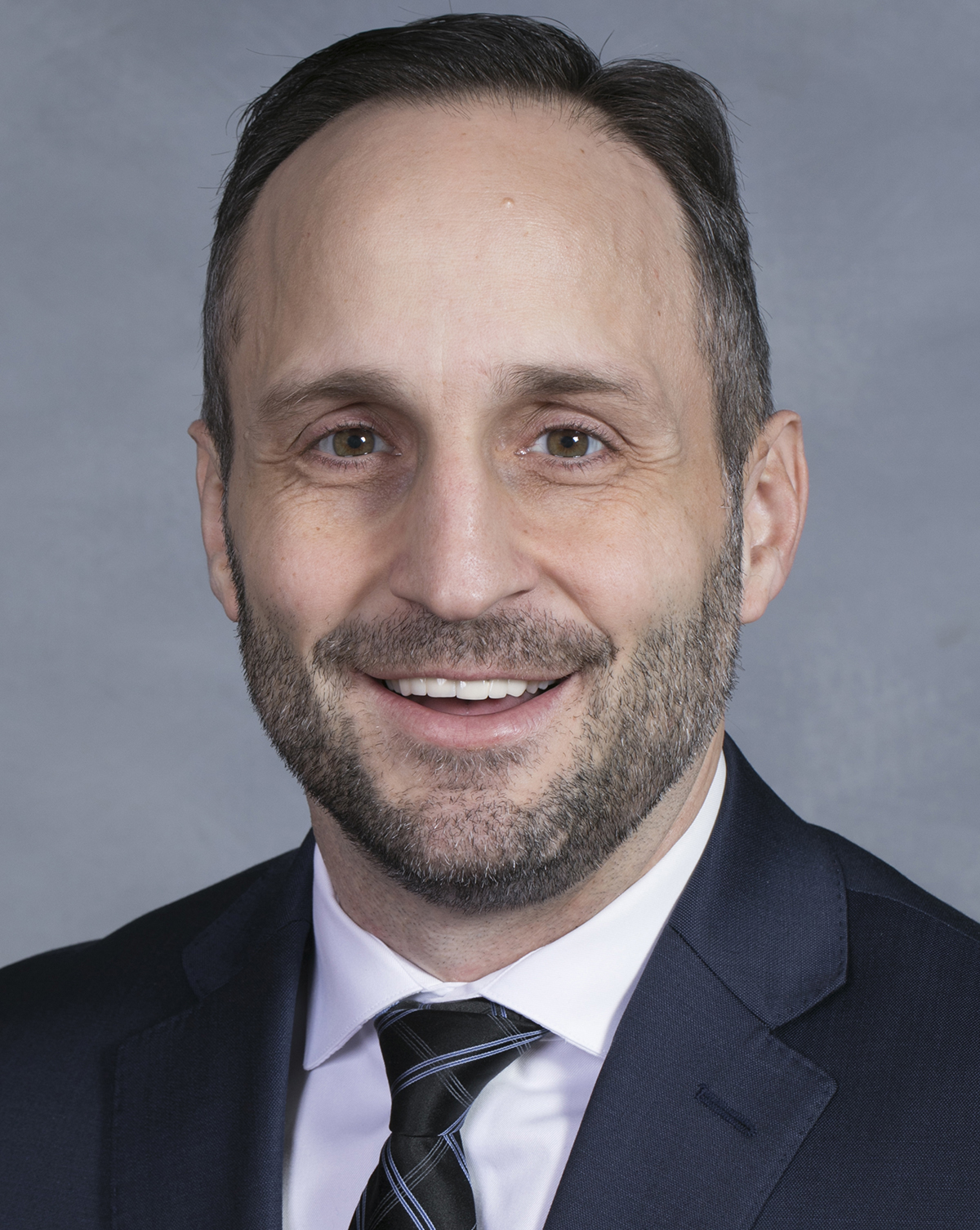

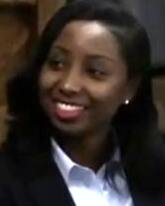
Nominee	Josh Dobson	Jessica Holmes
Party	Republican	Democratic
Popular vote	2,726,619	2,637,528
Percentage	50.83%	49.17%
- County results; Dobson: 50-60% 60-70% 70-80% 80-90%; Holmes: 50-60% 60-70% 70-80% 80–90%
Commissioner of Labor before election
Cherie Berry
Republican
Elected Commissioner of Labor
Josh Dobson
Republican

Cherie Berry was first elected to the position of Commissioner of Labor in 2000 and took office as only the second Republican Labor Commissioner in the history of North Carolina. On April 2, 2019, Berry announced that she would not seek re-election, and would retire from politics. Josh Dobson, a member of the North Carolina House of Representatives since 2013, won the Republican primary over Chuck Stanley, a construction safety manager, and former State Rep. Pearl Burris-Floyd. Wake County commissioner Jessica Holmes was the only Democrat to run. Dobson won the general election with 50.8% of the vote.

=== Democratic primary ===
==== Candidates ====
===== Declared =====
- Jessica Holmes, Wake County commissioner (unopposed in the primary)

=== Republican primary ===
==== Candidates ====
===== Declared =====
- Pearl Burris-Floyd, former state representative
- Josh Dobson, state representative
- Chuck Stanley, construction safety manager

===== Declined =====
- Cherie Berry, incumbent State Labor Commissioner

==== Results ====
Republican primary results
Party	Candidate	Votes	%
Republican	Josh Dobson	274,379	40.3
Republican	Chuck Stanley	257,883	37.9
Republican	Pearl Burris-Floyd	148,710	21.8
Total votes		680,972	100.0

=== General election ===
Poll source	Date(s) administered	Sample size	Margin of error	Josh Dobson (R)	Jessica Holmes (D)	Undecided
Meeting Street Insights (R)	October 24–27, 2020	600 (LV)	± 4%	43%	47%	7%

==== Results ====
North Carolina Commissioner of Labor election, 2020
Party	Candidate	Votes	%	±%
Republican	Josh Dobson	2,726,619	50.83%	−4.36%
Democratic	Jessica Holmes	2,637,528	49.17%	+4.47%
Total votes		5,364,147	100.0%	
Republican hold				

== Commissioner of Insurance ==
2020 North Carolina Commissioner of Insurance election
- November 3, 2020
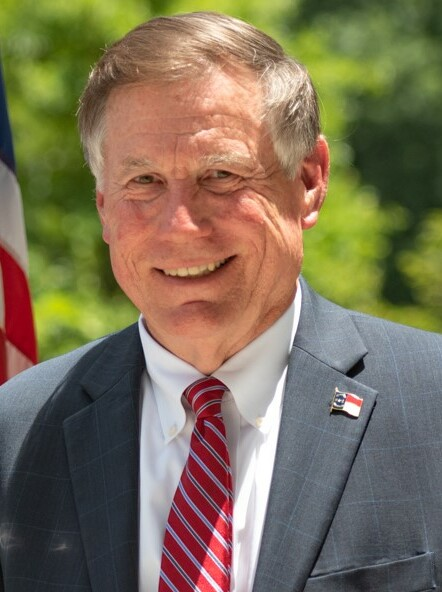

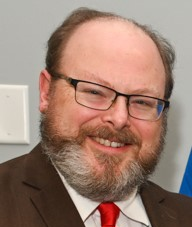
Nominee	Mike Causey	Wayne Goodwin
Party	Republican	Democratic
Popular vote	2,775,488	2,586,464
Percentage	51.76%	48.24%
- County results; Causey: 50-60% 60-70% 70-80% 80-90%; Goodwin: 50-60% 60-70% 70-80%
Commissioner of Insurance before election
Mike Causey
Republican
Elected Commissioner of Insurance
Mike Causey
Republican

Incumbent Commissioner Mike Causey, a Republican, ran for a second term.

=== Democratic primary ===
==== Candidates ====
===== Declared =====
- Wayne Goodwin, chairman of the North Carolina Democratic Party and former State Insurance Commissioner (2009–2017)

=== Republican primary ===
==== Candidates ====
===== Declared =====
- Mike Causey, incumbent State Insurance Commissioner
- Ronald Pierce, candidate for North Carolina Commissioner of Insurance in 2016

==== Results ====
Republican primary results
Party	Candidate	Votes	%
Republican	Mike Causey (incumbent)	448,066	64.6
Republican	Ronald Pierce	245,851	35.4
Total votes		693,917	100.0

=== General election ===
==== Polling ====
Poll source	Date(s) administered	Sample size	Margin of error	Mike Causey (R)	Wayne Goodwin (D)	Undecided
Cardinal Point Analytics (R)	July 22–24, 2020	735 (LV)	± 3.6%	45%	37%	8%
Cardinal Point Analytics (R)	July 13–15, 2020	547 (LV)	± 4.2%	41%	39%	20%

==== Results ====
North Carolina Commissioner of Insurance election, 2020
Party	Candidate	Votes	%	±%
Republican	Mike Causey (incumbent)	2,775,488	51.76%	+1.36%
Democratic	Wayne Goodwin	2,586,464	48.24%	−1.36%
Total votes		5,361,952	100.0%	
Republican hold				

== Aftermath ==
The Council of State was sworn in on January 9, 2021.

== See also ==
- 2020 North Carolina judicial elections
- 2020 North Carolina elections
