= North Carolina Council of State =

Collective decision-making body of the state

- State seal

Council overview
- Formed: 1776
- Jurisdiction: Government of North Carolina

The North Carolina Council of State is the collective body of ten elective executive offices in the state government of North Carolina, all of which are established by the state constitution. The Council of State includes the governor, lieutenant governor, secretary of state, state auditor, treasurer, superintendent of public instruction, attorney general, commissioner of agriculture, commissioner of labor, and commissioner of insurance. Together with the North Carolina Cabinet and several independent agencies, the Council of State offices constitute the executive branch of North Carolina's state government.

The body has its origin in the British colonial government of North Carolina. Under North Carolina's first constitution as a U.S. state, the Council of State comprised seven persons elected by the North Carolina General Assembly to advise the governor. The 1868 constitution redefined the Council of State as the secretary of state, state treasurer, state auditor, superintendent of public works, and superintendent of public instruction. The superintendent of public works was soon abolished, additional elective offices were later added, and the governor was made a formal member of the council. The Council of State usually meets monthly and is responsible for approving various transactions concerning state real property and finances.

== History ==
As a British colony, the Province of North Carolina was under the leadership of a royal governor. A Governor's Council was created to advise the governor, and it comprised residents of the colony appointed by the lords proprietors and eventually the British Crown. The body also served as the upper house of the colonial legislature when it was in session. One member served as president of the council, and could take charge of the colony if the governor or their deputy were unable to exercise their duties. The president, in their legislative capacity, also signed all laws passed by the legislature. Vacancies on the council were filled by the governor's interim appointment until the lords or the Crown made a new appointment. In practice, many councilors held other government offices and often competed with the governor and the lower house of the legislature for authority. As a body, the council held great influence over the content of executive decrees, the dispensation of patronage, and the awarding of land grants.

North Carolina declared independence from Great Britain in 1776. Its first constitution, ratified in December, provided for a Council of State to "advise the Governor in the execution of his office". The council consisted of seven persons selected by both houses of the North Carolina General Assembly in a joint vote for a one-year term. The councilors were barred from holding legislative office. Vacancies on the council could only be filled by the General Assembly. In practice, the Council of State limited the governor's executive authority, as sometimes the governor was required to get their approval before taking a course of action. The council itself could not take action without the governor. The first council was elected by the constitutional convention in December 1776 and took office the following year, serving until they were replaced by the General Assembly's choices.

A new constitution was adopted in 1868, and provided that the Council of State should consist of six popularly-elected executive officials serving ex officio: the secretary of state, state auditor, state treasurer, superintendent of public works, and superintendent of public instruction. Under the constitution, the governor called and presided over the council's meetings and the attorney general served as its legal advisor, but neither were formally members of it. The office of superintendent of public works was abolished via constitutional amendment in 1873. The popularly-elected offices of the commissioner of agriculture, commissioner of labor, and commissioner of insurance were elevated to constitutional status in 1944 and added to the council. Constitutional revisions which took effect in 1971 made the governor, lieutenant governor, and attorney general all ex officio members of the council. The revisions also eliminated the responsibility of the council to "advise the Governor in the execution of his office". In 1987, Governor James G. Martin sued the other members of the Council of State during a dispute over securing a leasing agreement for government office space. The North Carolina Supreme Court ruled that the Council of State could block decisions of the governor, but it could not take positive action on its own accord.

Most Council of State members have historically been white men. Ralph Campbell Jr., who assumed the office of state auditor in 1993, was the first black person to serve on the Council of State. Janice Faulkner was the first woman to serve on the council, having been appointed secretary of state to fill a vacancy in 1996. Elaine Marshall, who became Secretary of State in January 1997, was the first woman elected to a Council of State office. Jessica Holmes was the first black woman to serve on the council, having been appointed state auditor to fill a vacancy in 2023.

== Structure ==
The Council of State comprises the holders of the ten offices established by Article III of the Constitution of North Carolina: governor, lieutenant governor, secretary of state, state auditor, state treasurer, superintendent of public instruction, attorney general, commissioner of agriculture, commissioner of labor, and commissioner of insurance. All serve as the chief executive of their respective departments. They are elected to four-year terms and, aside from the governor and lieutenant governor, without term limits. Contested elections for any of these offices are resolved by a majority vote of the General Assembly. In the event of a vacancy in any of the offices aside from that of the governor and lieutenant governor, the governor can appoint an interim official until the next biennial state election. The office of governor is subject to its own line of succession. Council of State officers can be impeached and removed from office for malfeasance by the General Assembly. The officers' salaries are fixed by the General Assembly and cannot be reduced during their terms of office. As of 2025, the governor's annual salary is $203,073, while other Council of State members receive $168,384 in annual compensation. Together with the North Carolina Cabinet and several independent agencies, the Council of State offices constitute the executive branch of North Carolina's state government.

The governor serves as the chairman of the Council of State. The body routinely meets the first or second Tuesday of every month in sessions subject to the state's open meeting law which the public can attend. The governor also sometimes consults the rest of the council over email during emergencies or otherwise unanticipated situations. The council retains a staff, which records the minutes of each meeting and supplies them to the council members. The secretary of state maintains the schedule and agenda of council meetings. The 2022 state budget includes plans for the construction of a permanent meeting place for the council to begin in 2023.

== Powers and duties ==
The Constitution of North Carolina assigns minimal duties to the Council of State; per Article III, Section 3, it may call the General Assembly into an extraordinary session to consider the governor's mental capacity, and, per Article III, Section 5, the governor must consult it before they call the assembly into an extraordinary session. The council's most significant responsibilities have been assigned by statute, most dealing with real property and financial transactions. This includes approving the governor's acquisitions and disposals of state property, approving property allocations, authorizing taking on debt in anticipation of tax revenue, authorizing the state treasurer to borrow money in times of crisis, creating emergency funds, approving bond issues, and advising the governor and treasurer on assurance investments, approving of banks in which state funds can be deposited, and approving securities in which state funds may be invested. If the governor exercises a power or authority which requires the concurrence of the council, they are required by law to secure the body's approval within 48 hours of exercising said power.

== Incumbent Council of State members ==
Office	Incumbent	Photo	Party	Source
Governor	Josh Stein		Democratic	
Lieutenant Governor	Rachel Hunt		Democratic	
Secretary of State	Elaine Marshall		Democratic	
State Auditor	Dave Boliek		Republican	
State Treasurer	Brad Briner		Republican	
Superintendent of Public Instruction	Mo Green		Democratic	
Attorney General	Jeff Jackson		Democratic	
Commissioner of Agriculture	Steve Troxler		Republican	
Commissioner of Labor	Luke Farley		Republican	
Commissioner of Insurance	Mike Causey		Republican	

== See also ==
- North Carolina Council of State elections: 1996, 2000, 2004, 2008, 2012, 2016, 2020, 2024

== Works cited ==
- Cheney, John L. Jr., ed. (1981). North Carolina Government, 1585-1979: A Narrative and Statistical History (revised ed.). Raleigh: North Carolina Secretary of State. OCLC 1290270510.
- Fleer, Jack (2007). Governors Speak. University Press of America. ISBN 978-0-7618-3564-6.
- Fleer, Jack D. (1994). North Carolina Government & Politics. Lincoln: University of Nebraska Press. ISBN 978-0-8032-6885-2.
- Guillory, Ferrel (June 1988). "The Council of State and North Carolina's Long Ballot: A Tradition Hard to Change" (PDF). N.C. Insight. N.C. Center for Public Policy Research. pp. 40–44.
- North Carolina Manual (PDF). Raleigh: North Carolina Department of the Secretary of State. 2011. OCLC 2623953. Archived from the original (PDF) on August 2, 2023.
- Orth, John V.; Newby, Paul M. (2013). The North Carolina State Constitution (second ed.). Oxford University Press. ISBN 978-0-19-930065-5.
