= William Paul Roberts =

American politician

William P. Roberts
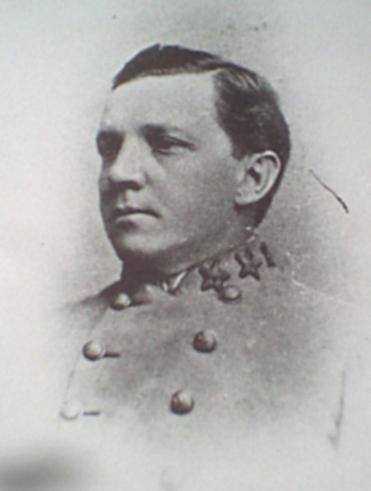
- Roberts in uniform, c. 1864

4th Auditor of North Carolina
- In office 1881–1889
- Preceded by: Samuel L. Love
- Succeeded by: George W. Sandlin

Personal details
- Born: William Paul Roberts; July 11, 1841 Gates County, North Carolina
- Died: March 28, 1910 (aged 68) Norfolk, Virginia
- Resting place: Gatesville, North Carolina
- Party: Democratic

Military service
- Allegiance: Confederate States
- Branch/service: Confederate States Army
- Years of service: 1861–1865
- Rank: Brigadier-General
- Commands: Roberts' Cavalry Brigade
- Battles/wars: American Civil War: Battle of Fredericksburg; Battle of Suffolk; Battle of Brandy Station; Second Battle of Ream's Station; Battle of Five Forks; Siege of Petersburg; Appomattox Campaign (POW)

William P. Roberts (July 11, 1841 – March 28, 1910) was an American politician and diplomat. He was also a senior officer of the Confederate States Army who commanded cavalry in the Eastern Theater of the American Civil War. Promoted to Brigadier-General at the age of 23, he was the youngest Confederate general.

== Early life ==
William Paul Roberts was born July 11, 1841, in Gates County, North Carolina, the son of John S. and Jane Roberts.

== American Civil War ==
In 1861, at the age of 19, Roberts enlisted as a private in Company C of the 19th Regiment North Carolina Infantry, which would later be designated as the 2nd Regiment NC Cavalry. Having served with distinction during regimental operations in North Carolina, but with no formal military training, he was promoted to second lieutenant on August 30, 1861. On September 13, 1862, Roberts was promoted to First Lieutenant. Roberts' regiment was transferred to Virginia in the fall of the same year and took part in several battles, among them: Battle of Fredericksburg, Battle of Suffolk, and Battle of Brandy Station. On November 13, 1863, Roberts was promoted to captain and then major before the spring of 1864, when he fought in the North Carolina brigade of William Henry Fitzhugh Lee's division. He was promoted to colonel in June 1864 and during the Siege of Petersburg, he was given command of the 2nd Regiment NC Cavalry. Roberts led a charge against Union breastworks, dismounted, overtook the rifle pits and captured several Union soldiers at the Second Battle of Ream's Station on August 25, 1864. On February 23, 1865, Roberts was promoted to brigadier general. According to tradition, General Robert E. Lee presented Roberts with Lee's personal gauntlets in recognition of Roberts' distinguished service. Roberts continued the command of his brigade at the Battle of Five Forks, and eventually surrendered at the Battle of Appomattox Court House, on April 9, 1865.

== Later life ==
Following the War, Roberts returned to Gates County, North Carolina, where he married Eliza Ann Roberts. He entered state politics as the representative for Gates County at the Constitutional Convention in 1875. In 1876, Roberts was elected to the North Carolina legislature. He eventually became the Auditor of North Carolina and served in that capacity from 1880 until 1888. In 1889, President Grover Cleveland appointed him United States Consul for Victoria, British Columbia.

== Death ==
Roberts died in Norfolk, Virginia, on March 28, 1910. He is buried in his home county at Gatesville, North Carolina.

== See also ==
- Galusha Pennypacker, youngest Union Army general
- List of American Civil War generals (Confederate)

== Notes ==
Party political offices
Preceded by Samuel L. Love	Democratic nominee for North Carolina State Auditor; 1880, 1884	Succeeded by George W. Sanderlin
Political offices
Preceded by Samuel L. Love	Auditor of North Carolina; 1881–1889	Succeeded by George W. Sanderlin
