= Dave Boliek =

American politician

19th State Auditor of North Carolina
- Incumbent
- Assumed office January 1, 2025
- Governor: Josh Stein
- Preceded by: Jessica Holmes

Personal details
- Born: 1967 or 1968 (age 58–59)
- Party: Republican
- Education: University of North Carolina, Chapel Hill (BA); Campbell University (MBA, JD)

David Luther Boliek Jr. (born 1967 or 1968) is an American politician from North Carolina. He is a Republican and has served as the North Carolina State Auditor since 2025.

== Early life and career ==
Boliek earned his Bachelor of Arts from the University of North Carolina at Chapel Hill (UNC) and a Master of Business Administration and Juris Doctor from Campbell University. He was appointed to the UNC Chapel-Hill board of trustees in 2019 and was selected as chairman in 2021.

Boliek served as an assistant district attorney in Cumberland County.

== Political career ==
Boliek was originally a registered Democrat. In 2009, Democratic State Senator Tony Rand announced his resignation, and Boliek offered himself as a potential successor. Governor Bev Perdue instead appointed Margaret H. Dickson to fill the vacancy, and Boliek contributed to her campaign fund. He supported her Republican successor, Wesley Meredith, in his 2014 reelection campaign. After 2019, his financial contributions to Republicans' campaigns dramatically increased. In 2023, he registered with the Republican Party.

=== North Carolina State Auditor ===
Boliek ran for state auditor in the 2024 elections. He later declared that he was inspired to be politically involved by Donald Trump. Boliek campaigned on auditing the North Carolina Division of Motor Vehicles., which later won national recognition for the Office. In the Republican Party primary election, Boliek and accountant Jack Clark advanced to a runoff election, where Boliek defeated Clark. He won the November general election against incumbent auditor Jessica Holmes.

After the North Carolina General Assembly transferred power over the State Board of Elections from the governor to the auditor, Boliek appointed new members to the State Board of Elections and chairs to the County Boards of Elections.

The state legislature and the governor approved the DAVE Act (Division of Accountability, Value, and Efficiency), which established a new division under the State Auditor’s Office tasked with investigating state government waste. The statewide efficiency effort has been linked to the federal DOGE effort. The division is to be dissolved on the last day of Boliek's term.

== Personal life ==
Boliek and his wife, Haden, have four children.

Boliek is an Eagle Scout. He is a Christian and serves as an elder in his church.

Political offices
Preceded by Jessica Holmes	Auditor of North Carolina; 2025–present	Incumbent
