= Beth Wood =

American politician

17th Auditor of North Carolina
- In office January 10, 2009 – December 15, 2023
- Governor: Bev Perdue; Pat McCrory; Roy Cooper
- Preceded by: Les Merritt
- Succeeded by: Jessica Holmes

Personal details
- Born: April 22, 1954 (age 72) New Bern, North Carolina, U.S.
- Party: Democratic
- Education: Wayne Community College (AS); East Carolina University (BA)

Beth A. Wood (born April 22, 1954) is an American politician and accountant who formerly served as the Auditor of North Carolina from 2009 until 2023. A Democrat, she is the first woman to hold the office. Born in New Bern, she initially worked as a dental hygienist before getting a degree in accounting in 1984. In the mid-1990s Wood took a job in the Office of the North Carolina State Treasurer, where she was responsible for approving audits of local governments. She later took a job in the office of the Auditor of North Carolina, and was promoted to head of the training division.

Wood successfully challenged incumbent State Auditor Les Merritt in the 2008 election and was sworn-in the following January. She was re-elected in 2012, 2016, and 2020. After being indicted on a misdemeanor charge of misusing a state-issued vehicle, Wood announced that she would resign as the North Carolina state auditor, effective December 15, 2023.

== Early life ==
Beth A. Wood was born on April 22, 1954, to Darrel Wood and Betty Wood in New Bern, North Carolina. She grew up in Cove City, North Carolina. She graduated from West Craven High School in 1972. She graduated from Wayne Community College with an Associate's Degree and worked initially as a dental hygienist. After deciding she wanted to make more money, she enrolled at East Carolina University in 1982 to study accounting and earned her Bachelor's of Science degree two years later. She became a certified public accountant in 1987. She worked at the Rayovac Corporation, as a CPA for McGladrey & Pullen, and as the chief financial officer for a furniture company.

In the mid-1990s Wood took a job in the Office of the North Carolina State Treasurer, where she was responsible for approving audits of local governments. In 1997, she applied for a position in the Office of the Auditor of North Carolina. She was not hired for the job, but State Auditor Ralph Campbell Jr. placed her in the office's training division. He later promoted her to head of the division. She continued to hold the post until she resigned in 2007 to challenge incumbent State Auditor Les Merritt in the 2008 election.

== State Auditor ==
=== Elections ===
Wood, a member of the Democratic Party, announced her intention to seek the office of State Auditor in December 2007. Endorsed by Campbell, she defeated Fred Aikens in the May Democratic primary and faced Merritt in the general election. She split her time between campaigning and working as an investigator for the American Institute of Certified Public Accountants. During the 2008 campaign Wood accused Merritt of making partisan investigations, particularly his decision to release a critical audit shortly before the election of trips to Europe in which state officials and First Lady of North Carolina Mary P. Easley spent $110,000. Wood defeated Merritt in November by over 290,000 votes. Political observers were surprised by her victory.

Wood was re-elected in November 2012 by over 318,000 votes over Republican Debra Goldman. Wood was narrowly re-elected to a third term as state auditor in the 2016 general election over Republican Chuck Stuber by just 6,042 votes, margin of 0.14 percent. She won another term in 2020.

=== Tenure ===
Wood was sworn in on January 10, 2009, becoming North Carolina's first female state auditor. She slowed the office's pace of investigative auditing in her first term, citing her desire to produce stronger findings. She was widely criticized for not expeditiously releasing an audit of Easley's salary from North Carolina State University, with her critics accusing her of protecting a fellow Democrat from scrutiny.

In 2013 Wood's office found that North Carolina spent the highest administration costs in the implementation of the Medicaid program among all the states. Auditors suggested that organizational issues in the Department of Health and Human Services led the state to spend $180 million more than necessary to administer the program.

In 2017 the auditor's office found that the North Carolina Department of Agriculture and Consumer Services had not penalized some dairies' milk gradings despite recurrent sanitation and pest control violations. The release of the audit led to a public dispute between Wood and Commissioner of Agriculture Steve Troxler, who disputed the report's findings, accused Wood of undermining dairy farmers, and asserted that she had publicly presented the audit more severely than her staff had communicated to the agriculture department. Wood countered by accusing the department of failing to follow its own inspection procedures and suggested that it was struggling to balance its responsibilities regarding both the regulation and promotion of agricultural products.

In May 2020 the auditor's office released a critical review of the financial management of the city of Rocky Mount, finding that a city councilman had used his office to suppress attempts by municipal workers to collect outstanding utility bills he owed. In response, a state senator filed a bill meant to address local government corruption concerns. The NAACP and the city councilman named in the report denounced the audit and the legislation as racist attempts to thwart the political power of black citizens in the city. Wood defended the audit, saying, "Everything we have in our reports is backed by evidence [...] I am going to do my job. I don't care about the age, the race, the color, or the political party. I don't care." The bill was passed into law in December 2021.

=== Car crash ===
On December 8, 2022, Wood struck a parked car with a state owned vehicle in downtown Raleigh and failed to report the incident to the authorities or car owner, leaving the scene on foot and abandoning her vehicle with the engine running. Four days later she was charged with misdemeanor hit and run, property damage, and unsafe movement. She released a statement on January 23, 2023, admitting to "personal responsibility" for striking the vehicle and leaving the scene. The North Carolina Republican Party formally called for her resignation, while several leading Republican and Democratic officials bemoaned the incident but avoided directly asking for her departure.

Wood later reimbursed the state and the owner of the other car for the damages and towing costs incurred, saying in a statement on February 28, "[A]ll I can do moving forward is take responsibility for the accident and fix what was broken. The accident does not define me, nor does it take away from the phenomenal work we've done in my administration." On March 24, she pled guilty to the hit and run charge and was sentenced to pay a $100 fine and court fees. The unsafe movement citation was dropped. She admitted to the court that she had drunk two glasses of wine before the accident but insisted that she was not impaired.

Wood announced in November 2023 that she would not seek reelection to the auditor's office in the 2024 elections. After being indicted on a misdemeanor charge of misusing a state-issue vehicle, Wood announced that she would resign as state auditor effective December 15, 2023. She was replaced by Jessica Holmes via gubernatorial appointment on December 16. Wood later criticized the selection of Holmes, stating that her chief deputy in the auditor's office was better qualified to run the agency until the next election.

== Later career ==
After leaving the auditor's office, Wood became the director of rural government services at an accounting firm.

== Electoral history ==
North Carolina Auditor Democratic primary election, 2008
Party	Candidate	Votes	%
Democratic	Beth Wood	801,308	64.48
Democratic	Fred Aikens	441,411	35.52

North Carolina Auditor Election, 2008
Party	Candidate	Votes	%
Democratic	Beth Wood	2,175,242	53.57
Republican	Leslie Merritt (inc.)	1,885,229	46.43

North Carolina Auditor Election, 2012
Party	Candidate	Votes	%
Democratic	Beth Wood (inc.)	2,299,541	53.71
Republican	Debra Goldman	1,981,539	46.29

North Carolina Auditor Election, 2016
Party	Candidate	Votes	%
Democratic	Beth Wood (inc.)	2,259,436	50.07
Republican	Chuck Stuber	2,253,394	49.93

North Carolina Auditor Election, 2020
Party	Candidate	Votes	%
Democratic	Beth Wood (inc.)	2,730,175	50.88
Republican	Anthony Wayne Street	2,635,825	49.12

== Works cited ==
- Eamon, Tom (2014). The Making of a Southern Democracy: North Carolina Politics from Kerr Scott to Pat McCrory. UNC Press Books. ISBN 9781469606972. - See profile at Google Books
- North Carolina Manual (PDF). Raleigh: North Carolina Department of the Secretary of State. 2011. OCLC 2623953. Archived from the original (PDF) on August 2, 2023.

Party political offices
Preceded by Ralph Campbell Jr.	Democratic nominee for North Carolina State Auditor; 2008, 2012, 2016, 2020	Succeeded by Jessica Holmes
Political offices
Preceded by Les Merritt	Auditor of North Carolina; 2009–2023	Succeeded by Jessica Holmes
