= 2020 North Carolina elections =

- November 3, 2020

A general election was held in the U.S. state of North Carolina on November 3, 2020.

To vote by mail, registered North Carolina voters had to request a ballot by October 27, 2020.

== Federal offices ==
=== President of the United States ===
North Carolina has 15 electoral votes in the Electoral College. Nominees for the presidential election included Donald Trump (R), Joe Biden (D), and Jo Jorgensen (L), with incumbent president Trump winning the state's electors.

=== United States Senate ===
Thom Tillis (R, incumbent), Cal Cunningham (D), Kevin E. Hayes (C), and Shannon Bray (L) ran for office in the general election of North Carolina, with incumbent Tillis winning a second term.

=== United States House of Representatives ===
North Carolina voted for 13 U.S. Representatives, one from each of the state's 13 congressional districts.

U.S. House of Representatives nominees by district
District	Democratic nominee	Republican nominee	Independent nominee	Libertarian nominee	Constitution nominee	Green nominee
District 1	G. K. Butterfield, incumbent	Sandy Smith				
District 2	Deborah Ross	Alan Swain		Jeff Matemu		
District 3	Daryl Farrow	Gregory Murphy, incumbent				
District 4	David Price, incumbent	Robert Thomas				
District 5	David Wilson Brown	Virginia Foxx, incumbent			Jeff Gregory	
District 6	Kathy Manning	Joseph Lee Haywood				
District 7	Christopher Ward	David Rouzer, incumbent	Theresa Everett			
District 8	Patricia Timmons-Goodson	Richard Hudson, incumbent				
District 9	Cynthia Wallace	Dan Bishop, incumbent				
District 10	David Parker	Patrick T. McHenry, incumbent				
District 11	Morris Davis	Madison Cawthorn		Tracey DeBruhl		Tamara Zwinak
District 12	Alma Adams, incumbent					
District 13	Scott Huffman	Ted Budd, incumbent				

== State offices ==
=== Executive offices ===
North Carolina is one of 11 states that held elections for governor in the 2020 general election. Roy Cooper (D, incumbent) ran against Dan Forest (R), Al Pisano (C), and Steven DiFiore II (L), and won a second term.

Other executive offices up for election in the general election included lieutenant governor, attorney general, secretary of state, treasurer, superintendent of public instruction, auditor, commissioner of agriculture, commissioner of labor, and commissioner of insurance.

=== Legislature ===
The outcome of this election affected partisan balance during post-census redistricting.

==== State senate ====
All 50 seats within the North Carolina Senate were up for election in the general election, with the Democrats making a net gain of one.

==== State House of Representatives ====
All 120 seats within the state's House of Representatives were up for election in the general election, with the Republicans making a four-seat net gain but still falling short of a "veto-proof" 3/5 supermajority.

== North Carolina ballot measures ==
There were no statewide ballot measures on the ballot in the general election; however, there were local measures for voters in Guilford County, Mecklenburg County, and Wake County.

== See also ==
- Electoral reform in North Carolina
- North Carolina State Board of Elections
- Political party strength in North Carolina
- Politics of North Carolina
- Elections in North Carolina
