= State constitutional officer =

Leadership position in a state government of the United States

In the United States, each state and territory has constitutional officers who lead the state governments of the United States. These officers may be elected or appointed, depending on the position. The number and powers of state constitutional officers varies from state to state, based on the constitution and statutes of each state. State constitutional officers may reside in the executive or legislative branch, while state constitutions also establish the judicial system of the state, including state supreme courts.

== Executive offices ==
The governor of each state heads the executive branch and, depending on the individual jurisdiction, may have considerable control over government budgeting, the power of appointment of many officials, and a considerable role in legislation. The governor may also have additional roles, such as that of commander-in-chief of the state's National Guard, and in many states and territories the governor has partial or absolute power to commute or pardon a criminal sentence.

45 of the 50 states have a lieutenant governor who stands in for the governor when the governor is absent from the state or temporarily incapacitated. In most cases, the lieutenant governor ascends to the position of governor after the death or resignation of the governor, but in some states the lieutenant governor becomes an acting governor. In many states, the lieutenant governor has few official powers, similar to the United States Vice President. However, some lieutenant governors do have significant responsibilities. In Texas, the lieutenant governor has numerous powers over the legislative process, particularly in the senate.

Every state has an attorney general, who is the chief legal advisor to the state government and the state's chief law enforcement officer, analogous to the United States Attorney General. 43 of the states directly elect their attorney general, while the others are selected by the governor, legislature, or state supreme court. Attorneys general often have wide discretion in what cases to prosecute and how to settle cases. State attorneys general can often make an impact even beyond their state, taking part in major challenges to federal laws and prosecuting major national companies. In many states, the attorney general is arguably the second most powerful constitutional officer, after the governor.

Every state has a state treasurer, or an equivalent, who serves as the chief custodian of each state's treasury, and is the state's head banker. Typically, the treasurer receives and deposits state money, manages investments, and keeps track of budget surpluses and deficits. The position has powers and responsibilities similar to those of the United States Secretary of the Treasury and the Treasurer of the United States. 39 of the 50 states popularly elect the treasurer, while the other 11 treasurers are appointed by the governor or elected by the legislature. Texas and New York do not have treasurers, but do have state comptrollers who perform similar functions and are part of the National Association of State Treasurers. Some states elect both a state treasurer and a state comptroller. In Illinois, for example, the treasurer invests the public funds, while the comptroller writes the checks to cover the state's expenses.

47 of the 50 states have a secretary of state. 35 of those states popularly elect the secretary of the state, while in the other states either the governor appoints or the legislature elects the secretary of state. Because the foreign policy of the United States is handled at the federal level, the duties of the position are very different from those of the United States Secretary of State. In many states, the secretary of state is the chief elections officer. Other duties vary from state to state.

=== Other elected officers ===
Various other constitutional offices also exist. Every state has a state auditor, who performs audits to ensure that government money is spent properly. Some states, such as Colorado and Michigan, elect the regents of state universities in statewide elections. Some states, such as Florida, elect an agriculture commissioner, who oversees the state department of agriculture. In addition to other offices, North Carolina elects a commissioner of labor, commissioner of insurance, and superintendent of public instruction. Texas elects a land commissioner, who oversees use of state-controlled land.

Some states have positions that are not elected on a statewide basis, but rather by state districts. The Massachusetts Governor's Council consists of eight officials elected from eight districts. The council has power over appointments and other issues. The Mississippi Public Service Commission regulates utilities in the state of Mississippi. Its members are elected from three districts across the state.

=== Appointed offices ===
Many state constitutions establish appointed positions. For example, the Constitution of California establishes the California Public Utilities Commission to regulate public utilities. Board members are appointed by the governor to six-year terms. The Constitution of New Jersey establishes a secretary of state and attorney general, both appointed by the governor, while the Constitution of Michigan establishes an appointed state treasurer. However, most appointed positions are specifically established by statute or executive order.

== Legislative offices ==
Similar to the United States Constitution, the constitution of each state may require that the legislature choose officers. For example, Article II of the Pennsylvania Constitution requires that the Senate elect a President pro tempore, who presides over the senate when the Lieutenant Governor is absent, and that the House of Representatives elect a Speaker. In contrast, Article V of the Montana Constitution only requires that each house choose its own officers from among members of that house. In many states, such as Texas, the lieutenant governor fills a dual role as an executive officer and as the presiding officer of the senate.

== Other offices ==
Some states do not define judges as "officers", but regardless, all state constitutions establish a judicial system, including a state supreme court. Some state constitutions, like Maryland, allow judges to appoint officers of the court as necessary. Some state constitutions establish other offices. The Constitution of Virginia requires each county and city to elect a treasurer, sheriff, state's attorney, clerk, and commissioner of revenue. Conversely, Article 10 of the Constitution of Ohio does not establish any offices, but does allow for such offices to be established by statute. The Constitution of Maryland establishes the Baltimore City Council and the office of Mayor of Baltimore.

== Collective duties ==
The relative power of the state constitutional officers varies from state to state. In Florida, major executive decisions are not made by the governor alone, but rather by a vote of the four members of the Florida Cabinet. This creates, in effect, a "plural executive." New Hampshire has an executive council that performs many of the duties usually performed by governors. The North Carolina Council of State, made up of the state's executive constitutional officers, does not make major executive decisions as in Florida, but does have control over state land. In most other states, such as California, ultimate executive power is vested in the governor alone, although other state constitutional officers still have their own powers and duties. Strong state cabinets can provide checks and balances on the governor. On the other hand, divided power can also prevent major reforms from occurring.

In some states, such as Ohio, state constitutional officers play a major role in redistricting. In some states, including North Carolina, the statewide elected officials are not a part of the cabinet, which is instead composed of gubernatorial appointees.

== Statewide elections ==
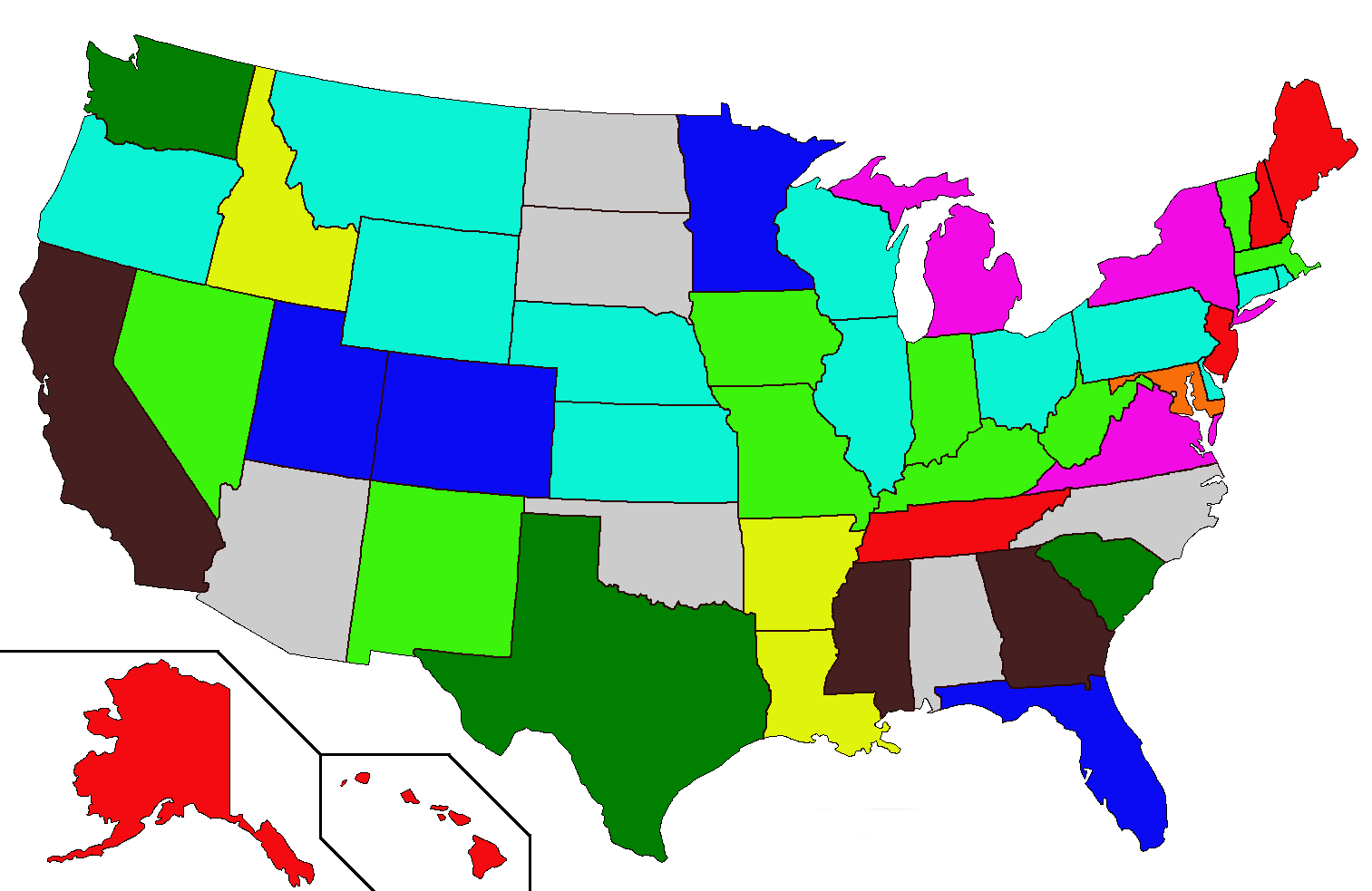
The number of officials directly elected by the entire voting population of the state, not including judges, lieutenant governors elected on the same ticket as the governor, and federal offices One statewide election (Note: Six states: Alaska, Hawaii, Maine, New Hampshire, New Jersey and Tennessee) Two statewide elections (Note: One state: Maryland) Three statewide elections (Note: Three states: Michigan, New York and Virginia) Four statewide elections (Note: Four states: Colorado, Florida, Minnesota and Utah) Five statewide elections (Note: Twelve states: Connecticut, Delaware, Illinois, Kansas, Montana, Nebraska, Ohio, Oregon, Pennsylvania, Rhode Island, Wisconsin and Wyoming) Six statewide elections (Note: Nine states: Indiana, Iowa, Kentucky, Massachusetts, Missouri, Nevada, New Mexico, Vermont and West Virginia) Seven statewide elections (Note: Three states: Arkansas, Idaho and Louisiana) Eight statewide elections (Note: Three states: California, Georgia and Mississippi) Nine statewide elections (Note: Three states: South Carolina, Texas and Washington) Ten or more statewide elections (Note: Six states: Alabama, Arizona, North Carolina, North Dakota, Oklahoma and South Dakota)

All states except Louisiana hold their statewide elections on the first Tuesday following the first Monday in November. Many states, such as Virginia and North Carolina, elect all constitutional officers concurrently to four-year terms. In other states, such as Texas, officials are elected at different times to terms of varying lengths. In Vermont and New Hampshire, constitutional officers are elected to two year terms. In some states, such as Nevada, some or all constitutional officers have term limits. Depending on state law, many officials can be recalled. In roughly half of the states with the position, the lieutenant governor is elected separately from the governor. In the other half of the states, the lieutenant governor is elected jointly with the governor. In some states, the lieutenant governor nominees are chosen separately in the primary but run jointly with gubernatorial nominees in the general election.

The number of constitutional officers and elections varies greatly from state to state. New Jersey only has one statewide election, choosing a governor and lieutenant governor on the same ticket. North Carolina, on the other hand, elects ten different constitutional officers. Including judges, Texas elects 29 different officials in statewide elections. In many states, the lower offices serve as launching pads for higher offices. In some states, if a statewide elected official other than the governor dies or resigns, the governor can appoint a replacement. However, this power may be limited; in Utah, the governor has to choose from a list of three candidates provided by the party that last held the office.

== See also ==
- Comparison of U.S. state and territory governments
- County constitutional officer
- State constitution (United States)
- State court (United States)
- State governments of the United States
- State legislature (United States)
- State supreme court (United States)
- List of U.S. statewide elected officials
