= Les Merritt =

American accountant and politician from North Carolina

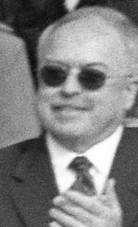
- Merritt in 2005

16th Auditor of North Carolina
- In office January 15, 2005 – January 10, 2009
- Governor: Mike Easley
- Preceded by: Ralph Campbell Jr.
- Succeeded by: Beth Wood

Member of the Wake County Board of Commissioners from the 1st district
- In office December 5, 1994 – December 7, 1998
- Preceded by: Thurston Debnam Jr.
- Succeeded by: Linda Coleman

Personal details
- Born: November 19, 1951 (age 74) Sampson County, North Carolina
- Party: Republican
- Children: 2
- Education: North Carolina State University (BS)
- Occupation: Accountant

Leslie Merritt Jr. (born November 19, 1951) is an American accountant and politician. A Republican, he served as the State Auditor of North Carolina from January 15, 2005 to January 10, 2009. Merrit was born in Sampson County. After graduating from college and marrying he moved to Zebulon and ran an accounting firm. He served on the Wake County Board of Commissioners from 1994 to 1998. He ran for the office of State Auditor of North Carolina in 2000 and lost, but was elected four years later. He lost a reelection bid four years later.

== Early life ==
Leslie Merritt was born on November 19, 1951 in Sampson County, North Carolina, United States. He graduated from Union High School in 1970 and earned a Bachelor of Science in economics and accounting at North Carolina State University. He married and had two children. Following his marriage and the completion of his college degree, he and his wife moved to Zebulon. In 1984 he became owner of an accounting firm, Merritt, Petway, Mills and Hockaday, managing it until 2004.

== Political career ==
=== Wake County Board of Commissioners ===
Merritt, a member of the Republican Party, ran for a seat on the Wake County Board of Commissioners in 1994, defeating Democrat Thurston Debnam Jr. He served on the commission from December 5, 1994 to 1998.

=== State Auditor of North Carolina ===
Merrit challenged Democratic incumbent Ralph Campbell Jr. in the 2000 election for the office of North Carolina State Auditor. Campbell collected a significant amount of his campaign contributions from Atlanta-area donors, where his brother Bill was serving as mayor. Merritt, attempted to tie Ralph Campbell to a federal corruption investigation into Atlanta's city government and turned over his campaign financial disclosures to the Federal Bureau of Investigation. Campbell won over Merritt in November with 51 percent of the vote. Merritt ran again in 2004, receiving about 28,000 more votes Campbell and winning the election.

Merritt assumed the office of State Auditor of North Carolina on January 15, 2005. He was the first Certified Public Accountant to serve as State Auditor of North Carolina. Shortly after he took office, North Carolina Senate Majority Leader Tony Rand, fearing that Merrit would seek out legislators' emails, filed a bill that barred the auditor's office from accessing legislature computers. Two Democrats in the North Carolina House of Representatives subsequently introduced a bill which prohibited the office from accessing any state government computers and assigned their responsibility to the state chief technology officer. The Democratic legislators denied the move was politically-motivated, though some Republican members of the General Assembly believed such. Merritt attributed the proposals to misunderstandings, saying, "I've got to get to know them, and they've got to get to know me". He opposed the latter measure, saying the technology officer could not conduct an independent audit of state computers since they were appointed by the governor. He also began an audit into the North Carolina Division of Motor Vehicles to investigate the strength of its driver's license application process, and declared his support for the adoption of the Taxpayer Bill of Rights and zero-based budgeting for all state agencies.

In 2007 Merritt convinced the Senate to delay passage of a measure which would permit citizens to register to vote and cast a ballot immediately before an election, citing a risk of voter fraud. The State Board of Elections denounced his warnings as flawed and Merritt yielded. He later said, "I think there was a better way to handle that. It wasn't partisan, but it sure did lead into some accusations." He objected to the complete privatization of the state's mental health care network, saying "It should have been a pilot program. [...] We have to go back and build that safety net." In 2008 Merritt began a public dispute with the North Carolina State Ethics Commission over its handling of investigations into Lieutenant Governor Bev Perdue and State Senator Martin Nesbitt, accusing the body of giving the two preferential treatment. The General Assembly ended the feud by passing legislation which limited the auditor's purview concerning ethics disclosures. His office later found that Perdue and State Treasurer Richard Moore had misused official resources to support their own political campaigns.

On October 31, 2008, Merritt delivered an audit of various overseas trips First Lady of North Carolina Mary Easley. The trips cost $110,000 and were intended to secure art loans and promote cultural exchange. Merritt found that $45,000 of the overseas charges were "unreasonable" and of minimal benefit to the state. The audit was released days before the 2008 state elections, leading Merritt's opponent, Democrat Beth Wood, to accuse him of politicizing his office. She defeated him in November by over 290,000 votes. Political observers were surprised by Merritt's defeat. He left office on January 10, 2009.

=== Later activities ===
In February 2009, Merritt formed an investment consulting firm, Merritt Wealth Strategies, with his son. From May 2009 to April 2011, Merritt served as the executive director of the Foundation For Ethics in Public Service, a conservative organization that sought to promote ethical standards for public officials. On January 1, 2013, he was appointed to the North Carolina State Ethics Commission by Senate President Pro Tem Phil Berger. On May 13, he was contracted by the North Carolina Department of Health and Human Services to serve as chief financial officer for the state Division of Mental Health, Developmental Disabilities and Substance Abuse Services. After journalists from WRAL-TV questioned whether this created a conflict of interest, Merritt resigned from the ethics commission.

=== Electoral history ===
==== 2008 ====
North Carolina State Auditor general election, 2008
| Party | Candidate | Votes | % |
|---|---|---|---|
| Democratic | Beth Wood | 2,175,242 | 53.57% |
| Republican | Les Merritt (incumbent) | 1,885,229 | 46.43% |
| Total votes | | 4,060,471 | 100% |
| Democratic gain from Republican | | | |

==== 2004 ====
North Carolina State Auditor Republican primary election, 2004
| Party | Candidate | Votes | % |
|---|---|---|---|
| Republican | Les Merritt | 190,408 | 66.83% |
| Republican | Jasper Albright | 94,512 | 33.17% |
| Total votes | | 284,920 | 100% |

North Carolina State Auditor general election, 2004
| Party | Candidate | Votes | % |
|---|---|---|---|
| Republican | Les Merritt | 1,662,354 | 50.44% |
| Democratic | Ralph Campbell Jr. (incumbent) | 1,633,639 | 49.56% |
| Total votes | | 3,295,993 | 100% |
| Republican gain from Democratic | | | |

==== 2000 ====
North Carolina State Auditor general election, 2000
| Party | Candidate | Votes | % |
|---|---|---|---|
| Democratic | Ralph Campbell Jr. (incumbent) | 1,392,211 | 50.51% |
| Republican | Les Merritt | 1,363,890 | 49.49% |
| Total votes | | 2,756,101 | 100% |
| Democratic hold | | | |

==== 1998 ====
Wake County Board of Commissioners 1st district general election, 1998
| Party | Candidate | Votes | % |
|---|---|---|---|
| Democratic | Linda Coleman | 86,074 | 50.39% |
| Republican | Les Merritt (incumbent) | 84,746 | 49.61% |
| Total votes | | 170,820 | 100% |
| Democratic gain from Republican | | | |

==== 1994 ====
Wake County Board of Commissioners 1st district general election, 1994
| Party | Candidate | Votes | % |
|---|---|---|---|
| Republican | Les Merritt | 63,816 | 58.01% |
| Democratic | Thurston Debnam Jr. (incumbent) | 46,188 | 41.99% |
| Total votes | | 110,004 | 100% |
| Republican gain from Democratic | | | |

== Works cited ==
- Eamon, Tom (2014). The Making of a Southern Democracy: North Carolina Politics from Kerr Scott to Pat McCrory. UNC Press Books. ISBN 9781469606972. - See profile at Google Books
- North Carolina Manual 2007–2008. Raleigh: North Carolina Secretary of State. 2008. OCLC 591148963.

Party political offices
| Preceded by Jack Daly | Republican nominee for North Carolina State Auditor; 2000, 2004, 2008 | Succeeded by Debra Goldman |
Political offices
| Preceded by Ralph Campbell Jr. | Auditor of North Carolina; 2005–2009 | Succeeded by Beth Wood |
