= The Making of a Southern Democracy =

2014 book by Tom Eamon

The Making of a Southern Democracy: North Carolina Politics from Kerr Scott to Pat McCrory is a 2014 non-fiction book by Tom Eamon, published by University of North Carolina Press.

It documents the political developments between World War II and the time the book was published.

== Background ==
The author works at East Carolina University and has the rank associate professor.

== Reception ==
Patrick Andelic of the University of Oxford stated that the book is "a thorough and well-documented survey" even though it makes no thesis statement. Andelic argued that, compared to the elections documented in this book, the film The Campaign, which is a fictional account of North Carolina politics, was "ultimately a good deal less interesting".

Bryan Thrift of Johnston Community College stated that the author "succeeds masterfully" at the stated goal. Thrift praised the "thorough" researching, and stated that the "primary strength" is how the work analyzes the political developments of the state, though Thrift argues that the book also has "vivid, engaging stories".

== See also ==
- Politics of North Carolina
- Kerr Scott
- Pat McCrory
