= Jessica Holmes (politician) =

American attorney and politician from North Carolina

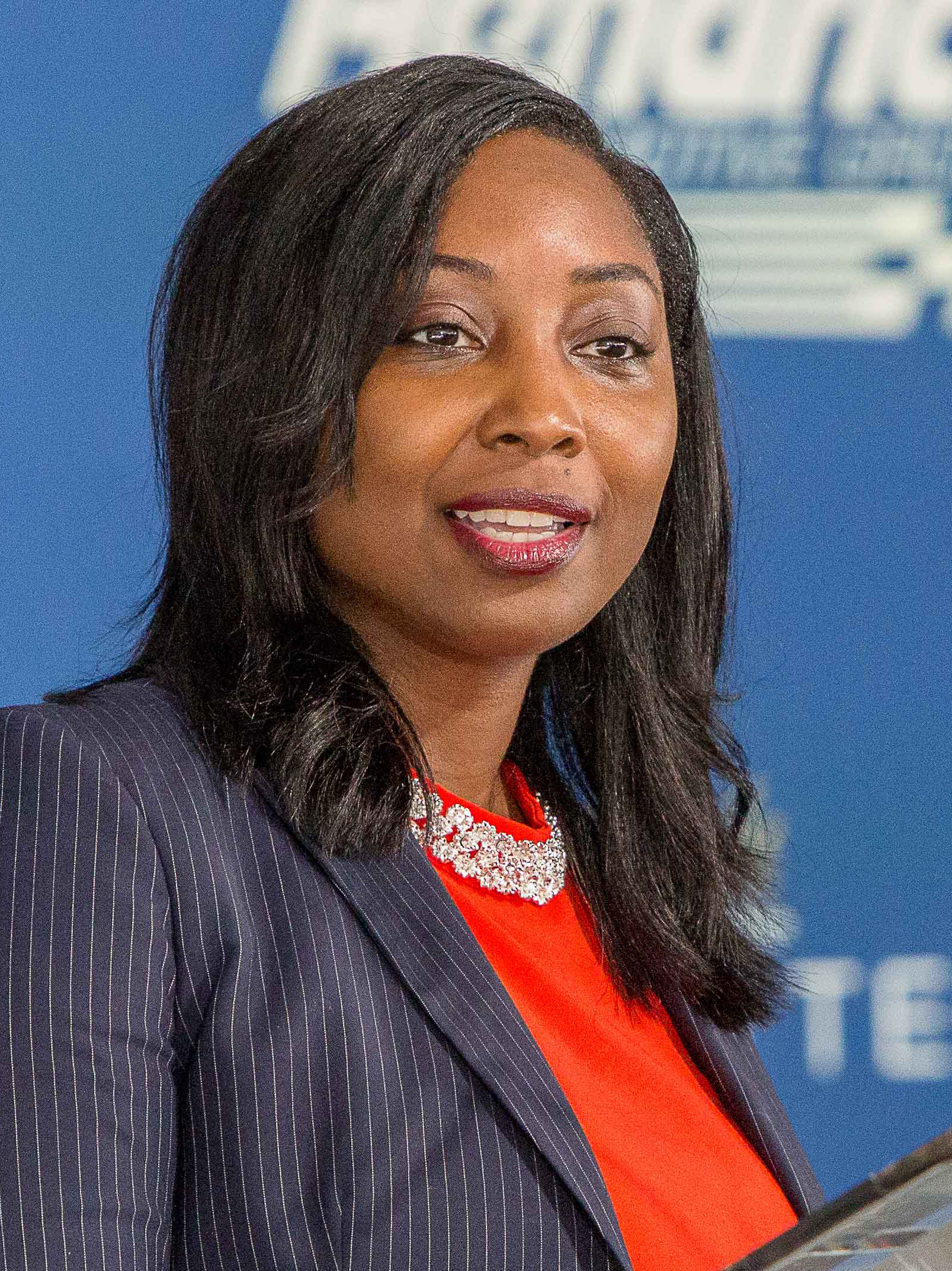
- Holmes in 2019

18th Auditor of North Carolina
- In office December 16, 2023 – December 31, 2024
- Governor: Roy Cooper
- Preceded by: Beth Wood
- Succeeded by: Dave Boliek

Chair of the Wake County Board of Commissioners
- In office December 4, 2017 – December 2, 2019
- Preceded by: Sig Hutchinson
- Succeeded by: Greg Ford

Member of the Wake County Board of Commissioners from the 3rd district
- In office December 1, 2014 – December 7, 2020
- Preceded by: Rich Gianni
- Succeeded by: Maria Cervania

Personal details
- Born: 1983 or 1984 (age 41–42) Pender County, North Carolina, U.S.
- Party: Democratic
- Education: University of North Carolina, Chapel Hill (BA, JD)

Jessica Holmes (born 1983/1984) is an American attorney and politician who served as the 18th North Carolina State Auditor from 2023 to 2024, having filled the vacancy caused by the resignation of Beth Wood.

== Early life and education ==
Jessica Holmes grew up in Pender County, North Carolina. She was the eldest of five of her mother's children. During her early youth her mother found infrequent work at a meatpacking plant, and the family struggled with homelessness. Holmes graduated from Pender County High School in 2002. She earned an undergraduate degree from the University of North Carolina at Chapel Hill in 2006, and later received a Juris Doctor degree from the same school.

== Political career ==
Holmes was sworn in to her seat on the Wake County Board of Commissioners on December 1, 2014. She was unanimously elected chair of the board on December 4, 2017. On December 6, 2017, she announced her intention to resign from the board to accept a job offer, but rescinded her announcement the following day, citing complaints from constituents.

In 2020, Holmes ran for the office of North Carolina Commissioner of Labor as a Democrat, losing to Republican Josh Dobson. In August 2021, she was appointed to the North Carolina Industrial Commission as a deputy commissioner.

In November 2023, Governor Roy Cooper announced Holmes as his pick to finish the term of State Auditor Beth Wood, who resigned, effective mid-December. Holmes was sworn in on December 16. Holmes was the first Black woman to serve on the North Carolina Council of State.

Holmes ran for a full term in the 2024 elections. She lost to Republican Dave Boliek.

== Electoral history ==
=== 2024 ===
North Carolina State Auditor general election, 2024
Party	Candidate	Votes	%
Republican	Dave Boliek	2,729,780	49.35%
Democratic	Jessica Holmes (incumbent)	2,633,607	47.61%
Libertarian	Bob Drach	167,701	2.44%
Total votes		5,531,088	100%
Republican gain from Democratic			

=== 2020 ===
North Carolina Commissioner of Labor general election, 2020
Party	Candidate	Votes	%
Republican	Josh Dobson	2,726,619	50.83%
Democratic	Jessica Holmes	2,637,528	49.17%
Total votes		5,364,147	100%
Republican hold			

=== 2018 ===
Wake County Board of Commissioners 3rd district general election, 2018
Party	Candidate	Votes	%
Democratic	Jessica Holmes (incumbent)	299,695	100%
Total votes		299,695	100%
Democratic hold			

=== 2014 ===
Wake County Board of Commissioners 3rd district general election, 2014
Party	Candidate	Votes	%
Democratic	Jessica Holmes	176,754	56.35%
Republican	Rich Gianni (incumbent)	136,903	43.65%
Total votes		313,657	100%
Democratic gain from Republican			

Party political offices
Preceded by Charles Meeker	Democratic nominee for Labor Commissioner of North Carolina; 2020	Succeeded by Braxton Winston
Preceded by Beth Wood	Democratic nominee for Auditor of North Carolina; 2024	Most recent
Political offices
Preceded by Beth Wood	Auditor of North Carolina; 2023–2025	Succeeded by Dave Boliek
