= North Carolina State Auditor =

Auditor of the U.S. state of North Carolina

State Auditor of North Carolina

- Incumbent; Dave Boliek since January 1, 2025
- Office of State Auditor
- Member of: Council of State; Local Government Commission
- Seat: Raleigh, North Carolina
- Term length: Four years; Not term limited
- Constituting instrument: North Carolina Constitution of 1868
- Precursor: Auditor of Public Accounts
- Inaugural holder: Henderson Adams
- Formation: 1868
- Succession: Fifth
- Salary: US$168,384 annually
- Website: auditor.nc.gov

The state auditor of North Carolina is a statewide elected office in the U.S. state of North Carolina. The state auditor is a constitutional officer responsible for overseeing and reviewing the financial accounts of all state government agencies. The auditor also conducts performance audits of state agencies, ensures state agencies' accounting conforms with Generally Accepted Accounting Principles, evaluates the integrity of computer-generated information, and investigates the misuse of state funds or property. The incumbent is Dave Boliek, who became state auditor on January 1, 2025.

Auditors have been employed by North Carolina's government since it was an English colony. The Office of Auditor of Public Accounts was created in 1862. Six years later it was replaced by the Office of State Auditor, filled by a candidate popularly elected every four years and not subject to term limits. The state auditor was responsible for several accounting and fiscal duties for much of the position's existence, though these were assigned elsewhere in the 20th century. The state auditor leads the Department of State Auditor and sits on the North Carolina Council of State.

== History of the office ==
The Fundamental Constitutions of Carolina, adopted on March 1, 1669, for the Province of Carolina, provided for twelve auditors to maintain various accounts, but there is no evidence that the offices were ever brought into use. Over the following decades, boards of auditors were appointed by the North Carolina General Assembly and the King of England's comptrollers to attend to matters in various localities as stipulated by the English crown. In 1782 the General Assembly appointed Richard Caswell as the Comptroller of the State of North Carolina, responsible for the maintenance of public accounts. The assembly also established ten boards of auditors for different areas of the state.

In 1862 the General Assembly altered the previous system by establishing the Office of Auditor of Public Accounts, who was to be elected every two years by the legislature. The auditor was responsible for receiving, auditing, and adjusting all accounts or claims against the state and reporting these activities to the comptroller. The post was abolished in 1865. The North Carolina Constitution of 1868 created the Office of State Auditor, superseding the auditor of public accounts and abolishing the post of comptroller. (Note: The office of comptroller, or controller, was later recreated in 1985 to manage various state financial systems.) The auditor was to "superintend the fiscal affairs of the State; examine and settle accounts of persons indebted to the State; liquidate claims by persons against the State; and to draw warrants on the State Treasurer for moneys to be paid out of the treasury." The document also moved the office out of the legislative branch of government and into the executive branch, stipulating that its holder was to be popularly elected every four years.

The auditor's original duties included writing an annual report on state revenue and spending—including projections for the following fiscal year, maintaining general accounts of the state, recommending improvements to state fiscal management, settling claims against the state and its own claims against persons, certifying treasury balances, and issuing warrants for treasury disbursements. In 1872 the auditor was made responsible for compiling local tax lists for county sheriffs to aid in their collection and ascertaining that sheriffs properly collected. The office was relieved of these responsibilities in 1923. In 1921 the General Assembly empowered the auditor to audit and adjust public accounts and tasked them with overseeing all state accounting systems. In 1955 the assembly transferred the general accounting duties and responsibility for treasury disbursement warrants to the Budget Bureau. In 1971 North Carolina adopted a new constitution which altered the office little, though the Executive Organization Act of 1971 created the Department of State Auditor. In 1974 the General Assembly authorized the state auditor to conduct operational audits of state agencies.

In 2024 the Assembly assigned the auditor the responsibility of appointing the members of the North Carolina State Board of Elections, effective May 2025. The legislation also gave the auditor the power to appoint county boards of elections chairs. The law is currently undergoing litigation.

Ralph Campbell Jr., sworn in to the office of state auditor in 1993, was the first black person ever elected to a statewide executive office in North Carolina. During his tenure he equipped auditing staff with computers. Les Merritt, who assumed office in 2005, was the first Certified Public Accountant to serve as state auditor. Beth Wood, sworn in 2009, was the first woman to hold the office. Jessica Holmes, sworn in during 2023, was the first black woman to hold the office. The incumbent, Dave Boliek, was sworn in on January 1, 2025.

== Powers, duties, and structure ==
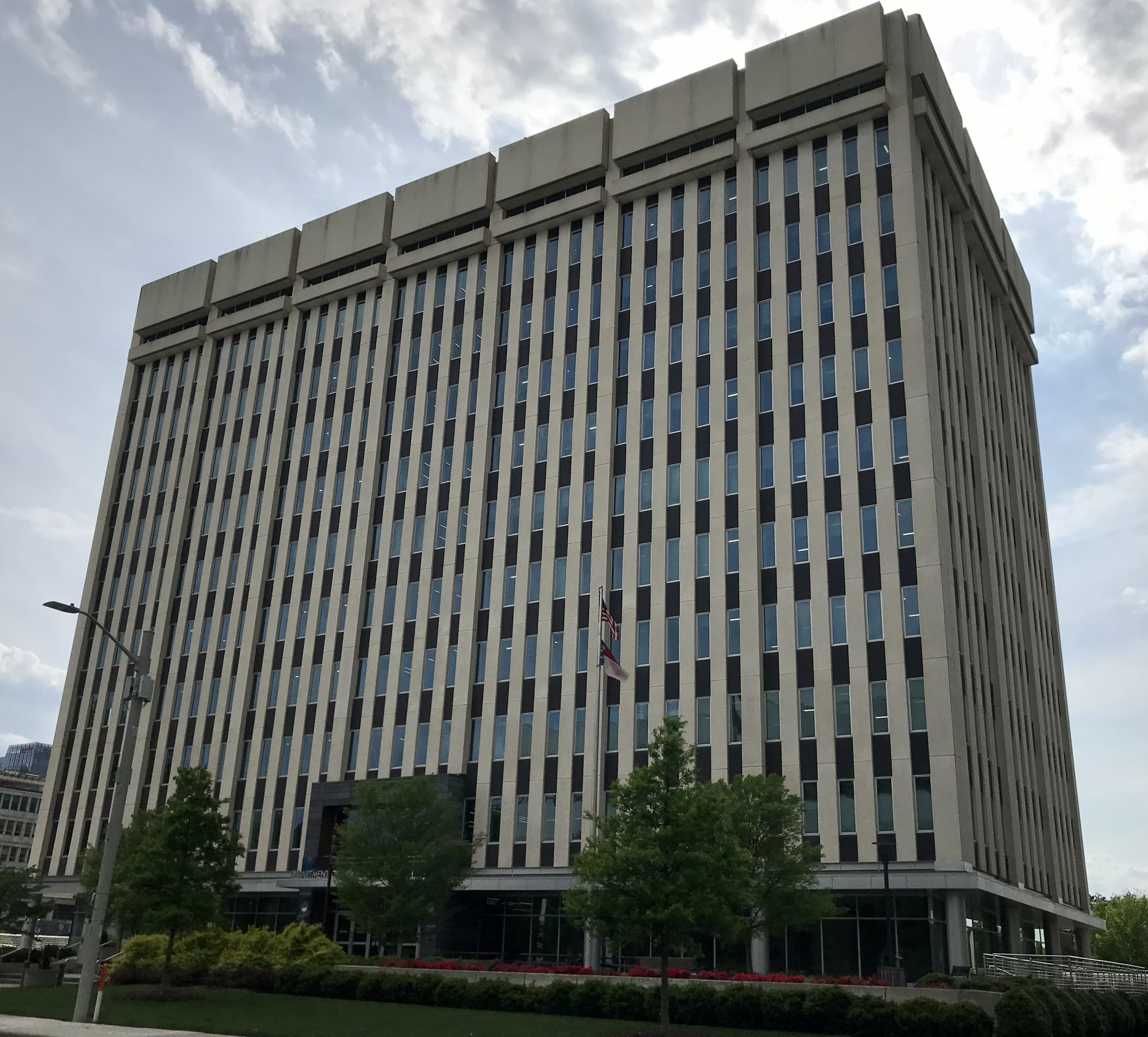
The Albemarle Building in Raleigh houses the offices of the state auditor.

The state auditor is a constitutional officer. Article III, Section 7, of the Constitution of North Carolina stipulates the popular election of the state auditor every four years. Unlike most of the 18 other states with an elected auditor, North Carolina does not require candidates for the office to be Certified Public Accountants. The office holder is not subject to term limits. In the event of a vacancy in the office, the Governor of North Carolina has the authority to appoint a successor until a candidate is elected at the next general election for members of the General Assembly. Per Article III, Section 8 of the constitution, the auditor sits on the Council of State. The auditor is ex officio a member of the Local Government Commission, the Capital Facilities Finance Agency, the Debt Affordability Advisory Committee, and several other bodies. They are a nonvoting member of the Office of State Budget and Management's Council of Internal Auditing. They are fifth in line of succession to the governor. As with all Council of State officers, the auditor's salary is fixed by the General Assembly and cannot be reduced during their term of office. As of 2025, the auditor's annual salary is $168,384.

The state auditor leads the Office of the State Auditor. The department is split into a general administration division and an auditing division. The former division is led by the state auditor's chief deputy and handles administrative concerns including personnel matters, internal budgeting and procurement, and intra-department coordination. The latter division is headed by a deputy state auditor and several audit managers and is responsible for conducting audits. As of June 2024, the department has 120 employees. The department is headquartered in the Albemarle Building in downtown Raleigh. It also maintains offices in Pitt, New Hanover, Forsyth, and Buncombe counties.

Article V, Chapter 147 of the North Carolina General Statutes grants the state auditor broad authority to examine all documents and financial affairs of all state agencies. The official is also responsible for auditing federal grant programs in the state and can audit private entities which receive state funds. The state auditor works with the state controller to compile the state's annual comprehensive financial report and, as required by federal law, issues the Statewide Single Audit Report. The auditor's office performs various financial and technological audits and other investigations, including performance audits of state agencies, ensuring state agencies' accounting conformity with Generally Accepted Accounting Principles, evaluations of the integrity of computer-generated information, and inquiries into the misuse of state funds or property. The Department of State Auditor maintains a tip line to collect reports on government malfeasance and collects hundreds of such tips per year. It can conduct special investigations at the request of the General Assembly or the governor. The auditor is empowered to summon people to produce records and answer questions under oath, but does not have law enforcement powers and cannot bring criminal charges against individuals. The office does not conduct personal tax audits. The auditor can request advisory opinions on legal matters from the North Carolina attorney general.

== List of North Carolina state auditors ==
State Comptrollers of North Carolina
No.	Comptroller	Term in office	Source
1	Richard Caswell	1782 – 1785	
2	Francis Childs	1785 – 1792	
3	John Craven	1792 – 1808	
4	Samuel Goodwin	1808 – 1821	
5	Joseph Hawkins	1821 – 1827	
6	John L. Henderson	1827 – 1827	
7	James Grant	1827 – 1834	
8	Nathan A. Stedman	1834 – 1836	
9	William F. Collins	1836 – 1851	
10	William J. Clarke	1851 – 1855	
11	George W. Brooks	1855 – 1857	
12	Curtis H. Brogden	1857 – 1867	
12	S. W. Burgin	1867 – 1868	

Auditors of Public Accounts
No.	Auditor	Term in office	Source
1	Samuel F. Phillips	1862 – 1864	
2	Richard Henry Battle	1864 – 1865	

State Auditors of North Carolina
No.	Auditor	Term in office	Party	Source
1	Henderson Adams	1868 – 1873	Republican	
2	John Reilly	1873 – 1877	Republican	
3	Samuel L. Love	1877 – 1881	Democratic	
4	William P. Roberts	1881 – 1889	Democratic	
5	George W. Sanderlin	1889 – 1893	Democratic	
6	Robert M. Furman	1893 – 1897	Democratic	
7	Hal W. Ayer	1897 – 1901	Populist	
8	Benjamin F. Dixon	1901 – 1910	Democratic	
9	Benjamin F. Dixon Jr.	1910 – 1911	Democratic	
10	William P. Wood	1911 – 1921	Democratic	
11	Baxter Durham	1921 – 1937	Democratic	
12	George Ross Pou	1937 – 1947	Democratic	
13	Henry L. Bridges	1947 – 1981	Democratic	
14	Edward Renfrow	1981 – 1993	Democratic	
15	Ralph Campbell Jr.	1993 – 2005	Democratic	
16	Leslie W. Merritt Jr.	2005 – 2009	Republican	
17	Beth A. Wood	2009 – 2023	Democratic	
18	Jessica Holmes	2023 – 2024	Democratic	
19	Dave Boliek	2025 – present	Republican	

== Works cited ==
- Cheney, John L. Jr., ed. (1981). North Carolina Government, 1585-1979: A Narrative and Statistical History (revised ed.). Raleigh: North Carolina Secretary of State. OCLC 1290270510.
- North Carolina Manual (PDF). Raleigh: North Carolina Department of the Secretary of State. 2011. OCLC 2623953. Archived from the original (PDF) on 2023-08-02.
- Orth, John V.; Newby, Paul M. (2013). The North Carolina State Constitution (second ed.). Oxford University Press. ISBN 9780199300655.
