= 2024 North Carolina Superintendent of Public Instruction election =

- November 5, 2024
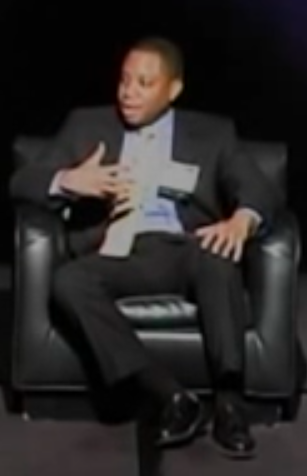
| Nominee | Mo Green | Michele Morrow |
| Party | Democratic | Republican |
| Popular vote | 2,837,606 | 2,706,953 |
| Percentage | 51.18% | 48.82% |
- Green: 50–60% 60–70% 70–80% 80–90% Morrow: 50–60% 60–70% 70–80%
Superintendent of Public Instruction before election
Catherine Truitt
Republican
Elected Superintendent of Public Instruction
Mo Green
Democratic

The 2024 North Carolina Superintendent of Public Instruction election was held on November 5, 2024, to elect the North Carolina Superintendent of Public Instruction, concurrently with elections for U.S. House of Representatives, governor, Council of State, and other state and local elections.

Primary elections took place on March 5, 2024. Incumbent Republican Superintendent Catherine Truitt ran for re-election to a second term in office, but was eliminated in the Republican primary. Democratic nominee Mo Green won the general election over Republican nominee Michele Morrow.

== Background ==
The North Carolina Superintendent of Public Instruction is one of the ten members of the North Carolina Council of State. All members of the council of state are elected for four-year terms statewide. The 2024 North Carolina elections were held on November 5, 2024, with primaries held on March 5, and primary runoffs, if necessary, on May 14.

Incumbent Republican Catherine Truitt, a teacher and former advisor on education to governor Pat McCrory, had first been elected as Superintendent in 2020, defeating Democratic nominee Jen Mangrum.

== Republican primary ==
Catherine Truitt, the incumbent superintendent elected in 2020, was challenged by Michele Morrow, a homeschool parent and property manager who ran unsuccessfully for Wake County Board of Education in 2022. Truitt, a former education advisor to governor Pat McCrory, had a nine-to-one fundraising lead. Truitt also had the support of high-ranking politicians in the state like U.S. Senator Thom Tillis, U.S. Representative Virginia Foxx, and state senator Phil Berger. Truitt was criticized by Morrow for recommending delayed implementation of a "Parents' Bill of Rights" law. Morrow portrayed Truitt as a liberal and herself as the "only conservative" in the race. Morrow was present at the January 6 United States Capitol attack but did not enter the Capitol building.

=== Nominee ===
- Michele Morrow, nurse and former homeschooling cooperative teacher

=== Eliminated in Primary ===
- Catherine Truitt, incumbent state superintendent

=== Results ===
Results by county Morrow: 50–60%; 60–70%; Truitt: 50–60%; 60–70%; 70–80%

Republican primary results
| Party | Candidate | Votes | % |
|---|---|---|---|
| Republican | Michele Morrow | 457,151 | 52.10% |
| Republican | Catherine Truitt (incumbent) | 420,270 | 47.90% |
| Total votes | | 877,421 | 100.0% |

== Democratic primary ==
=== Nominee ===
- Mo Green, former superintendent of Guilford County Schools, former deputy superintendent of Charlotte-Mecklenburg Schools

=== Eliminated in Primary ===
- Kenon Crumble, high school assistant principal
- Katie Eddings, personal finance college teacher

=== Polling ===
| Poll source | Date(s) administered | Sample size (Note: Key: A – all adults RV – registered voters LV – likely voters V – unclear) | Margin of error | Kenon Crumble | Katie Eddings | Mo Green | Undecided |
|---|---|---|---|---|---|---|---|
| Public Policy Polling (D) | December 15–16, 2023 | 556 (LV) | ± 4.2% | 7% | 5% | 11% | 77% |

=== Results ===
Results by county Green: 40–50%; 50–60%; 60–70%; 70–80%; 80–90%; Eddings: 40–50%; Crumble: 40–50%

Democratic primary results
| Party | Candidate | Votes | % |
|---|---|---|---|
| Democratic | Mo Green | 431,922 | 65.84% |
| Democratic | Katie Eddings | 163,234 | 24.88% |
| Democratic | Kenon Crumble | 60,844 | 9.27% |
| Total votes | | 656,000 | 100.0% |

== Campaign ==
The race gained attention due to Morrow's history of controversial statements, such as calling for the execution of Presidents Barack Obama and Joe Biden. She had also referred to public schools as "indoctrination centers" and attended protests outside of the United States Capitol on January 6, 2021. President Obama made comments about the race during a rally for Kamala Harris in Charlotte, saying he was "self-interested" because Morrow "thinks I should face a firing squad." Obama endorsed Green, whom he said has "actually run one of the largest school systems in the state and will make sure your kids get the education they deserve."

=== Polling ===
| Poll source | Date(s) administered | Sample size | Margin of error | Michele Morrow (R) | Mo Green (D) | Undecided |
|---|---|---|---|---|---|---|
| SurveyUSA (Note: Poll conducted in partnership with WRAL-TV) | October 23–26, 2024 | 853 (LV) | ± 4.1% | 42% | 41% | 17% |
| ActiVote | October 8–26, 2024 | 400 (LV) | ± 4.9% | 49% | 51% | – |
| Cygnal (R) (Note: Poll sponsored by the Carolina Journal) | October 12–14, 2024 | 600 (LV) | ± 3.99% | 43% | 46% | 11% |
| ActiVote | August 20 – September 22, 2024 | 400 (LV) | ± 4.9% | 49% | 51% | – |
| Cygnal (R) | September 15–16, 2024 | 600 (LV) | ± 4.0% | 39% | 43% | 18% |
| SurveyUSA | September 4–7, 2024 | 676 (LV) | ± 4.9% | 38% | 40% | 22% |
| YouGov (D) (Note: Poll sponsored by Carolina Forward) | August 5–9, 2024 | 802 (RV) | ± 3.9% | 39% | 42% | 19% |
| Cygnal (R) | August 4–5, 2024 | 600 (LV) | ± 4.0% | 42% | 37% | 21% |
| Change Research (D) | May 13–18, 2024 | 835 (LV) | ± 3.8% | 40% | 41% | 19% |
| SurveyUSA | March 6–9, 2024 | 736 (RV) | ± 4.9% | 41% | 40% | 19% |
| Cygnal (R) (Note: Poll sponsored by the John Locke Foundation) | March 6–7, 2024 | 600 (LV) | ± 4.0% | 41% | 39% | 20% |

== Results ==
2024 North Carolina Superintendent of Public Instruction election
| Party | Candidate | Votes | % | ±% |
|---|---|---|---|---|
| Democratic | Mo Green | 2,837,606 | 51.18% | +2.56% |
| Republican | Michele Morrow | 2,706,953 | 48.82% | –2.56% |
| Total votes | | 5,544,559 | 100.0% | |
| Democratic gain from Republican | | | | |

Counties that flipped from Democratic to Republican

- Pasquotank (largest city: Elizabeth City)
- Scotland (largest city: Laurinburg)

Counties that flipped from Republican to Democratic

- Alamance (largest city: Burlington)
- Lenoir (largest city: Kinston)
- Martin (largest city: Williamston)
- New Hanover (largest municipality: Wilmington)

== See also ==
- 2024 North Carolina elections
