= 2008 North Carolina Superintendent of Public Instruction election =

- November 4, 2008
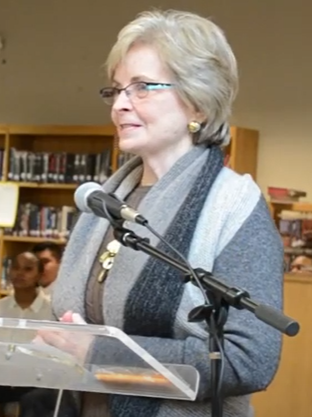

Candidate	June Atkinson	Richard Morgan
Party	Democratic	Republican
Popular vote	2,177,934	1,881,075
Percentage	53.66%	46.34%
- County results Atkinson: 50–60% 60–70% 70–80% Morgan: 50–60% 60–70%
Superintendent of Public Instruction before election
June Atkinson
Democratic
Elected Superintendent of Public Instruction
June Atkinson
Democratic

The 2008 North Carolina Superintendent of Public Instruction election was held on November 4, 2008, to elect the North Carolina Superintendent of Public Instruction, concurrently with the 2008 presidential election, as well as elections to the United States Senate, U.S. House of Representatives, governor, the Council of State, and other state, local, and judicial elections. Primary elections were held on May 6, 2008.

Incumbent Democratic state superintendent June Atkinson defeated former Republican state legislator Richard Morgan in the general election.

== Democratic primary ==
=== Candidates ===
==== Nominee ====
- June Atkinson, incumbent state superintendent (2004–present)

==== Eliminated in primary ====
- Eddie Davis, educator from Weldon and former president of the North Carolina Association of Educators

=== Polling ===
Poll source	Date(s) administered	Sample size (Note: Key: A – all adults RV – registered voters LV – likely voters V – unclear)	Margin of error	June Atkinson	Eddie Davis	Undecided
Public Policy Polling	April 26–27, 2008	1,121 (LV)	± 2.9%	35%	17%	48%
Public Policy Polling	April 19–20, 2008	962 (LV)	± 3.2%	34%	14%	52%
Public Policy Polling	April 19–20, 2008	962 (LV)	± 3.2%	34%	14%	52%
Public Policy Polling	March 3, 2008	508 (LV)	± 4.3%	37%	14%	49%
Public Policy Polling	December 3, 2007	676 (LV)	± 3.7%	38%	13%	48%
Public Policy Polling	October 3, 2007	621 (LV)	± 3.9%	32%	15%	54%

=== Results ===
Primary results by county Atkinson: 50–60%; 60–70%; Davis: 50–60%; 60–70%; 70–80%

Democratic primary results
Party	Candidate	Votes	%
Democratic	June Atkinson (incumbent)	660,556	52.86%
Democratic	Eddie Davis	589,126	47.14%
Total votes		1,249,682	100.00%

== Republican primary ==
=== Candidates ===
==== Nominee ====
- Richard Morgan, speaker pro tempore of the North Carolina House of Representatives (2005–2007) and former state representative from the 31st district (1991–2003) and 52nd district (2003–2007)

==== Eliminated in primary ====
- Joe Johnson, former director of public affairs for the Henderson County Sheriff's Office
- Eric Smith

=== Polling ===
Poll source	Date(s) administered	Sample size	Margin of error	Richard Morgan	Eric Smith	Joe Johnson	Undecided
Public Policy Polling	May 3–4, 2008	662 (LV)	± 3.8%	19%	13%	12%	56%
Public Policy Polling	April 26–27, 2008	622 (LV)	± 3.9%	16%	10%	9%	65%
Public Policy Polling	April 19–20, 2008	602 (LV)	± 3.9%	13%	11%	7%	69%
Public Policy Polling	March 29–30, 2008	744 (LV)	± 3.6%	17%	11%	10%	62%
Public Policy Polling	March 3, 2008	778 (LV)	± 3.5%	16%	8%	12%	64%

=== Results ===
Primary results by county Morgan: 40–50%; 50–60%; 60–70%; Smith: 40–50%; Johnson: 30–40%; 40–50%

Republican primary results
Party	Candidate	Votes	%
Republican	Richard Morgan	203,090	51.34%
Republican	Eric Smith	97,098	24.55%
Republican	Joe Johnson	95,382	24.11%
Total votes		395,570	100.00%

== General election ==
=== Polling ===
Poll source	Date(s) administered	Sample size	Margin of error	June Atkinson (D)	Richard Morgan (R)	Undecided
Public Policy Polling	October 18–19, 2008	1,200 (LV)	± 2.8%	50%	38%	12%
Public Policy Polling	September 28–29, 2008	1,041 (LV)	± 3.0%	45%	38%	18%
Public Policy Polling	August 20–23, 2008	904 (LV)	± 3.3%	39%	34%	27%
Public Policy Polling	June 26–29, 2008	1,048 (LV)	± 3.0%	39%	35%	26%
Public Policy Polling	July 23–27, 2008	823 (LV)	± 3.4%	44%	37%	20%
Public Policy Polling	May 8–9, 2008	616 (LV)	± 4.0%	42%	36%	22%

=== Results ===
2008 North Carolina Superintendent of Public Instruction election
Party	Candidate	Votes	%
Democratic	June Atkinson (incumbent)	2,177,934	53.66%
Republican	Richard Morgan	1,881,075	46.34%
Total votes		4,059,009	100.00%
Democratic hold			
