= Alfred W. Gwinn =

American United Methodist bishop

The Reverend Bishop Alfred Wesley Gwinn Jr.
- North Carolina Annual Conference
- Diocese: North Carolina Annual Conference
- See: Southeastern Jurisdiction
- Installed: 2004
- Term ended: 2012
- Successor: Hope Morgan Ward

Personal details
- Born: Alfred Wesley Gwinn, Jr.
- Denomination: United Methodist
- Spouse: Joyce Hannah Gwinn
- Children: Debbie Mann, Christy Morgan
- Education: University of Kentucky

Styles of Alfred Wesley Gwinn II
- Reference style: The Reverend Bishop
- Religious style: Bishop
- Posthumous style: not applicable

Alfred Wesley Gwinn Jr. is an American Methodist prelate. He is the former residing bishop of the North Carolina Annual Conference of the United Methodist Church. He held the office of Bishop of North Carolina from 2004 to 2012. His offices were located in Raleigh, North Carolina.

== Biography ==
Gwinn's last appointment before being appointed bishop was as the senior pastor of First United Methodist Church in Lexington, Kentucky.

During his ten-year tenure at Lexington Centenary, he led the congregation through relocation and the building of an $11 million facility. Worship attendance doubled and became the largest in the conference. In addition, the church parented a new multicultural congregation, developed an ongoing ministry partnership with a congregation in Londrina, Brazil, and brought an African-American pastor on staff, the first in the conference to serve a predominantly-white congregation.

In 2012, Gwinn retired from the bishopric and was succeeded by Bishop Hope Morgan Ward.

=== Personal life ===
Gwinn is married to Joyce Hannah Gwinn, a retired coronary care nurse. They have two adult daughters: Debbie Mann and Christy Morgan. They have four grandchildren, Wesley, Luke, Tyler, and Ally.

== Degrees ==
- Bachelor's degree from University of Kentucky
- Master of Divinity from Asbury Theological Seminary
- Honorary Doctor of Divinity from Union College, Kentucky Wesleyan College, and Asbury Theological Seminary

== Pastoral appointments ==
- 1967 Red House
- 1969 Mount Zion
- 1974 Associate Director, Conference Council on Ministries
- 1976 Covington First United Methodist
- 1980 Corbin First United Methodist
- 1982 Winchester First United Methodist
- 1987 Lexington Centenary
- 1997 Lexington District Superintendent
- 2000 Lexington First United Methodist
- 2004 Bishop, North Carolina Conference
- 2008 Bishop, North Carolina Conference
