= Hope Morgan Ward =

American United Methodist bishop

The Reverend Bishop Hope Morgan Ward
- North Carolina Annual Conference
- Diocese: North Carolina Annual Conference
- See: Southeastern Jurisdiction
- Installed: 2012
- Predecessor: Alfred W. Gwinn
- Successor: Connie Shelton
- Other post: Bishop of Mississippi (2004-2012)

Orders
- Consecration: 07/04/2004

Personal details
- Born: Hope Morgan; September 18, 1951 (age 75)
- Denomination: United Methodist
- Residence: Raleigh, North Carolina
- Spouse: Michael E. Ward
- Children: Jason, Brooke
- Education: Duke University

Styles of Hope Morgan Ward
- Reference style: The Reverend Bishop
- Religious style: Bishop
- Posthumous style: not applicable

Hope Morgan Ward (born September 18, 1951) is an American Methodist prelate who serves as a bishop in the United Methodist Church, elected and consecrated to the episcopacy in 2004.

== Biography ==
Hope Morgan Ward was raised on the Morgan family farm in Corapeake, North Carolina. She graduated from Duke University in 1973 with an A.B. degree in English and Religion. She entered seminary at Duke Divinity School and completed the M.Div. degree in 1978.

Bishop Ward married career educator Michael E. Ward in 1977. Mike served as the North Carolina Superintendent of Public Instruction from 1997 - 2004. The Wards have two children, Jason and Brooke.

== Ordained ministry ==
- Director of Christian Education and Mission, Fairmont UMC, 1973-1978
- Teaching parent, chaplain, Methodist Home for Children, 1977-1979
- Minister of Education, White Plains UMC, 1979-1983
- Pastor, Broadway UMC, 1983-1986
- Pastor, Soapstone UMC, 1986-1997
- Director of Connectional Ministries, 1997-2002
- Raleigh District Superintendent, 2002-2004
- Bishop of Mississippi Conference 2004-2012
- Bishop of North Carolina Conference 2012–2021

== See also ==
- List of bishops of the United Methodist Church
