= Charles H. Mebane =

American politician (1862–1926)

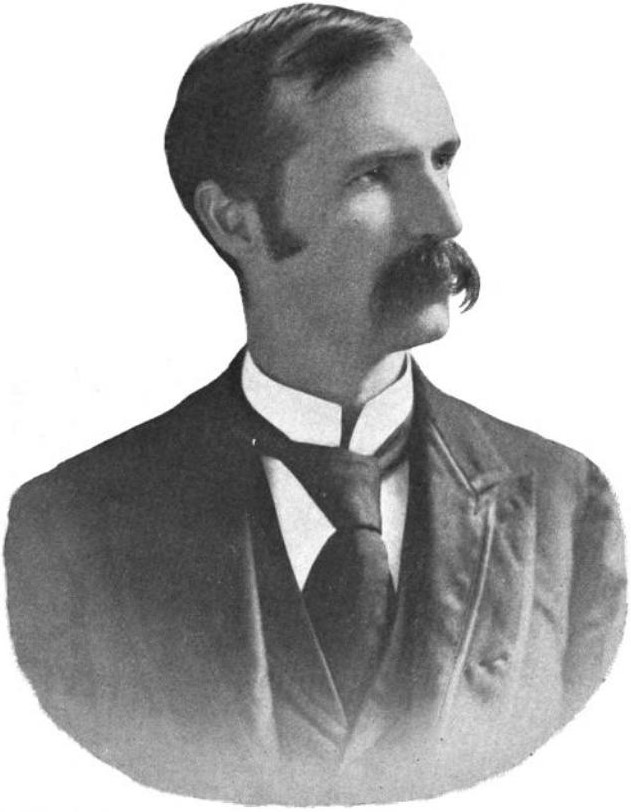
- Mebane c. 1900

8th North Carolina Superintendent of Public Instruction
- In office 1897–1901
- Governor: Daniel L. Russell
- Preceded by: John C. Scarborough
- Succeeded by: Thomas F. Toon

Personal details
- Born: October 27, 1862 Guilford County, North Carolina, U.S.
- Died: December 16, 1926 (aged 64)
- Party: Republican
- Spouse: Minnie Cochrane (m. 1894)
- Children: 6
- Education: Catawba College

Charles Harden Mebane (October 27, 1862 – December 16, 1926) was a North Carolina Republican politician and educator who served as North Carolina Superintendent of Public Instruction, as president of Catawba College, and as superintendent of the Catawba County Schools.

== Personal life ==
In 1894, Mebane married his wife, Minnie Cochrane. They had six children.

Party political offices
Preceded by Edward C. Perisho	Republican nominee for North Carolina Superintendent of Public Instruction; 1896	Succeeded by Nereus C. English
First	Populist nominee for North Carolina Superintendent of Public Instruction; 1896	Succeeded by Nereus C. English
