= Buncombe Democratic Party =

Buncombe County Democratic Party
- Chairperson: Kristen Robinson
- Founded: Before 1920
- Headquarters: 951 Old Fairview Rd. Asheville 28803
- Ideology: Centrism; Modern liberalism Progressivism
- Political position: Center to center-left
- National affiliation: Democratic Party; State: North Carolina Democratic Party
- Colors: Blue

Website
- www.buncombedems.org

The Buncombe County Democratic Party (BCDP) is the Buncombe County affiliate of the NC Democratic Party in the United States. It is headquartered in Asheville.

== History ==
In 1920, the BCDP elected Lillian Exum Clement, the first woman to serve in any state legislature in the Southern United States.

== Elected officials ==
=== Council of State ===
- Governor Josh Stein
- Lt. Governor Rachel Hunt
- Attorney General Jeff Jackson
- Secretary of State Elaine Marshall
- Superintendent of Public Instruction Mo Green

=== NC General Assembly ===
- Lindsey Prather
- Brian Turner
- Eric Ager
- Julie Mayfield

=== Asheville City Council ===
- Esther Manheimer
- S. Antanette Mosley
- Bo Hess
- Sheneika Smith
- Sage Turner
- Maggie Ullman

== Related Links ==
- Buncombe Young Democrats Website

== See also ==
- North Carolina Democratic Party
- Buncombe County, North Carolina
