= Samuel S. Ashley =

American Christian minister and educator

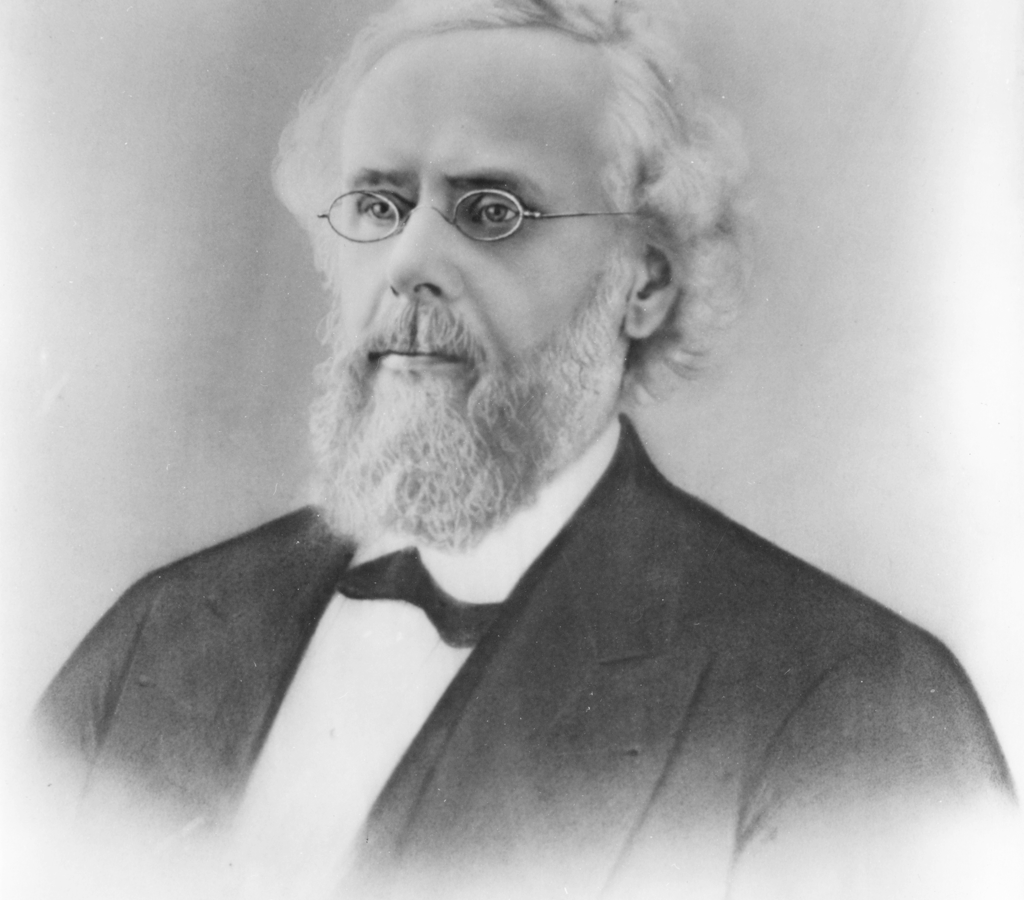

North Carolina Superintendent of Public Instruction
- In office 1868 – October 1, 1871
- Governor: William Woods Holden; Tod Robinson Caldwell
- Preceded by: Calvin H. Wiley
- Succeeded by: Alexander McIver

Personal details
- Born: May 12, 1819 Cumberland, Rhode Island, U.S.
- Died: October 5, 1887 (aged 68)
- Party: Republican
- Spouse: Mary E. Eells

Samuel Stanford Ashley (May 12, 1819 – October 5, 1887) was an American Christian minister and educator who served as the North Carolina Superintendent of Public Instruction from 1868 to 1871.

== Early life ==
Ashley was born on May 12, 1819, in Cumberland, Rhode Island, to attorney Samuel Ashley and Lydia Franklin Olney Ashley and was one of 11 children. He grew up in Ashford and Providence, attending schools in Providence and enrolling in Oberlin College in 1837. He left the college in 1840 due to poor health, thereafter organizing temperance societies and editing a newspaper, the Samaritan. He married Mary E. Eells in 1842 and had two children with her. He served as president of the Meeting Street School from 1843 to 1846. In June 1846 he re-enrolled at Oberlin College to study theology and graduated in 1849.

== Career ==
=== Early ministry ===
Ashley was ordained as a Congregational minister in August 1849. He served as an acting pastor of a church in Fall River, Massachusetts, from then until June 1852, when he became pastor of a church in Northborough. Ashley was an avid supporter of the anti-slavery American Missionary Association (AMA), and in 1860 sent money to the association to aid in its attempts to free a minister in North Carolina who had been jailed for promoting slavery's abolition. After the start of the American Civil War, he informed the AMA of his desire to be sent to the Southern United States to serve as a missionary.

In September 1864, Ashley was removed from his ministry in Northborough and sent to work with the United States Christian Commission in Virginia. Over the course of the war he grew concerned about the status of black freedmen and felt compelled to aid them. In April 1865, the AMA sent him to Wilmington, North Carolina to coordinate the creation of schools for freedmen. By May he had overseen the creation of eight schools, and was enlisted to help establish like institutions elsewhere in the state. At his urging, the AMA also funded the opening of the Brewer Orphan Asylum near Wilmington in May 1866.

=== Political involvement ===
Page of the 1868 Constitution of North Carolina showing Ashley's addition on education as a right

Ashley's interest in political affairs grew due to his involvement in freedmen education. A supporter of Congressional Reconstruction, he pushed for the political equality of whites and blacks, joined the Republican Association in Wilmington, and aided in the creation of The Wilmington Post. While widely perceived as white, the Wilmington Weekly Journal argued that he was really black; Ashley ignored the accusation. In 1868, he was elected as a delegate of New Hanover County to participate in North Carolina's constitutional convention. He served as chairman of the convention's education committee and, while he spoke little, helped draft provisions which guaranteed public schools for blacks. He helped quash the efforts of Conservatives to constitutionally require racial segregation in public schools, though such institutions would eventually be established as segregated institutions. At Ashley's motion, the convention added the sentence, "The people have a right to the privilege of education and it is the duty of the State to guard and maintain that right," to the constitution's declaration of rights. This made North Carolina the first state in the country to constitutionally ensure the right to pursue an education. Later that year Ashley was elected North Carolina Superintendent of Public Instruction.

Ashley sought to establish a progressive statewide educational system as envisioned by the constitution but quickly encountered difficulties. In his 1868 message to the North Carolina General Assembly, he bemoaned the low income the Department of Public Instruction had garnered from its investments—largely due to holdings in defaulted bonds—and warned, "A state can afford to be poor, but cannot afford to be ignorant." With the support of Governor William Woods Holden, Ashley lobbied the passage of "An Act to Provide for a System of Public Instruction" to fruition on April 12, 1869. The law provided for townships to maintain public schools with local financial support open at minimum four months a year and appropriated a $100,000 state subsidy to assist. The appropriation proved meaningless due to the lack of actual funds available in the state treasury and local governments proved unwilling to collect the taxes, frustrating Ashley's efforts. To rectify the situation, in March 1870 the General Assembly levied a state property tax for the purpose of supporting schools.

In 1869 Ashely urged the AMA to cede its schools to state control. He also authorized a disbursement from the public school fund to enable the University of North Carolina at Chapel Hill—then lacking sufficient state appropriations—to operate throughout the 1869/1870 academic year. He resigned effective October 1, 1871.

=== Later ministry ===
Following his resignation, Ashley was hired as a professor at Straight University at the behest of the AMA. Shortly thereafter he was made acting president of the school. He concurrently pastored at Morris Brown Congregational Church in New Orleans and led the AMA's activities in southern Louisiana. After successively contracting dengue and yellow fever in 1873, he returned to Northborough to convalesce. In 1874 he was given charge of the AMA's ministry in Atlanta.

== Later life ==
Ashley retired from his Atlanta post in 1878 and moved back to Northborough, Massachusetts. He chaired the local school board and served as the town's postmaster from 1883 to 1885. He died on October 5, 1887, of heart disease and was buried in Providence.

== Works cited ==
- Batchelor, John E. (2015). Race and Education in North Carolina: From Segregation to Desegregation. Baton Rouge: Louisiana University Press. ISBN 9780807161371.
- Evans, William McKee (2004). Ballots and Fence Rails: Reconstruction on the Lower Cape Fear (reprint ed.). University of Georgia Press. ISBN 9780820323848.
- North Carolina Manual (PDF). Raleigh: North Carolina Department of the Secretary of State. 2011. OCLC 2623953. Archived from the original (PDF) on 2023-08-02.
- Raper, Horace W. (1985). William W. Holden: North Carolina's Political Enigma. Chapel Hill: University of North Carolina Press. ISBN 0807850608.
- Richardson, Joe M. (2009). Christian Reconstruction: The American Missionary Association and Southern Blacks, 1861–1890 (reprint ed.). University of Alabama Press. ISBN 9780817355388.

Party political offices
First	Republican nominee for North Carolina Superintendent of Public Instruction; 1868	Succeeded by James C. Reid
