= Bob Etheridge =

American politician (born 1941)

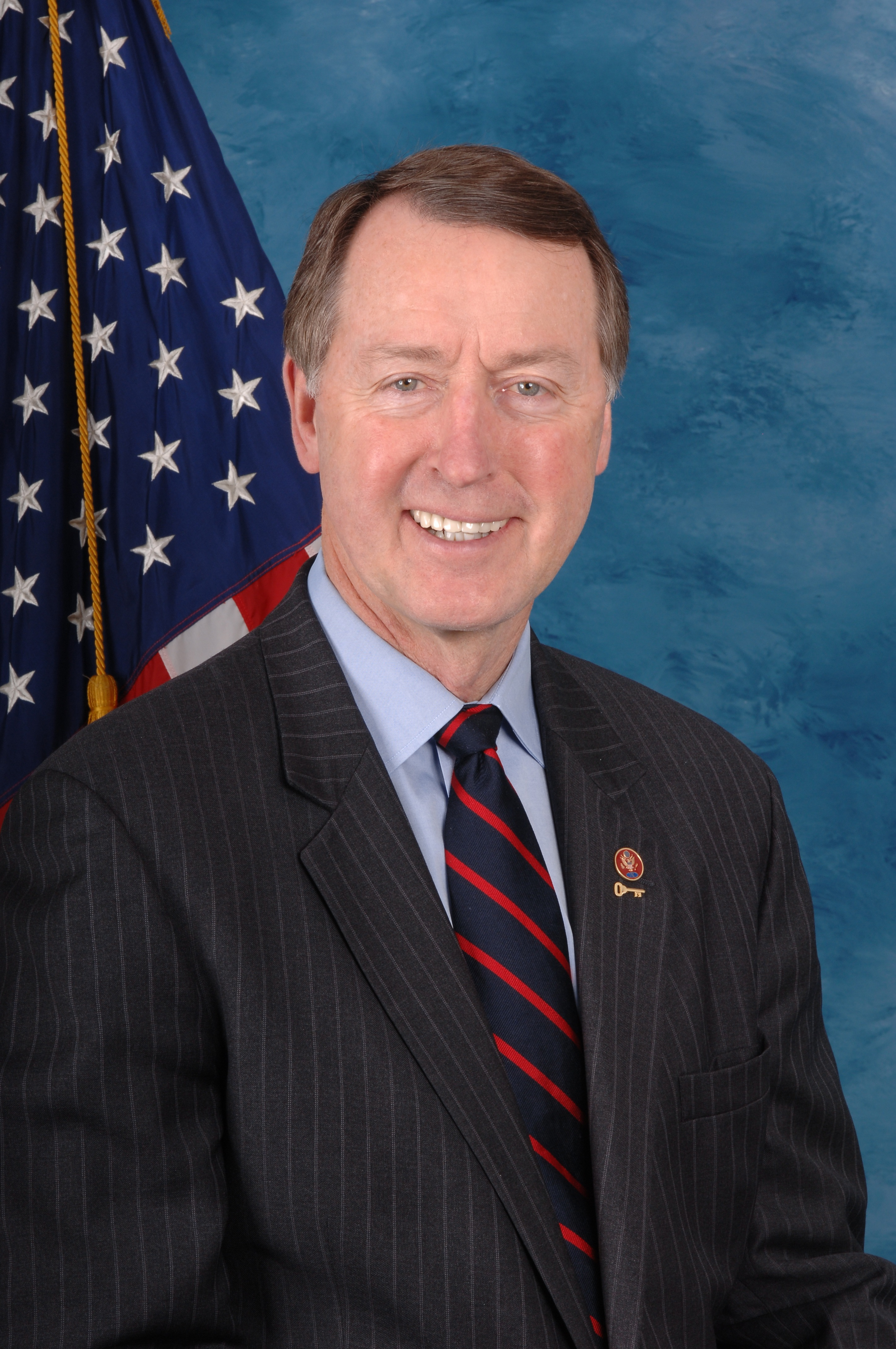

Member of the U.S. House of Representatives from North Carolina's 2nd district
- In office January 3, 1997 – January 3, 2011
- Preceded by: David Funderburk
- Succeeded by: Renee Ellmers

North Carolina Superintendent of Public Instruction
- In office January 1, 1989 – January 1, 1997
- Governor: Jim Martin; Jim Hunt
- Preceded by: Craig Phillips
- Succeeded by: Michael Ward

Member of the North Carolina House of Representatives
- In office January 1, 1979 – January 1, 1989
- Preceded by: Carson Gregory
- Succeeded by: Clarence Poe Stewart
- Constituency: 18th district (1979–1983); 19th district (1983–1989)

Personal details
- Born: Bobby Ray Etheridge; August 7, 1941 (age 85) Sampson County, North Carolina, U.S.
- Party: Democratic
- Spouse: Faye Etheridge
- Children: 3
- Education: Campbell University (BS)
- Website: House website

Military service
- Allegiance: United States
- Branch/service: United States Army
- Years of service: 1965–1967
- Battles/wars: Vietnam War

Bobby Ray "Bob" Etheridge (born August 7, 1941) is an American politician who was the U.S. representative for North Carolina's 2nd congressional district from 1997 to 2011.

He previously served as a county commissioner, state representative and state superintendent of public instruction. He is a member of the Democratic Party and was an unsuccessful candidate for the Democratic nomination for Governor of North Carolina in 2012.

== Early life, education, and early career ==
Bob Etheridge was born on August 7, 1941, in Sampson County, North Carolina, United States to John P. Etheridge and Beatrice Coats Etheridge. He attended the Cleveland School from 1947 to 1959 and was a high school basketball standout. He attended Campbell University on an athletic scholarship and became the first member of his family to earn a diploma when he received a business degree in 1965. He then served in the United States Army from 1965 to 1967. He has also completed graduate work in the field of economics. Etheridge is also a part-time tobacco farmer and hardware store owner.

== Early political career ==
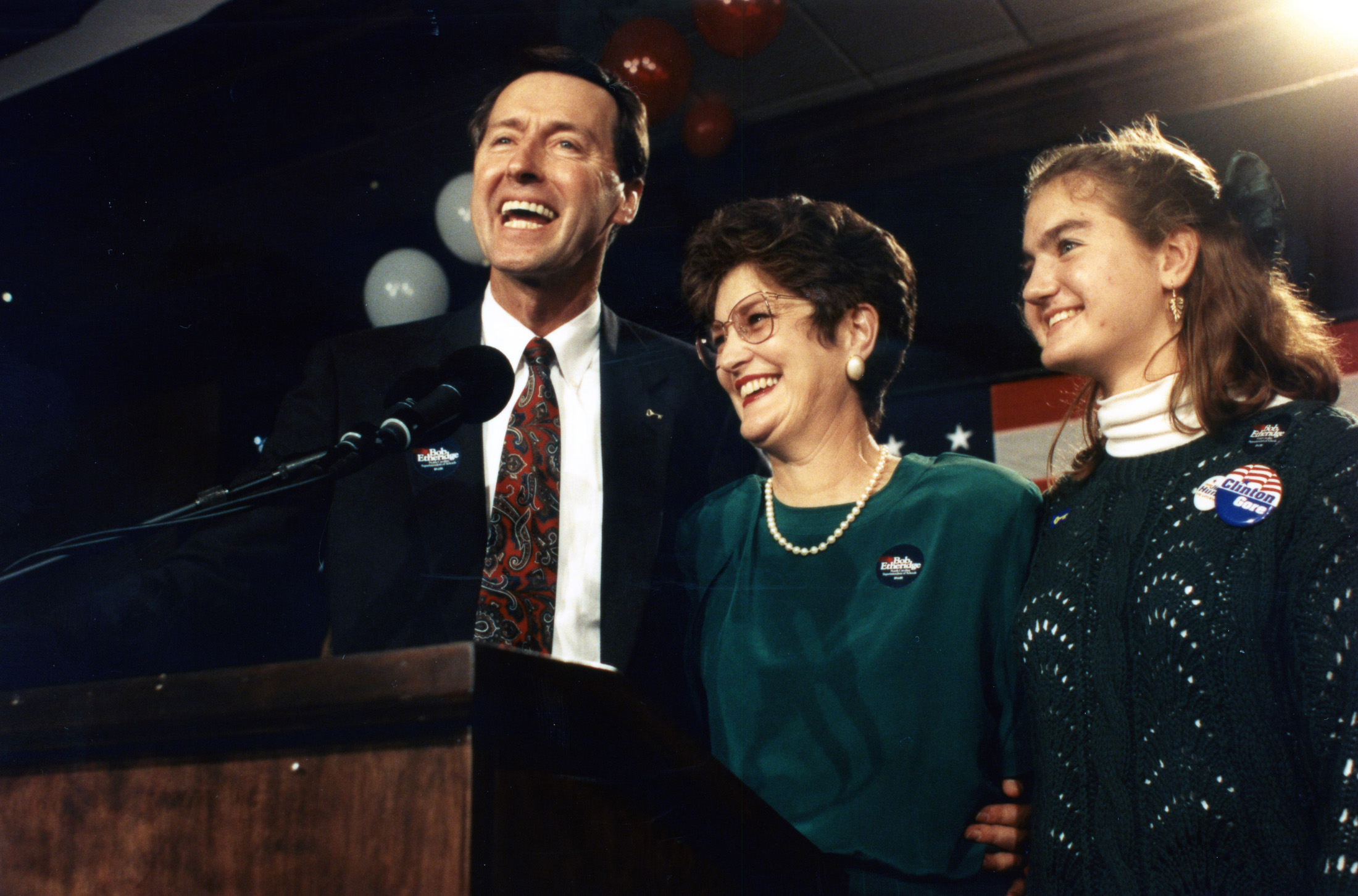
Superintendent Bob Etheridge celebrates victory with his family on election night in 1992

Etheridge served as a Harnett County commissioner from 1973 through 1976, chairing the body from 1974 to 1976. He was then elected in 1978 to the North Carolina House of Representatives, and served five terms (1979–1988) and rose to chair the House Appropriations Committee. Having gained a reputation for his strong stances on educational issues, he was elected in 1988 and served two terms (1989–1996) as North Carolina Superintendent of Public Instruction.

== U.S. House of Representatives ==
=== Elections ===
1996

Ethridge ran for North Carolina's 2nd congressional district and defeated incumbent Republican U.S. Congressman David Funderburk 53%–46%.

1998

He won re-election to a second term with 57% of the vote.

2000

He won re-election to a third term with 58% of the vote.

2002–2008

During this time period, he never won re-election with less than 65% of the vote.

2010

Etheridge was challenged by Republican nominee Renee Ellmers and Libertarian nominee Tom Rose. Ellmers defeated Etheridge 49.5%–48.7%. Etheridge contested the result and requested a recount of the vote. On November 19, 2010, the State Board of Elections director Gary Bartlett confirmed Ellmers won by about 1,483 votes (0.8% margin). Later that day, Etheridge conceded the election.

=== Tenure ===
Etheridge previously served on the Agriculture and Homeland Security committees. He has focused on farm issues, educational matters, and providing a balanced budget.

==== Alternative energy ====
In 2006, Etheridge joined U.S. Congresswoman Stephanie Herseth in proposing increased research and development of biofuels to reduce the United States' dependence on foreign oil.

==== Health care reform ====
Etheridge voted to pass the Affordable Health Care for America Act in November 2009 and the Patient Protection and Affordable Care Act.

==== "Who are you?" incident ====
In June 2010, Etheridge was approached by two young men on a Washington, D.C., sidewalk. The pair, who identified themselves as students working on a project, asked Etheridge if he "fully supported the Obama agenda" while videorecording his response. In the video, Etheridge first says "Who are you?" repeatedly, then is seen grabbing one of the young men by the wrists, neck, and back of the shirt, while repeatedly asking the young men who they were. The young men responded that they were "students working on a project". One of them is heard asking the congressman three times to let go of him while the congressman continued to hold on to him. Etheridge later apologized for the incident in a statement saying "I deeply and profoundly regret my reaction, and I apologize to all involved". Etheridge called a press conference where he stated that there was no excuse for his actions. He refused to speculate on the motivation of those involved and said that it had been a "long day". An article in The New York Times subsequently stated that unnamed "Republican political strategists acknowledge they were behind the episode."

Political analysts commented on the potential effect of this confrontation on Etheridge's chances of re-election against Republican candidate Renee Ellmers. Subsequently, on June 18, a 32-year-old man, Brandon Leslie, said he had been a victim of a similar incident occurring in 1996 in which Etheridge grabbed him when he was a high school student. That report was later disputed by the retired principal who stated that "the student was in the wrong"; however, the principal "did not detail the nature of the exchange between Leslie and Etheridge."

=== Committee assignments ===
==== 111th Congress ====
- Committee on the Budget
- Committee on Ways and Means
  - Subcommittee on Trade
  - Subcommittee on Oversight

=== Caucus memberships ===
- New Democrat Coalition, a moderate, pro-growth organization
- Democratic At-Large Whip (2008–2011)

== Post-congressional career ==
On February 1, 2011, Governor Bev Perdue announced her appointment of Etheridge as head of the North Carolina Office of Economic Recovery and Investment, replacing Dempsey Benton, which oversees funds to the state from the American Recovery and Reinvestment Act of 2009.

In February 2012, Etheridge announced his candidacy for Governor of North Carolina in the 2012 Democratic gubernatorial primary He lost the Democratic primary to Lieutenant Governor Walter Dalton. After Dalton lost to Pat McCrory in the general election, Etheridge came within a few votes of being elected chairman of the North Carolina Democratic Party in 2013, even though he did not publicly campaign for the post. Later in 2013, he was named the executive director of the North Carolina office of the Farm Service Agency. Etheridge left the position when President Donald Trump took office, as is customary for political appointees. The Trump administration appointed Len McBride to succeed Etheridge in the politically appointed position. Upon, Joe Biden taking office, Etheridge was once again appointed to the position.

== Personal life ==
Etheridge and his wife Faye have three children and nine grandchildren. A Presbyterian, he and his wife are active in their church and both teach Sunday School. For his decades-long work for the Boy Scouts of America, Etheridge was awarded the Silver Beaver Award; the highest award a Scout leader can receive. He is a Freemason and has served as Grand Orator.

== See also ==
- North Carolina Democratic Party

== Works cited ==
- Marcus, Lisa A., ed. (1994). North Carolina Manual 1993–1994 (PDF). Raleigh: North Carolina Secretary of State. ISBN 9780810620377. OCLC 244121350.

North Carolina House of Representatives
Preceded by Carson Gregory	Member of the North Carolina House of Representatives from the 18th district 1979–1983; Served alongside: Dela Fletcher Harris III, Dennis Wicker	Succeeded by Rayford Donald Beard; William Edwin Clark; Henry McMillan Tyson
Preceded by Edd Nye; George Ronald Taylor; Ottis Richard Wright Jr.	Member of the North Carolina House of Representatives from the 19th district 1983–1989; Served alongside: Dennis Wicker	Succeeded by Clarence Poe Stewart
Political offices
Preceded by Craig Phillips	North Carolina Superintendent of Public Instruction; 1989–1997	Succeeded by Michael Ward
U.S. House of Representatives
Preceded by David Funderburk	Member of the U.S. House of Representatives from North Carolina's 2nd congressional district 1997–2011	Succeeded by Renee Ellmers
U.S. order of precedence (ceremonial)
Preceded by Charles Bass as Former U.S. Representative	Order of precedence of the United States as Former U.S. Representative	Succeeded by Ron Lewis as Former U.S. Representative
