= Michael E. Ward =

American politician

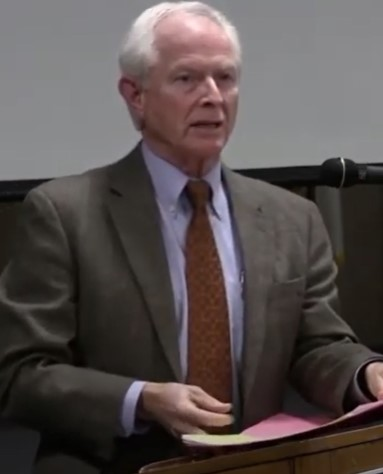
- Ward in 2015

North Carolina Superintendent of Public Instruction
- In office 1996–2004
- Governor: Jim Hunt; Mike Easley
- Preceded by: Bob Etheridge
- Succeeded by: Patricia N. Willoughby

Personal details
- Born: Franklin County, North Carolina, U.S.
- Party: Democratic
- Spouse: Hope Morgan Ward
- Education: North Carolina State University

Michael E. Ward is an American politician who served as North Carolina Superintendent of Public Instruction from 1996 to 2004.

Born in Franklin County, North Carolina, Ward attended North Carolina State University. Upon graduation, he was employed as a public school teacher, and later principal, before serving as superintendent of public schools in Granville County. After being named North Carolina's 'Superintendent of the Year' in 1994, Ward was elected State Superintendent of Public Instruction in 1996. A Democrat, Ward was elected to a second term in 2000. He chose not to stand for reelection in 2004.

In August 2004, Ward stepped down from his position prematurely to join his wife, Hope Morgan Ward, who had accepted a position as a Methodist bishop in Mississippi. Patricia N. Willoughby was appointed to fill the position for the remainder of Ward's term.

== Personal life ==
Ward and his wife have two children, Jason and Brooke.
