= Patricia N. Willoughby =

American educator and former government appointee

North Carolina Superintendent of Public Instruction
- In office September 2004 – August 23, 2005
- Appointed by: Mike Easley
- Preceded by: Michael E. Ward
- Succeeded by: June Atkinson

Personal details
- Education: University of North Carolina at Chapel Hill; Meredith College (M.A.)

Patricia N. Willoughby is an American educator and former government appointee from North Carolina. She was appointed by Governor Mike Easley as the interim North Carolina Superintendent of Public Instruction in September 2004, following the resignation of Mike Ward, and served the remaining months of Ward's term.

A new superintendent was to be chosen in the Council of State elections in November 2004. She was not a candidate in that election. Her term lasted until August 23, 2005, when her successor, Democrat June Atkinson, was sworn in.

Willoughby, a North Carolina native, attended the University of North Carolina at Chapel Hill and worked as a public school teacher. She earned a master's degree in education from Meredith College in 1990, and was appointed to the North Carolina State Board of Education by Governor Mike Easley in July 2001. Willoughby was an instructor in elementary education at Meredith College in Raleigh, North Carolina.

After leaving office, she began serving as the director of the North Carolina Business Committee for Education in the office of the North Carolina governor. She is married to Wake County district attorney, Colon Willoughby, and has two daughters.
