= Sidney M. Finger =

American politician (1837–1896)

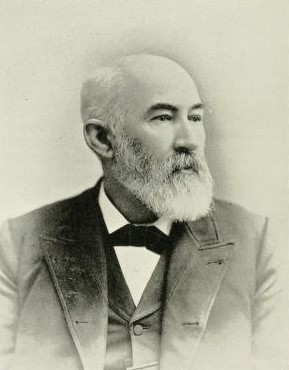
- Finger c. 1892

North Carolina Superintendent of Public Instruction
- In office January 1, 1885 – December 31, 1892
- Preceded by: John C. Scarborough
- Succeeded by: John C. Scarborough

North Carolina House of Representatives
- In office 1874–1875

North Carolina Senate
- In office 1876–1877
- In office 1881–1882

Personal details
- Born: May 24, 1837 Lincoln County, North Carolina
- Died: December 26, 1896 (aged 59) Newton, North Carolina
- Party: Democratic

Sidney Michael Finger (May 24, 1837 – December 26, 1896) was an American businessman, teacher, and politician. He served in the North Carolina House of Representatives, the North Carolina Senate and as North Carolina Superintendent of Public Instruction from 1885 to 1893.

== Early life ==
Sidney Michael Finger was born May 24, 1837, in Lincoln County, North Carolina to Daniel and Sallie Finger. He worked on a farm with his father as a child. Being initially educated at a local school, Finger enrolled at Catawba College in 1855. He studied there for four years, spending his time in between semesters working as a tutor and teacher. In 1859 he entered Bowdoin College in Maine as a junior and graduated in May 1861 with a bachelor's degree.

Finger briefly worked as a schoolteacher in Bishopville, South Carolina, before enlisting in the Confederate States Army in Lincoln County on March 22, 1862, to fight in the American Civil War. He was eventually placed in Company I, Eleventh Regiment, North Carolina Troops. During the war he rose from the rank of first corporal to major. Paroled in Charlotte on May 3, 1865, he moved to Newton to teach at and help lead the Catawba English and Classical High School. On December 22, 1866, Finger married Sarah Hoyle Rhyne, with whom he had no children. In 1871, he earned a master's degree from Bowdoin College. He retired from teaching at the Catawba school in 1874 due to poor health.

== Political career ==
Major Finger was first elected to the North Carolina House of Representatives to serve from 1874 until 1875 when he served on the education committee and was the chairman of the joint committee on enrolled bills. He was then elected to the North Carolina Senate to serve in the 1876-1877 session representing the 37th District and he was the chairman of the committee on education. He was again elected to the Senate in 1881 serving until 1882. During this session he helped re-write the school law to what became the foundation for the current school system.

He authored Civil Government in North Carolina and the United States: A School Manual and History. He supported industrial education.

In 1884, Finger, running as a Democrat was elected North Carolina Superintendent of Public Instruction. He served two terms in the office from January 1, 1885, to December 31, 1892.

== Later life ==
Finger died December 26, 1896, unexpectedly while at home in Newton, North Carolina. He was honored in June 1897 at the commencement of the State Normal and Industrial College, now the University of North Carolina at Greensboro, with speeches from several including ex-Senator W. P. Shaw. Finger had been involved with the college from its inception until his death.
