= North Carolina Democratic Party =

North Carolina affiliate of the Democratic Party

- Chairperson: Anderson Clayton
- Governor: Josh Stein
- Lieutenant Governor: Rachel Hunt
- Senate Leader: Sydney Batch
- House Leader: Robert Reives
- Founded: 1828
- Headquarters: 220 Hillsborough Street, Raleigh, NC 27603
- Membership (2025): ▲2,310,608
- Ideology: Social liberalism Progressivism
- Political position: Center-left
- National affiliation: Democratic Party
- Colors: Blue
- Council of State: 5 / 10
- Seats in the North Carolina Senate: 20 / 50
- Seats in the North Carolina House of Representatives: 47 / 120
- U.S. Senate: 0 / 2
- U.S. House of Representatives: 4 / 14
- State Supreme Court: 2 / 7

Election symbol

Website
- www.ncdp.org

The North Carolina Democratic Party (NCDP) is the North Carolina affiliate of the Democratic Party. It is headquartered in the historic Goodwin House, located in Raleigh.

The party controls the governorship and four other non-judicial statewide elected offices, as well as four of the state's 14 U.S. House seats. Since the 2010 passage of the Affordable Care Act, North Carolina Democrats have advocated for increasing the state's minimum wage.

== History ==
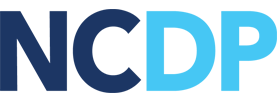
Previous logo of the North Carolina Democratic Party

The Second Party System emerged from a divide in the Democratic-Republican Party in 1828. They split off into two groups, the Democrats, led by Andrew Jackson, and the Whigs. In North Carolina, people from the west and northeast supported the Whigs mainly for their policies on education and internal improvements. Meanwhile, eastern North Carolina was dominated by wealthy planters who tended to oppose activist government. During the Civil War, Whigs and Unionist Democrats formed the Conservative Party and elected Zebulon Vance as governor on a platform of supporting the Confederate war effort while defending states' rights and civil liberties against the Confederate government in Richmond. Postwar, the Conservative Party reorganized to oppose the reconstruction policies enacted by the U.S. Congress following the Civil War. By 1870, the two main parties were the Conservatives (who changed their name to "Democratic-Conservatives" and then to Democrats by 1876) and the Republicans.

Before the 1960s, many NCDP leaders, as was the case with most state parties in the South, supported racial segregation. But beginning with the Republicans' 1964 presidential campaign and Richard Nixon's "Southern strategy" in 1968, white segregationists, including former U.S. Senator Jesse Helms, flocked to the Republican Party. Since then, most minority voters have supported the NCDP. Jimmy Carter carried North Carolina in the 1976 election, but from 1980 to 2004, the Republican presidential nominee won the state.

In spite of the conservative bent of North Carolina politics, a number of Democrats, such as Terry Sanford and John Edwards, have been elected to represent the state at the federal level. Edwards was the Democratic nominee for vice president in 2004. Republican U.S. Senator Elizabeth Dole was defeated for reelection in 2008 by Democrat Kay Hagan, the same year Barack Obama carried the state in his victory over Republican John McCain by a margin of less than one half of a percentage point.

Since the passage of the Affordable Care Act, North Carolina Democrats have prioritized advocating Medicaid expansion in the state, a policy that would provide a federally subsidized healthcare plan to approximately 500,000 North Carolinians. Another priority for North Carolina Democrats in the 2010s and 2020s has been increasing the minimum wage.

== Leadership ==
The state party chair is Anderson Clayton, who was elected in 2023. The chair is elected by and leads the State Executive Committee (the "SEC"), a body of more than 500 Democratic Party leaders and activists from all 100 counties, which governs the party. Jonah Garson is the First Vice-Chair, Kimberly Hardy is the second Vice-Chair, Elijah King is the Third Vice-Chair and Melvin Williams is the Secretary.

Kian Sadjadi was named Executive Director on November 1, 2023.

== County Parties ==
=== Organized ===
- Alamance
- Alexander
- Alleghany
- Anson
- Ashe
- Avery
- Beaufort
- Bertie
- Bladen
- Brunswick
- Buncombe
- Burke
- Cabarrus
- Caldwell
- Carteret
- Caswell
- Catawba
- Chatham
- Cherokee
- Chowan
- Clay
- Cleveland
- Columbus
- Craven
- Cumberland
- Currituck
- Dare
- Davidson
- Davie
- Duplin
- Durham
- Edgecombe
- Forsyth
- Franklin
- Gaston
- Gates
- Granville
- Guilford
- Halifax
- Harnett
- Haywood
- Henderson
- Hoke
- Iredell
- Jackson
- Johnston
- Lee
- Lincoln
- McDowell
- Macon
- Madison
- Martin
- Mecklenburg
- Mitchell
- Montgomery
- Moore
- Nash
- New Hanover
- Northampton
- Onslow
- Orange
- Pamlico
- Pasquotank
- Pender
- Perquimans
- Person
- Pitt
- Polk
- Randolph
- Richmond
- Robeson
- Rockingham
- Rowan
- Rutherford
- Sampson
- Scotland
- Stanly
- Stokes
- Surry
- Swain
- Transylvania
- Union
- Vance
- Wake
- Warren
- Washington
- Watauga
- Wayne
- Wilkes
- Wilson
- Yadkin
- Yancey

=== Unorganized ===
- Camden
- Graham
- Greene
- Hertford
- Hyde
- Jones
- Lenoir
- Tyrrell

== NCDP organizations ==
- North Carolina Democratic Women
- Young Democrats of North Carolina
- College Democrats of North Carolina
- NC Senior Democrats
- NC Teen Democrats
- African American Caucus of the NC
- NCDP Hispanic American Caucus
- LGBT Democrats of North Carolina
- NCDP Disability Issues Caucus

== Recent electoral results ==
=== 2006 ===
North Carolina Democrats scored impressive victories in the 2006 general elections, increasing their majorities in both houses of the North Carolina General Assembly and defeating incumbent Republican U.S. Representative Charles H. Taylor. In addition, most candidates backed by Democrats in the non-partisan races for the North Carolina Supreme Court and the North Carolina Court of Appeals were elected. These victories came despite controversies surrounding Jim Black, a Democrat and former Speaker of the North Carolina House of Representatives.

=== 2008 ===
In 2008, the North Carolina Democratic Party once again earned major victories in state and federal elections. For the first time since 1976, the Democratic nominee carried North Carolina in the presidential election. Meanwhile, Kay Hagan was elected to the U.S. Senate over incumbent Elizabeth Dole, and Beverly Perdue was elected governor to succeed fellow Democrat Mike Easley.

=== 2010 ===
In 2010, Republicans swept North Carolina, taking control of both houses of the General Assembly for the first time since 1896, reelecting Richard Burr to a second term by double digits, and unseating incumbent Democratic U.S. Representative Bob Etheridge.

=== 2012 ===
Bev Perdue retired as governor and the Democratic nominee for governor, Lieutenant Governor of North Carolina Walter Dalton was defeated in the general election by Republican Pat McCrory. Incumbent Democratic U.S. Representative Larry Kissell was unseated, and two open U.S. House seats previously controlled by Democrats were also gained by Republicans.

=== 2014 ===
2014 saw incumbent Senator Kay Hagan defeated for reelection, and the seat of U.S. Representative Mike McIntyre who had retired was taken by a Republican. Democrats in the North Carolina House of Representatives flipped four seats from Republican held districts in Wake and Buncombe counties. The state party also saw success in the non-partisan races for North Carolina Supreme Court and the North Carolina Court of Appeals.

=== 2016 ===
In 2016, Democrats retook the governor's office, electing then-Attorney General Roy Cooper, while also electing a Democrat to succeed him as Attorney General, Josh Stein. Meanwhile, Democrats lost seats in the North Carolina Council of State, picked up one seat in the state House and lost one seat in the state Senate. Democratic nominee Deborah K. Ross lost the U.S. Senate election to incumbent Richard Burr. Democrats retook the majority on the North Carolina Supreme Court for the first time in the 21st century.

=== 2018 ===
In 2018, Democrats added a seat to their judicial majority on the North Carolina Supreme Court when Anita Earls defeated Incumbent Republican Justice Barbara Jackson and lawyer Chris Anglin winning by a plurality vote of 48.79%. Democrats also gained two seats on the North Carolina Court of Appeals and incumbent judge John S. Arrowood ran for his first full term after being appointed by Governor Roy Cooper in 2017. Legislative Democrats were able to break the Republican supermajority's in both the State House and Senate for the first time since losing control of both chambers in 2010.

=== 2020 ===
In 2020, Democratic governor Roy Cooper won reelection.

=== 2022 ===
in 2022, Democrats flipped the redrawn 13th district from Republican control, and won the newly created 14th district, yielding an even 7—7 House delegation.

Republicans won a narrow majority in the NC house by 2 new seats, and a smaller majority in the senate also by 2 new seats. In the state's supreme court Republicans won both seats on the Supreme Court and all four races for the Court of Appeals. As a result of these elections, Republicans holds a 5–2 majority on the North Carolina Supreme Court.

=== Federal ===
==== U.S. Senate ====
Class 2
Year	Candidate	Votes	%	Result
1984	Jim Hunt	1,070,488	47.81%	Lost ✗
1990	Harvey Gantt	981,573	47.39%	Lost ✗
1996	Harvey Gantt	1,173,875	45.92%	Lost ✗
2002	Erskine Bowles	1,047,983	44.96%	Lost ✗
2008	Kay Hagan	2,249,311	52.65%	Won ✓
2014	Kay Hagan	1,377,651	47.26%	Lost ✗
2020	Cal Cunningham	2,569,965	46.94%	Lost ✗
2026	Roy Cooper	2,480,638	58.75%	Won ✓

Class 3
Year	Candidate	Votes	%	Result
1986	Terry Sanford	823,662	51.76%	Lost ✗
1992	Terry Sanford	1,194,015	46.32%	Lost ✗
1998	John Edwards	1,029,237	51.15%	Won ✓
2004	Erskine Bowles	1,632,527	47.02%	Lost ✗
2010	Elaine Marshall	1,145,074	43.05%	Lost ✗
2016	Deborah K. Ross	2,128,165	45.37%	Lost ✗
2022	Cheri Beasley	1,784,049	47.27%	Lost ✗

==== U.S. House ====
Election	Votes	%	Seats (NC)	±	%
2016	2,142,661	46.60	3 / 13	0	2.65
2018	1,771,061	48.35	3 / 13	0	1.75
2020	2,660,535	50.0	5 / 13	▲2	1.61
2022	1,795,170	47.73	7 / 14	▲2	2.23
2024	2,328,248	42.80	4 / 14	▼3	5.65
2026	2,397,783	56.96	11 / 14	▲7	14.68

=== State ===
==== Executive offices ====
Governor
Election	Candidate/ticket	Votes	%	Result
1952	William B. Umstead	796,306	67.50%	Won ✓
1956	Luther H. Hodges	760,480	66.95%	Won ✓
1960	Terry Sanford	735,248	54.45%	Won ✗
1964	Dan K. Moore	790,343	56.59%	Won ✓
1968	Robert W. Scott	821,233	52.70%	Won ✓
1972	Skipper Bowles	729,104	48.45%	Lost ✗
1976	Jim Hunt	1,081,293	64.99%	Won ✓
1980	Jim Hunt	1,143,145	61.88%	Won ✓
1984	Rufus L. Edmisten	1,011,209	45.41%	Lost ✗
1988	Robert B. Jordan	997,408	44.94%	Lost ✗
1992	Jim Hunt	1,368,246	52.72%	Won ✓
1996	Jim Hunt	1,436,638	55.98%	Won ✓
2000	Mike Easley	1,530,324	52.02%	Won ✓
2004	Mike Easley	1,939,154	55.62%	Won ✓
2008	Bev Perdue	2,146,189	50.27%	Won ✓
2012	Walter Dalton	1,931,580	43.23%	Lost ✗
2016	Roy Cooper	2,309,157	49.02%	Won ✓
2020	Roy Cooper	2,834,790	51.52%	Won ✓
2024	Josh Stein	3,069,496	54.90%	Won ✓

== Current elected officials ==
=== Members of Congress ===
==== U.S. Senate ====
U.S. Senator-elect Roy Cooper

Both of North Carolina's U.S. Senate seats have been held by Republicans since 2015. Kay Hagan was the last Democrat to represent North Carolina in the U.S. Senate. First elected in 2008, Hagan lost her bid for a second term in 2014 to Republican challenger Thom Tillis who has held the seat since.

==== U.S. House of Representatives ====
Out of the 14 seats North Carolina is apportioned in the U.S. House of Representatives, 4 are held by Democrats:

District	Member	Photo
1st	Don Davis	
2nd	Deborah K. Ross	
3rd	Raymond Smith Jr. (elect)	
4th	Valerie Foushee	
5th	Chuck Hubbard (elect)	
6th	Cyril Jefferson (elect)	
9th	Richard Ojeda (elect)	
11th	Jamie Ager (elect)	
12th	Alma Adams	
13th	Paul Barringer (elect)	
14th	LaKesha Womack (elect)	

=== Statewide offices ===
Democrats control five of the ten elected statewide offices:

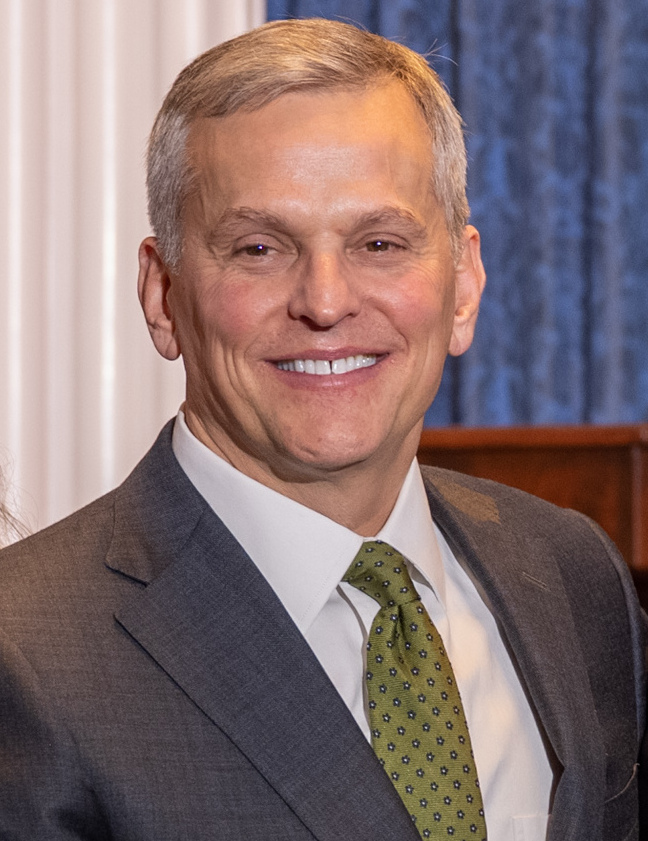
Governor Josh Stein

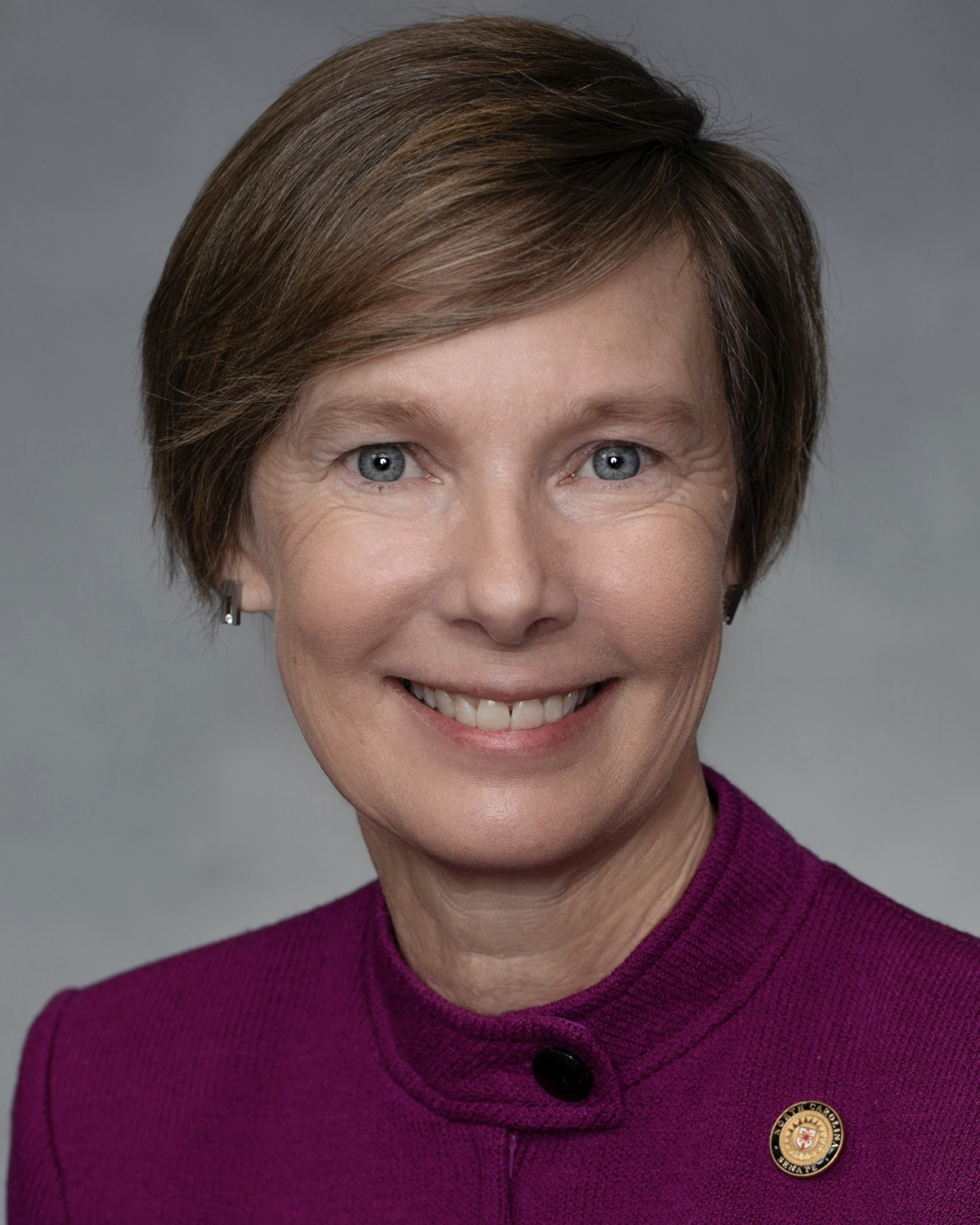
Lieutenant Governor Rachel Hunt

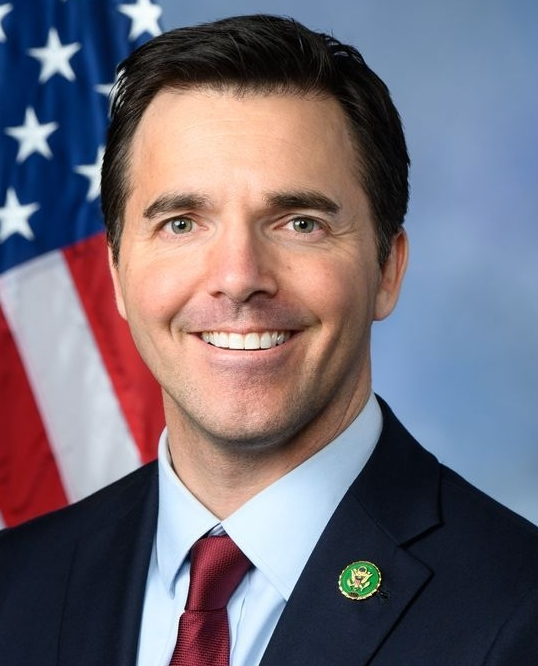
Attorney General Jeff Jackson

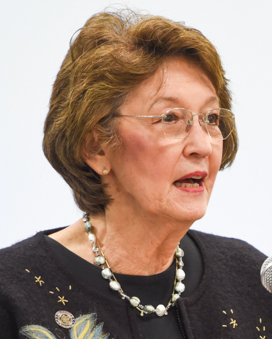
Secretary of State Elaine Marshall

Superintendent of Public Instruction Mo Green

=== State legislative leaders ===
- Senate Minority Leader: Sydney Batch
- Senate Minority Whip: Jay Chaudhuri
- Senate Minority Caucus Secretary: Julie Mayfield
- House Minority Leader: Robert Reives
- House Deputy Minority Leader: Cynthia Ball
- House Minority Whips: Cynthia Ball, Garland Pierce, Deb Butler, Carla Cunningham, and Amos Quick.

==== State House ====
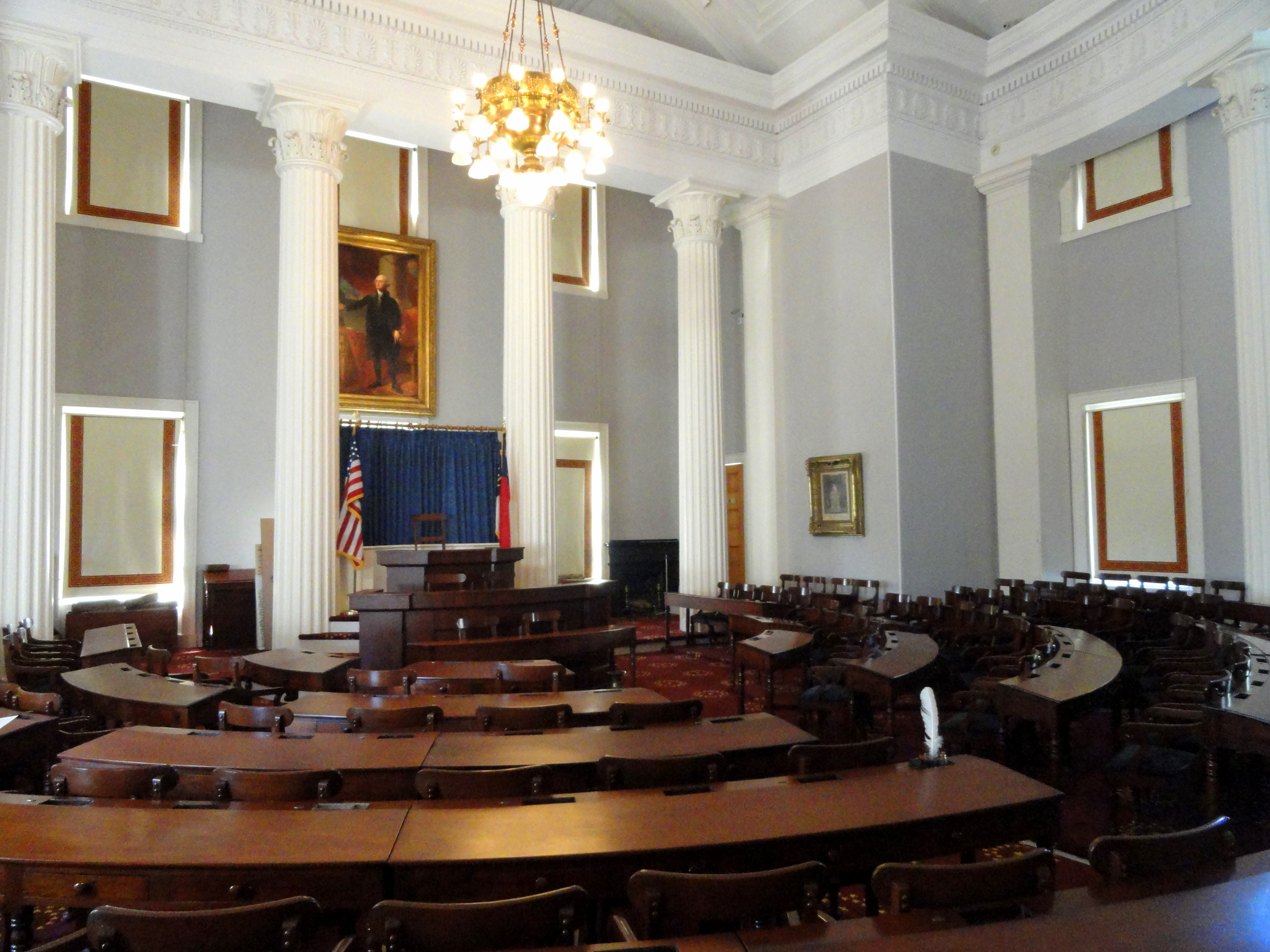
Old House of Representatives Chamber, used until 1963 at the State Capitol

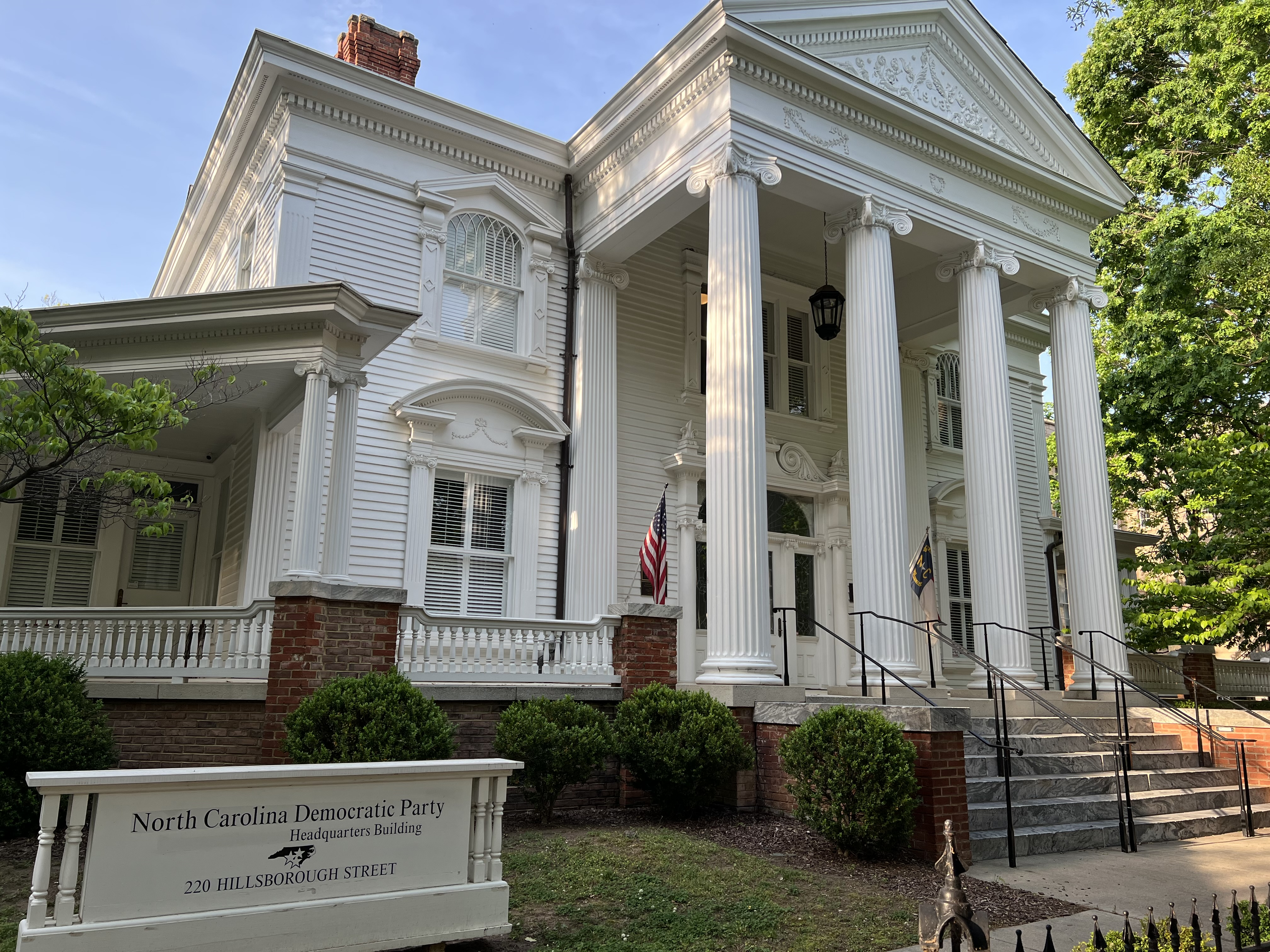
North Carolina Democratic Party building

There are 48 Democratic State House members as of 2024. Current members are listed below:

- District 2: Ray Jeffers
- District 8: Gloristine Brown
- District 11: Allison Dahle
- District 18: Deb Butler
- District 21: Ya Liu
- District 23: Shelly Willingham
- District 27: Michael Wray
- District 29: Vernetta Alston
- District 30: Marcia Morey
- District 31: Zack Forde-Hawkins
- District 33: Rosa Gill
- District 34: Tim Longest
- District 35: Terence Everitt
- District 36: Julie von Haefen
- District 38: Abe Jones
- District 39: James Roberson
- District 40: Joe John
- District 41: Maria Cervania
- District 42: Marvin Lucas
- District 44: Charles Smith
- District 45: Frances Jackson
- District 48: Garland Pierce
- District 49: Cynthia Ball
- District 50: Renee Price
- District 54: Robert Reives
- District 56: Allen Buansi
- District 57: Ashton Clemmons
- District 58: Amos Quick
- District 60: Cecil Brockman
- District 61: Pricey Harrison
- District 66: Sarah Crawford
- District 71: Kanika Brown
- District 72: Amber Baker
- District 73: Diamond Staton-Williams
- District 88: Mary Belk
- District 92: Terry Brown
- District 99: Nasif Majeed
- District 100: John Autry
- District 101: Carolyn Logan
- District 102: Becky Carney
- District 103: Laura Budd
- District 104: Brandon Lofton
- District 105: Wesley Harris
- District 106: Carla Cunningham
- District 107: Bobby Drakeford
- District 114: Eric Ager
- District 115: Lindsey Prather
- District 116: Caleb Rudow

==== State Senate ====
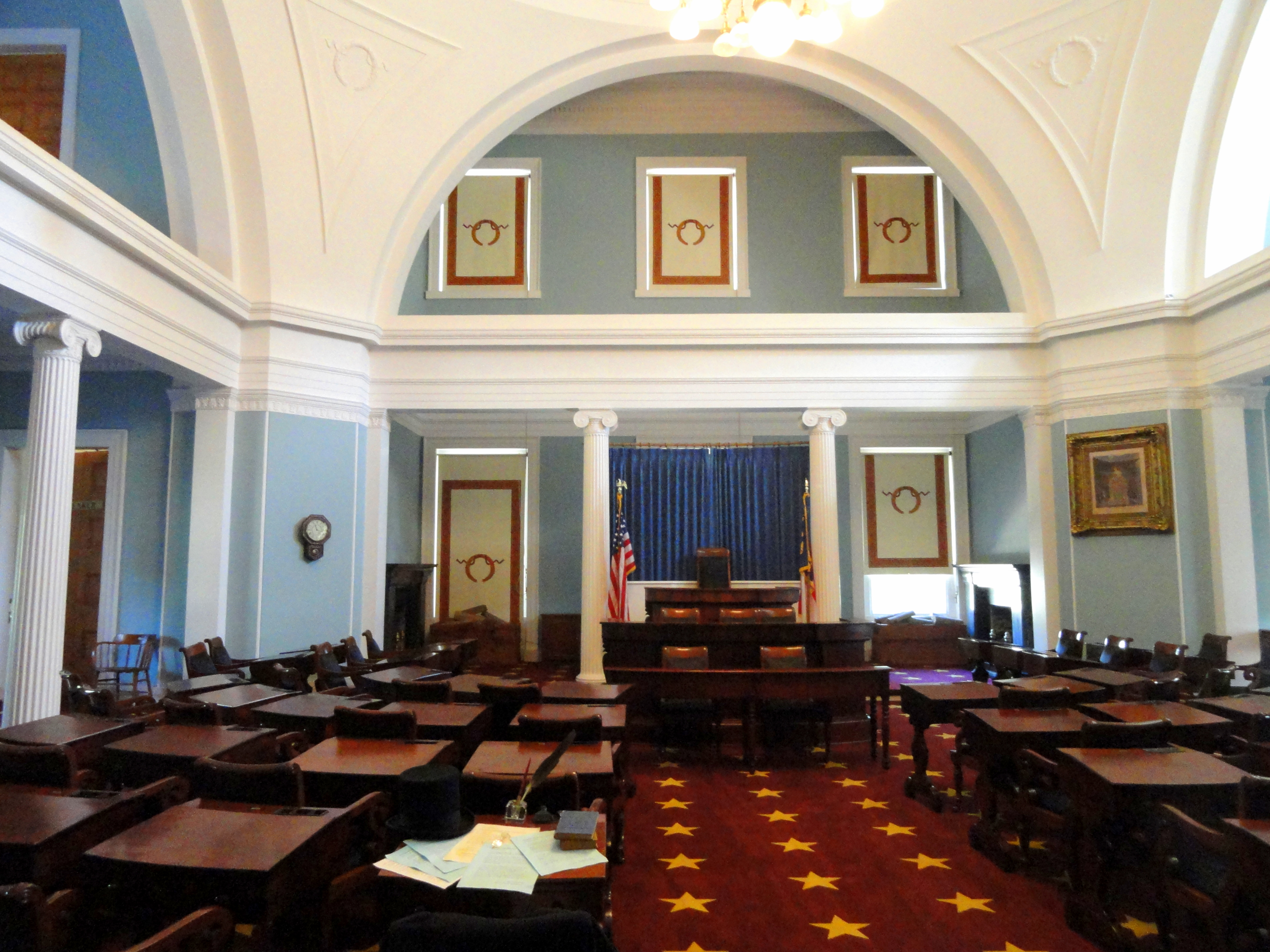
Old Senate Chamber of North Carolina, used until 1963 construction of separate state legislative building

There are 20 Democratic State Senators. Current senators are listed below:

- District 5: Kandie Smith
- District 13: Lisa Grafstein
- District 14: Dan Blue
- District 15: Jay Chaudhuri
- District 16: Gale Adcock
- District 17: Sydney Batch
- District 18: Mary Wills Bode
- District 19: Val Applewhite
- District 20: Natalie Murdock
- District 22: Mike Woodard
- District 23: Graig Meyer
- District 27: Michael Garrett
- District 28: Gladys Robinson
- District 32: Paul Lowe Jr.
- District 38: Mujtaba Mohammed
- District 39: DeAndrea Salvador
- District 40: Joyce Waddell
- District 41: Natasha Marcus
- District 42: Woodson Bradley
- District 49: Julie Mayfield

=== Mayors ===
- Charlotte: Vi Lyles (1)
- Raleigh: Janet Cowell (2)
- Greensboro: Nancy Vaughan (3)
- Durham: Leonardo Williams (4)
- Winston-Salem: Allen Joines (5)
- Fayetteville: Mitch Colvin (6)
- Cary: Harold Weinbrecht (7)
- Wilmington: Bill Saffo (8)
- High Point: Cyril Jefferson (9)
- Asheville: Esther Manheimer (11)
- Apex: Jacques Gilbert (14)
- Huntersville: Christy Underwood Clark (16)
- Chapel Hill: Jessica Anderson (17)

== See also ==
- Buncombe Democratic Party
- North Carolina Republican Party
- Elections in North Carolina
  - Electoral reform in North Carolina
  - North Carolina State Board of Elections
- Politics of North Carolina
  - Political party strength in North Carolina
- Wilmington massacre
