= Thomas F. Toon =

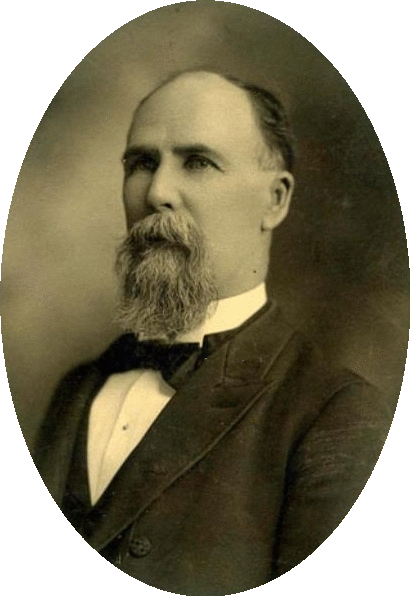
- Born: June 10, 1840; Columbus County, North Carolina
- Died: February 19, 1902 (aged 61); Raleigh, North Carolina
- Burial place: Historic Oakwood Cemetery, Raleigh
- Military career
- Allegiance: United States; Confederate States of America
- Branch: Confederate States Army
- Service years: 1861 – 1865 (CSA)
- Rank: Brigadier General
- Conflicts: American Civil War
- Other work: Educator

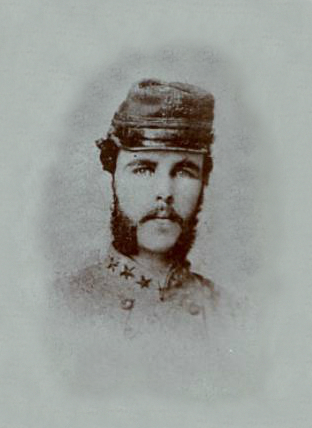
Thomas F. Toon in the Civil War

Thomas Fentress Toon (June 10, 1840 – February 19, 1902) was a brigadier general in the Confederate States Army during the American Civil War.

== Early life ==
Thomas Fentress Toon was born June 10, 1840, in Columbus County, North Carolina, to Anthony F. Toon and Mary McMillian Kelly. He attended Wake Forest College but left school as a senior when the Civil War began.

== Civil War ==
Toon enlisted in a company that became a part of the 20th North Carolina Infantry Regiment. He returned to Wake Forest in June and graduated. Toon was elected his company's first lieutenant and then its captain in July. From 1862 to March 1865, he fought in all the major engagements of the Army of Northern Virginia and suffered seven wounds in the process. Following his performances at the Battle of Seven Pines, in the Seven Days Battles, at the Battle of South Mountain the Battle of Fredericksburg he was elected colonel of the 20th North Carolina on February 26, 1863, when the senior officers in the regiment waived their rights to the command. He led the regiment at the Battle of Chancellorsville, at Gettysburg, and at the Battle of Mine Run in 1863. Toon famously wrote of his brigade's slaughter at Gettysburg under the leadership of Alfred Iverson, Jr., "...initiated at Seven Pines, sacrificed at Gettysburg, surrendered at Appomattox."

During the bloody Overland Campaign of 1864, Toon continued to display solid leadership. When his brigade commander, Brigadier General Robert D. Johnston, was wounded at the Battle of Spotsylvania Courthouse in May, he succeeded to command of the brigade. Following promotion to brigadier general, Toon led the brigade during Lieutenant General Jubal A. Early's July raid on Washington. In August Johnston returned, and Toon reverted to his former rank of Colonel and command of the 20th North Carolina. He led his regiments in the Valley Campaigns of 1864 and during the Siege of Petersburg.

On March 25, 1865, he was severely wounded during the Confederate attack during the Battle of Fort Stedman ending his active duty in the field remainder of the war.

== Post-war career ==
After the war, Toon returned to North Carolina where he lived for the remainder of his life. He was elected superintendent of public instruction for North Carolina in 1900, serving for one year until his death in Raleigh, North Carolina, on February 19, 1902. He is buried at Historic Oakwood Cemetery in Raleigh.

== See also ==
- List of American Civil War generals (Confederate)
