= Calvin H. Wiley =

American novelist (1819–1877)

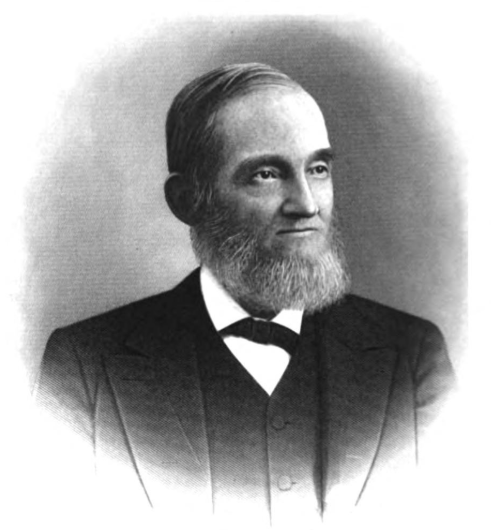

Member of the North Carolina General Assembly
- In office 1850–1852
- Constituency: Guilford County

Personal details
- Born: Calvin Henderson Wiley; February 3, 1819 Guilford County, North Carolina
- Died: January 11, 1887 (aged 67) Winston, North Carolina
- Party: Whig
- Spouse: Mittie Towles (m. 1862)
- Children: 5
- Education: University of North Carolina
- Occupation: Educator; politician; writer

Calvin Henderson Wiley (February 3, 1819 – January 11, 1887) was a North Carolina educator. He was the first superintendent of public schools in the state, as well as a novelist.

== Early life ==
Calvin H. Wiley was born on February 3, 1819, in Guilford County, North Carolina. He graduated from the University of North Carolina in 1840 and was admitted to the bar in 1841.

He married Mittie Towles on February 25, 1862, and they had five children.

== Career ==
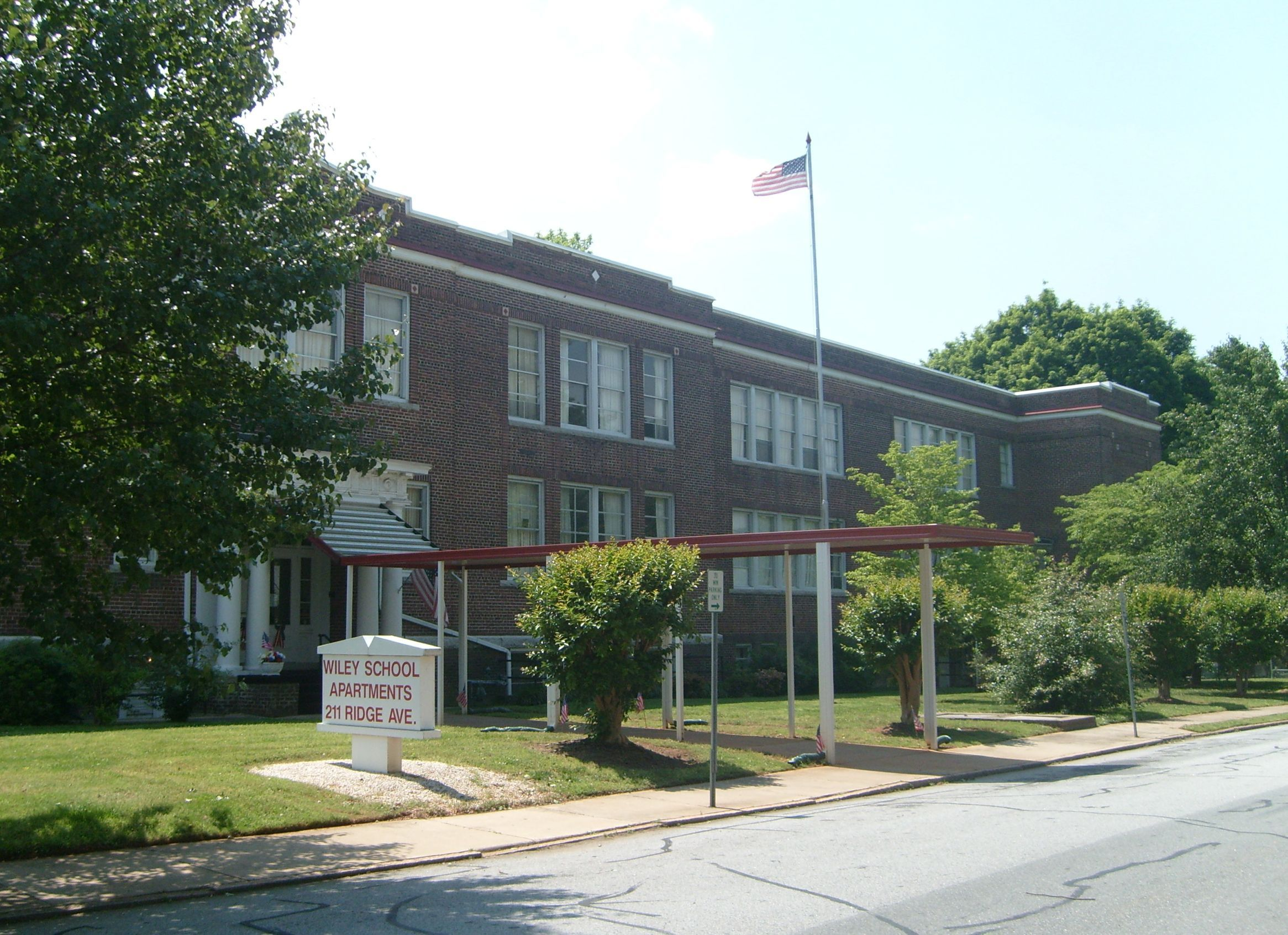
Wiley School Apartments (formerly Calvin H. Wiley School) in Salisbury, North Carolina, USA. On the National Register of Historic Places.

After serving two years in the North Carolina legislature he became superintendent of common schools on January 1, 1853, and served in that office until the end of the Civil War in 1865, when along with all other state officials he was removed from office.

According to Harlow Giles Unger, in 12 years as state superintendent he overcame traditionalistic opposition and set up the modern system of public education in North Carolina. He founded the state education association; helped set up teacher training institutions; imposed standards and examining boards for teachers; mandated annual teacher certification; coordinated county school units with school superintendents and boards; and advocated for universal education as a vehicle for ensuring the state's economic prosperity.

During his term as superintendent he founded and edited the North Carolina Common School Journal in 1856, which lasted only one year but was subsequently put on a firmer footing as the North Carolina Journal of Education. He was ordained as a minister in the Presbyterian Church in 1866.

Wiley wrote two historical romances set in North Carolina during the American revolution, Alamance (1847) and Roanoke (1849). Roanoke was reissued under a number of titles, including Life in the South (1852), Utopia (1851), and Adventures of Old Dan Tucker (1852). The stories incorporate North Carolina traditions, legends, history, and settings. Under the title, Life at the South, Roanoke was given the subtitle A Companion to Uncle Tom's Cabin, in an effort to capture some of the popularity of Harriet Beecher Stowe's famous text.

== Death ==
Wiley died at his home in Winston, North Carolina, in 1887.

== See also ==
- Education in North Carolina
