= North Carolina Annual Conference =

The North Carolina Conference is an Annual Conference (a regional episcopal area, similar to a diocese) of the United Methodist Church. This conference serves the eastern half of the state of North Carolina, with its administrative offices and the office of the bishop located in Garner, North Carolina. It is part of the Southeastern Jurisdictional Conference. The current bishop of the North Carolina Conference is Bishop Connie Mitchell Shelton.

The North Carolina Conference provides funding to three institutions of higher learning:

- Methodist University in Fayetteville, North Carolina
- Louisburg College in Louisburg, North Carolina
- North Carolina Wesleyan College in Rocky Mount, North Carolina.

== Districts ==
The NC Annual Conference is further subdivided into 8 smaller regions, called "districts," which provide further administrative functions for the operation of local churches in cooperation with each other. This structure is vital to Methodism, and is referred to as connectionalism. The Districts that comprise the North Carolina Conference are:

- Beacon
- Capital
- Corridor
- Fairway
- Gateway
- Harbor
- Heritage
- Sound

Prior to July 2012, the North Carolina Conference had 12 districts.

- Burlington
- Durham
- Elizabeth City
- Fayetteville
- Goldsboro
- Greenville
- New Bern
- Raleigh
- Rockingham
- Rocky Mount
- Sanford
- Wilmington

== See also ==
- Annual Conferences of the United Methodist Church
