= Mo Green =

American politician and educator

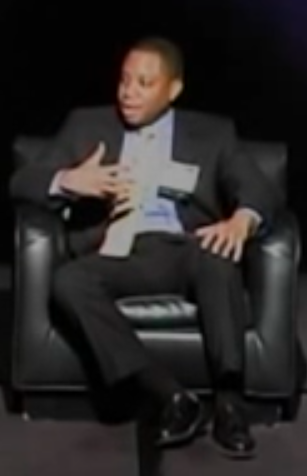
- Green in 2011

22nd North Carolina Superintendent of Public Instruction
- Incumbent
- Assumed office January 1, 2025
- Governor: Josh Stein
- Preceded by: Catherine Truitt

Personal details
- Born: Maurice Green; 1966 or 1967 (age 59–60)
- Party: Democratic
- Education: Duke University (BS, JD)

Maurice O. "Mo" Green (born 1966/1967) is an American educator and politician who has served as the 22nd Superintendent of Public Instruction of North Carolina since January 1, 2025. He was elected to that office for a four-year term in 2024, defeating Michelle Morrow in the general election and becoming the first African-American to hold the office.

== Early life ==
Green was born in New York City. His father died when he was ten, prompting his mother to attend college, become a teacher, and teach disabled students in Georgia. Green is a graduate of Duke University with both a bachelor’s degree in political science and economics and a Juris Doctor degree.

== Career ==
Green served as Superintendent of Guilford County Schools from September 2008 until his resignation in December 2015 to serve as the executive director of the Z. Smith Reynolds Foundation.

He announced in October 2023 that he was running for North Carolina Superintendent of Public Instruction in the 2024 election. He faced former homeschool teacher Michele Morrow, who had previously referred to public schools as "indoctrination centers", in the general election. He received the endorsement of former President Barack Obama due to Morrow calling for Obama to be publicly executed. Green won the election on November 6, 2024, with 51% of the vote. Upon being inaugurated, he became the first African-American to hold the office.

While in office, he has advocated for reforming the "report card" system North Carolina uses to rate public schools, saying that the letter grades given in the reports put too much emphasis on students' test scores.

In 2026, Green announced the creation of a Parent Advisory Council to advise the state government on education-related issues, made up of around sixteen to twenty-four members from all eight State Board of Education regions, with each member serving a two-year term. The council is set to start meeting in November 2026.

Party political offices
Preceded by Jen Mangrum	Democratic nominee for North Carolina Superintendent of Public Instruction; 2024	Most recent
Political offices
Preceded by Catherine Truitt	North Carolina Superintendent of Public Instruction; 2025–present	Incumbent
