= North Carolina Superintendent of Public Instruction =

U.S. state constitutional officer

Superintendent of Public Instruction of North Carolina
- Logo of the North Carolina Department of Public Instruction
- Incumbent; Mo Green since January 1, 2025
- Member of: Council of State
- Seat: Raleigh, North Carolina
- Term length: Four years
- Inaugural holder: Calvin H. Wiley
- Formation: January 1, 1853 (173 years ago)
- Succession: Sixth
- Website: www.dpi.nc.gov

The North Carolina superintendent of public instruction is an elected constitutional officer in the executive branch of the government of the U.S. state of North Carolina. As the head of the North Carolina Department of Public Instruction, the superintendent oversees the public school systems of the state. They also serve as the secretary of the North Carolina State Board of Education and are a member of the North Carolina Council of State. The incumbent is Mo Green, who became superintendent on January 1, 2025.

The position of state superintendent was originally created in 1852 to run the new Department of Public Instruction. The office was abolished in 1865 but reestablished by the 1868 state constitution as a member of the new State Board of Education. The duties of the superintendent have been altered over time by the North Carolina General Assembly. A new state constitution in 1971 designated the superintendent as the secretary of the Board of Education, but removed the office's voting power on the body. The relationship between the superintendent and the board since the 1960s has been characterized by conflict and confusion over their responsibilities.

== History of the office ==
In 1837, the North Carolina General Assembly passed a common school law to combine state and local funds to create a public school system. In 1850, North Carolina Governor Charles Manly appealed to the legislature for the creation of an office with centralized authority over public schools. In 1852, the assembly created the Department of Public Instruction to be led by the superintendent of common schools chosen by legislative appointment. Calvin H. Wiley served in the office from January 1, 1853, until April 25, 1865, when the state declared its offices vacant due to the surrender of the Confederate States of America in the American Civil War. Later that year the General Assembly declined to appropriate state funds for public schools and abolished the position of superintendent, effectively terminating the public school system. (Note: William Woods Holden, who served as interim governor in 1865 following the war, refused to attempt to reappoint Wiley owing to his inability to pass the test oath required to return to public office by the federal government. Governor Jonathan Worth's administration, which arose in 1866, made no efforts towards rebuilding a statewide school system and the office of superintendent due to financial difficulties.) In 1868 the state ratified a new constitution that provided for a system of public schools to be led by a superintendent of public instruction and a State Board of Education, of which the superintendent was an ex officio member and served as the body's secretary. Under this framework, the superintendent was tasked with managing the school system and implementing relevant laws, creating an annual report on education in the state, and studying effective educational techniques in other jurisdictions. The constitution also made the superintendent an ex officio member of the Council of State. During the Reconstruction era, a post of assistant superintendent was also retained. Usually filled by a black appointee, it was responsible for black public schools in the state's racially segregated educational system.

The duties of the superintendent and the structure of the Department of Public Instruction have been altered over time by the General Assembly. In 1933 the legislature placed the superintendent on the new State School Commission, which was responsible for educational financing. The commission was disbanded in 1943. That year, the constitution was amended to revise the composition of the State Board of Education, leaving the superintendent a member but adding several seats to be filled by appointment from the governor, imbuing the body with a rivalling political authority over education policy. Conflict between the superintendent and the rest of the board over the scope of their responsibilities became common in the 1960s and 1970s. A 1968 constitutional study commission recommended making the Board of Education responsible for the selection of the superintendent to reduce voters' burden by shortening the ballot, but this proposal was disregarded by the General Assembly when it rewrote the state constitution in 1971. The new constitution affirmed that the superintendent was the secretary of the State Board of Education and removed the office's membership and voting power on the board. In 1987 another effort was made to make the office appointed by the board in an attempt to simplify governance of the state's educational system. The North Carolina Senate passed a constitutional amendment to that effect with the support of the governor and lieutenant governor but the bill was quashed in a House of Representatives committee. The following year the legislature empowered the superintendent to organize the structure of the Department of Public Instruction, spend its funds, and enter into relevant contracts in the course of its operations. As secretary to the State Board of Education, the superintendent was made responsible for expenditures related to the board's duties and for implementing its policy decisions.

In the 1990s, the Board of Education established the position of deputy superintendent and delegated direct management authority to them. School officials subsequently complained about a lack of clarity in the leadership of the Department of Public Instruction, and the Public School Forum of North Carolina dubbed the system a "four-head monster" under the competing authorities of the superintendent, deputy superintendent, the Board of Education, and the governor. In 1995 the General Assembly passed legislation transferring most of the superintendent's powers to the Board of Education. In 1997 the General Assembly again attempted to amend the constitution to remove the popular election of the superintendent, with the effort narrowly failing by two votes in the North Carolina House of Representatives. "Dual-reporting" positions within the Department of Public Instruction, which encompassed employees who were responsible both to the superintendent and the board, came into frequent use during Bob Etheridge's tenure as the superintendent.

June Atkinson, who was sworn in during 2005, was the first woman elected to the office. In 2007, the Board of Education resolved that the deputy superintendent was responsible to them and possessed the "power and duty...[t]o manage the Department of Public Instruction," thus removing the superintendent's basic control over the department. This position was later countermanded by state legislation. In 2009, Governor Bev Perdue, with the cooperation of the board, attempted to circumvent Atkinson's authority by appointing a chief executive officer to run the Department of Public Instruction, effectively rendering the superintendent a symbolic official. The governor justified her decision by arguing that it was "adding accountability and clear direction to a system that is badly in need of both." Atkinson sued to assert her leadership over the department, and the Wake County Superior Court decided in her favor, ruling that she was in charge of the chief executive officer.

In 2016, the General Assembly passed legislation transferring some of the board's powers to the superintendent. The board sued to block the law, and in 2018 the Supreme Court of North Carolina ruled that the superintendent was responsible "over all matters relating to the direct supervision and administration of the public school system" while also affirming that the board had "ultimate authority under the Constitution to supervise and administer the state's public school system" and that the board can determine "the mechanics of the relationship between the Board and the Superintendent, as well as how their respective departments will operate internally." In wake of the decision, Superintendent Mark Johnson eliminated dual reporting positions, making all such employees responsible only to him. The incumbent, Mo Green, was sworn in to the office on January 1, 2025. He is the first black person to hold the office.

== Duties and structure ==
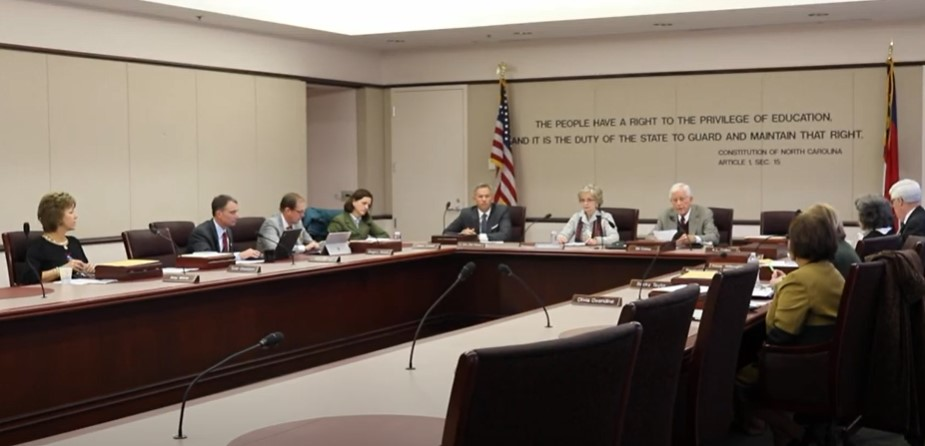
Meeting of the North Carolina State Board of Education in 2016 with Superintendent June Atkinson attending. The superintendent serves as the board's secretary.

The superintendent of public instruction is the only constitutional officer in North Carolina assigned responsibilities solely concerning public education. The office holder is not subject to term limits. In the event of a vacancy in the office, the Governor of North Carolina has the authority to appoint a successor until a candidate is elected at the next general election for members of the General Assembly. Per Article III, Section 8 of the constitution, the superintendent sits on the Council of State. The State Board of Education is responsible for setting education policy, and the superintendent serves as the board's secretary and chief administrative officer. The superintendent is not themselves a formal member of the board. The state constitution does not fully delineate the administrative responsibilities of the board and the superintendent, and leaves the latter's duties to be determined by state law. The superintendent is empowered by general statute to appoint a local school system superintendent to serve as one of eight advisory members on the board. As board secretary, the superintendent is responsible for managing the board's funds and its aid appropriations to local school boards. They also keep the board informed on public education matters, make recommendations to it, and keep its minutes. They are also required to report to the governor on the state of public education in North Carolina 30 days before each regular session of the legislature. They are an ex officio member of several state boards and commissions, including the statutory education cabinet. They are seventh in the line of succession to the governor.

The superintendent manages the Department of Public Instruction. The department is divided into three sections each under the leadership of an assistant superintendent: Instructional and Accountability Services, Information and Technology Services, and Financial and Personnel Services. As of December 2022, the department has 886 employees retained under the terms of the State Human Resources Act. As of October 2022, two officers in the department—an internal auditor and the Director of Board Operations and Policy—report directly to both the superintendent and the Board of Education. As with all Council of State officers, the superintendent's salary is fixed by the General Assembly and cannot be reduced during their term of office. As of 2025, the superintendent's annual salary is $168,384. They maintain an office in the Department of Public Instruction building.

== List of superintendents of public instruction ==
Superintendents of common schools
| No. | Superintendent | Term in office | Source |
|---|---|---|---|
| 1 | Calvin H. Wiley | 1853 – 1865 | |

Superintendents of public instruction
| No. | Superintendent | Term in office | Party | Source |
|---|---|---|---|---|
| 1 | Samuel S. Ashley | 1868 – 1871 | Republican | |
| 2 | Alexander McIver (Note: James C. Reid was appointed to the office of superintendent by Governor Tod Robinson Caldwell in 1872 or 1873, but there is no evidence he ever assumed the position. Caldwell then appointed Kemp P. Battle to the post in January 1873, and he was sworn-in on January 15. McIver, who was still serving, sued to keep his appointment, and the Supreme Court of North Carolina ruled that he was entitled to remain at his post and that Battle could not unseat him.) | 1871 – 1875 | Republican | |
| 3 | Stephen D. Pool | 1875 – 1876 | Democratic | |
| 4 | John Pool | 1876 – 1877 | Republican | |
| 5 | John C. Scarborough | 1877 – 1885 | Democratic | |
| 6 | Sidney M. Finger | 1885 – 1893 | Democratic | |
| 7 | John C. Scarborough | 1893 – 1897 | Democratic | |
| 8 | Charles H. Mebane | 1897 – 1901 | Republican | |
| 9 | Thomas F. Toon | 1901 – 1902 | Democratic | |
| 10 | James Y. Joyner | 1902 – 1919 | Democratic | |
| 11 | Eugene C. Brooks | 1919 – 1923 | Democratic | |
| 12 | Arch T. Allen | 1923 – 1934 | Democratic | |
| 13 | Clyde A. Erwin | 1934 – 1952 | Democratic | |
| 14 | Charles F. Carroll | 1952 – 1969 | Democratic | |
| 15 | A. Craig Phillips | 1969 – 1989 | Democratic | |
| 16 | Bob Etheridge | 1989 – 1996 | Democratic | |
| 17 | Michael E. Ward | 1996 – 2004 | Democratic | |
| 18 | Patricia N. Willoughby | 2004 – 2005 | | |
| 19 | June Atkinson | 2005 – 2016 | Democratic | |
| 20 | Mark Johnson | 2017 – 2021 | Republican | |
| 21 | Catherine Truitt | 2021 – 2025 | Republican | |
| 22 | Mo Green | 2025 – present | Democratic | |

== Works cited ==
- Balanoff, Elizabeth (January 1972). "Negro Legislators in the North Carolina General Assembly, July, 1868-February, 1872". The North Carolina Historical Review. 49 (1): 22–55. JSTOR 23529002.
- Baxter, Andy (September 1990). "A Short Constitutional History of Public School Governance in North Carolina, 1776-1990" (PDF). N.C. Insight. Vol. 12, no. 4. N.C. Center for Public Policy Research. pp. 13–14.
- Betts, Jack (September 1990). "The Superintendent of Public Instruction: Should North Carolina's Chief Public School Officer Be Appointed or Elected?" (PDF). N.C. Insight. Vol. 12, no. 4. N.C. Center for Public Policy Research. pp. 2–4.
- Blackburn, Dylan R. (January 2023). "Who's in Charge?: The Constitutional Confusion Challenging North Carolina's Public School System". North Carolina Law Review. 101 (2): 517–568.
- Guillory, Ferrel (June 1988). "The Council of State and North Carolina's Long Ballot : A Tradition Hard to Change" (PDF). N.C. Insight. N.C. Center for Public Policy Research. pp. 40–44.
- North Carolina Manual (PDF). Raleigh: North Carolina Department of the Secretary of State. 2011. OCLC 2623953. Archived from the original (PDF) on 2023-08-02.
- Orth, John V.; Newby, Paul M. (2013). The North Carolina State Constitution (second ed.). Oxford University Press. ISBN 9780199300655.
- Raper, Horace W. (1985). William W. Holden: North Carolina's Political Enigma. Chapel Hill: University of North Carolina Press. ISBN 0807850608.
