= List of United States federal courthouses in North Carolina =

Following is a list of current and former courthouses of the United States federal court system located in North Carolina. Each entry indicates the name of the building along with an image, if available, its location and the jurisdiction it covers, the dates during which it was used for each such jurisdiction, and, if applicable the person for whom it was named, and the date of renaming. Dates of use will not necessarily correspond with the dates of construction or demolition of a building, as pre-existing structures may be adapted or court use, and former court buildings may later be put to other uses. Also, the official name of the building may be changed at some point after its use as a federal court building has been initiated.

== Courthouses ==
Courthouse	City	Image	Street address	Jurisdiction	Dates of use	Named for
U.S. Post Office and Court House	Asheville		?	W.D.N.C. 4th Cir.	1892–ca. 1930; Razed ca. 1930.	n/a
Federal Building and U.S. Courthouse	Asheville		100 Otis Street	W.D.N.C. 4th Cir.	1930–present	n/a
Federal Building	Bryson City		50 Main Street	W.D.N.C.	1963–? Still in use as a federal office building.	n/a
U.S. Court House & Post Office	Charlotte		West Trade St.	W.D.N.C.	1891–1913; Razed in 1913.	n/a
Charles R. Jonas Federal Building†	Charlotte		401 West Trade Street	W.D.N.C.	1915–present Sold to the city in 2005; leased thereafter.	U.S. Rep. Charles R. Jonas
John Hervey Wheeler U.S. Courthouse	Durham		323 East Chapel Hill Street	M.D.N.C.	1936–present	John Hervey Wheeler
J. Herbert W. Small Federal Building and U.S. Courthouse	Elizabeth City		306 East Main Street	E.D.N.C.	1906–present	J. Herbert W. Small (2009)
Federal Building, U.S. Post Office and Courthouse	Fayetteville		301 Green Street	E.D.N.C.	1966–present	n/a
U.S. Court House & Post Office	Greensboro		101 S. Elm St.	W.D.N.C. M.D.N.C.	1887–1933; Razed ca. 1938.	n/a
L. Richardson Preyer Federal Building†	Greensboro		324 West Market Street	M.D.N.C.	1933–present	U.S. Rep. and District Court judge L. Richardson Preyer (1988)
U.S. Courthouse	Greenville		201 Evans Street	E.D.N.C.	?–present	n/a
Federal Building†	Greenville		215 Evans Street	E.D.N.C.	?–present Completed in 1914.	n/a
U.S. Bankruptcy Court	Greenville		150 Reade Circle	E.D.N.C.	?–present	n/a
U.S. Post Office, Courthouse, & Custom House†	New Bern		300 Pollock Street	E.D.N.C.	1897–1935; Now New Bern City Hall.	n/a
U.S. Post Office & Courthouse	New Bern		413 Middle Street	E.D.N.C.	1935–present	n/a
Federal Building & Post Office Century Station†	Raleigh		314 Fayetteville Street Mall	E.D.N.C.	1912–present Construction completed in 1879.	n/a
Terry Sanford Federal Building and Courthouse	Raleigh		310 New Bern Avenue	E.D.N.C.	?–present	U.S. Senator Terry Sanford
U.S. Post Office and Federal Building†	Rockingham		125 South Hancock Street	M.D.N.C.	1935–1980; Now owned by Richmond County.	n/a
U.S. Post Office	Salisbury		130 West Innes Street	W.D.N.C. M.D.N.C.	1911–1980; Now Rowan County administrative offices.	n/a
U.S. Court House & Post Office†	Statesville		227 South Center Street	W.D.N.C.	1891–1939; Now Statesville City Hall.	n/a
U.S. Post Office and Courthouse	Statesville		200 West Broad Street	W.D.N.C.	1939–present	n/a
U.S. Post Office & Court House	Washington		102 East 2nd Street	E.D.N.C.	1913–1992; Now the Municipal Building.	n/a
U.S. Post Office & Court House†	Wilkesboro		201 West Main Street	W.D.N.C. M.D.N.C.	1917–1980; Now an office building.	n/a
Johnson J. Hayes Federal Building	Wilkesboro		207 West Main Street	M.D.N.C.	1969–ca. 2012	Johnson Jay Hayes
U.S. Custom House	Wilmington		N. Water between Princess & Market	D.N.C. E.D.N.C.	1846–1891; Razed ca. 1914.	n/a
U.S. Post Office & Custom House	Wilmington		Front & Chestnut Sts.	E.D.N.C.	1891–1919; Razed in 1936.	n/a
Alton Lennon Federal Building and Courthouse†	Wilmington		2 Princess Street	E.D.N.C.	1919–present	U.S. Senator Alton Asa Lennon
U.S. Post Office and Courthouse	Wilson		224 East Nash Street	E.D.N.C.	1928–? Now the Imagination Station Science Museum.	n/a
U.S. Post Office	Winston-Salem		101 West 5th Street	W.D.N.C. M.D.N.C.	1926–1976; Now the Millennium Center.	n/a
Hiram H. Ward Federal Building and U.S. Courthouse	Winston-Salem		251 North Main Street	M.D.N.C.	1976–present	District Court judge Hiram Hamilton Ward

== Key ==
^{†}	Listed on the National Register of Historic Places (NRHP)
