= Norwood Carlton Tilley Jr. =

American judge (born 1943)

Senior Judge of the United States District Court for the Middle District of North Carolina
- Incumbent
- Assumed office December 16, 2008

Chief Judge of the United States District Court for the Middle District of North Carolina
- In office 1999–2006
- Preceded by: Frank William Bullock Jr.
- Succeeded by: James A. Beaty Jr.

Judge of the United States District Court for the Middle District of North Carolina
- In office October 17, 1988 – December 16, 2008
- Appointed by: Ronald Reagan
- Preceded by: Hiram Hamilton Ward
- Succeeded by: Catherine Eagles

Personal details
- Born: Norwood Carlton Tilley Jr. December 16, 1943 (age 82) Rock Hill, South Carolina, U.S.
- Education: Wake Forest University (BS, JD)

Norwood Carlton Tilley Jr. (born December 16, 1943) is a senior United States district judge of the United States District Court for the Middle District of North Carolina.

== Education and career ==
Tilley was born in Rock Hill, South Carolina. He received a Bachelor of Science degree from Wake Forest University in 1966 and a Juris Doctor from Wake Forest University School of Law in 1969. He was a law clerk for Judge Eugene Andrew Gordon of the United States District Court for the Middle District of North Carolina from 1969 to 1971. He was an assistant United States attorney of the Middle District of North Carolina from 1971 to 1974. He was the United States Attorney for the Middle District of North Carolina from 1974 to 1977. He was in private practice in Greensboro, North Carolina from 1977 to 1988.

=== Federal judicial service ===
Tilley was nominated by President Ronald Reagan on April 26, 1988, to a seat on the United States District Court for the Middle District of North Carolina vacated by Judge Hiram Hamilton Ward. He was confirmed by the United States Senate on October 14, 1988, and received his commission on October 17, 1988. He served as Chief Judge from 1999 to 2006. He assumed senior status on December 16, 2008.

=== Notable cases ===
Tilley was the judge who decided Yacovelli v. Moeser (2002).

== Sources ==
Legal offices
| Preceded by Hiram Hamilton Ward | Judge of the United States District Court for the Middle District of North Carolina; 1988–2008 | Succeeded by Catherine Eagles |
| Preceded by Frank William Bullock Jr. | Chief Judge of the United States District Court for the Middle District of North Carolina; 1999–2006 | Succeeded by James A. Beaty Jr. |
