= List of African American federal judges =

This is a list of African Americans who have served as United States federal judges. As of June 18, 2026, 304 African-Americans have served on the federal bench.

== United States Supreme Court ==
#	Justice	Seat	State	Began service	Ended service	Reason for termination	Appointed by
1	Thurgood Marshall	10	MD	August 30, 1967	October 1, 1991	retirement	Johnson
2	Clarence Thomas	10	GA	October 23, 1991	Incumbent	—	G.H.W. Bush
3	Ketanji Brown Jackson	2	FL	June 30, 2022	Incumbent	—	Biden

== United States Courts of Appeals ==
#	Judge	Circuit	State	Began active service	Ended active service	Ended senior status	Reason for termination	Appointed by
1	William H. Hastie	Third	VI	October 21, 1949	May 31, 1971	April 14, 1976	death	Truman
2	Thurgood Marshall	Second	MD	October 5, 1961	August 23, 1965	—	appointed Solicitor General	Kennedy
3	Wade H. McCree	Sixth	MI	September 7, 1966	March 28, 1977	—	appointed Solicitor General	Johnson
4	Spottswood W. Robinson III	D.C.	DC	November 3, 1966	September 1, 1989	October 11, 1998	death	Johnson
5	A. Leon Higginbotham Jr.	Third	PA	October 11, 1977	January 31, 1991	March 5, 1993	retirement	Carter
6	Damon Keith	Sixth	MI	October 21, 1977	May 1, 1995	April 28, 2019	death	Carter
7	Theodore McMillian	Eighth	MO	September 23, 1978	July 1, 2003	January 18, 2006	death	Carter
8	Amalya Lyle Kearse	Second	NY	June 21, 1979	June 11, 2002	Incumbent	—	Carter
9	Joseph W. Hatchett	Fifth	FL	July 13, 1979	October 1, 1981	—	reassigned to Eleventh Cir.	Carter
9	Joseph W. Hatchett	Eleventh	FL	October 1, 1981	May 14, 1999	—	retirement	Carter
10	Jerome Farris	Ninth	WA	September 27, 1979	March 4, 1995	July 23, 2020	death	Carter
11	Nathaniel R. Jones	Sixth	OH	October 5, 1979	May 13, 1995	March 30, 2002	retirement	Carter
12	Cecil F. Poole	Ninth	CA	November 27, 1979	January 15, 1996	November 12, 1997	death	Carter
13	Harry T. Edwards	D.C.	DC	February 20, 1980	November 3, 2005	Incumbent	—	Carter
14	Lawrence W. Pierce	Second	NY	November 18, 1981	January 1, 1990	March 31, 1995	retirement	Reagan
15	Clarence Thomas	D.C.	DC	March 12, 1990	October 23, 1991	—	elevation to Supreme Court	G.H.W. Bush
16	Timothy K. Lewis	Third	PA	October 9, 1992	June 30, 1999	—	resignation	G.H.W. Bush
17	Judith W. Rogers	D.C.	DC	March 11, 1994	September 1, 2022	Incumbent	—	Clinton
18	Carl E. Stewart	Fifth	LA	May 9, 1994	Incumbent	—	—	Clinton
19	Theodore McKee	Third	PA	June 9, 1994	October 20, 2022	Incumbent	—	Clinton
20	R. Guy Cole Jr.	Sixth	OH	December 26, 1995	January 9, 2023	Incumbent	—	Clinton
21	Eric L. Clay	Sixth	MI	August 1, 1997	Incumbent	—	—	Clinton
22	Charles R. Wilson	Eleventh	FL	August 9, 1999	December 31, 2024	Incumbent	—	Clinton
23	Ann Claire Williams	Seventh	IL	November 15, 1999	June 5, 2017	January 16, 2018	retirement	Clinton
24	Johnnie B. Rawlinson	Ninth	NV	July 26, 2000	Incumbent	—	—	Clinton
25	Roger Gregory	Fourth	VA	December 27, 2000	Incumbent	—	—	Clinton; G.W. Bush (Note: Recess appointment by Bill Clinton, re-appointed by George W. Bush after being confirmed by the United States Senate at a later date.)
26	Barrington D. Parker Jr.	Second	NY	October 16, 2001	October 10, 2009	Incumbent	—	G.W. Bush
27	Lavenski Smith	Eighth	AR	July 19, 2002	Incumbent	—	—	G.W. Bush
28	Allyson K. Duncan	Fourth	NC	August 15, 2003	March 21, 2019	July 31, 2019	retirement	G.W. Bush
29	Janice Rogers Brown	D.C.	DC	June 10, 2005	August 31, 2017	—	retirement	G.W. Bush
30	Jerome Holmes	Tenth	OK	August 9, 2006	Incumbent	—	—	G.W. Bush
31	Andre M. Davis	Fourth	MD	November 10, 2009	February 28, 2014	August 31, 2017	retirement	Obama
32	Joseph A. Greenaway Jr.	Third	NJ	February 12, 2010	June 15, 2023	—	retirement	Obama
33	O. Rogeriee Thompson	First	RI	March 30, 2010	September 21, 2022	Incumbent	—	Obama
34	James Andrew Wynn	Fourth	NC	August 10, 2010	Incumbent	—	—	Obama
35	Raymond Lohier	Second	NY	December 20, 2010	Incumbent	—	—	Obama
36	James E. Graves Jr.	Fifth	MS	February 15, 2011	Incumbent	—	—	Obama
37	Bernice B. Donald	Sixth	TN	September 8, 2011	September 27, 2022	January 20, 2023	retirement	Obama
38	Paul J. Watford	Ninth	CA	May 22, 2012	May 31, 2023	—	resignation	Obama
39	Robert L. Wilkins	D.C.	DC	January 15, 2014	Incumbent	—	—	Obama
40	Ketanji Brown Jackson	D.C.	DC	June 17, 2021	June 29, 2022	—	elevation to Supreme Court	Biden
41	Candace Jackson-Akiwumi	Seventh	IL	July 1, 2021	Incumbent	—	—	Biden
42	Tiffany P. Cunningham	Federal	DC	August 6, 2021	Incumbent	—	—	Biden
43	Eunice C. Lee	Second	NY	August 16, 2021	Incumbent	—	—	Biden
44	Holly A. Thomas	Ninth	CA	January 24, 2022	Incumbent	—	—	Biden
45	Stephanie D. Davis	Sixth	MI	June 14, 2022	Incumbent	—	—	Biden
46	J. Michelle Childs	D.C.	DC	July 25, 2022	Incumbent	—	—	Biden
47	Andre Mathis	Sixth	TN	September 27, 2022	Incumbent	—	—	Biden
48	Arianna J. Freeman	Third	PA	October 20, 2022	Incumbent	—	—	Biden
49	Doris Pryor	Seventh	IN	December 9, 2022	Incumbent	—	—	Biden
50	Tamika Montgomery-Reeves	Third	DE	February 7, 2023	Incumbent	—	—	Biden
51	Dana Douglas	Fifth	LA	December 16, 2022	Incumbent	—	—	Biden
52	DeAndrea G. Benjamin	Fourth	SC	February 21, 2023	Incumbent	—	—	Biden
53	Nancy Abudu	Eleventh	GA	May 26, 2023	Incumbent	—	—	Biden
54	Embry Kidd	Eleventh	GA	January 2, 2025	Incumbent	—	—	Biden

== United States District Courts ==
#	Judge	District	Began active service	Ended active service	Ended senior status	Reason for termination	Appointed by
1	James Benton Parsons	N.D. Ill.	August 30, 1961	August 30, 1981	June 19, 1993	death	Kennedy
2	Wade H. McCree	E.D. Mich.	September 29, 1961	September 13, 1966	—	elevation to Sixth Circuit	Kennedy
3	Spottswood W. Robinson III	D.D.C.	January 6, 1964	November 8, 1966	—	elevation to D.C. Circuit	Johnson
4	A. Leon Higginbotham Jr.	E.D. Pa.	March 17, 1964	November 7, 1977	—	elevation to Third Circuit	Johnson
5	William B. Bryant	D.D.C.	August 11, 1965	January 31, 1982	November 13, 2005	death	Johnson
6	Constance Baker Motley	S.D.N.Y.	August 30, 1966	September 26, 1986	September 28, 2005	death	Johnson
7	Aubrey E. Robinson Jr.	D.D.C.	November 3, 1966	March 1, 1992	February 27, 2000	death	Johnson
8	Joseph Cornelius Waddy	D.D.C.	March 4, 1967	August 1, 1978	—	death	Johnson
9	Damon Keith	E.D. Mich.	October 12, 1967	November 22, 1977	—	elevation to Sixth Circuit	Johnson
10	David W. Williams	C.D. Cal.	June 20, 1969	January 17, 1981	May 6, 2000	death	Nixon
11	Barrington D. Parker	D.D.C.	December 19, 1969	December 19, 1985	June 2, 1993	death	Nixon
12	Lawrence W. Pierce	S.D.N.Y.	May 20, 1971	November 30, 1981	—	elevation to Second Circuit	Nixon
13	Clifford Scott Green	E.D. Pa.	December 9, 1971	April 2, 1988	May 31, 2007	death	Nixon
14	Robert L. Carter	S.D.N.Y.	July 25, 1972	December 31, 1986	January 3, 2012	death	Nixon
15	Robert Morton Duncan	S.D. Ohio	June 20, 1974	April 15, 1985	—	resignation	Nixon
16	Henry Bramwell	E.D.N.Y.	December 26, 1974	October 1, 1987	May 28, 2010	death	Ford
17	George N. Leighton	N.D. Ill.	February 4, 1976	February 27, 1986	December 1, 1987	retirement	Ford
18	Cecil F. Poole	N.D. Cal.	July 23, 1976	March 31, 1980	—	elevation to Ninth Circuit	Ford
19	Paul Allen Simmons	W.D. Pa.	April 7, 1978	June 1, 1990	October 9, 2014	death	Carter
20	Robert Frederick Collins	E.D. La.	May 19, 1978	August 6, 1993	—	resignation	Carter
21	Jack Edward Tanner	E.D. Wash.	May 19, 1978	November 8, 1978	—	seat abolished	Carter
21	Jack Edward Tanner	W.D. Wash.	May 19, 1978	January 28, 1991	January 10, 2006	death	Carter
22	Mary Johnson Lowe	S.D.N.Y.	June 27, 1978	July 27, 1991	February 27, 1999	death	Carter
23	Julian A. Cook	E.D. Mich.	September 23, 1978	December 30, 1996	May 16, 2017	death	Carter
24	David Sutherland Nelson	D. Mass.	March 23, 1979	September 27, 1991	October 21, 1998	death	Carter
25	John Garrett Penn	D.D.C.	March 23, 1979	March 31, 1998	September 9, 2007	death	Carter
26	Gabrielle Kirk McDonald	S.D. Tex.	May 11, 1979	August 14, 1988	—	resignation	Carter
27	Matthew J. Perry	D.S.C.	September 20, 1979	October 1, 1995	July 29, 2011	death	Carter
28	Benjamin F. Gibson	W.D. Mich.	September 26, 1979	July 13, 1996	January 31, 1999	retirement	Carter
29	Joseph C. Howard Sr.	D. Md.	October 5, 1979	November 15, 1991	September 16, 2000	death	Carter
30	Alcee Hastings	S.D. Fla.	November 2, 1979	October 20, 1989	—	impeachment and removal	Carter
31	Anna Diggs Taylor	E.D. Mich.	November 2, 1979	December 31, 1998	November 4, 2017	death	Carter
32	Anne Elise Thompson	D.N.J.	November 2, 1979	June 1, 2001	Incumbent	—	Carter
33	James T. Giles	E.D. Pa.	November 27, 1979	February 11, 2008	October 3, 2008	retirement	Carter
34	Horace Ward	N.D. Ga.	December 6, 1979	December 31, 1993	April 23, 2016	death	Carter
35	Terry J. Hatter Jr.	C.D. Cal.	December 20, 1979	April 22, 2005	Incumbent	—	Carter
36	Odell Horton	W.D. Tenn.	May 12, 1980	May 16, 1995	February 22, 2006	death	Carter
37	Norma Holloway Johnson	D.D.C.	May 12, 1980	June 18, 2001	December 31, 2003	retirement	Carter
38	Clyde S. Cahill Jr.	E.D. Mo.	May 23, 1980	April 9, 1992	August 18, 2004	death	Carter
39	George Washington White	N.D. Ohio	May 23, 1980	February 26, 1999	November 12, 2011	death	Carter
40	U. W. Clemon	N.D. Ala.	June 30, 1980	January 31, 2009	—	resignation	Carter
41	Thelton Henderson	N.D. Cal.	June 30, 1980	November 28, 1998	Incumbent	—	Carter
42	Earl Ben Gilliam	S.D. Cal.	August 20, 1980	April 2, 1993	January 28, 2001	death	Carter
43	Myron H. Thompson	M.D. Ala.	September 29, 1980	August 22, 2013	Incumbent	—	Carter
44	Richard Erwin	M.D.N.C.	September 30, 1980	September 22, 1992	November 7, 2006	death	Carter
45	George Howard Jr.	E.D. Ark.	September 30, 1980	April 21, 2007	—	death	Carter
45	George Howard Jr.	W.D. Ark.	September 30, 1980	December 1, 1990	—	seat abolished	Carter
46	Consuelo Bland Marshall	C.D. Cal.	September 30, 1980	October 24, 2005	Incumbent	—	Carter
47	John R. Hargrove Sr.	D. Md.	February 10, 1984	February 21, 1994	April 1, 1997	death	Reagan
48	Ann Claire Williams	N.D. Ill.	April 4, 1985	November 7, 1999	—	elevation to Seventh Circuit	Reagan
49	Henry Travillion Wingate	S.D. Miss.	October 17, 1985	Incumbent	—	—	Reagan
50	James R. Spencer	E.D. Va.	October 14, 1986	March 25, 2014	June 2, 2017	retirement	Reagan
51	Kenneth M. Hoyt	S.D. Tex.	April 1, 1988	March 2, 2013	Incumbent	—	Reagan
52	Herbert J. Hutton	E.D. Pa.	August 12, 1988	September 6, 2003	April 8, 2007	death	Reagan
53	James Ware	N.D. Cal.	October 1, 1990	August 31, 2012	—	resignation	G. H. W. Bush
54	Saundra Brown Armstrong	N.D. Cal.	June 18, 1991	March 23, 2012	Incumbent	—	G. H. W. Bush
55	Timothy K. Lewis	W.D. Pa.	June 18, 1991	October 23, 1992	—	elevation to Third Circuit	G. H. W. Bush
56	Sterling Johnson Jr.	E.D.N.Y.	July 2, 1991	June 1, 2003	October 10, 2022	death	G. H. W. Bush
57	Fernando J. Gaitan Jr.	W.D. Mo.	August 2, 1991	June 3, 2014	Incumbent	—	G. H. W. Bush
58	Donald L. Graham	S.D. Fla.	September 16, 1991	December 15, 2013	Incumbent	—	G. H. W. Bush
59	Joe Billy McDade	C.D. Ill.	November 25, 1991	February 28, 2010	Incumbent	—	G. H. W. Bush
60	Garland E. Burrell Jr.	E.D. Cal.	March 2, 1992	July 4, 2012	Incumbent	—	G. H. W. Bush
61	J. Curtis Joyner	E.D. Pa.	April 13, 1992	May 1, 2013	September 15, 2021	retirement	G. H. W. Bush
62	Carol E. Jackson	E.D. Mo.	August 17, 1992	August 31, 2017	—	resignation	G. H. W. Bush
63	Wilkie D. Ferguson	S.D. Fla.	November 22, 1993	June 9, 2003	—	death	Clinton
64	Raymond Alvin Jackson	E.D. Va.	November 22, 1993	November 23, 2021	Incumbent	—	Clinton
65	Charles Alexander Shaw	E.D. Mo.	November 22, 1993	December 31, 2009	April 12, 2020	death	Clinton
66	Henry Lee Adams Jr.	M.D. Fla.	November 24, 1993	April 8, 2010	Incumbent	—	Clinton
67	Gary L. Lancaster	W.D. Pa.	November 24, 1993	April 13, 2013	—	death	Clinton
68	Reginald C. Lindsay	D. Mass.	November 24, 1993	March 12, 2009	—	death	Clinton
69	Frank Burgess	W.D. Wash.	March 28, 1994	March 9, 2005	March 26, 2010	death	Clinton
70	Michael J. Davis	D. Minn.	March 28, 1994	August 1, 2015	Incumbent	—	Clinton
71	Ancer L. Haggerty	D. Ore.	March 28, 1994	August 26, 2009	Incumbent	—	Clinton
72	Deborah Batts	S.D.N.Y.	May 9, 1994	April 13, 2012	February 3, 2020	death	Clinton
73	Audrey B. Collins	C.D. Cal.	May 9, 1994	August 1, 2014	—	resignation	Clinton
74	Clarence Cooper	N.D. Ga.	May 9, 1994	February 9, 2009	Incumbent	—	Clinton
75	Solomon Oliver Jr.	N.D. Ohio	May 9, 1994	February 15, 2021	Incumbent	—	Clinton
76	Willie Louis Sands	M.D. Ga.	May 9, 1994	April 12, 2014	Incumbent	—	Clinton
77	Vanessa Gilmore	S.D. Tex.	June 9, 1994	January 2, 2022	—	retirement	Clinton
78	Denise Page Hood	E.D. Mich.	June 16, 1994	May 1, 2022	Incumbent	—	Clinton
79	Emmet G. Sullivan	D.D.C.	June 16, 1994	April 3, 2021	Incumbent	—	Clinton
80	Blanche M. Manning	N.D. Ill.	August 10, 1994	February 1, 2010	September 20, 2020	death	Clinton
81	Alexander Williams Jr.	D. Md.	August 18, 1994	May 8, 2013	January 3, 2014	retirement	Clinton
82	Napoleon A. Jones Jr.	S.D. Cal.	September 15, 1994	September 19, 2007	December 12, 2009	death	Clinton
83	Barrington D. Parker Jr.	S.D.N.Y.	September 15, 1994	October 18, 2001	—	elevation to Second Circuit	Clinton
84	David H. Coar	N.D. Ill.	October 7, 1994	August 12, 2009	December 31, 2010	retirement	Clinton
85	James A. Beaty Jr.	M.D.N.C.	October 11, 1994	June 30, 2014	January 31, 2018	retirement	Clinton
86	Okla Jones II	E.D. La.	October 11, 1994	January 8, 1996	—	death	Clinton
87	Alvin W. Thompson	D. Conn.	October 11, 1994	August 31, 2018	Incumbent	—	Clinton
88	William H. Walls	D.N.J.	October 11, 1994	January 31, 2005	July 11, 2019	death	Clinton
89	Vicki Miles-LaGrange	W.D. Okla.	November 28, 1994	November 5, 2018	Incumbent	—	Clinton
90	Curtis Lynn Collier	E.D. Tenn.	May 10, 1995	October 31, 2014	Incumbent	—	Clinton
91	Wiley Young Daniel	D. Colo.	June 30, 1995	January 1, 2013	May 10, 2019	death	Clinton
92	Andre M. Davis	D. Md.	August 14, 1995	November 12, 2009	—	elevation to Fourth Circuit	Clinton
93	Bernice B. Donald	W.D. Tenn.	December 26, 1995	September 8, 2011	retirement	elevation to Sixth Circuit	Clinton
94	Joseph A. Greenaway Jr.	D.N.J.	July 26, 1996	February 24, 2010	—	elevation to Third Circuit	Clinton
95	Charles N. Clevert Jr.	E.D. Wis.	July 29, 1996	October 31, 2012	May 31, 2017	retirement	Clinton
96	Henry H. Kennedy Jr.	D.D.C.	September 18, 1997	November 18, 2011	Incumbent	—	Clinton
97	Algenon L. Marbley	S.D. Ohio	November 7, 1997	Incumbent	—	—	Clinton
98	Martin Jenkins	N.D. Cal.	November 12, 1997	April 3, 2008	—	resignation	Clinton
99	Sam A. Lindsay	N.D. Tex.	March 17, 1998	Incumbent	—	—	Clinton
100	Johnnie B. Rawlinson	D. Nev.	April 7, 1998	July 26, 2000	—	elevation to Ninth Circuit	Clinton
101	Ivan L. R. Lemelle	E.D. La.	April 7, 1998	June 29, 2015	Incumbent	—	Clinton
102	Gregory M. Sleet	D. Del.	April 30, 1998	May 1, 2017	September 28, 2018	retirement	Clinton
103	Stephan P. Mickle	N.D. Fla.	May 22, 1998	June 22, 2011	January 26, 2021	death	Clinton
104	Richard W. Roberts	D.D.C.	June 23, 1998	March 16, 2016	Incumbent	—	Clinton
105	Victoria A. Roberts	E.D. Mich.	June 29, 1998	February 24, 2021	September 1, 2023	retirement	Clinton
106	Raner Collins	D. Ariz.	August 3, 1998	March 4, 2019	Incumbent	—	Clinton
107	Ralph E. Tyson	M.D. La.	August 3, 1998	July 18, 2011	—	death	Clinton
108	Gerald Bruce Lee	E.D. Va.	October 1, 1998	September 30, 2017	—	resignation	Clinton
109	Margaret B. Seymour	D.S.C.	October 22, 1998	January 16, 2013	August 31, 2022	retirement	Clinton
110	William J. Hibbler	N.D. Ill.	April 22, 1999	March 19, 2012	—	death	Clinton
111	William Joseph Haynes Jr.	M.D. Tenn.	November 15, 1999	December 1, 2014	January 16, 2017	retirement	Clinton
112	George B. Daniels	S.D.N.Y.	March 9, 2000	May 1, 2021	Incumbent	—	Clinton
113	Phyllis J. Hamilton	N.D. Cal.	May 25, 2000	February 1, 2021	Incumbent	—	Clinton
114	Petrese B. Tucker	E.D. Pa.	June 1, 2000	June 1, 2021	Incumbent	—	Clinton
115	Laura Taylor Swain	S.D.N.Y.	July 11, 2000	Incumbent	—	—	Clinton
116	Reggie Walton	D.D.C.	September 24, 2001	December 31, 2015	Incumbent	—	G.W. Bush
117	Julie A. Robinson	D. Kan.	December 13, 2001	January 14, 2022	Incumbent	—	G.W. Bush
118	Legrome D. Davis	E.D. Pa.	April 23, 2002	September 28, 2017	Incumbent	—	G.W. Bush
119	Percy Anderson	C.D. Cal.	May 1, 2002	Incumbent	—	—	G.W. Bush
120	Henry Autrey	E.D. Mo.	August 2, 2002	Incumbent	—	—	G.W. Bush
121	Morrison C. England Jr.	E.D. Cal.	August 2, 2002	December 17, 2019	October 4, 2024	retirement	G.W. Bush
122	William D. Quarles Jr.	D. Md.	March 14, 2003	February 1, 2016	—	resignation	G.W. Bush
123	Stephen C. Robinson	S.D.N.Y.	September 22, 2003	August 11, 2010	—	resignation	G.W. Bush
124	John A. Houston	S.D. Cal.	October 7, 2003	February 6, 2018	Incumbent	—	G.W. Bush
125	Marcia G. Cooke	S.D. Fla.	May 18, 2004	July 15, 2022	January 27, 2023	death	G.W. Bush
126	Sandra L. Townes	E.D.N.Y.	August 2, 2004	May 1, 2015	February 8, 2018	death	G.W. Bush
127	Susan D. Wigenton	D.N.J.	June 12, 2006	Incumbent	—	—	G.W. Bush
128	Vanessa Lynne Bryant	D. Conn.	April 2, 2007	February 1, 2021	Incumbent	—	G.W. Bush
129	Otis D. Wright II	C.D. Cal.	April 16, 2007	Incumbent	—	—	G.W. Bush
130	Richard A. Jones	W.D. Wash.	October 29, 2007	September 5, 2022	Incumbent	—	G.W. Bush
131	Brian Stacy Miller	E.D. Ark.	April 17, 2008	Incumbent	—	—	G.W. Bush
132	Mary Stenson Scriven	M.D. Fla.	September 30, 2008	Incumbent	—	—	G.W. Bush
133	C. Darnell Jones II	E.D. Pa.	October 30, 2008	March 15, 2021	Incumbent	—	G.W. Bush
134	Irene Berger	S.D. W. Va.	November 9, 2009	Incumbent	—	—	Obama
135	Charlene Edwards Honeywell	M.D. Fla.	November 12, 2009	December 4, 2023	Incumbent	—	Obama
136	Abdul Kallon	N.D. Ala.	January 4, 2010	August 31, 2022	—	resignation	Obama
137	Tanya Walton Pratt	S.D. Ind.	June 15, 2010	Incumbent	—	—	Obama
138	Brian Anthony Jackson	M.D. La.	June 15, 2010	Incumbent	—	—	Obama
139	Sharon Johnson Coleman	N.D. Ill.	July 13, 2010	Incumbent	—	—	Obama
140	J. Michelle Childs	D.S.C.	August 20, 2010	August 2, 2022	—	elevation to D.C. Circuit	Obama
141	Denise J. Casper	D. Mass.	December 20, 2010	Incumbent	—	—	Obama
142	Carlton W. Reeves	S.D. Miss.	December 20, 2010	Incumbent	—	—	Obama
143	Benita Y. Pearson	N.D. Ohio	December 27, 2010	Incumbent	—	—	Obama
144	Robert L. Wilkins	D.D.C.	December 27, 2010	January 24, 2014	—	elevation to D.C. Circuit	Obama
145	Steve C. Jones	N.D. Ga.	March 3, 2011	January 1, 2025	Incumbent	—	Obama
146	Arenda Wright Allen	E.D. Va.	May 12, 2011	May 13, 2026	Incumbent	—	Obama
147	Nannette Jolivette Brown	E.D. La.	October 4, 2011	Incumbent	—	—	Obama
148	William F. Kuntz II	E.D.N.Y.	October 4, 2011	January 1, 2022	Incumbent	—	Obama
149	Andrew L. Carter Jr.	S.D.N.Y.	October 8, 2011	Incumbent	—	—	Obama
150	Margo Kitsy Brodie	E.D.N.Y.	February 29, 2012	Incumbent	—	—	Obama
151	Brian C. Wimes	E.D. Mo.	April 30, 2012	Incumbent	—	—	Obama
151	Brian C. Wimes	W.D. Mo.	April 30, 2012	Incumbent	—	—	Obama
152	George L. Russell III	D. Md.	May 22, 2012	Incumbent	—	—	Obama
153	Michael A. Shipp	D.N.J.	July 26, 2012	Incumbent	—	—	Obama
154	John T. Fowlkes Jr.	W.D. Tenn.	August 1, 2012	September 1, 2022	Incumbent	—	Obama
155	Gershwin A. Drain	E.D. Mich.	August 8, 2012	August 13, 2022	Incumbent	—	Obama
156	Ketanji Brown Jackson	D.D.C.	March 26, 2013	June 17, 2021	—	elevation to D.C. Circuit	Obama
157	Raymond P. Moore	D. Colo.	March 26, 2013	June 20, 2023	Incumbent	—	Obama
158	Troy L. Nunley	E.D. Cal.	March 26, 2013	Incumbent	—	—	Obama
159	Analisa Torres	S.D.N.Y.	April 23, 2013	Incumbent	—	—	Obama
160	Vernon S. Broderick	S.D.N.Y.	September 10, 2013	Incumbent	—	—	Obama
161	Sara L. Ellis	N.D. Ill.	October 8, 2013	Incumbent	—	—	Obama
162	Andrea Wood	N.D. Ill.	October 15, 2013	Incumbent	—	—	Obama
163	Debra M. Brown	N.D. Miss.	November 5, 2013	Incumbent	—	—	Obama
164	Gregory Howard Woods	S.D.N.Y.	November 18, 2013	Incumbent	—	—	Obama
165	Brian J. Davis	M.D. Fla.	December 26, 2013	Incumbent	—	—	Obama
166	Linda Vivienne Parker	E.D. Mich.	March 17, 2014	Incumbent	—	—	Obama
167	Christopher R. Cooper	D.D.C.	March 28, 2014	Incumbent	—	—	Obama
168	George J. Hazel	D. Md.	May 2, 2014	February 24, 2023	—	resignation	Obama
169	Steven Logan	D. Ariz.	May 16, 2014	Incumbent	—	—	Obama
170	Tanya S. Chutkan	D.D.C.	June 5, 2014	Incumbent	—	—	Obama
171	Richard F. Boulware	D. Nev.	June 10, 2014	Incumbent	—	—	Obama
172	Staci Michelle Yandle	S.D. Ill.	June 19, 2014	Incumbent	—	—	Obama
173	Darrin P. Gayles	S.D. Fla.	June 19, 2014	Incumbent	—	—	Obama
174	Ronnie L. White	E.D. Mo.	July 17, 2014	July 31, 2024	—	retirement	Obama
175	André Birotte Jr.	C.D. Cal.	August 8, 2014	Incumbent	—	—	Obama
176	Leslie Abrams Gardner	M.D. Ga.	November 20, 2014	Incumbent	—	—	Obama
177	Eleanor L. Ross	N.D. Ga.	November 20, 2014	Incumbent	—	—	Obama
178	Wendy Beetlestone	E.D. Pa.	November 21, 2014	Incumbent	—	—	Obama
179	Victor Allen Bolden	D. Conn.	November 21, 2014	Incumbent	—	—	Obama
180	Haywood Gilliam	N.D. Cal.	December 19, 2014	Incumbent	—	—	Obama
181	Loretta Copeland Biggs	M.D.N.C.	December 19, 2014	December 31, 2024	Incumbent	—	Obama
182	Alfred H. Bennett	S.D. Tex.	April 15, 2015	Incumbent	—	—	Obama
183	George C. Hanks Jr.	S.D. Tex.	April 22, 2015	Incumbent	—	—	Obama
184	LaShann DeArcy Hall	E.D.N.Y.	November 17, 2015	Incumbent	—	—	Obama
185	Wilhelmina Wright	D. Minn.	February 18, 2016	February 15, 2024	Incumbent	—	Obama
186	Waverly D. Crenshaw Jr.	M.D. Tenn.	April 12, 2016	Incumbent	—	—	Obama
187	Terry F. Moorer	S.D. Ala.	September 4, 2018	Incumbent	—	—	Trump
188	Rossie D. Alston Jr.	E.D. Va.	June 12, 2019	Incumbent	—	—	Trump
189	Rodney Smith	S.D. Fla.	June 14, 2019	Incumbent	—	—	Trump
190	Jason K. Pulliam	W.D. Tex.	August 5, 2019	Incumbent	—	—	Trump
191	John Milton Younge	E.D. Pa.	August 20, 2019	Incumbent	—	—	Trump
192	Ada E. Brown	N.D. Tex.	September 13, 2019	Incumbent	—	—	Trump
193	Richard E. Myers II	E.D.N.C.	December 10, 2019	Incumbent	—	—	Trump
194	Stephanie D. Davis	E.D. Mich.	December 31, 2019	June 14, 2022	—	elevation to Sixth Circuit	Trump
195	Bernard M. Jones	W.D. Okla.	December 31, 2019	Incumbent	—	—	Trump
196	Franklin U. Valderrama	N.D. Ill.	September 23, 2020	Incumbent	—	—	Trump
197	Roderick C. Young	E.D. Va.	September 29, 2020	Incumbent	—	—	Trump
198	Joseph Dawson III	D.S.C.	December 22, 2020	Incumbent	—	—	Trump
199	Julien Neals	D.N.J.	June 22, 2021	Incumbent	–	–	Biden
200	Lydia Griggsby	D. Md.	July 20, 2021	Incumbent	–	–	Biden
201	Angel Kelley	D. Mass.	September 15, 2021	Incumbent	–	–	Biden
202	Karen M. Williams	D.N.J.	November 1, 2021	Incumbent	–	–	Biden
203	Patricia Tolliver Giles	E.D. Va.	November 1, 2021	Incumbent	–	–	Biden
204	Jia M. Cobb	D.D.C.	November 12, 2021	Incumbent	–	–	Biden
205	Omar A. Williams	D. Conn.	November 12, 2021	Incumbent	–	–	Biden
206	Maame Ewusi-Mensah Frimpong	C.D. Cal.	February 7, 2022	Incumbent	–	–	Biden
207	Charles E. Fleming	N.D. Ohio	February 8, 2022	Incumbent	–	–	Biden
208	Victoria Calvert	N.D. Ga.	April 5, 2022	Incumbent	–	–	Biden
209	Fred W. Slaughter	C.D. Cal.	April 19, 2022	Incumbent	–	–	Biden
210	Sherilyn Peace Garnett	C.D. Cal.	June 24, 2022	Incumbent	–	–	Biden
211	Trina Thompson	N.D. Cal.	August 5, 2022	Incumbent	–	–	Biden
212	Gregory B. Williams	D. Del.	September 1, 2022	Incumbent	–	–	Biden
213	Kelley B. Hodge	E.D. Pa.	December 23, 2022	Incumbent	–	–	Biden
214	Mia Roberts Perez	E.D. Pa.	December 16, 2022	Incumbent	–	–	Biden
215	Kai Scott	E.D. Pa.	January 18, 2023	Incumbent	–	–	Biden
216	Jerry W. Blackwell	D. Minn.	December 20, 2022	Incumbent	–	–	Biden
217	Jeffery P. Hopkins	S.D. Ohio	December 16, 2022	Incumbent	–	–	Biden
218	Lindsay C. Jenkins	N.D. Ill.	February 24, 2023	Incumbent	–	–	Biden
219	Adrienne Nelson	D. Ore.	February 23, 2023	Incumbent	–	–	Biden
220	Jamar K. Walker	E.D. Va.	March 3, 2023	Incumbent	–	–	Biden
221	Jamal Whitehead	W.D. Wash.	March 14, 2023	Incumbent	–	–	Biden
222	Jonathan J. C. Grey	E.D. Mich.	March 9, 2023	Incumbent	–	–	Biden
223	James E. Simmons Jr.	S.D. Cal.	March 10, 2023	Incumbent	—	—	Biden
224	Jessica G. L. Clarke	S.D.N.Y.	April 20, 2023	Incumbent	—	—	Biden
225	Orelia Merchant	E.D.N.Y.	May 12, 2023	Incumbent	—	—	Biden
226	LaShonda A. Hunt	N.D. Ill.	May 26, 2023	Incumbent	—	—	Biden
227	Jeremy C. Daniel	N.D. Ill.	June 6, 2023	Incumbent	—	—	Biden
228	Darrel J. Papillion	E.D. La.	June 1, 2023	Incumbent	—	—	Biden
229	Natasha C. Merle	E.D.N.Y.	August 11, 2023	Incumbent	—	—	Biden
230	Jeffrey Cummings	N.D. Ill.	October 10, 2023	Incumbent	—	—	Biden
231	Vernon D. Oliver	D. Conn.	October 18, 2023	Incumbent	—	—	Biden
232	Matthew J. Maddox	D. Md.	November 3, 2023	Incumbent	—	—	Biden
233	Brandy R. McMillion	E.D. Mich.	November 13, 2023	Incumbent	—	—	Biden
234	Micah W. J. Smith	D. Haw.	January 31, 2024	Incumbent	—	—	Biden
235	Jamel K. Semper	D.N.J.	December 1, 2023	Incumbent	—	—	Biden
236	Jerry Edwards Jr.	W.D. La.	December 22, 2023	Incumbent	—	—	Biden
237	Kato Crews	D. Colo.	January 12, 2024	Incumbent	—	—	Biden
238	Jacquelyn D. Austin	D.S.C.	January 29, 2024	Incumbent	—	—	Biden
239	Cristal C. Brisco	N.D. Ind.	January 26, 2024	Incumbent	—	—	Biden
240	Julie S. Sneed	M.D. Fla.	March 4, 2024	Incumbent	—	—	Biden
241	Melissa R. DuBose	D.R.I.	January 2, 2025	Incumbent	—	—	Biden
242	Dena M. Coggins	E.D. Cal.	September 18, 2024	Incumbent	—	—	Biden
243	Michelle Williams Court	C.D. Cal.	November 7, 2024	Incumbent	—	—	Biden
244	Tiffany R. Johnson	N.D. Ga.	January 2, 2025	Incumbent	—	—	Biden
245	Benjamin J. Cheeks	S.D. Cal.	January 9, 2025	Incumbent	—	—	Biden
246	Bill Lewis	M.D. Ala.	November 6, 2025	Incumbent	—	—	Trump
247	Sheria Clarke	D.S.C.	June 18, 2026	Incumbent	—	—	Trump

== Other federal courts ==
#	Judge	Court	Began active service	Ended active service	Ended senior status	Reason for termination	Appointed by
1	Irvin C. Mollison	Customs	October 29, 1945	May 5, 1962	—	death	Truman
2	Scovel Richardson	Customs	April 8, 1957	November 1, 1980	—	reassigned to International Trade	Eisenhower
2	Scovel Richardson	International Trade	November 1, 1980	March 30, 1982	—	death	Eisenhower
2	James Lopez Watson	Customs	March 7, 1966	November 1, 1980	—	reassigned to International Trade	Johnson
2	James Lopez Watson	International Trade	November 1, 1980	February 28, 1991	September 1, 2001	death	Johnson
3	Robert Morton Duncan	Military Appeals	November 29, 1971	July 11, 1974	—	elevation to S.D. Ohio	Nixon
4	Matthew J. Perry	Military Appeals	February 18, 1976	September 22, 1979	—	elevation to D.S.C.	Ford
5	Maurice B. Foley	Tax	April 9, 1995	Incumbent	—	—	Clinton
6	William P. Greene Jr.	Veterans Claims	November 7, 1997	November 2010	Incumbent	—	Clinton
7	Lynn J. Bush	Federal Claims	October 22, 1998	October 22, 2013	Incumbent	—	Clinton
8	Robert N. Davis	Veterans Claims	December 4, 2004	December 3, 2019	Incumbent	—	G.W. Bush
9	Patricia E. Campbell-Smith	Federal Claims	September 19, 2013	September 30, 2023	—	retirement	Obama
10	Tamara W. Ashford	Tax	December 19, 2014	Incumbent	—	—	Obama
11	Lydia Griggsby	Federal Claims	January 5, 2015	July 23, 2021	—	elevation to D. Md.	Obama
12	M. Tia Johnson	Armed Forces	January 3, 2023	Incumbent	—	—	Biden
13	Robin M. Meriweather	Federal Claims	August 8, 2024	Incumbent	—	—	Biden
14	Adam B. Landy	Tax	August 8, 2024	Incumbent	—	—	Biden

== See also ==
- List of African American jurists
