= Judge Bullock =

Judge Bullock may refer to:

- Frank William Bullock Jr. (born 1938), judge of the United States District Court for the Middle District of North Carolina
- J. Russell Bullock (1815–1899), judge of the United States District Court for the District of Rhode Island after having served as a justice of the Supreme Court of Rhode Island
