= Loretta Copeland Biggs =

American judge (born 1954)

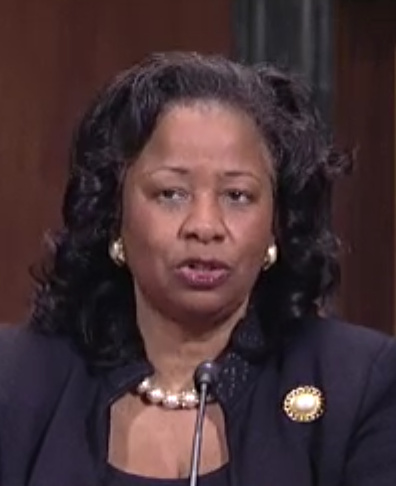

Senior Judge of the United States District Court for the Middle District of North Carolina
- Incumbent
- Assumed office December 31, 2024

Judge of the United States District Court for the Middle District of North Carolina
- In office December 19, 2014 – December 31, 2024
- Appointed by: Barack Obama
- Preceded by: James A. Beaty Jr.
- Succeeded by: David A. Bragdon

Judge of the North Carolina Court of Appeals
- In office February 1, 2001 – December 31, 2002
- Appointed by: Jim Hunt
- Preceded by: Seat established
- Succeeded by: Sanford L. Steelman Jr.

Judge of the 21st Judicial District Court of North Carolina
- In office 1987–1994
- Appointed by: James G. Martin

Personal details
- Born: Loretta Yvonne Copeland; March 6, 1954 (age 72) Atlanta, Georgia, U.S.
- Party: Democratic
- Education: Spelman College (BA); Howard University (JD)

Loretta Yvonne Copeland Biggs (née Copeland; born March 6, 1954) is a senior United States district judge of the United States District Court for the Middle District of North Carolina.

== Biography ==
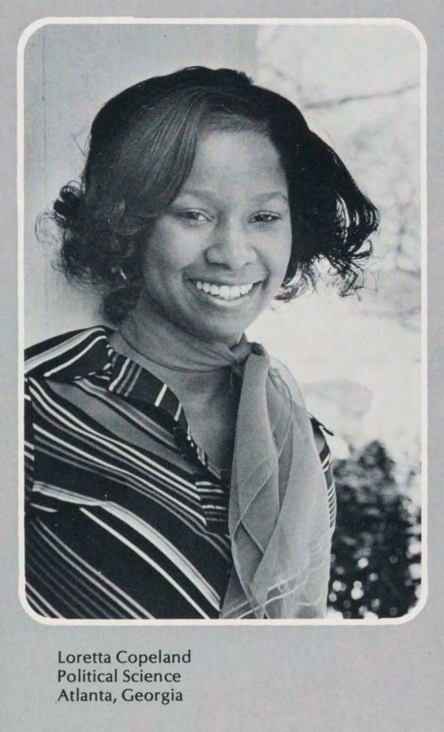
Biggs, then Copeland, in the Spelman College yearbook, 1976

Biggs was born on March 6, 1954, in Atlanta, Georgia. She graduated, cum laude, from Spelman College in 1976 with a Bachelor of Arts degree. In 1979 she received a Juris Doctor from Howard University School of Law. She worked as a staff attorney for The Coca-Cola Company from 1979 to 1982. She served as an assistant district attorney in Forsyth County from 1984 to 1987 and as a district court judge from 1987 to 1994. From 1984 to 1987 she was an adjunct professor of law at Wake Forest University School of Law. Biggs joined the United States Attorney's Office for the Middle District of North Carolina in 1994 and was the executive assistant United States attorney from 1997 to 2001. From 2001 to 2002, Biggs was a judge on the North Carolina Court of Appeals after being appointed by Governor Jim Hunt. She was narrowly defeated in her 2002 bid for a full term on the court by Sanford Steelman, Jr. Biggs then entered private practice with the firm of Davis, Harwell & Biggs, where she was managing partner. In 2014 she moved to the Winston-Salem firm of Allman, Spry, Davis, Leggett & Crumpler, P.A. where she worked until confirmation of her judicial appointment.

=== Federal judicial service ===
On September 18, 2014, President Barack Obama nominated Biggs to serve as a United States district judge for the United States District Court for the Middle District of North Carolina, to the seat being vacated by James A. Beaty Jr. who assumed senior status on June 30, 2014. She received a hearing before the United States Senate Committee on the Judiciary on November 13, 2014. On December 11, 2014, her nomination was reported out of committee by voice vote. On December 13, 2014 Senate Majority Leader Harry Reid filed a motion to invoke cloture on the nomination. On December 16, 2014, Reid withdrew his cloture motion on Copeland's nomination, and the Senate proceeded to vote to confirm Copeland in a voice vote. She received her federal judicial commission on December 19, 2014. She assumed senior status on December 31, 2024. Biggs is the first black woman to serve on a federal district court in North Carolina.

== See also ==
- List of African-American federal judges
- List of African-American jurists

Legal offices
Preceded by James A. Beaty Jr.	Judge of the United States District Court for the Middle District of North Carolina; 2014–2024	Succeeded by David A. Bragdon
