= Eleanor L. Ross =

American judge (born 1967)

Eleanor Louise Ross
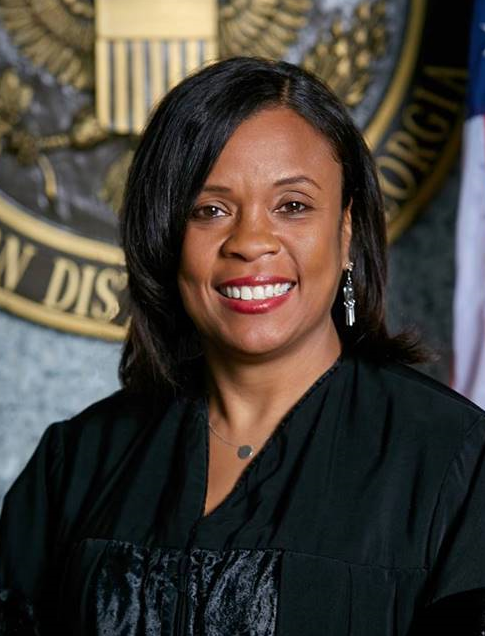

Judge of the United States District Court for the Northern District of Georgia
- Incumbent
- Assumed office November 20, 2014
- Appointed by: Barack Obama
- Preceded by: Charles A. Pannell Jr.

Personal details
- Born: Eleanor Louise Barnwell; December 8, 1967 (age 58) Washington, D.C., U.S.
- Spouse: Brian K. Ross (m. 2001)
- Children: 2
- Education: American University (BA); University of Houston (JD)

Eleanor Louise Ross (née Barnwell; born December 8, 1967) is a United States district judge of the United States District Court for the Northern District of Georgia and former judge of the DeKalb County State Court. She was reprimanded following a judicial misconduct investigation and is the subject of impeachment charges filed against her in the U.S. House of Representatives.

== Early life and career ==
Ross received her Bachelor of Arts degree in 1989, from American University. She received her Juris Doctor in 1994, from the University of Houston Law Center. She began her legal career as an assistant district attorney in Tarrant County, Texas, from 1995 to 1996. She served as an assistant solicitor general in the Office of the DeKalb County, Georgia, Solicitor General, from 1997 to 1998. From 1998 to 2002, she was a senior assistant district attorney in the Fulton County District Attorney's Office. From 2002 to 2005, she was an assistant United States attorney in the Northern District of Georgia. From 2007 to 2011, she served as executive assistant district attorney in the Fulton County District Attorney's Office. From 2011 to 2014, she served as a judge on the DeKalb County state court.

== Federal judicial service ==
On December 19, 2013, President Barack Obama nominated Ross to serve as a United States district judge of the United States District Court for the Northern District of Georgia, to the seat vacated by Judge Charles A. Pannell Jr., who assumed senior status on January 31, 2013. She received a hearing before the United States Senate Judiciary Committee on May 13, 2014. On June 19, 2014, her nomination was reported out of committee by a voice vote. On November 12, 2014, Senate Majority Leader Harry Reid filed for cloture on her nomination. On November 17, 2014, the United States Senate invoked cloture on her nomination by a 66–29 vote. On November 18, 2014, she was confirmed by a voice vote. She received her judicial commission on November 20, 2014, and was the first African-American woman to serve in the Northern District.

=== Notable rulings ===
In November 2018, Ross ruled against then Georgia Secretary of State (and Republican gubernatorial nominee) Brian Kemp whose office delayed 50,000 voting registration applications placed on hold due to Georgia's “exact-match” law, requiring that personal information on voter applications match what is on state databases. Her ruling allowed some 3,000 naturalized U.S. citizens to vote in elections and prevented the state from throwing out some absentee ballots.

In August 2020, Ross ordered Georgia to extend the deadline for receiving absentee ballots by three days. That decision was later stayed by a split panel of the Eleventh Circuit.

She presided over the tax evasion trial of Todd and Julie Chrisley, reality TV personalities from Chrisley Knows Best. In June 2022, they were found guilty. Ross sentenced Todd Chrisley to 12 years, and Julie Crisley to seven years, in prison; however, on June 21, 2024, a three-judge panel of the Eleventh Circuit upheld the convictions but ruled that Ross had miscalculated Julie’s sentencing guidelines, and remanded the case to Ross for resentencing. At a September 25, 2024 hearing, Ross imposed the same seven-year term. In May 2025, President Donald Trump pardoned the Chrisleys.

== Judicial misconduct ==
In May 2026, Ross was reprimanded following a judicial misconduct investigation by the United States Court of Appeals for the Eleventh Circuit and the Judicial Conference of the United States. The investigation found that she had engaged in an extramarital sexual relationship with Atlanta deputy police chief Kelley Collier in her chambers during business hours, at times within earshot of law clerks, and that the relationship posed a potential conflict-of-interest risk. The investigation also found that she attended a partisan political event and repeatedly lied, including to the investigating judicial panel, during the investigation of her conduct. The misconduct occurred between 2023 and 2025. Ross was issued a private reprimand, allowing her to remain in active service with limitations such as the inability to be a chief judge.

=== Recusal motion by DOJ ===
On May 29, 2026, the U.S. Department of Justice (DOJ) filed a motion for Ross to recuse herself from a pending case involving election records as the judge who was disciplined for attending a victory party for a Democratic district attorney’s campaign. The DOJ wrote, "A judge who attended a party celebrating the election of a Democrat best known for prosecuting a Republican President for alleged election interference cannot then preside over a case concerning that President’s efforts to ensure election integrity." Fani Willis, the subject district attorney, prosecuted the president for allegedly attempting to improperly overturn Georgia’s 2020 election results, but her case was dismissed after an appeals court found an “appearance of impropriety” created by a romantic relationship Willis had with the lawyer she had hired to conduct the prosecution. Ross granted the motion, recusing herself on June 16, 2026.

=== Impeachment charges ===
In June 2026, impeachment charges were filed against Ross in the U.S. House of Representatives. The charges were filed by U.S. Representatives Clay Fuller and Andrew Clyde, both Republicans, with Clyde's impeachment resolution having 14 co-sponsors. Besides Ross having extramarital sex in her courthouse chambers and attending a partisan Democratic political event, an aspect of the charges was her lying to two chief judges during the investigation of her conduct including her lying to 11th Circuit Court of Appeals Chief Judge William Pryor when she was questioned by him.

== Personal life ==
Since 2001, she has been married to Brian K. Ross, a DeKalb County state court judge and former Clayton County prosecutor. They have two daughters.

== See also ==
- List of African-American federal judges
- List of African-American jurists

Legal offices
Preceded by Charles A. Pannell Jr.	Judge of the United States District Court for the Northern District of Georgia; 2014–present	Incumbent
