= Wake Forest University School of Law =

Private law school in Winston-Salem, North Carolina, US

Coordinates: 36.1372°N 80.2748°W

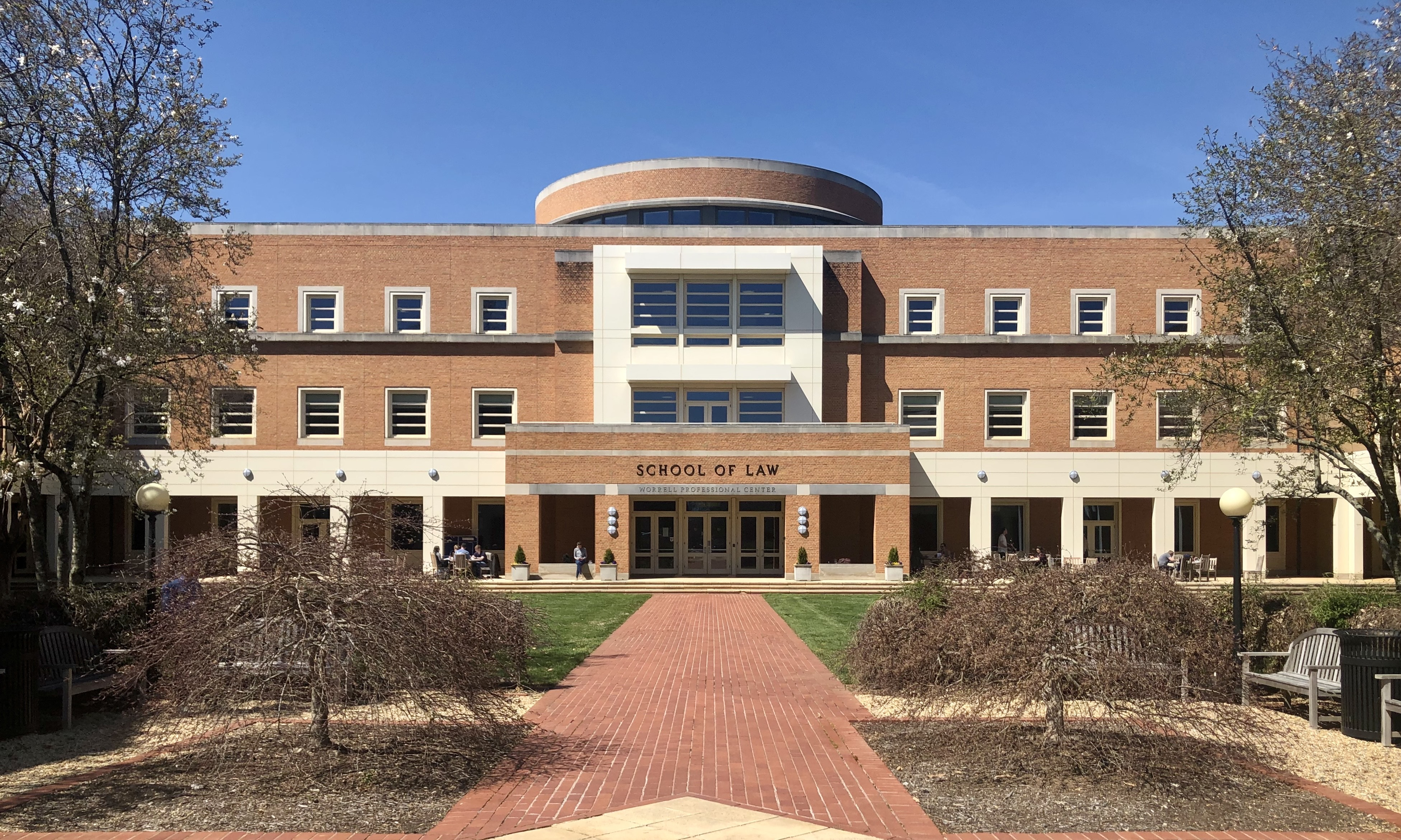
- Motto: Pro Humanitate (For Humanity)
- Parent school: Wake Forest University
- Established: 1894; 132 years ago
- School type: Private law school
- Parent endowment: $2.15 billion (FY2025)
- Dean: Andrew R. Klein
- Location: Winston-Salem, North Carolina, US
- Enrollment: 632
- Faculty: 45 (Full–time), 61 (Part–time)
- USNWR ranking: 30th (tie) (2026)
- Bar pass rate: 92.39% (2023 first-time takers)
- Website: law.wfu.edu

Wake Forest University School of Law is the law school of Wake Forest University, a private research university in Winston-Salem, North Carolina. Established in 1894, Wake Forest University School of Law is an American Bar Association (ABA) accredited law school and is a member of the Association of American Law Schools (AALS). The current dean is Andrew R. Klein.

The entering class in 2026 had 201 students, divided into four sections of approximately 50 students each. The entering class had a median LSAT score of 167 and median GPA of 3.79. As of 2025, Wake Forest University School of Law had 48 resident faculty members, 56 extended faculty members, and 7 law librarians.

According to Wake Forest's official ABA-required disclosures, 89.24% of the class of 2025 obtained full-time, long-term, Bar-required employment (i.e. as attorneys) within 10 months after graduation. Of those graduates, North Carolina was the most popular employment location accounting for over half of graduates’ employment. The bar passage rate in North Carolina for the Class of 2023 was 92.00% and the overall bar passage rate was 92.39%.

== Class profile ==
For 2026, Wake Forest University School of Law had 2883 applicants, offering admission to 710 (24.63%) and 201 enrolled (a 28.31% yield rate). The incoming class came from 110 different undergraduate colleges and universities from 38 different states, with 78% of students being classified as "out-of-state residents".

The incoming class included 16% identifying themselves as being LGBTQ+, 9% identifying as first-generation college students, and 86% identifying as first-generation law students. 60% of the incoming class also reported having at least 1 year of post-undergraduate experience prior to matriculating.

The incoming class had a median LSAT score of 167, the 75th percentile was 169, and the 25th percentile was 166. The median undergraduate GPA was 3.79, the 75th percentile was 3.90, and the 25th percentile was 3.59.

== Publications ==
The school has three student-run law journals. The school's flagship journal is the Wake Forest Law Review. The school also publishes two specialized journals, the Wake Forest Journal of Law & Policy and the Wake Forest Journal of Business and Intellectual Property Law.

Journal membership is determined primarily through a writing competition that is administered at the end of the first-year. Wake Forest Law Review also extends invitations for membership based on GPA to the top 10% of the first-year class, regardless of performance in the writing competition. The Wake Forest Journal of Business and Intellectual Property Law considers not only academic performance and achievement in the writing competition, but also takes prior experience in intellectual property law into account. By joining a journal, students are eligible to earn two (2) credit hours per year, in the Spring semester, by serving on the Editorial Board or by writing an original piece of scholarship (i.e. a Note or Comment).

== Rankings ==
The Wake Forest University School of Law is ranked tied for 30th in the 2025 U.S. News & World Report ranking.

== Student organizations ==
- Student Bar Association
- Phi Alpha Delta
- Asian Pacific American Law Association
- Black Law Students Association
- North Carolina Student Bar Association
- American Constitution Society
- Federalist Society
- Christian Legal Society
- Moot Court Board
- Trial Bar
- Transactional Law Competition
- Public Interest Law Organization
- Wake Forest Law Review
- Wake Forest Journal of Law & Policy
- Wake Forest Journal of Business and Intellectual Property Law
- Texas Young Lawyer Association National Trial Team
- AAJ Student Trial Advocacy Competition Trial Team
- OUTLaw

== Student opportunities ==
- Metropolitan Externship in Washington, D.C. – Students spend approximately 35 hours per week interning in a government agency or non-governmental organization. In addition to this practice component, students attend a weekly class session, which explores issues common to the interns.
- Summer Study Abroad Programs in London, Venice, and Vienna.
- Inns of Court
- Guardian Ad Litem
- Pro bono Project

== Clinics ==
The law school offers seven legal clinics, or programs that allow students to attain practical legal experience through providing legal services to real clients.

- Appellate Advocacy Clinic – Students represent clients in a variety of appellate courts, including the Fourth Circuit and the Seventh Circuit. Students handle an actual appeal from start to finish, with advice and assistance from their professor, who is counsel of record. Students also travel to Washington, D.C., to observe arguments at the United States Supreme Court.
- Child Advocacy Clinic – represent children in custody disputes, domestic violence situations, and in issues involving the public school system.
- Community Law and Business Clinic – A new program, this clinic provides law and graduate business students with an opportunity to develop skills needed to practice in the increasingly complex legal and regulatory environment they will encounter as professionals.
- Innocence and Justice Clinic – This clinic has its origins in the Innocence Project in which Wake Forest students review and investigate claims of innocence to determine whether DNA evidence existed that could exonerate inmates.
- Civil & Criminal Externship Clinic – Formerly referred to as the Litigation Clinic, students have the opportunity to receive real world practice experience by working with local attorneys. During the semester, all students receive civil placements with local firms, in-house counsel offices, and the Office of the United States Attorney for the Middle District of North Carolina. Students also spend half of their semester working in a criminal placement. These placements have included private firms as well as prosecutors' and public defenders' offices.
- Veterans Legal Clinic – Students work with former military services members to upgrade their discharge statuses. The lengthy process involves submitting briefs to the pertinent military discharge review board.

== Employment ==
According to Wake Forest's official ABA-required disclosures, within 10 months after graduation 73.3% of the Class of 2016 obtained full-time, long-term, Bar-required employment (i.e. as attorneys) and 13.0% obtained JD Advantage employment.

ABA Employment Summary for 2016 Graduates
Employment Status	Percentage
Employed - Bar Passage Required (Full-Time, Long-Term)	73.3%
Employed - Bar Passage Required (Part-Time and/or Short-Term)	0.5%
Employed - J.D. Advantage	13.0%
Employed - Professional Position	3.8%
Employed - Non-Professional Position	0.0%
Employed - Undeterminable	0.0%
Pursuing Graduate Degree Full Time	2.1%
Unemployed - Start Date Deferred	4.3%
Unemployed - Not Seeking	0.0%
Unemployed - Seeking	2.7%
Employment Status Unknown	0.0%
Total of 184 Graduates

== Cost of attendance ==
The total cost of attendance (indicating the cost of tuition, fees, and living expenses) at Wake Forest University School of Law for the 2022–2023 academic year is $78,744. Though Wake Forest University School of Law does not provide any "need-based" scholarships (i.e. scholarship based on income or family contribution), most students qualify for and receive some form of "merit based" scholarship (i.e. scholarship based on prior academic performance).

Total Estimated Cost of Attendance
Tuition	$51,000
Technology Fee	$400
Student Health Fee	$528
Activity Fee	$100
Average Loan Fee	$1,142
Books and Supplies	$1,530
Housing and Utilities	$11,700
Food	$3,690
Personal Expenses	$2,700
Health Insurance	$2,834
Transportation	$3,120

For all students in attendance between 2020-2021, out of 465 students, 443 students received some form of merit scholarship (95% of total students). Of those students, 122 (26% of total students) received scholarships for an amount less than half the cost of tuition. Another 288 (62% of total students) received scholarships for amounts between half and full tuition. And 31 (7% of total students) received scholarships for amounts greater than the cost of tuition. Of the scholarships provided: the 75th percentile was valued at $42,000 per year, the median was valued at $36,000 per year, and the 25 percentile was valued at $22,250 per year.

Outside of traditional scholarship opportunities, Wake Forest students frequently receive Grad PLUS Loans through Federal Student Aid Programs or participate in various approved Federal Work-Study program opportunities throughout the law school.

== Notable alumni ==
- Kenneth D. Bell (J.D. 1983), Judge of the United States District Court for the Western District of North Carolina
- Phil Berger Jr. (J.D.), associate judge of the North Carolina Supreme Court
- Joseph Branch, Former chief justice of the North Carolina Supreme Court
- Fanny Yarborough Bickett (J.D.), First lady of North Carolina and first female president of the North Carolina Railroad
- Rhoda Billings (J.D., 1966), Former justice of the North Carolina Supreme Court
- Porter Byrum (J.D., 1942), Attorney and philanthropist
- Mary P. Easley (J.D. 1975), Former first lady of North Carolina
- William Earl Britt (LL.B. 1958), Former federal judge for the United States District Court for the Eastern District of North Carolina
- James P. Cain (J.D. 1984), Former U.S. ambassador to Denmark
- Sidney S. Eagles Jr. (J.D. 1964), Former justice of the North Carolina Court of Appeals
- Andi Dorfman (J.D. 2012), television personality, The Bachelorette
- Creigh Deeds (J.D., 1984) Member of the Virginia State Senate
- Elizabeth Kay Dillon (J.D. 1986), Federal judge for the United States District Court for the Western District of Virginia
- Robert L. Ehrlich (J.D., 1982), Former governor of and congressman for the state of Maryland
- Rocky Fitzsimmons, Member of the West Virginia Senate
- Jerome B. Friedman (J.D., 1969), Federal judge for the United States District Court for the Eastern District of Virginia
- Kay Hagan (JD, 1978), Former U.S. Senator for the state of North Carolina (2009-2015)
- Johnson Jay Hayes (LL.B. 1909), Judge of the United States District Court for the Middle District of North Carolina
- Bo Hines (J.D. 2022), Executive Director of the Council of Advisers on Digital Assets in the second Trump administration
- Malcolm Jones Howard, (J.D. 1970), Federal judge for the United States District Court for the Eastern District of North Carolina
- John Howard (J.D. 1976), 8th bishop of the Episcopal Diocese of Florida
- Woodrow Wilson Jones (LL.B. 1937), Federal judge for the Western District of North Carolina
- Brad Knott (J.D.), U.S. representative for North Carolina
- Cheslie Kryst (J.D. 2017), Miss USA 2019 and television presenter
- I. Beverly Lake Jr. (J.D. 1960), Former chief justice of the North Carolina Supreme Court
- John C. Martin (J.D. 1967), Former chief judge of the North Carolina Court of Appeals
- Warren McGraw (J.D. 1963), Former chief justice of the Supreme Court of Appeals of West Virginia and West Virginia Senate president
- Robert Burren Morgan (J.D.), Former U.S. senator for the state of North Carolina (1975–1981)
- Anuraag Singhal (J.D. 1989), Judge of the United States District Court for the Southern District of Florida
- Emory M. Sneeden (LL.B. 1953), Former judge of the United States Court of Appeals for the Fourth Circuit
- Edwin Monroe Stanley (LL.B., 1931), Former federal judge for the United States District Court for the Middle District of North Carolina
- Chris Swecker (J.D. 1981), attorney and assistant director of the FBI for the CID
- Charles H. Taylor (J.D., 1966) Former U.S. representative for the state of North Carolina (1991–2007)
- Norwood Tilley (J.D. 1969), Federal judge for the United States District Court for the Middle District of North Carolina
- Don Vaughan (J.D., 1979) Former member of the North Carolina State Senate from Greensboro
- Hiram Hamilton Ward (LL.B., 1950) Former federal judge for the United States District Court for the Middle District of North Carolina
- Samuel Grayson Wilson (J.D. 1974) Federal judge for the United States District Court for the Western District of Virginia
- Christopher R. Barron (J.D.), Co-founder of GOProud.
- Greg Habeeb (J.D., 2001) Member of the Virginia House of Delegates
- Suzanne Reynolds (J.D., 1977) Dean emerita and professor of law at Wake Forest School of Law
