= Wake Forest Journal of Business and Intellectual Property Law =

Wake Forest Intellectual Property Law Journal
- Discipline: Business law and intellectual property law
- Language: English

Publication details
- History: 2001–present
- Publisher: Wake Forest University School of Law

Standard abbreviations
- Bluebook: Wake Forest Intell. Prop. L.J.
- ISO 4: Wake For. Intellect. Prop. Law J.

Indexing
- ISSN: 1936-8666

The Wake Forest Journal of Business and Intellectual Property Law is a student-run law journal produced by the Wake Forest University School of Law.

The journal was founded in 2001 after years of lobbying and preparation by students, professors, and alumni active in the field of intellectual property law. The journal is one of three publications produced by the Wake Forest University School of Law. The journal is independent from the Intellectual Property Law Association of Wake Forest University School of Law, but coordinates with that student group to plan events and host speakers on campus. In 2006, the journal was ranked 6th nationally out of all intellectual property law journals in the "2006 ExpressO Law Review Submissions Guide."

== History ==
The journal was founded as the Wake Forest Intellectual Property Law Journal in 2001 as a print-only journal and published ten volumes under that name. The journal began digital publication in 2006. In August 2010, the journal changed its title beginning with the tenth volume and is now known as the Wake Forest Journal of Business and Intellectual Property Law.

== Selection ==
Membership on the journal is competitive among students at Wake Forest. Slightly less than half of each incoming staff is chosen based solely on grade point average. The remaining staff members are chosen during a summer "write-on" competition, organized in conjunction with the Wake Forest Law Review and the Wake Forest Journal of Law & Policy. Students draft a "note" from a closed-research problem book, generally pertaining to a pending case before the Supreme Court or a Circuit Court of Appeal. The Note submissions are graded by the editors of each publication. The journal also has a procedure whereby students with extensive work experience in intellectual property, and a demonstrated commitment to future employment in the field of intellectual property law, can apply to join the Journal as a staff member.

The journal has a staff of approximately 40 students, with 14 of those serving in an editorial capacity. Professor Simone Rose serves as the faculty advisor.

== Board of Advisors ==
Decisions to publish a given piece of scholarship in the Journal are made by the editorial staff in conjunction with the Board of Advisors. The board consists of professors of intellectual property law and attorneys practicing within the field. In addition to reviewing articles and providing substantive editorial suggestions to authors, members of the board assist in providing guidance and advice to the journal's editors.

- Danny M. Awdehh, Finnegan Henderson Farabow Garrett & Dunner LLP
- Charles W. Calkins, Kilpatrick Stockton LLP
- Kenneth P. Carlson, Constangy, Brooks & Smith, LLP
- Trip Coyne, Ward and Smith, P.A.
- Rodrick J. Enns, Enns & Archer LLP
- Edward R. Ergenzinger, Jr., Ph.D., Lexaria Bioscience Corp.
- Jason D. Gardner, Kilpatrick Townsend & Stockton LLP
- Steven Gardner, Kilpatrick Townsend & Stockton LLP
- Rob Hunter, The Clearing House Payments Company L.L.C.
- Dirk D. Lasater, King & Spalding
- James L. Lester, MacCord Mason PLLC
- Chad Marzen, American General Insurance Associate Professor of Insurance Law
- Professor Michael S. Mireles, University of the Pacific, McGeorge School of Law
- Justin R. Nifong, NK Patent Law
- Professor Alan Palmiter, Wake Forest University School of Law
- Professor Abigail L. Perdue, Wake Forest University School of Law
- Coe W. Ramsey, Brooks Pierce
- T. Robert Rehm, Jr., Smith, Anderson, Blount, Dorsett, Mitchell & Jernigan, L.L.P.
- Professor Simone Rose (Faculty Advisor), Wake Forest University School of Law

== See also ==
- List of intellectual property law journals
