= 1926 United States Senate election in North Carolina =

- November 2, 1926
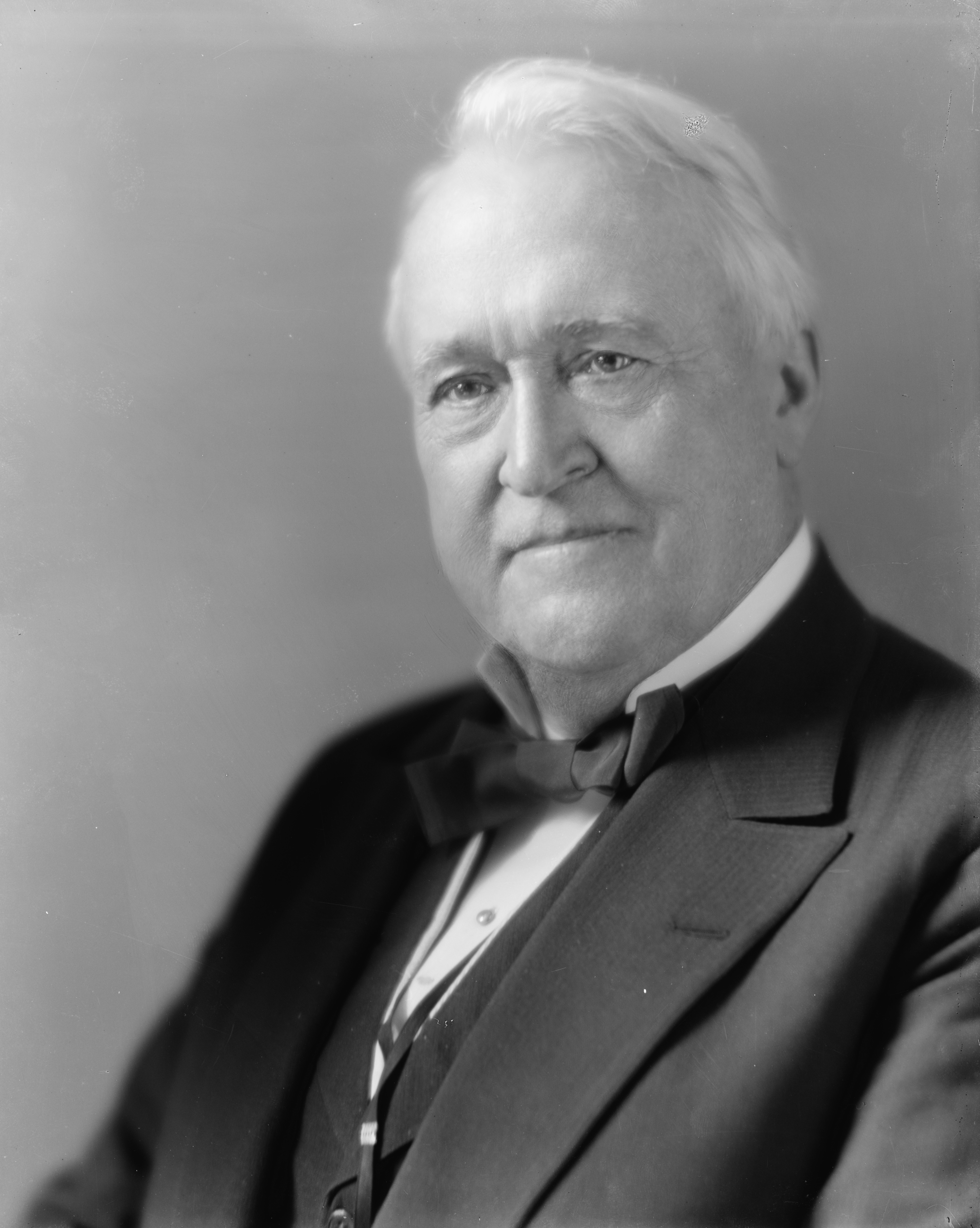

Nominee	Lee Overman	Johnson Jay Hayes
Party	Democratic	Republican
Popular vote	218,934	142,891
Percentage	60.51%	39.49%
Senator before election
Lee Slater Overman
Democratic
Elected Senator
Lee Slater Overman
Democratic

The 1926 United States Senate election in North Carolina was held on November 2, 1926. Incumbent Democratic Senator Lee Slater Overman was re-elected to a fifth term in office, defeating Republican Johnson Jay Hayes.

== Democratic primary ==
=== Candidates ===
- Lee Slater Overman, incumbent Senator since 1903
- Robert Rice Reynolds, Asheville attorney

=== Results ===
1926 Democratic Senate primary
Party	Candidate	Votes	%
Democratic	Lee Slater Overman (incumbent)	140,260	60.41%
Democratic	Robert Rice Reynolds	91,914	39.59%
Total votes		232,174	100.00%

== General election ==
=== Results ===
1926 U.S. Senate election in North Carolina
Party	Candidate	Votes	%	±%
Democratic	Lee Slater Overman (incumbent)	218,934	60.51%	▲2.99
Republican	Jacob F. Newell	142,891	39.49%	▼2.99
Total votes		361,825	100.00%	
