= William Lindsay Osteen Jr. =

American judge (born 1960)

Chief Judge of the United States District Court for the Middle District of North Carolina
- In office November 1, 2012 – November 3, 2017
- Preceded by: James A. Beaty Jr.
- Succeeded by: Thomas D. Schroeder

Judge of the United States District Court for the Middle District of North Carolina
- Incumbent
- Assumed office September 19, 2007
- Appointed by: George W. Bush
- Preceded by: William Lindsay Osteen Sr.

Personal details
- Born: August 8, 1960 (age 65) Greensboro, North Carolina, U.S.
- Education: University of North Carolina at Chapel Hill (BS, JD)

William Lindsay Osteen Jr. (born August 8, 1960) is a United States district judge of the United States District Court for the Middle District of North Carolina.

== Education and career ==
Osteen was born in Greensboro, North Carolina. He received a Bachelor of Science degree from University of North Carolina at Chapel Hill in 1983. He received a Juris Doctor from University of North Carolina School of Law in 1987. He was in private practice of law in Greensboro from 1987 to 2007.

=== Federal judicial service ===
Osteen was nominated by President George W. Bush on January 9, 2007 to serve as a United States district judge of the United States District Court for the Middle District of North Carolina. He was nominated to the seat vacated by his father, Judge William Lindsay Osteen Sr. He was confirmed by the United States Senate on September 10, 2007, and received his commission on September 19, 2007. He served as chief judge from November 1, 2012 to November 3, 2017.

=== Notable ruling ===
He struck down North Carolina's 'life of the mother only' 20-week abortion ban in March 2019. His judgement pushed the date of which abortions could be performed to the date of viability, which is later for many women. However, Osteen reinstated the NC 20-week abortion ban, with exceptions for urgent medical emergencies, after the June 2022 U.S. Supreme Court decision overturning Roe v. Wade erased the legal foundation for his 2019 ruling that had struck down the 1973 state law. Judge Osteen stated “Neither this court, nor the public, nor counsel, nor providers have the right to ignore the rule of law as determined by the Supreme Court."

== Sources ==
Legal offices
Preceded by William Lindsay Osteen Sr.	Judge of the United States District Court for the Middle District of North Carolina; 2007–present	Incumbent
Preceded by James A. Beaty Jr.	Chief Judge of the United States District Court for the Middle District of North Carolina; 2012–2017	Succeeded by Thomas D. Schroeder
