= Wake Forest Law Review =

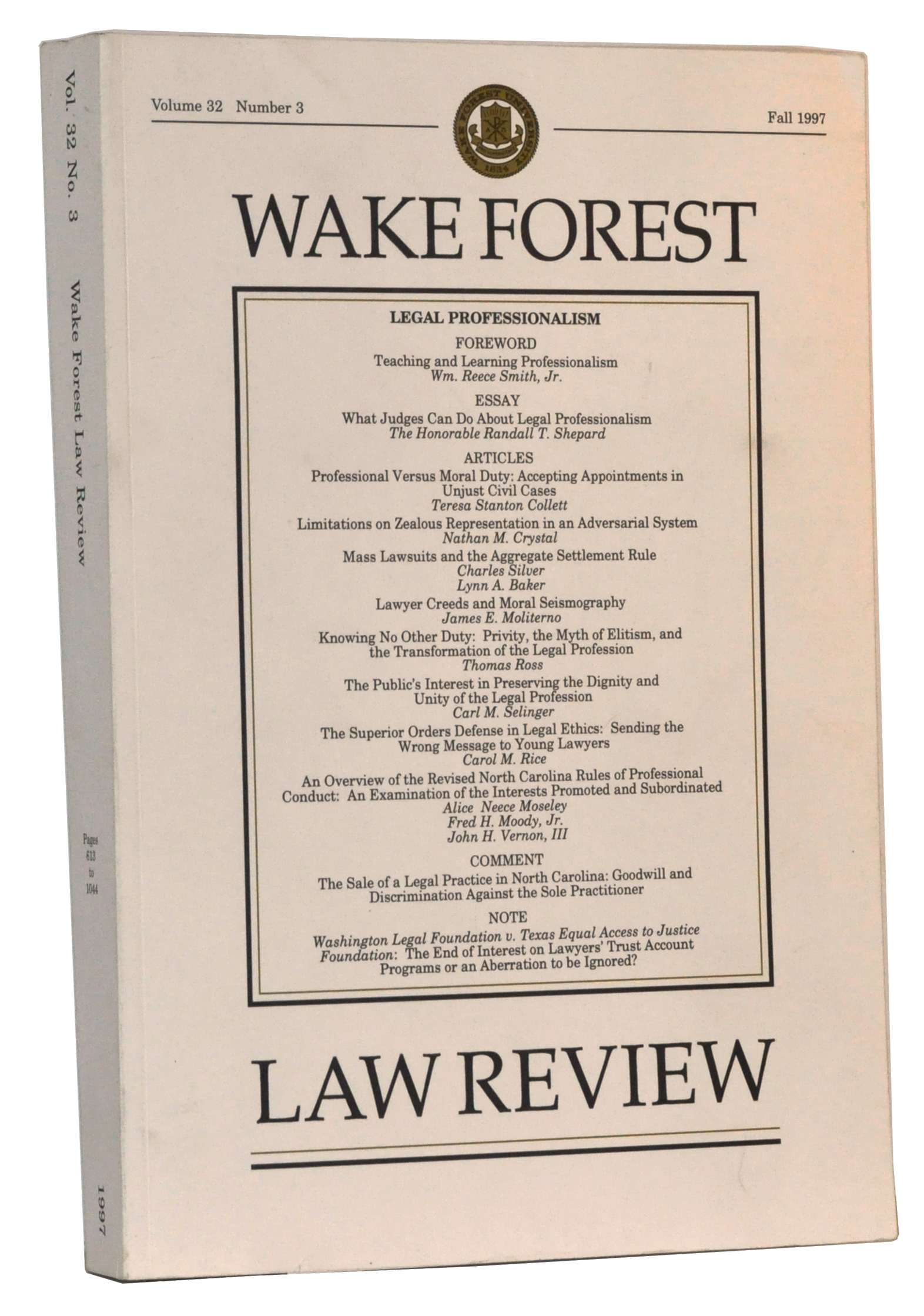
- Volume of Wake Forest Law Review
- Discipline: Legal studies
- Language: English
- Edited by: Kenya R. Parrish

Publication details
- Former name(s): Intramural Law Review of Wake Forest College
- History: 1965–present
- Publisher: Wake Forest University School of Law (United States)
- Frequency: 5/year

Standard abbreviations
- Bluebook: Wake Forest L. Rev.
- ISO 4: Wake For. Law Rev.

Indexing
- ISSN: 0043-003X
- OCLC no.: 50636177

Links
- Journal homepage; Common Law; Online archive

The Wake Forest Law Review is a law journal edited and published by students at the Wake Forest University School of Law.

== Rankings ==
In 2013, the Wake Forest Law Review was ranked 40th overall among American law reviews by the Washington and Lee Law Review rankings, 2005–2012. In 2006, ExpressO ranked the Law Review 13th among the 100 Most Popular General Student Law Reviews, based upon submissions.

== Membership selection ==
The Wake Forest Law Review extends invitations to approximately twenty percent of each rising 2L class and to any rising 3L student who enters the top ten percent of the class after the second year. Law Review members are selected in two ways. First, students ranked in the top ten percent (rounded off) of their class after completion of the first or second year of law school may "grade on" to Law Review. Second, a number of students equal to the rising 2Ls who grade on are invited to join the Law Review based upon their performance in a writing competition and their first-year grades. JD/MBA students may only participate in the writing competition at the end of their first year of law school.
