= Purlear, North Carolina =

- Unincorporated community
- Location within North Carolina Location within the United States
- Coordinates: 36°10′55″N 81°17′03″W
- Country: United States
- State: North Carolina
- County: Wilkes
- Elevation: 1,342 ft (409 m)
- Time zone: UTC-5 (Eastern (EST))
  - Summer (DST): UTC-4 (EDT)
- ZIP code: 28665
- Area code: 336
- GNIS feature ID: 992920

Purlear is an unincorporated community in Wilkes County, North Carolina, United States. Purlear is 2.65 miles (4.26 km) west of Millers Creek. Purlear has a post office with ZIP code 28665. Rendezvous Mountain State Park is located in Purlear.

== Notable persons ==
- Johnson Jay Hayes, U.S. federal judge
- Travis A. LeFever, CEO at Mission Mobile Medical Group
- Benny Parsons, NASCAR Champion and Emmy Winning Broadcaster
