= Edwin Monroe Stanley =

American judge

Chief Judge of the United States District Court for the Middle District of North Carolina
- In office 1961–1971
- Preceded by: Office established
- Succeeded by: Eugene Andrew Gordon

Judge of the United States District Court for the Middle District of North Carolina
- In office October 23, 1957 – December 23, 1971
- Appointed by: Dwight D. Eisenhower
- Preceded by: Johnson Jay Hayes
- Succeeded by: Hiram Hamilton Ward

United States Attorney for the Middle District of North Carolina
- In office 1954–1957
- President: Dwight D. Eisenhower
- Preceded by: Bryce R. Holt
- Succeeded by: Robert L. Gavin

Personal details
- Born: Edwin Monroe Stanley; March 9, 1909 Forsyth County, North Carolina, U.S.
- Died: December 23, 1971 (aged 62)
- Education: Wake Forest University School of Law (LL.B.)

Edwin Monroe Stanley (March 9, 1909 – December 23, 1971) was a United States district judge of the United States District Court for the Middle District of North Carolina.

== Education and career ==
Born in Forsyth County, North Carolina, Stanley received a Bachelor of Laws from Wake Forest University School of Law in 1931. He was in private practice of law in Greensboro, North Carolina from 1931 to 1954. He was a Judge of the Greensboro Juvenile Court from 1951 to 1954. He was the United States Attorney for the Middle District of North Carolina from 1954 to 1957.

== Federal judicial service ==
Stanley received a recess appointment from President Dwight D. Eisenhower on October 23, 1957, to a seat on the United States District Court for the Middle District of North Carolina vacated by Judge Johnson Jay Hayes. Nominated to the same seat by President Eisenhower on January 13, 1958, Stanley was confirmed by the United States Senate on February 25, 1958, and received his commission on February 27, 1958. He served as Chief Judge from 1961 until his death on December 23, 1971.

== Sources ==
Legal offices
Preceded by Johnson Jay Hayes	Judge of the United States District Court for the Middle District of North Carolina; 1957–1971	Succeeded by Hiram Hamilton Ward
Preceded by Office established	Chief Judge of the United States District Court for the Middle District of North Carolina; 1961–1971	Succeeded by Eugene Andrew Gordon
