= William Lindsay Osteen Sr. =

American judge (1930–2009)

Senior Judge of the United States District Court for the Middle District of North Carolina
- In office April 3, 2006 – September 14, 2007

Judge of the United States District Court for the Middle District of North Carolina
- In office June 18, 1991 – April 3, 2006
- Appointed by: George H. W. Bush
- Preceded by: Seat established by 104 Stat. 5089
- Succeeded by: William Lindsay Osteen Jr.

Personal details
- Born: William Lindsay Osteen; July 15, 1930 Greensboro, North Carolina, U.S.
- Died: August 9, 2009 (aged 79)
- Education: Guilford College (AB); University of North Carolina School of Law (LLB)

William Lindsay Osteen (July 15, 1930 – August 9, 2009) was a United States district judge of the United States District Court for the Middle District of North Carolina.

== Education and career ==
Osteen was born in Greensboro, North Carolina and graduated from Guilford High School. After high school, he joined the United States Army Reserve in 1948 and served for two years leaving in 1951. He received an Artium Baccalaureus degree from Guilford College in 1953. He received a Bachelor of Laws from the University of North Carolina School of Law in 1956.

He was in private practice of law in North Wilkesboro, North Carolina from 1956 to 1958 and in Greensboro, North Carolina from 1958 to 1969. He was the United States Attorney for the Middle District of North Carolina from 1969 to 1974. He was in private practice of law in Greensboro from 1974 to 1991.

== Federal judicial service ==
Osteen was nominated by President George H. W. Bush on April 25, 1991, to the United States District Court for the Middle District of North Carolina, to a new seat created by 104 Stat. 5089. He was confirmed by the United States Senate on June 14, 1991, and received his commission on June 18, 1991. Osteen assumed senior status on April 3, 2006, and retired on September 14, 2007. He was succeeded by his son, William Lindsay Osteen Jr.

He is buried at Forest Lawn Cemetery, Greensboro North Carolina.

== Sources ==
- FJC Bio

Legal offices
Preceded by Seat established by 104 Stat. 5089	Judge of the United States District Court for the Middle District of North Carolina; 1980–1992	Succeeded by William Lindsay Osteen Jr.
