= Richard Erwin =

American judge

Senior Judge of the United States District Court for the Middle District of North Carolina
- In office September 22, 1992 – November 7, 2006

Chief Judge of the United States District Court for the Middle District of North Carolina
- In office 1988–1992
- Preceded by: Hiram Hamilton Ward
- Succeeded by: Frank William Bullock Jr.

Judge of the United States District Court for the Middle District of North Carolina
- In office September 30, 1980 – September 22, 1992
- Appointed by: Jimmy Carter
- Preceded by: Seat established by 92 Stat. 1629
- Succeeded by: James A. Beaty Jr.

Personal details
- Born: Richard Cannon Erwin; August 23, 1923 Marion, North Carolina, U.S.
- Died: November 7, 2006 (aged 83) Winston-Salem, North Carolina, U.S.
- Education: Johnson C. Smith University (BA); Howard University School of Law (LLB)

Richard Cannon Erwin (August 23, 1923 – November 7, 2006) was a United States district judge of the United States District Court for the Middle District of North Carolina and politician who was the first African American, except for Abraham Galloway, to be elected to statewide office in North Carolina.

== Education and career ==
Born in Marion, North Carolina, Erwin served in the United States Army during World War II, from 1943 to 1946, achieving the rank of Sergeant. He received a Bachelor of Arts degree from Johnson C. Smith University in 1947, and a Bachelor of Laws from Howard University School of Law in 1951. While at Johnson C. Smith University, Erwin was a member of the Alpha Epsilon chapter of Kappa Alpha Psi fraternity. He was in private practice in Winston-Salem, North Carolina from 1951 to 1977. Erwin served on his local school board in Winston-Salem from 1961 to 1968, on the North Carolina State Board of Education from 1971 to 1977, and was elected to two terms in the North Carolina Senate as a Democrat. In 1977, Governor Jim Hunt appointed him to the North Carolina Court of Appeals. In 1978, the voters of the state elected him to continue as an Appeals Court judge, thus making him the first African American statewide official actually elected by its voters.

== Federal judicial service ==
On June 11, 1980, Erwin was nominated by President Jimmy Carter to a new seat on the United States District Court for the Middle District of North Carolina created by 92 Stat. 1629. He was confirmed by the United States Senate on September 29, 1980, and received his commission on September 30, 1980, thereby becoming the first black federal judge in North Carolina. Erwin served as Chief Judge from 1988 until he assumed senior status on September 22, 1992. He served in that capacity until his death on November 7, 2006, in Winston-Salem.

== See also ==
- List of African-American federal judges
- List of African-American jurists
- List of first minority male lawyers and judges in North Carolina

== Sources ==
- NC Bar Association: Judge Richard Erwin, Former NCBA VP, Dies

Legal offices
Preceded by Seat established by 92 Stat. 1629	Judge of the United States District Court for the Middle District of North Carolina; 1980–1992	Succeeded by James A. Beaty Jr.
Preceded by Hiram Hamilton Ward	Chief Judge of the United States District Court for the Middle District of North Carolina; 1988–1992	Succeeded by Frank William Bullock Jr.
