= Thomas D. Schroeder =

American judge (born 1959)

Chief Judge of the United States District Court for the Middle District of North Carolina
- In office November 4, 2017 – August 13, 2023
- Preceded by: William Lindsay Osteen Jr.
- Succeeded by: Catherine Eagles

Judge of the United States District Court for the Middle District of North Carolina
- Incumbent
- Assumed office January 8, 2008
- Appointed by: George W. Bush
- Preceded by: Frank William Bullock Jr.

Personal details
- Born: May 26, 1959 (age 66) Atlanta, Georgia, U.S.
- Education: University of Kansas (BS); Notre Dame University (JD)

Thomas David Schroeder (born May 26, 1959) is the United States district judge of the United States District Court for the Middle District of North Carolina.

== Education and career ==
Schroeder was born in Atlanta. He received a Bachelor of Science degree from the University of Kansas in 1981 and a Juris Doctor from Notre Dame Law School in 1984. He was a law clerk to George MacKinnon of the United States Court of Appeals for the District of Columbia Circuit from 1984 to 1985. He was in private practice, in Winston-Salem, North Carolina, with the law firm of Womble Carlyle Sandridge and Rice, from 1985 to 2007.

=== Federal judicial service ===
On January 9, 2007, Schroeder was nominated by President George W. Bush to a seat on the United States District Court for the Middle District of North Carolina vacated by Judge Frank William Bullock Jr. Schroeder was confirmed by the United States Senate on December 14, 2007, and received his commission on January 8, 2008. He served as the chief judge from November 4, 2017 to August 13, 2023.

== Sources ==
Legal offices
Preceded by Frank William Bullock Jr.	Judge of the United States District Court for the Middle District of North Carolina; 2008–present	Incumbent
Preceded by William Lindsay Osteen Jr.	Chief Judge of the United States District Court for the Middle District of North Carolina; 2017–2023	Succeeded by Catherine Eagles
