= David A. Bragdon =

American lawyer (born 1977)

David Alan Bragdon
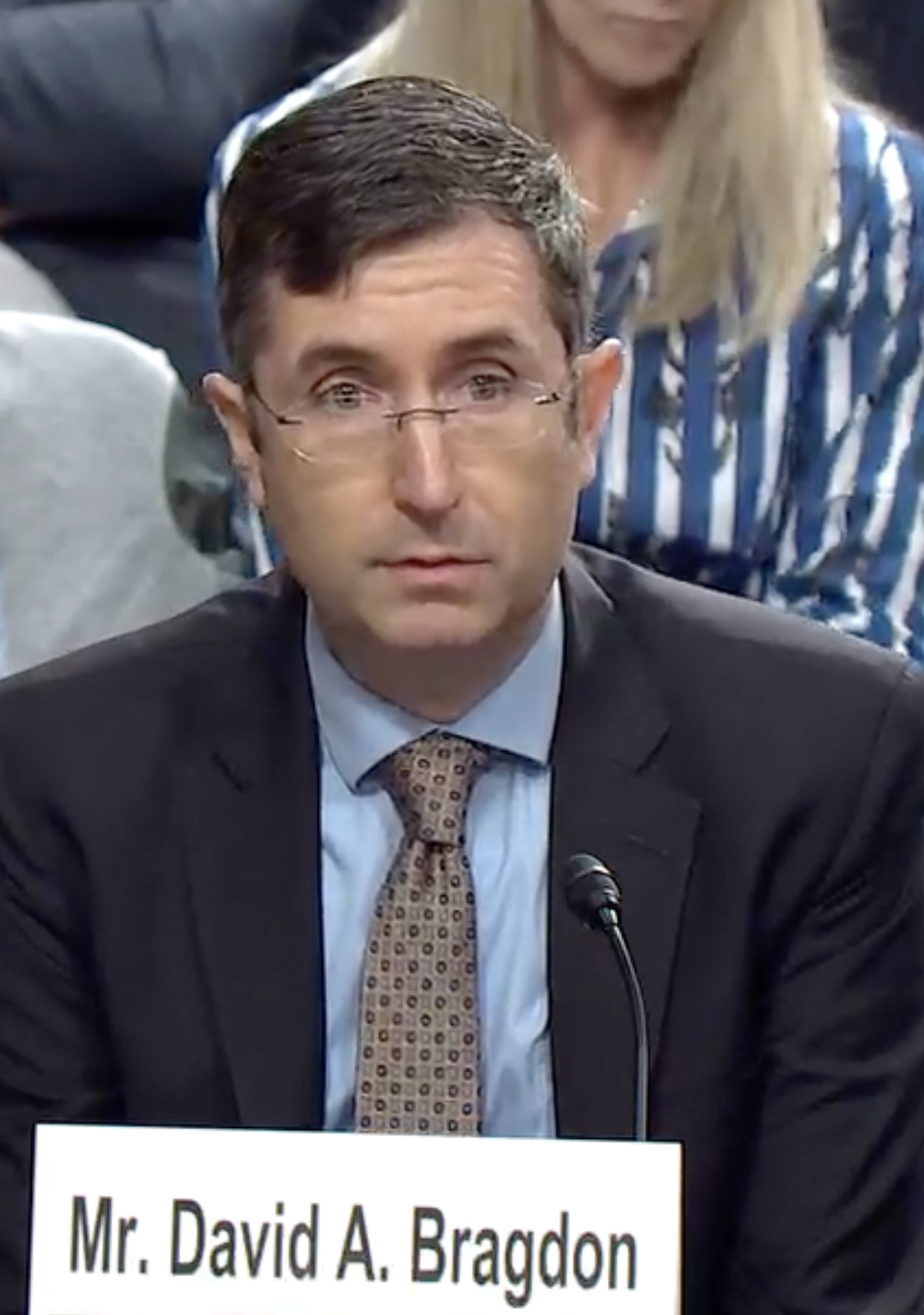

Chief Judge of the United States District Court for the Middle District of North Carolina
- Incumbent
- Assumed office November 2, 2026
- Preceded by: Catherine Eagles

Judge of the United States District Court for the Middle District of North Carolina
- Incumbent
- Assumed office December 12, 2025
- Appointed by: Donald Trump
- Preceded by: Loretta Copeland Biggs

Personal details
- Born: 1977 (age 48–49) Warren, Ohio, U.S.
- Education: Campbell University (BA); University of Virginia (JD)

David Alan Bragdon (born 1977) is a United States district judge of the United States District Court for the Middle District of North Carolina. He previously served as an assistant United States attorney in the Eastern District of North Carolina.

== Education and early life ==
Bragdon was born in 1977 in Warren, Ohio. He received a Bachelor of Arts degree in government from Campbell University in 1999 and a Juris Doctor from the University of Virginia School of Law in 2002, where he was editor of the Virginia Law Review. He served as a law clerk for Judge Stephen F. Williams of the United States Court of Appeals for the District of Columbia Circuit from 2002 to 2003.

== Career ==
Bragdon worked as an associate at Burr and Forman in their Birmingham, Alabama office from 2003 to 2006. He then clerked for Associate Justice Clarence Thomas of the United States Supreme Court from 2006 to 2007. Bragdon was hired to be an assistant United States attorney for the United States Attorney's Office for the Eastern District of North Carolina in 2007. He was promoted to chief of appeals for that office in 2021.

=== Federal judicial service ===
On August 22, 2025, President Donald Trump announced his intention to nominate Bragdon to a seat on the United States District Court for the Middle District of North Carolina vacated by Judge Loretta Copeland Biggs. The nomination was transmitted to the United States Senate on September 15, 2025. On September 17, 2025, a confirmation hearing was held for him and other nominees before the Senate Judiciary Committee. October 9, 2025, the committee voted in favor of his nomination by a 12–10 party-line vote. On December 1, 2025, the U.S. Senate voted to invoke cloture on his nomination by a vote of 50–41. The following day, his nomination was confirmed by a 53–45 vote. He received his judicial commission on December 12, 2025.

== See also ==
- List of law clerks for the tenth seat of the Supreme Court of the United States

Legal offices
Preceded by Loretta Copeland Biggs	Judge of the United States District Court for the Middle District of North Carolina; 2025–present	Incumbent
