= Lindsey Freeman =

American judge (born 1983)

Lindsey Ann Freeman
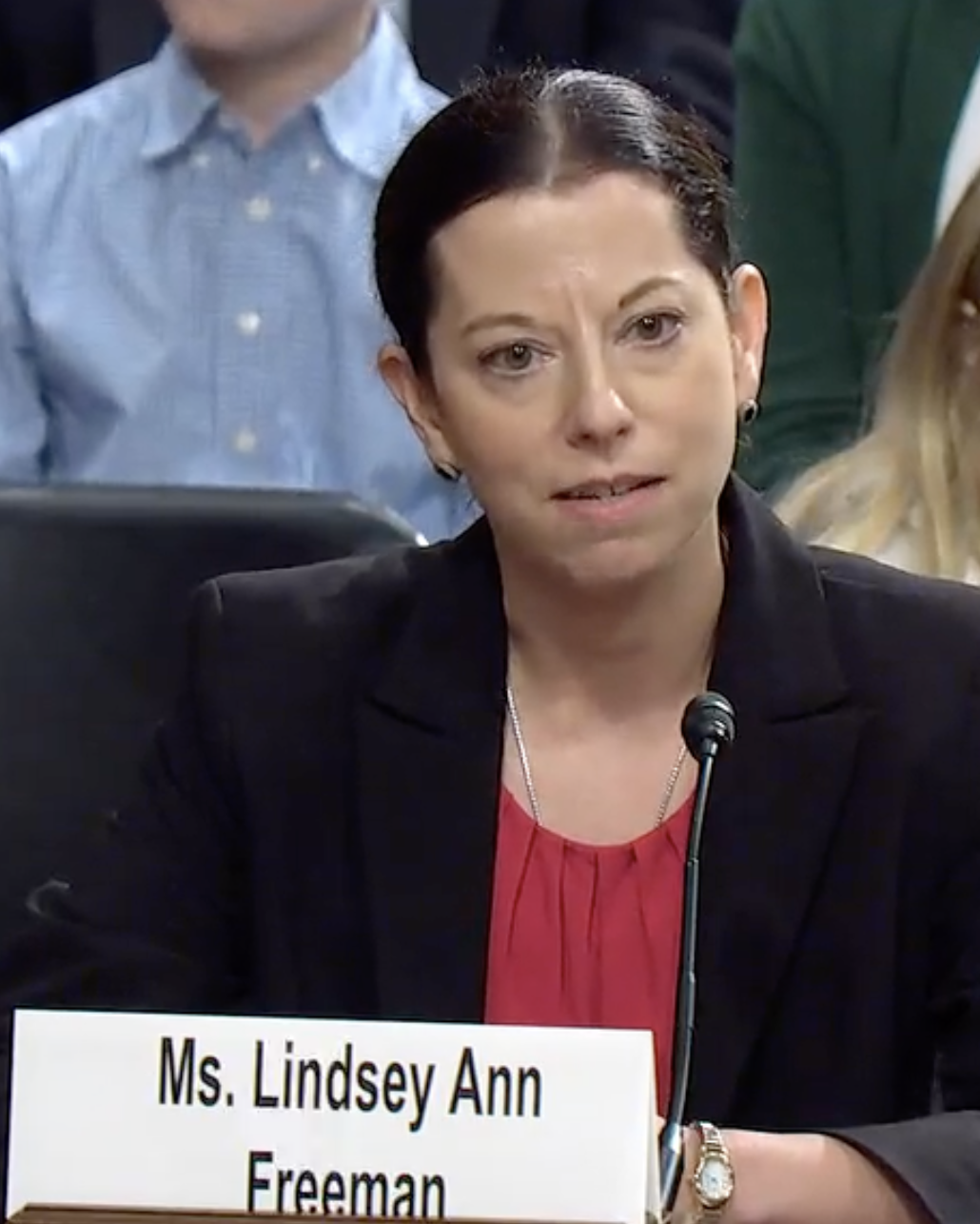

Judge of the United States District Court for the Middle District of North Carolina
- Incumbent
- Assumed office December 19, 2025
- Appointed by: Donald Trump
- Preceded by: Catherine Eagles

Personal details
- Born: 1983 (age 42–43) Austin, Texas, U.S.
- Education: Harvard University (BA); University of Pennsylvania (JD)

Lindsey Ann Freeman (born 1983) is a United States district judge of the United States District Court for the Middle District of North Carolina. She previously served as an assistant United States attorney in the Middle District of North Carolina.

== Early life and education ==
Freeman was born in 1983 in Austin, Texas. She received a Bachelor of Arts degree, magna cum laude, in 2005 from Harvard University, majoring in social studies. She received a Juris Doctor, magna cum laude and Order of the Coif, in 2011 from the University of Pennsylvania Law School, where she served as comments editor of the University of Pennsylvania Law Review. She served as a law clerk in the United States Court of Appeals for the Sixth Circuit from 2011 to 2012.

== Career ==
In 2012, Freeman was hired as counsel for the law firm of O'Melveny & Myers LLP, where she focused on antitrust, product liability, and white collar criminal law.

Freeman served as counsel in the Office of Legal Policy in the United States Department of Justice from 2017 to 2019, Chief of Staff of that same office from 2019 to 2020 and Chief of Staff and Deputy Attorney General from 2020 to 2021. In 2021, she became an Assistant United States Attorney in the Middle District of North Carolina.

=== Federal judicial service ===
On August 22, 2025, President Donald Trump announced his intention to nominate Freeman to a seat on the United States District Court for the Middle District of North Carolina vacated by Catherine Eagles. The nomination was transmitted to the United States Senate on September 15, 2025. On September 17, 2025, a confirmation hearing was held for her and other nominees before the Senate Judiciary Committee On October 9, 2025, the committee advanced her nomination by a 15–7 vote. On December 2, the Senate invoked cloture on her nomination by a 61–36 vote. Later that day, her nomination was confirmed by a 60–39 vote. She received her judicial commission on December 19, 2025.

Legal offices
Preceded by Catherine Eagles	Judge of the United States District Court for the Middle District of North Carolina; 2025–present	Incumbent
