= James A. Beaty Jr. =

American judge (born 1949)

Senior Judge of the United States District Court for the Middle District of North Carolina
- In office June 30, 2014 – January 31, 2018

Chief Judge of the United States District Court for the Middle District of North Carolina
- In office 2006–2012
- Preceded by: Norwood Carlton Tilley Jr.
- Succeeded by: William Lindsay Osteen Jr.

Judge of the United States District Court for the Middle District of North Carolina
- In office October 11, 1994 – June 30, 2014
- Appointed by: Bill Clinton
- Preceded by: Richard Erwin
- Succeeded by: Loretta Copeland Biggs

Personal details
- Born: James Arthur Beaty Jr. June 28, 1949 (age 76) Whitmire, South Carolina, U.S.
- Education: Western Carolina University (BA); University of North Carolina School of Law (JD)

James Arthur Beaty Jr. (born June 28, 1949) is a former United States district judge of the United States District Court for the Middle District of North Carolina, and a former nominee to the United States Court of Appeals for the Fourth Circuit.

== Early life, education, and career ==
Beaty was born in Whitmire, South Carolina. He received a Bachelor of Arts degree from Western Carolina University in 1971 and a Juris Doctor from the University of North Carolina School of Law in 1974. He entered private practice in Winston-Salem, North Carolina in 1974, and in 1981 he became a judge of the Superior Court of Forsyth County, North Carolina, a position he held until 1994.

== Federal judicial service ==
On August 25, 1994, President Bill Clinton nominated Beaty to fill a vacancy on the United States District Court for the Middle District of North Carolina created by the retirement of Judge Richard C. Erwin. The United States Senate unanimously confirmed Beaty in a voice vote on October 7, 1994. Beaty became chief judge of that court in 2006. He is based in Winston-Salem. He assumed senior status on June 30, 2014. He retired from active service on January 31, 2018.

== Nomination to the Fourth Circuit ==
On December 24, 1995, President Clinton nominated Beaty to the United States Court of Appeals for the Fourth Circuit to fill the vacancy created by the decision by Judge James Dickson Phillips Jr. to take senior status. Almost immediately, Beaty's nomination ran into opposition from North Carolina Senator Jesse Helms, who was angry that Clinton after taking office had refused to renominate Helms' preferred candidate, Terrence Boyle. President George H. W. Bush had nominated Boyle to a Fourth Circuit seat in 1991, but the Senate never acted on the nomination, and the nomination lapsed with the end of Bush's presidency.

The Senate Judiciary Committee did not hold a hearing or a vote on Beaty's Fourth Circuit nomination during 1996. Clinton renominated Beaty in 1997, but Helms then announced that the court had a light caseload and did not need any more judges. Helms and the Fourth Circuit's Chief Judge at the time, James Harvie Wilkinson III, even lobbied Congress to leave the seat vacant on the grounds that the seat was not needed. In addition, Beaty was accused of being an activist judge because while sitting as a visiting judge on a Fourth Circuit panel in 1995, he concurred in a decision overturning the murder conviction of Timothy Scott Sherman of Hickory, Maryland because one juror had visited the crime scene, according to a February 1999 article in the ABA Journal.

As a result of Helms' opposition, Beaty's nomination again did not receive a hearing before the Senate Judiciary Committee during 1997 or 1998. Clinton elected not to renominate Beaty to the Fourth Circuit in 1999. Ultimately, Beaty's nomination languished for more than 1,000 days, making it one of the longest appeals-court nominations in U.S. history never to be acted on by the U.S. Senate.

== Continued controversy over the Fourth Circuit's North Carolina seat ==
The Fourth Circuit seat to which Beaty was nominated remained vacant until August 10, 2010, following the confirmation of James Andrew Wynn On August 5, 1999, President Bill Clinton nominated Wynn, an African American judge on the North Carolina Court of Appeals, to replace Beaty as his nominee for the open North Carolina seat on the United States Court of Appeals for the Fourth Circuit. Wynn's nomination also never received a hearing from the Senate Judiciary Committee or received a full vote from the Senate due to the resistance of Jesse Helms, who used his previous claim that the court did not need any more judges as his justification.

Clinton renominated Wynn to the Fourth Circuit on January 3, 2001, but his nomination was returned by President Bush on March 20, 2001, along with 61 other executive and judicial nominations that Clinton had made.

Twice, President George W. Bush tried to fill the North Carolina seat. Terrence Boyle was nominated by Bush on May 9, 2001, but his nomination was never brought to a vote on the floor of the Senate. His five-year nomination was the longest-pending of the Bush administration. Boyle had been originally nominated to the Fourth Circuit in 1991 by Bush's father, President George H. W. Bush.

Boyle's nomination was adamantly opposed by Democrats from the beginning. Former North Carolina Democrat and vice presidential candidate John Edwards claimed Boyle was an opponent of civil rights and disabilities legislation. Boyle's supporters viewed Boyle as the victim of political payback and obstruction because of his ties to former North Carolina Republican Senator Jesse Helms, who derailed several judicial nominations by President Bill Clinton (Boyle was a staffer for Helms in 1973), and the perceived determination of liberal politicians not to let conservatives serve at the highest levels of the federal judiciary.

On January 9, 2007, the White House announced that it would not be re-nominating Boyle to the Court of Appeals. Boyle has clearly stated he did not withdraw his nomination.

On July 17, 2007, Bush nominated Robert J. Conrad Jr. for the seat on the United States Court of Appeals for the Fourth Circuit to take the place of the retired James Dickson Phillips Jr. Despite Republican complaints, he was not given a hearing or vote by the Senate Judiciary Committee headed by Democratic chairman, Senator Patrick Leahy.

On November 4, 2009, President Barack Obama renominated Wynn for the seat on the Fourth Circuit to which he had previously been nominated. His nomination was confirmed by the full Senate on August 5, 2010, by unanimous consent.

== See also ==
- Bill Clinton judicial appointment controversies
- List of African-American federal judges
- List of African-American jurists

Legal offices
Preceded by Richard Erwin	Judge of the United States District Court for the Middle District of North Carolina; 1994–2014	Succeeded by Loretta Copeland Biggs
Preceded by Norwood Carlton Tilley Jr.	Chief Judge of the United States District Court for the Middle District of North Carolina; 2006–2012	Succeeded by William Lindsay Osteen Jr.
