= Catherine Eagles =

American judge (born 1958)

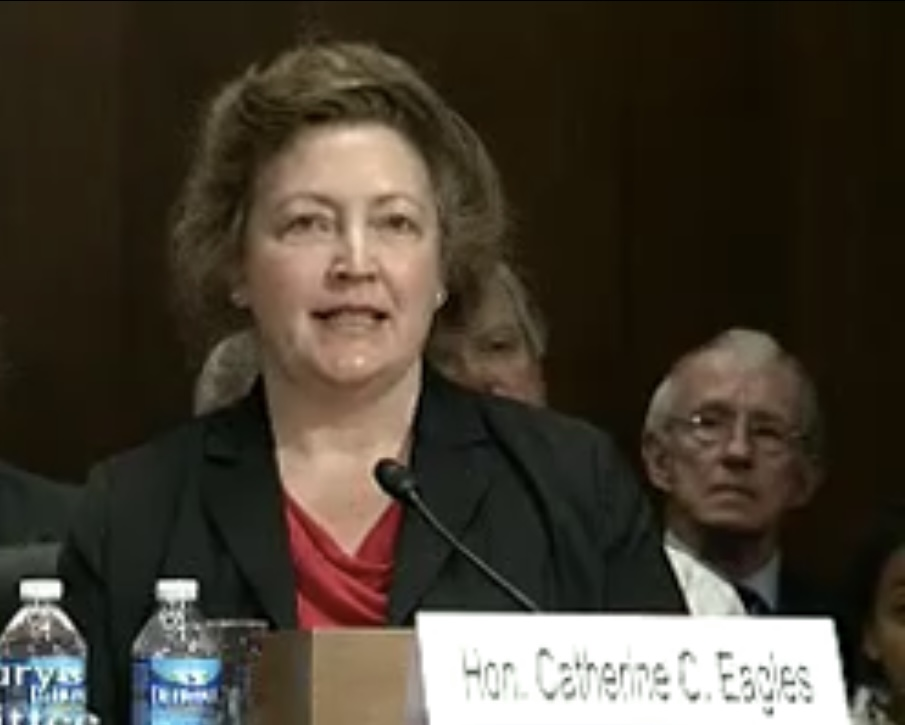

Senior Judge of the United States District Court for the Middle District of North Carolina
- Incumbent
- Assumed office December 31, 2024

Chief Judge of the United States District Court for the Middle District of North Carolina
- In office August 13, 2023 – November 2, 2026
- Preceded by: Thomas D. Schroeder
- Succeeded by: David A. Bragdon

Judge of the United States District Court for the Middle District of North Carolina
- In office December 22, 2010 – December 31, 2024
- Appointed by: Barack Obama
- Preceded by: Norwood Carlton Tilley Jr.
- Succeeded by: Lindsey Freeman

Personal details
- Born: Catherine Diane Caldwell; August 30, 1958 (age 68) Memphis, Tennessee, U.S.
- Education: Rhodes College (BA); George Washington University (JD)

Catherine Diane Caldwell Eagles (born August 30, 1958) is the chief United States district judge of the United States District Court for the Middle District of North Carolina and a former Superior Court judge in Guilford County, North Carolina. She is the first female judge to serve in the Middle District.

== Early life and education ==
Eagles was born Catherine Diane Caldwell in Memphis, Tennessee in 1958. She graduated from Rhodes College (then called Southwestern at Memphis) in 1979 with a Bachelor of Arts degree. In 1982, she earned a Juris Doctor from George Washington University Law School.

== Career ==
After law school, Eagles served as a staff law clerk for the United States Court of Appeals for the Eighth Circuit and as a clerk to Judge J. Smith Henley. After her clerkship, Eagles worked from 1984 to 1993 as an associate and partner at Smith, Helms, Mullis & Moore in Greensboro, North Carolina. In 1993 she was appointed to a seat as a resident superior court judge based in Greensboro. She was elected to serve the remainder of the term in 1994 and re-elected in 1996 and 2004 to eight-year terms. In 2006 she became the senior resident superior court judge in Guilford County.

=== Federal judicial service ===
On March 10, 2010, President Barack Obama nominated Eagles to a seat in the Middle District of North Carolina that came open when Norwood Carlton Tilley Jr. assumed senior status. Eagles had a hearing in front of the Senate Judiciary Committee on April 16, 2010, and her nomination was reported to the full Senate on May 6, 2010. The Senate approved her nomination on December 16, 2010, during the lame duck session of the 111th Congress. She received her commission on December 22, 2010. She became chief judge in 2023. She took senior status on December 31, 2024, but maintained her position as chief judge for some time afterwards.

== Notable cases ==
In 2012, she presided over U.S. v. Johnny Reid Edwards, where former presidential candidate and senator John Edwards was charged with campaign finance violations.

== See also ==
- List of first women lawyers and judges in North Carolina

Legal offices
Preceded by Norwood Carlton Tilley, Jr.	Judge of the United States District Court for the Middle District of North Carolina; 2010–2024	Succeeded by Lindsey Freeman
Preceded by Thomas D. Schroeder	Chief Judge of the United States District Court for the Middle District of North Carolina; 2023–2026	Succeeded by David A. Bragdon
