= L. Richardson Preyer =

American judge

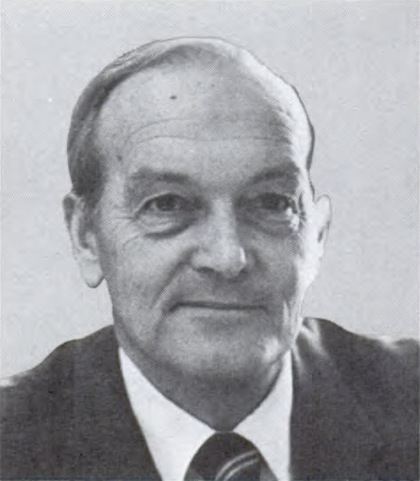

Member of the U.S. House of Representatives from North Carolina's 6th district
- In office January 3, 1969 – January 3, 1981
- Preceded by: Horace R. Kornegay
- Succeeded by: Walter E. Johnston III

Judge of the United States District Court for the Middle District of North Carolina
- In office October 7, 1961 – October 9, 1963
- Appointed by: John F. Kennedy
- Preceded by: Seat established by 75 Stat. 80
- Succeeded by: Eugene Andrew Gordon

Personal details
- Born: Lunsford Richardson Preyer; January 11, 1919 Greensboro, North Carolina, U.S.
- Died: April 3, 2001 (aged 82) Greensboro, North Carolina, U.S.
- Resting place: Green Hill Cemetery
- Party: Democratic
- Education: Princeton University (A.B.); Harvard Law School (LL.B.)

Lunsford Richardson Preyer (January 11, 1919 – April 3, 2001) was a United States district judge of the United States District Court for the Middle District of North Carolina and later a United States representative from North Carolina.

== Education and Career ==
Born in Greensboro, Guilford County, North Carolina, Preyer graduated from Woodberry Forest School in Woodberry Forest, Virginia. He received an A.B. in English from Princeton University in 1941 after completing a senior thesis titled "The Contrasting Values of Dickens and Daudet." At Princeton he was on the 150 lb. football team and the golf team and was vice-president of Princeton Tower Club. He received a Bachelor of Laws from Harvard Law School in 1949. He was in the United States Navy from 1941 to 1946, serving as gunnery officer and executive officer on destroyers in both the Atlantic and Pacific. He received a Bronze Star for action at Okinawa. He was in private practice of law in New York City, New York from 1949 to 1950. He worked for Vick Chemical Company in 1950 (founded by his grandfather and namesake Lunsford Richardson). He was in private practice of law in Greensboro from 1951 to 1956. He was a City Judge from 1953 to 1954. He was a Judge of the North Carolina Superior Court from 1956 to 1961.

== Judicial service ==
Preyer received a recess appointment from President John F. Kennedy on October 7, 1961, to the United States District Court for the Middle District of North Carolina, to a new seat created by 75 Stat. 80. He was nominated to the same seat by President Kennedy on January 15, 1962. He was confirmed by the United States Senate on February 7, 1962, and received his commission on February 17, 1962. His service was terminated on October 9, 1963, due to his resignation.

== Run for Governor ==
Preyer was an unsuccessful candidate for Governor of North Carolina in 1964. He was Senior Vice President and Trust Officer of North Carolina National Bank (now Bank of America) from 1965 to 1968.

== Congressional service ==
Preyer was elected as a Democratic United States Representative from North Carolina to the 91st United States Congress and to the five succeeding Congresses, serving from January 3, 1969, to January 3, 1981. He was Chairman of the House Ethics Committee, as well as the House Select Committee on Assassinations's, JFK Subcommittee during the 95th Congress. He was an unsuccessful candidate for reelection to the 97th Congress in 1980.

== Post congressional service and death ==
In 1988, Preyer was elected to the Common Cause National Governing Board. Preyer resided in Greensboro until his death of cancer on April 3, 2001, in that city. He is interred in Green Hill Cemetery in Greensboro.

== Honors ==
The L. Richardson Preyer Federal Building in Greensboro is named in Preyer's honor. Preyer and his wife, Emily, both received the North Carolina Award for Public Service.

== See also ==
- List of members of the House Un-American Activities Committee

== Sources ==
- Civil Rights Greensboro: Lunsford Richardson Preyer
- The Political Graveyard
- "Lunsford Richardson Preyer". Biographical Directory of the United States Congress.
- October 10, 2001 Memorials in Princeton Alumni Weekly
- North Carolina General Assembly resolution (rich text file)
- UNC giving - The L. Richardson and Emily Preyer bicentennial professorship

Legal offices
Preceded by Seat established by 75 Stat. 80	Judge of the United States District Court for the Middle District of North Carolina; 1961–1963	Succeeded by Eugene Andrew Gordon
U.S. House of Representatives
Preceded by Horace R. Kornegay	Member of the U.S. House of Representatives from North Carolina's 6th congressional district 1969–1981	Succeeded by Walter E. Johnston III
