= Eugene Andrew Gordon =

American judge

Senior Judge of the United States District Court for the Middle District of North Carolina
- In office July 12, 1982 – May 4, 2002

Chief Judge of the United States District Court for the Middle District of North Carolina
- In office 1971–1982
- Preceded by: Edwin Monroe Stanley
- Succeeded by: Hiram Hamilton Ward

Judge of the United States District Court for the Middle District of North Carolina
- In office June 9, 1964 – July 12, 1982
- Appointed by: Lyndon B. Johnson
- Preceded by: L. Richardson Preyer
- Succeeded by: Frank William Bullock Jr.

Personal details
- Born: Eugene Andrew Gordon; July 10, 1917 Brown Summit, North Carolina, U.S.
- Died: May 4, 2002 (aged 84) Greensboro, North Carolina, U.S.
- Education: Elon College (A.B.); Duke University School of Law (LL.B.)

Eugene Andrew Gordon (July 10, 1917 – May 4, 2002) was a United States district judge of the United States District Court for the Middle District of North Carolina.

== Education and career ==
Born in Brown Summit, North Carolina, Gordon received an Artium Baccalaureus degree from Elon College in 1941 and a Bachelor of Laws from Duke University School of Law in 1941. He was in private practice in Alamance County, North Carolina, from 1941 to 1942 and then served in the United States Army during World War II from 1942 to 1946. He returned to private practice from 1946 to 1964. In addition, he served as commanding officer of the National Guard in Burlington, North Carolina, from 1946 to 1947; as solicitor of the general county court of Alamance County from 1947 to 1954; and as county attorney of Alamance County from 1954 to 1964.

== Federal judicial service ==
On April 30, 1964, Gordon was nominated by President Lyndon B. Johnson to a seat on the United States District Court for the Middle District of North Carolina vacated by Judge L. Richardson Preyer. Gordon was confirmed by the United States Senate on May 27, 1964, and received his commission on June 9, 1964. He served as chief judge from 1971 to 1982, assuming senior status on July 12, 1982, and serving in that capacity until his death on May 4, 2002, in Greensboro, North Carolina.

== Sources ==
Legal offices
Preceded by L. Richardson Preyer	Judge of the United States District Court for the Middle District of North Carolina; 1964–1982	Succeeded by Frank William Bullock Jr.
Preceded by Edwin Monroe Stanley	Chief Judge of the United States District Court for the Middle District of North Carolina; 1971–1982	Succeeded by Hiram Hamilton Ward
