= Hiram Hamilton Ward =

American judge

Senior Judge of the United States District Court for the Middle District of North Carolina
- In office August 20, 1988 – April 4, 2002

Chief Judge of the United States District Court for the Middle District of North Carolina
- In office 1982–1988
- Preceded by: Eugene Andrew Gordon
- Succeeded by: Richard Erwin

Judge of the United States District Court for the Middle District of North Carolina
- In office June 28, 1972 – August 20, 1988
- Appointed by: Richard Nixon
- Preceded by: Edwin Monroe Stanley
- Succeeded by: Norwood Carlton Tilley Jr.

Personal details
- Born: Hiram Hamilton Ward; April 29, 1923 Thomasville, North Carolina, U.S.
- Died: April 4, 2002 (aged 78) Winston-Salem, North Carolina, U.S.
- Education: Wake Forest University School of Law (LL.B.)

Hiram Hamilton Ward (April 29, 1923 – April 4, 2002) was a United States district judge of the United States District Court for the Middle District of North Carolina.

== Education and career ==
Born in Thomasville, North Carolina, Ward received a Bachelor of Laws from Wake Forest University School of Law in 1950. He served in the United States Army Air Forces (rising to the rank of lieutenant colonel) from 1940 to 1945. He was in private practice in Denton, North Carolina from 1950 to 1951. He was a staff attorney for the National Production Authority in Washington, D.C. from 1951 to 1952. He was in private practice in Lexington and Denton from 1952 to 1972. He was an interim judge of the local Recorder's Court in Denton in 1961.

== Federal judicial service ==
Ward was nominated by President Richard Nixon on May 18, 1972, to a seat on the United States District Court for the Middle District of North Carolina vacated by Judge Edwin Monroe Stanley. He was confirmed by the United States Senate on June 28, 1972, and received his commission the same day. He served as Chief Judge from 1982 to 1988. He assumed senior status on August 20, 1988. Ward's service was terminated on April 4, 2002, due to his death in Winston-Salem, North Carolina.

== Sources ==
Legal offices
Preceded by Edwin Monroe Stanley	Judge of the United States District Court for the Middle District of North Carolina; 1972–1988	Succeeded by Norwood Carlton Tilley Jr.
Preceded by Eugene Andrew Gordon	Chief Judge of the United States District Court for the Middle District of North Carolina; 1982–1988	Succeeded by Richard Erwin
