= L. Richardson Preyer Federal Building =

- United States Post Office and Court House
- U.S. National Register of Historic Places
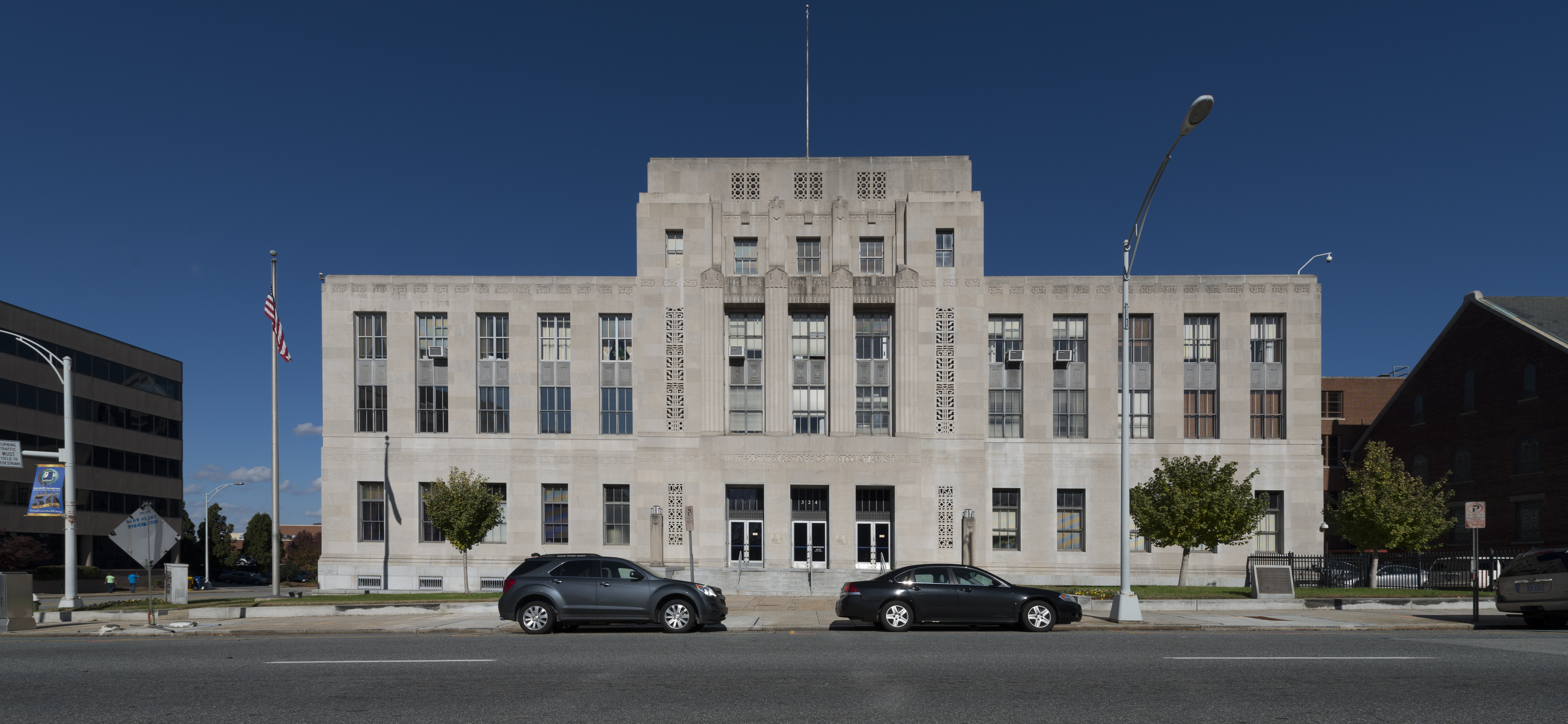

- Location within North Carolina Location within the United States
- Location: 324 W. Market St., Greensboro, North Carolina
- Coordinates: 36°4′24″N 79°47′37″W
- Area: 1.4 acres (0.57 ha)
- Built: 1933
- Built by: George H. Rommel Construction Company
- Architect: Murphy & Olmsted; Office of the Supervising Architect
- Architectural style: Art Deco
- NRHP reference No.: 14000886
- Added to NRHP: October 29, 2014

The L. Richardson Preyer Federal Building is a courthouse of the United States District Court for the Middle District of North Carolina in Greensboro, Guilford County, North Carolina. It was completed in 1933, and was renamed in honor of United States Representative and District Court judge L. Richardson Preyer in 1988. It is located at 324 West Market Street.

It was listed on the National Register of Historic Places in 2014.

== Significance ==
Built pursuant to the Public Buildings Act of 1926, the Preyer Building was designed by the Washington architectural firm of Murphy & Olmsted with supervision by the Office of the Supervising Architect under James A. Wetmore. The George H. Rommel Construction Company of Louisville, Kentucky, acted as General Contractor.

The Greensboro building was built as a post office, courthouse and Federal Building. The people of Greensboro had anxiously awaited construction of a new, badly needed facility. Construction was begun in December 1931, and when the building was dedicated on July 6, 1933, more than 5000 people attended the dedication ceremony. After the postal service moved out completely in the late 1980s, the entire first floor work space was converted to courts and related offices. As of 2010, the building serves primarily as a courthouse for the Middle District of North Carolina.

The site of the building has some significance. Prior to the construction of the Federal Building, the Sloan House, a house built of timbers of the original Guilford County Courthouse stood on the site for 100 years. It was said that the armies of General Green and Lord Cornwallis fought around this house during the Revolutionary War. Later the house was reported to be home of Greenboro's first mayor. The site is at the edge of the downtown commercial area and directly across the street from the Guilford County Government complex.

== Architectural description ==
The courthouse is an Art Deco style building. The main entrance is on the south elevation with auxiliary entrances on the north and west. The building is 202 feet 8 inches (61.77 m) at the west and east elevations and 150 feet 4 inches (45.82 m) at the north and south elevations. Originally, entries to the building were on the south, north and west for the postal lobby. At the present time, the south entry is used as the main entry; the west entry is closed and the north entry, at the basement level, is used on a limited basis.

The Federal Building and U.S. Courthouse is a four-story structure with a fully occupied basement and an attic (vacant). Resting on a Mount Airy granite base, the walls above are clad in Indiana limestone. The ornamentation is also limestone. The south, main, elevation consists of fifteen bays with the five central bays projected at the entry pavilion. The entry pavilion facade consists of the three entry doors at the first-floor level with a set-back at the third-floor level, and another set-back at the attic level. Ornamentation consists of a carved denticulated panel of the lotus motif. Windows at the second and third floors are slightly recessed and hung in pairs. They are separated by aluminum spandrel panels ornamented by a diamond motif.

The projected entry pavilion at the south elevation provides the main entry to the building. Granite steps and Crab Orchard stone terraces lead to the three-bay entry. The three-bay entry projects slightly from the pavilion. Flanking the entry doors to the east and west are carved open stone grilles. The second and third floor levels are set off by four fluted engaged pilasters with carved caps featuring the lotus motif flanked by the scrolled motif. Carved panels between the pilasters feature lotus panels separated by unornamented shields. The reveals of the recessed windows feature elongated carved panels. Aluminum separating second and third floor windows there feature the seals of the Treasury Department, Post Office Department, Department of Justice, War Department, Department of Agriculture, and Department of Labor. The fourth-floor level of the entry pavilion consists of a three-bay set-back delineated at the east and west sides by projected triangular pilasters. Scored pilasters separate the windows within the pavilion. These pilasters feature carved eagles' heads atop Federal shields.

The west elevation reveals the U-shape plan of the building. The basement level is revealed by windows at this elevation. Ornamentation is similar on this elevation as on the south. The same fretwork band as on the south elevation runs above the third floor level. The replacement double aluminum doors have a polished granite surround with paterae on the panels and an elaborate pediment. The pediment features a lotus flanked by heavy floral carving with palmetta acroterions. Open, geometric granite grilles flank the entry door. Three bays above the entry door feature open limestone, geometric grilles delineated by pilasters with carved lotus-motif panels at the third and fourth-floor levels. Decorative terra cotta and pieces from the terra cotta roof are revealed at the fourth-floor level on this elevation.

The north elevation is ornamented the same as the south except the central projected entry pavilion features only one entry door accessed by two sets of granite stairs at the stone terraces. The central stairs are flanked at the basement level by recessed entry doors leading to the north basement lobby. The polished granite surround is the same as on the west elevation, and the reveal features the same carving. Distinctive stone hexagonal light standards differ slightly at each elevation.

The interior of the building retains significant spaces in the courtroom and the south lobby. The third-floor courtroom remains in nearly original condition. Marble wainscot and original doors and furnishings highlight this area. The south lobby lost much of its character when the postal service moved out and all the boxes and windows were filled in. However, the entry foyer with its elaborate ceiling, marble walls, and original light feature is an important feature of the interior. Second and, particularly, third floor corridors add to the character of the building with original floors and door surrounds.
