= Johnson Jay Hayes =

American judge (1886–1970)

Senior Judge of the United States District Court for the Middle District of North Carolina
- In office June 18, 1957 – October 22, 1970

Judge of the United States District Court for the Middle District of North Carolina
- In office April 6, 1927 – June 18, 1957
- Appointed by: Calvin Coolidge
- Preceded by: Seat established by 44 Stat. 1339
- Succeeded by: Edwin Monroe Stanley

Personal details
- Born: Johnson Jay Hayes; January 23, 1886 Purlear, North Carolina, U.S.
- Died: October 22, 1970 (aged 84)
- Education: Wake Forest University School of Law (LL.B.)

Johnson Jay Hayes (January 23, 1886 – October 22, 1970) was a United States district judge of the United States District Court for the Middle District of North Carolina.

== Education and career ==
Born in Purlear, North Carolina, Hayes received a Bachelor of Laws from Wake Forest University School of Law in 1909. He was in private practice in Wilkesboro, North Carolina from 1909 to 1915. He was prosecuting attorney of the 17th North Carolina Judicial District from 1915 to 1926. He was in private practice in Greensboro, North Carolina in 1927.

== Federal judicial service ==
Hayes received a recess appointment from President Calvin Coolidge on April 6, 1927, to the United States District Court for the Middle District of North Carolina, to a new seat authorized by 44 Stat. 1339. He was nominated to the same position by President Coolidge on December 6, 1927. He was confirmed by the United States Senate on January 9, 1928, and received his commission the same day. He assumed senior status on June 18, 1957. His service terminated on October 22, 1970, due to his death.

== Sources ==
Party political offices
| Preceded by A. E. Holton | Republican nominee for U.S. Senator from North Carolina (Class 3); 1926 | Succeeded by Jake F. Newell |
Legal offices
| Preceded by Seat established by 44 Stat. 1339 | Judge of the United States District Court for the Middle District of North Carolina; 1927–1957 | Succeeded by Edwin Monroe Stanley |
