= Frank William Bullock Jr. =

American judge

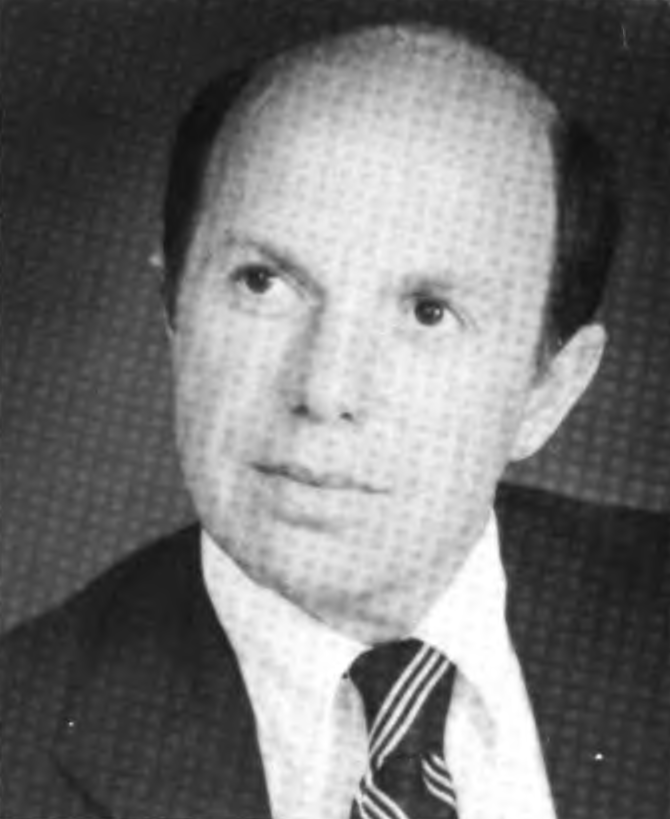

Senior Judge of the United States District Court for the Middle District of North Carolina
- In office December 31, 2005 – August 1, 2006

Chief Judge of the United States District Court for the Middle District of North Carolina
- In office 1992–1999
- Preceded by: Richard Erwin
- Succeeded by: Norwood Carlton Tilley Jr.

Judge of the United States District Court for the Middle District of North Carolina
- In office December 10, 1982 – December 31, 2005
- Appointed by: Ronald Reagan
- Preceded by: Eugene Andrew Gordon
- Succeeded by: Thomas D. Schroeder

Personal details
- Born: Frank William Bullock Jr. November 3, 1938 (age 87) Oxford, North Carolina, U.S.
- Education: University of North Carolina at Chapel Hill (B.S.); University of North Carolina School of Law (LL.B.)

Frank William Bullock Jr. (born November 3, 1938) is a former United States district judge of the United States District Court for the Middle District of North Carolina.

== Education and career ==
Bullock was born in Oxford, North Carolina. He received a Bachelor of Science from University of North Carolina at Chapel Hill in 1961, and a Bachelor of Laws from University of North Carolina School of Law in 1963. He was a law clerk for Judge Algernon Lee Butler of the United States District Court for the Eastern District of North Carolina from 1963 to 1964. He was in private practice of law in Raleigh, North Carolina, from 1964 to 1968. He was an assistant director for the Administrative Office of the Courts of North Carolina from 1968 to 1973. He was in private practice of law in Greensboro, North Carolina, from 1973 to 1982.

== Federal judicial service ==
Bullock was a federal judge of the United States District Court for the Middle District of North Carolina. Bullock was nominated by President Ronald Reagan on November 23, 1982, to a seat on the United States District Court for the Middle District of North Carolina vacated by Judge Eugene Andrew Gordon. He was confirmed by the United States Senate on December 10, 1982, and received his commission the same day. He served as Chief Judge from 1992 to 1999 and assumed senior status on December 31, 2005. Bullock's service was terminated on August 1, 2006, due to retirement.

== Sources ==
Legal offices
Preceded by Eugene Andrew Gordon	Judge of the United States District Court for the Middle District of North Carolina; 1982–2005	Succeeded by Thomas D. Schroeder
Preceded by Richard Erwin	Chief Judge of the United States District Court for the Middle District of North Carolina; 1992–1999	Succeeded by Norwood Carlton Tilley Jr.
