= United States District Court for the Middle District of North Carolina =

United States federal district court in North Carolina

- (M.D.N.C.)
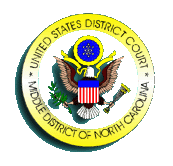
- Location: L. Richardson Preyer Federal Building (Greensboro) More locations: Winston-Salem; Durham
- Appeals to: Fourth Circuit
- Established: March 2, 1927
- Judges: 4
- Chief Judge: David A. Bragdon

Officers of the court
- U.S. Attorney: Dan Bishop
- U.S. Marshal: Catrina A. Thompson
- www.ncmd.uscourts.gov

The United States District Court for the Middle District of North Carolina (in case citations, M.D.N.C.) is a United States district court with jurisdiction over 24 counties in the center of North Carolina. It consists of five divisions with a headquarters in Greensboro, North Carolina.

Appeals from the Middle District of North Carolina are taken to the United States Court of Appeals for the Fourth Circuit (except for patent claims and claims against the U.S. government under the Tucker Act, which are appealed to the Federal Circuit).

== Jurisdiction ==
The U.S. District Court for the Middle District of North Carolina has jurisdiction over 24 counties: Alamance, Cabarrus, Caswell, Chatham, Davidson, Davie, Durham, Forsyth, Guilford, Hoke, Lee, Montgomery, Moore, Orange, Person, Randolph, Richmond, Rockingham, Rowan, Scotland, Stanly, Stokes, Surry, and Yadkin, with the exception of Federal Correctional Institution, Butner (which is partially in Durham County) and Fort Bragg Military Reservation (which is partially in Hoke, Moore, Richmond, and Scotland Counties). The latter two institutions are considered entirely part of the Eastern District of North Carolina so as to avoid them being split between two different jurisdictions as they are situated in multiple counties.

== History ==
The United States District Court for the District of North Carolina was established on June 4, 1790, by 1 Stat. 126. On June 9, 1794 it was subdivided into three districts by 1 Stat. 395, but on March 3, 1797, the three districts were abolished and the single District restored by 1 Stat. 517, until April 29, 1802, when the state was again subdivided into three different districts by 2 Stat. 156.

In both instances, these districts, unlike those with geographic designations that existed in other states, were titled by the names of the cities in which the courts sat. After the first division, they were styled the District of Edenton, the District of New Bern, and the District of Wilmington; after the second division, they were styled the District of Albemarle, the District of Cape Fear, and the District of Pamptico. However, in both instances, only one judge was authorized to serve all three districts, causing them to effectively operate as a single district. The latter combination was occasionally referred to by the cumbersome title of the United States District Court for the Albemarle, Cape Fear & Pamptico Districts of North Carolina.

On June 4, 1872, North Carolina was re-divided into two Districts, Eastern and Western, by 17 Stat. 215. The Middle District was created from portions of the Eastern and Western Districts on March 2, 1927, by 44 Stat. 1339. Shortly thereafter, President Calvin Coolidge appointed Johnson Jay Hayes by recess appointment to be the first judge of the Middle District of North Carolina.

== Current judges ==
As of November 2, 2026:

#	Title	Judge	Duty station	Born	Term of service			Appointed by
#	Title	Judge	Duty station	Born	Active	Chief	Senior	Appointed by
15	Chief Judge	David A. Bragdon	Winston-Salem	1977	2025–present	2026–present	—	Trump
11	District Judge	William Lindsay Osteen Jr.	Greensboro	1960	2007–present	2012–2017	—	G.W. Bush
12	District Judge	Thomas D. Schroeder	Winston-Salem	1959	2008–present	2017–2023	—	G.W. Bush
16	District Judge	Lindsey Freeman	Greensboro	1983	2025–present	—	—	Trump
8	Senior Judge	Norwood Carlton Tilley Jr.	Greensboro	1943	1988–2008	1999–2006	2008–present	Reagan
13	Senior Judge	Catherine Eagles	Greensboro	1958	2010–2024	2023–2026	2024–present	Obama
14	Senior Judge	Loretta Copeland Biggs	Winston-Salem	1954	2014–2024	—	2024–present	Obama

== Vacancies and pending nominations ==
Seat	Prior judge's duty station	Seat last held by	Vacancy reason	Date of vacancy	Nominee	Date of nomination
4	Greensboro	William Lindsay Osteen Jr.	Senior status	January 2, 2027	Philip Aubart	November 9, 2026
2	Winston-Salem	Thomas D. Schroeder	Senior status	TBD	–	–

== Former judges ==
#	Judge	Born–died	Active service	Chief Judge	Senior status	Appointed by	Reason for termination
1	Johnson Jay Hayes	1886–1970	1927–1957 (Note: Recess appointment; formally nominated on December 6, 1927, confirmed by the United States Senate on January 9, 1928, and received commission the same day)	—	1957–1970	Coolidge	death
2	Edwin Monroe Stanley	1909–1971	1957–1971 (Note: Recess appointment; formally nominated on January 13, 1958, confirmed by the Senate on February 25, 1958, and received commission on February 27, 1958)	1961–1971	—	Eisenhower	death
3	L. Richardson Preyer	1919–2001	1961–1963 (Note: Recess appointment; formally nominated on January 15, 1962, confirmed by the Senate on February 7, 1962, and received commission on February 17, 1962)	—	—	Kennedy	resignation
4	Eugene Andrew Gordon	1917–2002	1964–1982	1971–1982	1982–2002	L. Johnson	death
5	Hiram Hamilton Ward	1923–2002	1972–1988	1982–1988	1988–2002	Nixon	death
6	Richard Erwin	1923–2006	1980–1992	1988–1992	1992–2006	Carter	death
7	Frank William Bullock Jr.	1938–2026	1982–2005	1992–1999	2005–2006	Reagan	retirement
9	William Lindsay Osteen Sr.	1930–2009	1991–2006	—	2006–2007	G.H.W. Bush	retirement
10	James A. Beaty Jr.	1949–present	1994–2014	2006–2012	2014–2018	Clinton	retirement

== Chief judges ==
Chief judges have administrative responsibilities with respect to their district court. Unlike the Supreme Court, where one justice is specifically nominated to be chief, the office of chief judge rotates among the district court judges. To be chief, a judge must have been in active service on the court for at least one year, be under the age of 65, and have not previously served as chief judge.

A vacancy is filled by the judge highest in seniority among the group of qualified judges. The chief judge serves for a term of seven years, or until age 70, whichever occurs first. The age restrictions are waived if no members of the court would otherwise be qualified for the position.

When the office was created in 1948, the chief judge was the longest-serving judge who had not elected to retire, on what has since 1958 been known as senior status, or declined to serve as chief judge. After August 6, 1959, judges could not become or remain chief after turning 70 years old. The current rules have been in operation since October 1, 1982.

== Succession of seats ==
Seat 1
Seat established on March 2, 1927 by 44 Stat. 1339
Hayes	1928–1957
Stanley	1958–1971
Ward	1972–1988
Tilley, Jr.	1988–2008
Eagles	2010–2024
Freeman	2025–present

Seat 2
Seat established on May 19, 1961 by 75 Stat. 80
Preyer	1961–1963
Gordon	1964–1982
Bullock, Jr.	1982–2005
Schroeder	2008–present

Seat 3
Seat established on October 20, 1978 by 92 Stat. 1629
Erwin	1980–1992
Beaty, Jr.	1994–2014
Biggs	2014–2024
Bragdon	2025–present

Seat 4
Seat established on December 1, 1990 by 104 Stat. 5089
Osteen, Sr.	1991–2006
Osteen, Jr.	2007–present

== U.S. attorneys for the Middle District ==
- Frank A. Linney (1927–1928)
- Edwin L. Gavin (1928–1932)
- John R. McCrary (1932–1934)
- Carlisle W. Higgins (1934–1947)
- Bryce R. Holt (1947–1954)
- Edwin M. Stanley (1954–1957)
- Robert L. Gavin (1957–1958)
- James E. Holshouser, Sr. (1958–1961)
- Lafayette Williams (1961)
- William H. Murdock (1961–1969)
- William Lindsay Osteen Sr. (1969–1974)
- N. Carlton Tilley Jr. (1974–1977)
- Benjamin H. White, Jr. (1977)
- Mickey Michaux (1977–1980)
- Kenneth W. McAllister (1981–1986)
- Robert H. Edmunds Jr. (1986–1993)
- Benjamin H. White, Jr. (1993)
- Walter C. Holton Jr. (1994–2001)
- Anna Mills Wagoner (2001–2010)
- Ripley Rand (2010–2017)
- Sandra J. Hairston (2017–2018)
- Matthew G.T. Martin (2018–2021)
- Sandra J. Hairston (2021–2025)
- Dan Bishop (2025–)

== See also ==
- Courts of North Carolina
- List of current United States district judges
- List of United States federal courthouses in North Carolina
- United States District Court for the Eastern District of North Carolina
- United States District Court for the Western District of North Carolina
- Salisbury District, historic legislative district
