= 2010 North Carolina judicial elections =

One justice of the North Carolina Supreme Court and five judges of the North Carolina Court of Appeals were elected by North Carolina voters on November 2, 2010, on the same day as the U.S. Senate election, U.S. House elections, and other state-level elections. North Carolina judicial elections are non-partisan. Terms for seats on each court are eight years. All incumbent judges and justices who sought re-election won their respective races, except for Judge Cressie Thigpen of the Court of Appeals, who had been appointed shortly before the election and lost North Carolina's first statewide election to use Instant-runoff voting.

== Supreme Court (Seat 1) ==
Incumbent Edward Thomas Brady did not file to run for re-election. N.C. Court of Appeals Judges Bob Hunter and Barbara Jackson filed to run for the open seat.

North Carolina Supreme Court Associate Justice (Seat 1) general election, 2010
Party	Candidate	Votes	%
Nonpartisan	Barbara Jackson	1,043,850	51.86%
Nonpartisan	Bob Hunter	969,019	48.14%
Total votes		2,012,869	100%

== Court of Appeals (Seat 1) ==
When longtime Court of Appeals Judge James Andrew Wynn was appointed and confirmed as a judge of the U.S. Court of Appeals for the Fourth Circuit, that triggered a special election for his seat. Under state law, because the vacancy in Wynn's seat occurred after the state's primary elections, the election employed instant runoff voting—the first time such a mechanism had been used in a statewide election in North Carolina. The law that allowed for instant runoff voting for judicial elections was eventually repealed in 2013.

Governor Perdue appointed Cressie Thigpen to fill the seat through the election. Thigpen then filed to run for the full eight-year term, as did twelve other candidates, including attorneys Chris Dillon, Anne Middleton, John Sullivan and Pamela Vesper, all of Raleigh; attorney J. Wesley Casteen of Wilmington; attorney Daniel Garner of Wake Forest; attorneys John Bloss, Jewel Ann Farlow (a 2008 candidate) and Stan Hammer, all of Greensboro; Superior Court Judge Mark E. Klass (who had previously run for the Calabria seat); former Court of Appeals Judge Douglas McCullough; and former North Carolina Commissioner of Labor Harry Payne.

=== IRV first round results ===
North Carolina Court of Appeals Judge (Seat 1) 1st round general election, 2010
Party	Candidate	Votes	%
Nonpartisan	Cressie Thigpen (incumbent)	395,220	20.33%
Nonpartisan	Douglas McCullough	295,619	15.21%
Nonpartisan	Chris Dillon	201,870	10.39%
Nonpartisan	Anne Middleton	174,556	8.98%
Nonpartisan	Daniel E. Garner	153,971	7.92%
Nonpartisan	Jewel Ann Farlow	151,747	7.81%
Nonpartisan	Harry Payne	99,257	5.11%
Nonpartisan	Stan Hammer	96,451	4.96%
Nonpartisan	Mark E. Klass	90,526	4.66%
Nonpartisan	Pamela M. Vesper	90,116	4.64%
Nonpartisan	John F. Bloss	78,857	4.06%
Nonpartisan	John Sullivan	69,971	3.60%
Nonpartisan	J. Wesley Casteen	45,610	2.35%
Total votes		1,943,771	100%

=== IRV second round results ===
Cressie Thigpen and Doug McCullough collected the most first-choice votes, while no candidate received fifty percent plus one vote. Therefore, the two advanced to the instant runoff, where second and third choices would be tallied to determine the winner. The State Board of Elections announced on Nov. 3 that it would be "at least a month" before the results would be known. Unofficial results were released in December, showing McCullough winning by about 6,000 votes. Thigpen called for a recount. The recount showed a slightly changed vote total, but the ultimate result was the same, and Thigpen conceded defeat.

North Carolina Court of Appeals Judge (Seat 1) 2nd round general election, 2010
Party	Candidate	Votes	%
Nonpartisan	Douglas McCullough	543,980	50.31%
Nonpartisan	Cressie Thigpen (incumbent)	537,325	49.69%
Total votes		1,081,305	100%

== Court of Appeals (Seat 2) ==
Incumbent Ann Marie Calabria first announced that she would not seek re-election, but then reversed course and filed to run for another term. Judge Calabria had intended to run for re-election until her mother's health declined. Then, her mother's health improved before the deadline to file as a candidate. Other candidates who filed for the seat included state District Court Judge Jane P. Gray of Wake County and Superior Court Judge Mark E. Klass of Davidson County. Because more than two candidates filed for the seat, a primary election was held on May 4 to eliminate one candidate. Calabria won the primary with 37 percent, while Gray came in second with 36 percent of the vote. Klass, who took 26 percent, was eliminated. Calabria and Gray faced off in the general election.

North Carolina Court of Appeals Judge (Seat 2) primary election, 2010
Party	Candidate	Votes	%
Nonpartisan	Ann Marie Calabria (incumbent)	264,625	36.94%
Nonpartisan	Jane Gray	259,635	36.24%
Nonpartisan	Mark E. Klass	192,165	26.82%
Total votes		716,425	100%

North Carolina Court of Appeals Judge (Seat 2) general election, 2010
Party	Candidate	Votes	%
Nonpartisan	Ann Marie Calabria (incumbent)	1,047,081	53.65%
Nonpartisan	Jane Gray	904,544	46.35%
Total votes		1,951,625	100%

== Court of Appeals (Seat 3) ==
Incumbent Rick Elmore filed to run for re-election. Attorney Leto Copeley of Orange County, law clerk and 2005 law school graduate Steven Walker, and attorney Alton D. (Al) Bain also filed. Because more than two candidates filed for the seat, a primary election was held on May 4. Walker was the highest vote getter in the primary with 38 percent, followed by Elmore with 28 percent. Copeley, with 18 percent, and Bain, with 14 percent, were eliminated from the race. Walker and Elmore faced off in the general election.

North Carolina Court of Appeals Judge (Seat 3) primary election, 2010
Party	Candidate	Votes	%
Nonpartisan	Steven Walker	264,652	38.52%
Nonpartisan	Rick Elmore (incumbent)	197,668	28.77%
Nonpartisan	Leto Copeley	123,336	17.95%
Nonpartisan	Alton D. "Al" Bain	101,431	14.76%
Total votes		687,087	100%

North Carolina Court of Appeals Judge (Seat 3) general election, 2010
Party	Candidate	Votes	%
Nonpartisan	Rick Elmore (incumbent)	956,283	53.77%
Nonpartisan	Steven Walker	822,066	46.23%
Total votes		1,778,349	100%

== Court of Appeals (Seat 14) ==
Incumbent Sanford Steelman Jr. announced in 2009 that he would run for re-election to a second term. No candidates filed to oppose him.

North Carolina Court of Appeals Judge (Seat 14) general election, 2010
Party	Candidate	Votes	%
Nonpartisan	Sanford Steelman Jr. (incumbent)	1,404,649	100%
Total votes		1,404,649	100%

== Court of Appeals (Seat 15) ==
Incumbent Martha Geer was opposed by appeals referee and adjunct law instructor Dean R. Poirier.

North Carolina Court of Appeals Judge (Seat 15) general election, 2010
Party	Candidate	Votes	%
Nonpartisan	Martha Geer (incumbent)	1,122,392	59.87%
Nonpartisan	Dean R. Poirier	752,326	40.13%
Total votes		1,874,718	100%

== See also ==
- 2010 North Carolina elections
- 2010 United States Senate election in North Carolina
- 2010 United States House of Representatives elections in North Carolina
