= 2018 North Carolina judicial elections =

One justice of the seven-member North Carolina Supreme Court and three judges of the 15-member North Carolina Court of Appeals were elected by North Carolina voters on November 6, 2018, concurrently with other state elections. Terms for seats on each court are eight years. These elections were partisan for the first time since the elections of 2002. A law passed by the North Carolina General Assembly in 2017 cancelled primary elections for judicial elections in 2018 only, meaning that an unlimited number of candidates from any party could run in the general election.

Democrats won all four races in November 2018, representing an increase of one Democrat on the Supreme Court and an increase of two Democrats on the Court of Appeals (with one Democrat elected to the seat he already held by appointment).

== Supreme Court ==
2018 North Carolina Supreme Court election
- November 6, 2018

1 seat of the Supreme Court of North Carolina
	Majority party	Minority party
Party	Democratic	Republican
Last election	4	3
Seats won	1	0
Seats after	5	2
Seat change	▲1	▼1

2018 North Carolina Supreme Court Associate Justice Seat 1 election
- November 6, 2018

Candidate	Anita Earls	Barbara Jackson	Chris Anglin
Party	Democratic	Republican	Republican
Popular vote	1,812,751	1,246,263	598,753
Percentage	49.56%	34.07%	16.37%
- County results Earls: 30-40% 40-50% 50–60% 60–70% 70-80% 80-90% Jackson: 30-40% 40-50% 50-60%
Associate Justice before election
Barbara Jackson
Republican
Elected Associate Justice
Anita Earls
Democratic

Justice Barbara Jackson ran for re-election to a second eight-year term.

Christopher Anglin, a registered Democrat, changed his party affiliation to Republican in early June, before registering as a candidate on the last day of filing period. In response, the North Carolina General Assembly passed a bill in July, Senate Bill 3, that would require judicial candidates to be registered with their party label for at least 90 days. If a candidate had not been registered for 90 days with a party, their name would appear on the ballot without a party label. Governor Cooper vetoed the bill, but the General Assembly overrode it. Anglin sued in the Wake County Superior Court, and the Court struck down parts of Senate Bill 3, allowing Anglin to be listed on the ballot as Republican.

=== Candidates ===
- Christopher Anglin (Republican), managing partner at Anglin Law Firm
- Anita Earls (Democratic), former executive director of the Southern Coalition for Social Justice, former Deputy Assistant Attorney General for Civil Rights at the U.S. Department of Justice (1998–2000), and former member of the North Carolina State Board of Elections (2009–2011)
- Barbara Jackson (Republican), incumbent associate justice

=== Endorsements ===
Anita Earls (D)

Federal officials

- G. K. Butterfield, U.S. representative for North Carolina's 1st congressional district
- Eric Holder, former United States Attorney General (2009–2015)

Statewide officials

- Jim Hunt, former governor of North Carolina (1977–1985, 1993–2001)

Labor unions

- NC AFL-CIO

Political parties

- North Carolina Democratic Party

Organizations

- Emily's List
- Equality North Carolina
- People's Alliance PAC

Newspapers and other media

- The Charlotte Observer
- The Daily Kos
- The News & Observer
Barbara Jackson (R)

Statewide officials

- Cherie Berry, North Carolina Commissioner of Labor
- Burley Mitchell, former Chief Justice (1995–1999)

Political parties

- North Carolina Republican Party

Newspapers and other media

- The Rhino Times

=== Polling ===
Poll source	Date(s) administered	Sample size	Margin of error	Barbara Jackson (R)	Anita Earls (D)	Chris Anglin (R)	Undecided
SurveyUSA	October 26–29, 2018	659 (LV)	± 6.0%	22%	44%	19%	16%
Public Policy Polling (D)	October 26–28, 2018	675 (LV)	–	23%	37%	14%	26%
SurveyUSA	October 2–6, 2018	561 (LV)	± 5.0%	15%	43%	22%	21%
Harper Polling (R)	September 4–7, 2018	500 (LV)	± 4.4%	11%	38%	7%	44%
National Research Inc.	June 7 & 9–10, 2018	600 (LV)	± 4.0%	35%	35%	–	29%
Civitas, Inc. (R)	February 6–8, 2018	1000 (RV)	± 3.0%	43%	31%	–	22%

=== Results ===
2018 North Carolina Supreme Court Associate Justice Seat 1 election
Party	Candidate	Votes	%
Democratic	Anita Earls	1,812,751	49.56%
Republican	Barbara Jackson (incumbent)	1,246,263	34.07%
Republican	Christopher Anglin	598,753	16.37%
Total votes		3,657,767	100.0%
Democratic gain from Republican			

== Court of Appeals Seat 1 (Arrowood seat) ==
The seat held by Judge John S. Arrowood was on the 2018 ballot. Arrowood was appointed to the seat in 2017 to fill the vacancy caused by the resignation of Judge Douglas McCullough.

=== Candidates ===
- John S. Arrowood (Democrat), incumbent Judge
- Andrew Heath (Republican), North Carolina Superior Court judge and budget director under former Governor of North Carolina Pat McCrory

=== Results ===
North Carolina State Court of Appeals Seat 1 election, 2018
Party	Candidate	Votes	%
Democratic	John S. Arrowood (incumbent)	1,855,728	50.79%
Republican	Andrew Heath	1,797,929	49.21%
Total votes		3,653,657	100.0%
Democratic hold			

== Court of Appeals Seat 2 (Calabria seat) ==
The seat held by Judge Ann Marie Calabria, a Republican, was on the 2018 ballot. Calabria did not run for reelection.

=== Candidates ===
- Jefferson Griffin (Republican), Wake County district court judge
- Toby Hampson (Democratic), attorney at Wyrick, Robbins, Yates & Ponton, LLP
- Sandra Ray (Republican), New Hanover County district court judge

=== Results ===
North Carolina State Court of Appeals Seat 2 election, 2018
Party	Candidate	Votes	%
Democratic	Tobias Hampson	1,766,470	48.79%
Republican	Jefferson Griffin	1,293,098	35.72%
Republican	Sandra Ray	561,015	15.50%
Total votes		3,620,583	100.0%
Democratic gain from Republican			

== Court of Appeals Seat 3 (Elmore seat) ==
The seat held by Judge Rick Elmore, a Republican, was on the 2018 ballot. Elmore announced in 2017 that he would not seek a third term.

=== Candidates ===
- Allegra Collins (Democratic), law professor at Campbell University School of Law
- Chuck Kitchen (Republican), private practice attorney
- Michael Monaco (Libertarian), attorney and partner at Monaco & Roberts, PLLC

=== Results ===
North Carolina State Court of Appeals Seat 3 election, 2018
Party	Candidate	Votes	%
Democratic	Allegra Katherine Collins	1,773,702	48.58%
Republican	Chuck Kitchen	1,709,847	46.83%
Libertarian	Michael Monaco, Sr.	167,773	4.59%
Total votes		3,651,322	100.0%
Democratic gain from Republican			
