= 2002 North Carolina judicial elections =

Several justices of the North Carolina Supreme Court and judges of the North Carolina Court of Appeals were elected to eight-year terms by North Carolina voters on November 5, 2002. Party primary elections were held on September 10. This was the last year in which statewide judicial elections were partisan.

The result of the election was that all incumbent Democrats went down to defeat, and only one Democrat won a seat that was open (i.e. the incumbent chose not to run for another term).

== Supreme Court (Seat 1) ==
Incumbent G. K. Butterfield, a Democrat, had been appointed by Gov. Mike Easley and faced election for the first time. He was defeated by attorney Edward Thomas Brady, a Republican.

In the Republican primary, Brady had defeated Judge Ralph A. Walker.

North Carolina Supreme Court Associate Justice (Seat 1) Republican primary election, 2002
| Party | Candidate | Votes | % |
|---|---|---|---|
| Republican | Edward Thomas Brady | 162,956 | 50.24% |
| Republican | Ralph Walker | 161,420 | 49.76% |
| Total votes | | 324,376 | 100% |

North Carolina Supreme Court Associate Justice (Seat 1) general election, 2002
| Party | Candidate | Votes | % |
|---|---|---|---|
| Republican | Edward Thomas Brady | 1,159,476 | 53.87% |
| Democratic | G. K. Butterfield (incumbent) | 992,603 | 46.12% |
| Total votes | | 2,152,079 | 100% |
| Republican gain from Democratic | | | |

== Supreme Court (Seat 2) ==
Incumbent Bob Orr, a Republican, defeated North Carolina Court of Appeals Judge Bob Hunter, a Democrat.

In the Democratic primary, Hunter had defeated attorney Bradley K. Greenway.

North Carolina Supreme Court Associate Justice (Seat 2) Democratic primary election, 2002
| Party | Candidate | Votes | % |
|---|---|---|---|
| Democratic | Bob Hunter | 351,350 | 71.90% |
| Democratic | Bradley K. Greenway | 137,304 | 28.10% |
| Total votes | | 488,654 | 100% |

North Carolina Supreme Court Associate Justice (Seat 2) general election, 2002
| Party | Candidate | Votes | % |
|---|---|---|---|
| Republican | Bob Orr (incumbent) | 1,189,751 | 54.65% |
| Democratic | Bob Hunter | 987,447 | 45.35% |
| Total votes | | 2,177,198 | 100% |
| Republican hold | | | |

== Court of Appeals (Seat 2) ==
Incumbent Wanda Bryant, a Democrat, was defeated by District Court Judge Ann Marie Calabria, a Republican.

In the Republican primary, Calabria had defeated Nathanael K. (Nate) Pendley.

North Carolina Court of Appeals Judge (Seat 2) Republican primary election, 2002
| Party | Candidate | Votes | % |
|---|---|---|---|
| Republican | Ann Marie Calabria | 182,803 | 56.77% |
| Republican | Nathanael K. (Nate) Pendley | 139,180 | 43.23% |
| Total votes | | 321,983 | 100% |

North Carolina Court of Appeals Judge (Seat 2) general election, 2002
| Party | Candidate | Votes | % |
|---|---|---|---|
| Republican | Ann Marie Calabria | 1,108,615 | 52.07% |
| Democratic | Wanda Bryant (incumbent) | 1,020,286 | 47.93% |
| Total votes | | 2,128,901 | 100% |
| Republican gain from Democratic | | | |

== Court of Appeals (Seat 3) ==
In the open-seat contest, Rick Elmore, a Republican, defeated George R. Barrett, a Democrat.

In the Democratic primary, Barrett had defeated Beecher Reynolds Gray. In the Republican primary, Elmore had defeated Fritz Mercer.

North Carolina Court of Appeals Judge (Seat 3) Democratic primary election, 2002
| Party | Candidate | Votes | % |
|---|---|---|---|
| Democratic | George R. Barrett | 256,016 | 53.53% |
| Democratic | Beecher Reynolds Gray | 222,263 | 46.47% |
| Total votes | | 478,279 | 100% |

North Carolina Court of Appeals Judge (Seat 3) Republican primary election, 2002
| Party | Candidate | Votes | % |
|---|---|---|---|
| Republican | Rick Elmore | 178,759 | 57.85% |
| Republican | Fritz Mercer | 130,271 | 42.15% |
| Total votes | | 309,030 | 100% |

North Carolina Court of Appeals Judge (Seat 3) general election, 2002
| Party | Candidate | Votes | % |
|---|---|---|---|
| Republican | Rick Elmore | 1,109,317 | 52.05% |
| Democratic | George R. Barrett | 1,022,078 | 47.95% |
| Total votes | | 2,131,395 | 100% |
| Republican hold | | | |

== Court of Appeals (Seat 12) ==
Incumbent Hugh Brown Campbell Jr., a Democrat, was defeated by District Court Judge Eric Levinson, a Republican.

In the Republican primary, Levinson had defeated Lorrie L. Dollar.

North Carolina Court of Appeals Judge (Seat 12) Republican primary election, 2002
| Party | Candidate | Votes | % |
|---|---|---|---|
| Republican | Eric Levinson | 168,835 | 52.42% |
| Republican | Lorrie L. Dollar | 153,244 | 47.58% |
| Total votes | | 322,079 | 100% |

North Carolina Court of Appeals Judge (Seat 12) general election, 2002
| Party | Candidate | Votes | % |
|---|---|---|---|
| Republican | Eric Levinson | 1,089,728 | 51.01% |
| Democratic | Hugh Brown Campbell Jr. (incumbent) | 1,046,594 | 48.99% |
| Total votes | | 2,136,322 | 100% |
| Republican gain from Democratic | | | |

== Court of Appeals (Seat 14) ==
Incumbent Loretta Copeland Biggs, a Democrat, was narrowly defeated by Sanford Steelman Jr., a Republican. There were no primaries.

North Carolina Court of Appeals Judge (Seat 14) general election, 2002
| Party | Candidate | Votes | % |
|---|---|---|---|
| Republican | Sanford Steelman Jr. | 1,083,194 | 50.86% |
| Democratic | Loretta Copeland Biggs (incumbent) | 1,046,689 | 49.14% |
| Total votes | | 2,129,883 | 100% |
| Republican gain from Democratic | | | |

== Court of Appeals (Seat 15) ==
In the open-seat contest, Martha Geer, a Democrat, narrowly defeated Bill Constangy, a Republican.

In the Democratic primary, Geer had defeated Marcus W. Williams.

North Carolina Court of Appeals Judge (Seat 15) Democratic primary election, 2002
| Party | Candidate | Votes | % |
|---|---|---|---|
| Democratic | Martha Geer | 278,380 | 55.07% |
| Democratic | Marcus W. Williams | 227,092 | 44.93% |
| Total votes | | 505,472 | 100% |

North Carolina Court of Appeals Judge (Seat 15) general election, 2002
| Party | Candidate | Votes | % |
|---|---|---|---|
| Democratic | Martha Geer | 1,073,423 | 50.35% |
| Republican | Bill Constangy | 1,058,485 | 49.65% |
| Total votes | | 2,131,908 | 100% |
| Democratic hold | | | |
