= Toby Hampson =

American judge

Judge of the North Carolina Court of Appeals
- Incumbent
- Assumed office January 1, 2019
- Preceded by: Ann Marie Calabria

Personal details
- Born: December 20, 1975 (age 50) Basingstoke, England
- Party: Democratic
- Education: American University; Campbell University (JD)

Tobias "Toby" Hampson (born December 20, 1975) is an attorney and judge of the North Carolina Court of Appeals.

== Early life and education ==
Hampson was born in Basingstoke, England in 1975. He spent most of his childhood growing up in Moore County, North Carolina, where he attended Union Pines High School in Cameron. He graduated from the North Carolina School of Science and Mathematics in 1994, and then went on to earn an undergraduate degree in international studies and history from American University in 1998. He earned his Juris Doctor degree from Campbell University's Norman Adrian Wiggins School of Law (commonly known as Campbell Law) in 2002. During his time at Campbell Law, he served as a member of the Law Review and was inducted into the The Order of Barristers, a law school honor society.

== Legal career ==
After graduating from Campbell Law, he worked as a law clerk to judges K. Edward Greene, Wanda Bryant and Robert C. Hunter of the North Carolina Court of Appeals from 2002 to 2004. He then switched to private practice, working as an associate attorney at Patterson Dilthey in Raleigh. During his time at Patterson Dilthey, he mostly worked on cases with the North Carolina Court of Appeals and the state Supreme Court. From 2007 until his election to the Court of Appeals, Hampson practiced at Wyrick, Robbins, Yates & Ponton in Raleigh, where he became a partner in 2014 and led the firm's appellate practice group. In an interview with The Charlotte Observer during his 2018 election, he noted that he was the counsel of record on 186 different North Carolina Court of Appeals and Supreme Court decisions when he was in private practice.

== North Carolina judicial service ==
=== 2018 Court of Appeals election ===
Hampson ran as a Democrat for Seat 2 of the North Carolina Court of Appeals in the 2018 North Carolina judicial elections, an open seat that was previously held by retiring Republican judge Ann Marie Calabria. The election was held under a one-election cycle system in which judicial races were partisan, but no judicial primaries were held. This allowed multiple candidates from the same party to appear on the general election ballot. Hampson's opponents in the election were Wake County District Court judge Jefferson Griffin, who was officially endorsed by the North Carolina Republican Party, and Wilmington District Court judge Sandra Ray, who also ran as a Republican.

Hampson won the election to an eight-year term on the Court of Appeals, ending in 2026. He took office in January 2019.

=== Court of Appeals tenure ===
Hampson has been a part of several notable Court of Appeals panels during his tenure on the court. In 2020, Hampson wrote the 2020 unanimous Court of Appeals opinion in Holmes v. Moore, which ordered a preliminary injunction against North Carolina's 2018 voter identification law and argued that there was discriminatory intent in its initial passage. Hampson also wrote a 2022 unanimous opinion in Coastal Conservation v. State of North Carolina, where he held that sovereign immunity did not bar the plaintiffs from making state constitutional claims over state management of coastal fisheries. In a 2-1 decision in 2025, Hampson authored the opinion on No Limit Games v. Sheriff of Robeson County, which held that certain sweepstakes video game machines violated North Carolina's gambling law.

In 2025, Hampson dissented from a 2-1 Court of Appeals ruling in Republican Jefferson Griffin's challenge to the 2024 North Carolina Supreme Court election results, arguing that Griffin had not identified any challenged voter was actually ineligible.

=== 2026 Court of Appeals election ===
Hampson sought re-election in 2026 to Seat 2 of the North Carolina Court of Appeals. He faced no opposition in the Democratic primary and is running in the general election against Republican George Cooper Bell, a Mecklenburg County Superior Court judge. An early poll from Democratic-aligned polling firm Public Policy Polling found Bell leading Hampson in the race 43% to 41%. He won reelection.

== Election results ==
North Carolina State Court of Appeals Seat 2 election, 2018
Party	Candidate	Votes	%
Democratic	Tobias Hampson	1,766,470	48.79%
Republican	Jefferson Griffin	1,293,098	35.72%
Republican	Sandra Ray	561,015	15.50%
Total votes		3,620,583	100.0%
Democratic gain from Republican			
