= Allegra Collins =

American jurist (born 1972)

Judge, North Carolina Court of Appeals
- Incumbent
- Assumed office January 1, 2019
- Preceded by: Rick Elmore

Personal details
- Born: Allegra Milholland; January 13, 1972 (age 54)
- Party: Democratic
- Education: College of William & Mary; Norman Adrian Wiggins School of Law (JD); Duke University School of Law (LLM, Judicial Studies)

Allegra Collins (née Milholland; born January 13, 1972) is an American attorney, educator and judge of the North Carolina Court of Appeals.

Collins attended the University of California at Los Angeles before transferring and earning an undergraduate degree from the College of William & Mary in 1994. She represented the United States in the Pan American Games on the United States women's national handball team. She earned her Juris Doctor degree from the Norman Adrian Wiggins School of Law at Campbell University in 2006. She worked as a law clerk to Judge Linda Stephens of the North Carolina Court of Appeals from 2007 to 2010, as an appellate reporter for the North Carolina Supreme Court from 2011 to 2014, and in private practice from 2015 to 2018. She also taught law at the Norman Adrian Wiggins School of Law. In 2023, Judge Collins received her LLM in Judicial Studies from Duke Law School.

In 2018, Collins was narrowly elected as a Democrat to an eight-year term on the North Carolina Court of Appeals (expiring 2026). She took office in January 2019.

Collins announced via social media in 2025 that she would not seek re-election in 2026.

She is married to Wake County Superior Court Judge Bryan Collins.
