= 1998 North Carolina judicial elections =

The North Carolina judicial elections of 1998 were held on 3 November 1998, to elect judges to the North Carolina Supreme Court and North Carolina Court of Appeals.

== Supreme Court ==
=== Webb seat ===
1998 North Carolina Supreme Court election – Webb seat
Party	Candidate	Votes	%
Republican	George Wainwright Jr.	933,692	50.11%
Democratic	James Andrew Wynn (incumbent)	929,761	49.89%
Total votes		1,863,453	100%
Republican gain from Democratic			

=== Whichard seat ===
1998 North Carolina Supreme Court election – Whichard seat
Party	Candidate	Votes	%
Republican	Mark Martin	1,127,779	58.72%
Democratic	Jim Martin	792,908	41.28%
Total votes		1,920,687	100%
Republican gain from Democratic			

== Court of Appeals ==
=== Eagles seat ===
1998 North Carolina Court of Appeals election – Eagles seat
Party	Candidate	Votes	%
Democratic	Sidney Eagles Jr. (incumbent)	968,582	52.75%
Republican	Wendell Schollander	867,471	47.25%
Total votes		1,836,053	100%
Democratic hold			

=== Greene seat ===
1998 North Carolina Court of Appeals election – Greene seat
Party	Candidate	Votes	%
Democratic	K. Edward Greene (incumbent)	970,847	52.96%
Republican	Paul Stam	862,197	47.04%
Total votes		1,833,044	100%
Democratic hold			

=== Horton seat ===
1998 North Carolina Court of Appeals election – Horton seat
Party	Candidate	Votes	%
Republican	Robert Edmunds Jr.	949,110	51.59%
Democratic	Clarence Horton Jr. (incumbent)	890,533	48.41%
Total votes		1,839,643	100%
Republican gain from Democratic			

=== Timmons-Goodson seat ===
1998 North Carolina Court of Appeals election – Timmons-Goodson seat
Party	Candidate	Votes	%
Democratic	Patricia Timmons-Goodson (incumbent)	948,652	51.63%
Republican	Douglas McCullough	888,669	48.37%
Total votes		1,837,321	100%
Democratic hold			

=== Arnold seat ===
1998 North Carolina Court of Appeals election – Arnold seat
Party	Candidate	Votes	%
Democratic	Bob Hunter	914,301	50.10%
Republican	Raymond A. Warren	910,482	49.90%
Total votes		1,824,783	100%
Democratic hold			
