= 2024 United States presidential election in North Carolina =

- November 5, 2024
- Turnout: 73.73% (▼1.62 pp)

Nominee	Donald Trump	Kamala Harris
Party	Republican	Democratic
Home state	Florida	California
Running mate	JD Vance	Tim Walz
Electoral vote	16	0
Popular vote	2,898,423	2,715,375
Percentage	50.86%	47.65%

Trump
40–50%
50–60%
60–70%
70–80%
80–90%
90–100%
Harris
40–50%
50–60%
60–70%
70–80%
80–90%
90–100%
Tie/No data
President before election
Joe Biden
Democratic
Elected President
Donald Trump
Republican

The 2024 United States presidential election in North Carolina took place on Tuesday, November 5, 2024, as part of the 2024 United States presidential election in which all 50 states plus the District of Columbia participated. North Carolina voters chose electors to represent them in the Electoral College via a popular vote. The state of North Carolina has 16 electoral votes in the Electoral College, following reapportionment due to the 2020 United States census in which the state gained a seat.

While Republican presidential candidates won close victories in 2012, 2016, and 2020, even as polls indicated a narrow win by Democrat Joe Biden in 2020, at the state level, Democrat Roy Cooper won the 2016 and 2020 gubernatorial elections. Because of these results, the presidential election was expected to be competitive. Today a purple to slightly red state, North Carolina was targeted by both parties in 2024, with major news organizations marking the state as a tossup or slightly leaning towards the Republican candidate, Donald Trump, who carried the state with a margin similar to his 2016 result. Incumbent president Biden was initially poised to run for re-election but withdrew on July 21 and endorsed his vice president, Kamala Harris.

Despite North Carolina Republicans struggling down-ballot, especially due to controversial Republican gubernatorial nominee Mark Robinson, Trump won the state by 3.21%, keeping it in the Republican column for the fourth election cycle in a row. Trump won the state himself for the third straight election. North Carolina remains the only battleground state that Trump won all three times. With 50.9 percent of the vote, Trump won the highest percentage of the vote for any presidential candidate since 2004.

Harris did outperform Hillary Clinton in 2016, losing by a 3.21% margin compared to Clinton's 3.66% margin of defeat. However, 2024 had less of a 3rd party vote compared to 2016. North Carolina and Georgia were the only two battleground states where Harris did better than Clinton but worse than Biden. They were some of the few states in the country to have many counties shift significantly leftward, particularly counties in the Piedmont Atlantic megaregion.

North Carolina is the only state that Trump won in both 2016 and 2020 that did not vote for him by double digits in 2024. This presidential election marks the first time since 2012 that the winning candidate won the election with an absolute majority of the vote.

== Primary elections ==
=== Democratic primary ===
In North Carolina, candidates can make the primary ballot either by being nominated by the state party or by filing a nominating petition with at least 10,000 signatures. The North Carolina Democratic Party submitted only Joe Biden as a candidate, and no candidate submitted 10,000 signatures by the December 22, 2023, deadline.

The cancellation was criticized by the Dean Phillips campaign, who started an online petition to get his candidacy on the ballot and threatened legal challenges. Marianne Williamson and Cenk Uygur also criticized the moves.

In addition to the candidates on the ballot, the "No Preference" option appeared on the Democratic, Republican, and Libertarian Presidential Preference Primary ballots. In 2012, when President Barack Obama did not face primary opposition in North Carolina, approximately twenty percent of voters opted for the "No Preference" option.

The North Carolina Democratic presidential primary was held on Super Tuesday, March 5, 2024.

2024 North Carolina Democratic pres. primary
Candidate	Votes	%	Delegates
Joe Biden (incumbent)	609,680	87.27	116
No Preference	88,900	12.73	0
Total	698,580	100%	116

=== Republican primary ===
The North Carolina Republican primary was held on Super Tuesday, March 5, 2024.

North Carolina Republican primary, March 5, 2024
Candidate	Votes	Percentage	Actual delegate count		
Candidate	Votes	Percentage	Bound	Unbound	Total
Donald Trump	793,978	73.84%	62		62
Nikki Haley	250,838	23.33%	12		12
Ron DeSantis (withdrawn)	14,740	1.37%			
No Preference	7,448	0.69%			
Vivek Ramaswamy (withdrawn)	3,418	0.32%			
Chris Christie (withdrawn)	3,166	0.29%			
Ryan Binkley (withdrawn)	916	0.09%			
Asa Hutchinson (withdrawn)	727	0.07%			
Total:	1,075,231	100.00%	74		74

=== Libertarian primary ===
2024 North Carolina Libertarian presidential Primary
- March 5, 2024

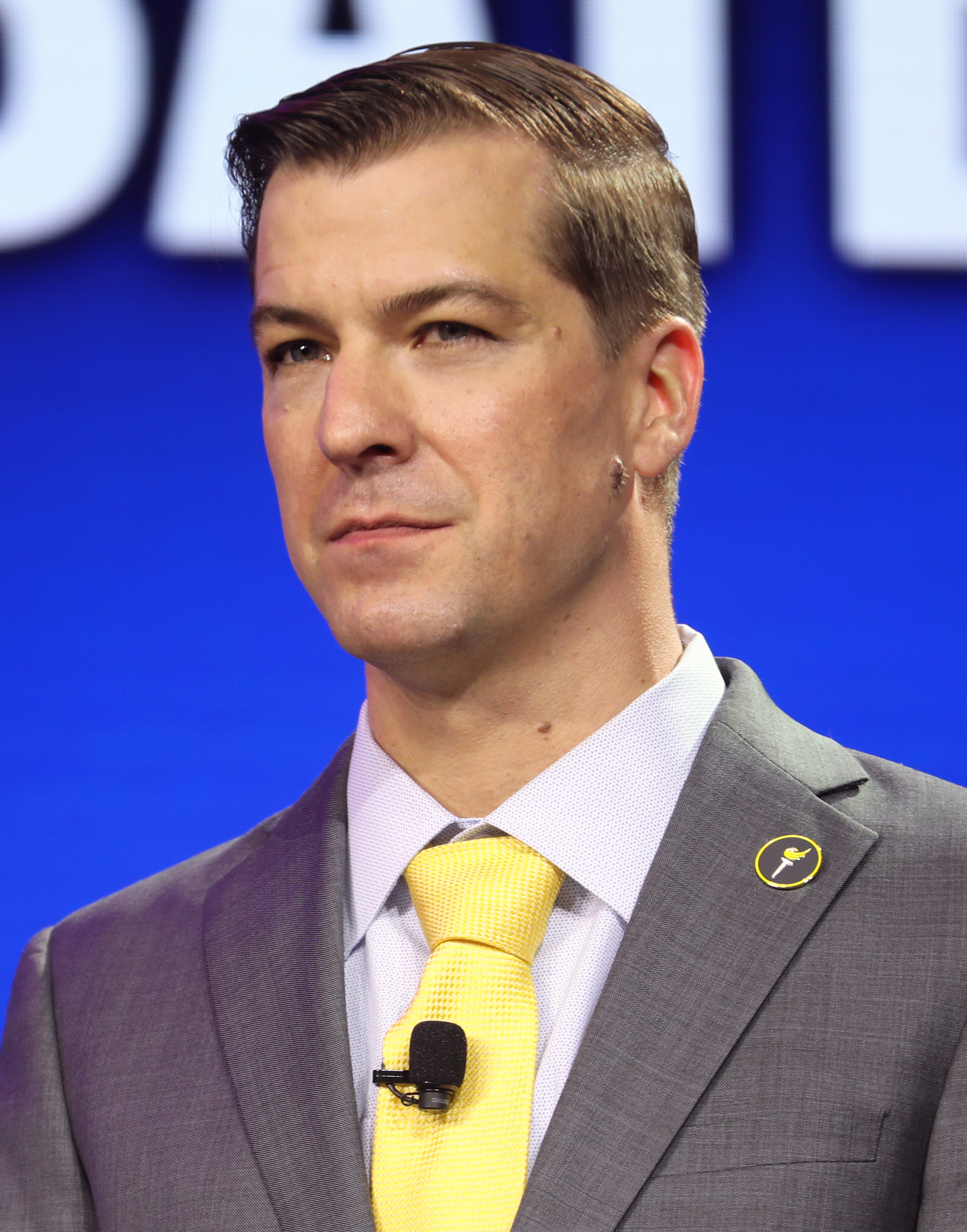

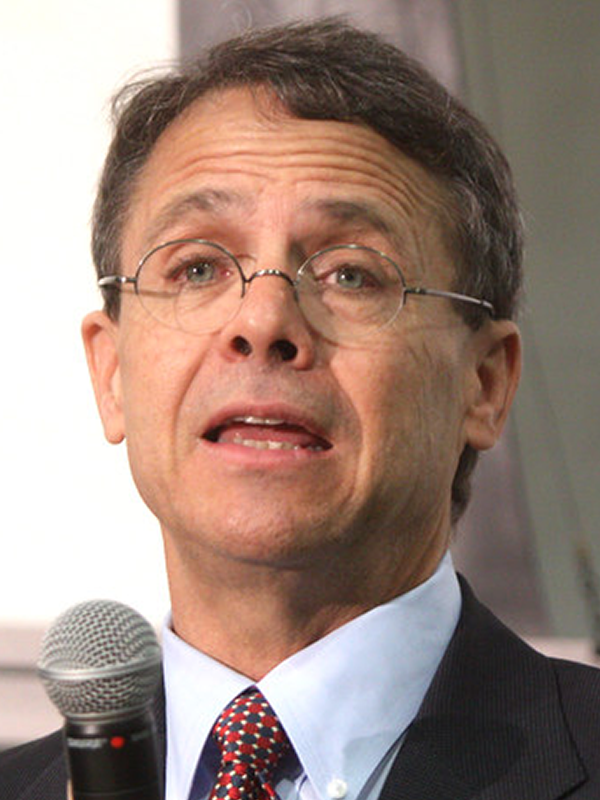

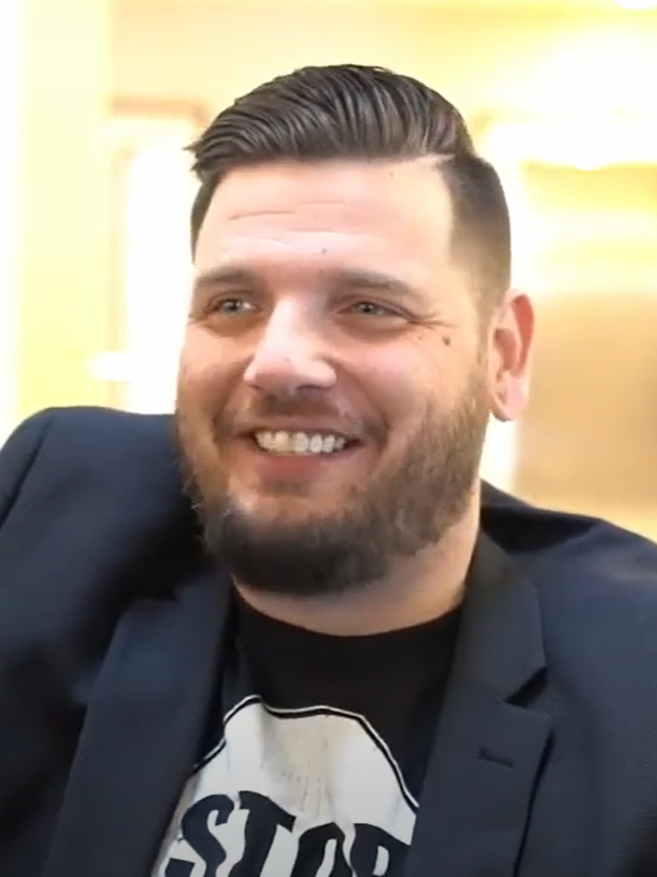
Candidate	None of the above	Chase Oliver
Home state	N/A	Georgia
Percentage	40.5%	13.3%
Candidate	Jacob Hornberger	Joshua Smith
Home state	Virginia	Iowa
Percentage	7.0%	7.0%

The North Carolina Libertarian primary was held on Super Tuesday, March 5, 2024. Ten candidates were presented on the ballot.

North Carolina Libertarian primary, March 5, 2024
Candidate	Votes	Percentage
None of the Above	2,058	40.5%
Chase Oliver	676	13.3%
Jacob Hornberger	357	7.0%
Joshua Smith	354	7.0%
Michael Rectenwald	195	3.8%
Charles Ballay	183	3.6%
Lars Mapstead	176	3.5%
Mike ter Maat	137	2.7%
Other (Note: 464 votes (9.1%) for David (TrimeTaveler) Dunlap, 320 votes (6.3%) for Beau Lindsey, 162 votes (3.2%) for Josh "Toad" Anderson.)	946	18.7%
Total:	5,082	100.0%

== General election ==
=== Events and rule changes ===
Voters must now show a voter ID at the polls and provide a copy of their ID with their mail-in ballots. Mail-in ballots received after election day also will not be counted. There will also be more partisan poll-watchers. The laws are similar to others passed in Republican-controlled states which Democrats have criticized as voter suppression. Common Cause North Carolina and the League of Women Voters of North Carolina have been educating voters on the new rules.

On September 12, 2024, the Republican National Committee sued to block the use of digital IDs, popular with students at the University of North Carolina, as a form of voter ID. The plaintiffs sought a temporary restraining order, and alleged that the digital IDs did not comply with the state's voter identification requirements and were susceptible to fraud. On September 20, 2024, Wake County Superior Court Judge Keith Gregory rejected the request for a temporary restraining order, stating that the Republican National Committee had not "advanced any credible link between the State Board's approval of Mobile One Cards and a heightened risk of ineligible voters casting illegal votes."

Robert F. Kennedy Jr. was granted the status of presidential candidate in July 2024 for North Carolina after state authorities recognized the political party he founded, "We the People," which allowed Kennedy to qualify using 13,757 signatures, instead of the 82,542 signatures required for a candidate with no party. The North Carolina Democratic Party filed a lawsuit alleging that Kennedy was improperly using his party to avoid higher qualification requirements, but this lawsuit against Kennedy was unsuccessful. On August 27, Kennedy asked state authorities to remove him as a presidential candidate in North Carolina; on August 28, the We the People party officially made the same request to state authorities; both requests were initially denied due to ballots already being printed and upcoming deadlines, with North Carolina law mandating that absentee ballots should be mailed by authorities from September 6.

Kennedy responded by launching a lawsuit demanding to be removed as a presidential candidate in North Carolina, with Kennedy previously saying that "by staying on the ballot in the battleground states, I would likely hand the election over to the Democrats", while Kennedy remained as a presidential candidate in non-battleground states and indicated that his lawsuit to become a presidential candidate in New York would continue. While Wake County Superior Court ruled against Kennedy, he appealed and the North Carolina Court of Appeals ruled for Kennedy on September 6, ordering for authorities to reprint ballots without Kennedy as a candidate. The North Carolina Supreme Court affirmed the Court of Appeals' decision on September 9, so authorities went to reprint the ballots, which delayed the mailing date from the originally stipulated September 6 date to become September 20 for military and overseas voters and September 24 for other voters.

=== Predictions ===
Source	Ranking	As of
The Cook Political Report	Tossup	November 4, 2024
Sabato's Crystal Ball	Lean R	November 4, 2024
Decision Desk HQ/The Hill	Tossup	November 4, 2024
CNN	Tossup	November 4, 2024
CNalysis	Tilt D (flip)	November 4, 2024
The Economist	Tossup	November 4, 2024
538	Tossup	November 4, 2024
Inside Elections	Tossup	November 4, 2024
NBC News	Tossup	November 4, 2024

=== Polling ===
Donald Trump vs. Kamala Harris

Aggregate polls

Source of poll aggregation	Dates administered	Dates updated	Kamala Harris Democratic	Donald Trump Republican	Other / Undecided (Note: Calculated by taking the difference of 100% and all other candidates combined.)	Margin
270ToWin	October 23 – November 4, 2024	November 5, 2024	47.3%	48.6%	4.1%	Trump +1.3%
538	through November 4, 2024	November 5, 2024	47.4%	48.3%	4.3%	Trump +0.9%
Silver Bulletin	through November 4, 2024	November 5, 2024	47.7%	48.8%	3.5%	Trump +1.1%
The Hill/DDHQ	through November 4, 2024	November 5, 2024	47.9%	49.4%	2.7%	Trump +1.5%
Average			47.6%	48.8%	3.6%	Trump +1.2%

Poll source	Date(s) administered	Sample size (Note: Key: A – all adults RV – registered voters LV – likely voters V – unclear)	Margin of error	Donald Trump Republican	Kamala Harris Democratic	Other / Undecided
HarrisX	November 3–5, 2024	1,815 (RV)	± 2.3%	48%	47%	5%
HarrisX	November 3–5, 2024	1,815 (RV)	± 2.3%	50.5% (Note: With voters who lean towards a given candidate)	49.5%	–
HarrisX	November 3–5, 2024	1,600 (LV)	± 2.3%	49%	48%	3%
HarrisX	November 3–5, 2024	1,600 (LV)	± 2.3%	50.2%	49.8%	–
AtlasIntel	November 3–4, 2024	1,219 (LV)	± 3.0%	50%	48%	2%
Patriot Polling	November 1–3, 2024	799 (RV)	± 3.0%	51%	49%	–
InsiderAdvantage (R)	November 1–2, 2024	800 (LV)	± 3.4%	49%	47%	4% (Note: "Other" with 2%)
AtlasIntel	November 1–2, 2024	1,310 (LV)	± 3.0%	51%	47%	2%
Emerson College	October 30 – November 2, 2024	860 (LV)	± 3.3%	49%	48%	3% (Note: "Someone else" with 1%)
Emerson College	October 30 – November 2, 2024	860 (LV)	± 3.3%	50%	49%	1%
The New York Times/Siena College	October 28 – November 2, 2024	1,010 (RV)	± 3.5%	44%	48%	8%
The New York Times/Siena College	October 28 – November 2, 2024	1,010 (LV)	± 3.5%	46%	48%	6%
ActiVote	October 17 – November 2, 2024	400 (LV)	± 4.9%	51%	49%	–
Morning Consult	October 23 − November 1, 2024	1,056 (LV)	± 3.0%	49%	47%	4%
AtlasIntel	October 30–31, 2024	1,373 (LV)	± 3.0%	51%	47%	2%
YouGov (Note: Poll conducted for The Times, Stanford University, Arizona State University, and Yale University)	October 25–31, 2024	987 (RV)	± 4.2%	49%	49%	2%
YouGov	October 25–31, 2024	949 (LV)	± 4.2%	50%	49%	1%
Rasmussen Reports (R) (Note: Poll sponsored by American Thinker)	October 25–30, 2024	751 (LV)	± 3.0%	50%	47%	3% (Note: "Other" with 1%)
AtlasIntel	October 25–29, 2024	1,665 (LV)	± 3.0%	48%	49%	3%
Trafalgar Group (R)	October 25–28, 2024	1,091 (LV)	± 2.9%	49%	46%	5%
Fox News	October 24–28, 2024	1,113 (RV)	± 3.0%	49%	50%	1%
Fox News	October 24–28, 2024	872 (LV)	± 3.0%	50%	49%	1%
SurveyUSA (Note: Poll sponsored by WRAL-TV)	October 23–26, 2024	853 (LV)	± 4.1%	47%	47%	6%
CES/YouGov	October 1–25, 2024	2,330 (A)	–	48%	49%	3%
CES/YouGov	October 1–25, 2024	2,308 (LV)	–	50%	48%	2%
Emerson College	October 21–22, 2024	950 (LV)	± 3.1%	50%	48%	2% (Note: "Someone else" with 2%)
Emerson College	October 21–22, 2024	950 (LV)	± 3.1%	50%	48%	2%
Marist College	October 17–22, 2024	1,410 (RV)	± 3.3%	49%	48%	3% (Note: "Another party's candidates" with 2%)
Marist College	October 17–22, 2024	1,226 (LV)	± 3.6%	50%	48%	2% (Note: "Another party's candidates" with 1%)
SoCal Strategies (R) (Note: Poll sponsored by On Point Politics & Red Eagle Politics)	October 20–21, 2024	702 (LV)	± 3.7%	49%	46%	5%
InsiderAdvantage (R)	October 19–20, 2024	800 (LV)	± 3.5%	49%	47%	4%
High Point University/SurveyUSA	October 17–20, 2024	1,164 (RV)	± 3.5%	46%	47%	7%
Bloomberg/Morning Consult	October 16–20, 2024	755 (RV)	± 4.0%	50%	47%	3%
Bloomberg/Morning Consult	October 16–20, 2024	702 (LV)	± 4.0%	50%	48%	2%
AtlasIntel	October 12–17, 2024	1,674 (LV)	± 2.0%	49%	51%	–
Elon University	October 10–17, 2024	800 (RV)	± 4.0%	46%	46%	8% (Note: "Another candidate" with 4%)
Morning Consult	October 6−15, 2024	1,072 (LV)	± 3.0%	49%	48%	3%
The Washington Post/Schar School	September 30 – October 15, 2024	965 (RV)	± 3.9%	49%	45%	6%
The Washington Post/Schar School	September 30 – October 15, 2024	965 (LV)	± 3.9%	50%	47%	3%
Quinnipiac University	October 10–14, 2024	1,031 (LV)	± 3.1%	47%	50%	3%
Rasmussen Reports (R)	October 9–14, 2024	1,042 (LV)	± 3.0%	51%	46%	3%
Trafalgar Group (R)	October 10–13, 2024	1,085 (LV)	± 2.9%	47%	45%	6% (Note: "Other" with 4%)
Fabrizio, Lee & Associates (R)/McLaughlin & Associates (R) (Note: Poll sponsored by Trump's campaign)	October 6–9, 2024	800 (LV)	± 3.5%	48%	47%	5%
Emerson College	October 5–8, 2024	1,000 (LV)	± 3.0%	49%	48%	3%
Emerson College	October 5–8, 2024	1,000 (LV)	± 3.0%	50%	49%	1%
The Wall Street Journal	September 28 – October 8, 2024	600 (RV)	± 5.0%	47%	47%	6%
ActiVote	September 7 – October 6, 2024	400 (LV)	± 4.9%	49%	51%	–
InsiderAdvantage (R)	September 29–30, 2024	800 (LV)	± 3.5%	50%	49%	1%
Quinnipiac University	September 25–29, 2024	953 (LV)	± 3.2%	49%	48%	3%
The Washington Post	September 25–29, 2024	1,001 (RV)	± 3.5%	50%	47%	3%
The Washington Post	September 25–29, 2024	1,001 (LV)	± 3.5%	50%	48%	2%
Global Strategy Group (D)/North Star Opinion Research (R) (Note: Poll sponsored by the Peter G. Peterson Foundation)	September 23–29, 2024	401 (LV)	± 4.9%	48%	47%	5%
High Point University	September 20–29, 2024	814 (RV)	± 3.6%	46%	48%	6%
High Point University	September 20–29, 2024	589 (LV)	± 4.9%	48%	48%	4%
Emerson College (Note: Poll sponsored by RealClearWorld)	September 27–28, 2024	850 (LV)	± 3.3%	49%	48%	3%
Emerson College	September 27–28, 2024	850 (LV)	± 3.3%	50%	49%	1%
RMG Research (Note: Poll sponsored by the Napolitan Institute)	September 25–27, 2024	780 (LV)	± 3.5%	49%	46%	5% (Note: "Some other candidate" with 2%)
RMG Research	September 25–27, 2024	780 (LV)	± 3.5%	51%	47%	2% (Note: "Some other candidate" with 1%)
AtlasIntel	September 20–25, 2024	1,173 (LV)	± 3.0%	48%	51%	1%
Cook Political Report/BSG (R)/GS Strategy Group (D)	September 19–25, 2024	411 (LV)	–	49%	49%	2%
Bloomberg/Morning Consult	September 19–25, 2024	889 (RV)	± 3.0%	47%	50%	3%
Bloomberg/Morning Consult	September 19–25, 2024	828 (LV)	± 3.0%	48%	50%	2%
Fox News	September 20−24, 2024	991 (RV)	± 3.0%	48%	50%	2%
Fox News	September 20−24, 2024	787 (LV)	± 3.5%	50%	49%	1%
Marist College	September 19−24, 2024	1,507 (RV)	± 3.5%	48%	49%	3%
Marist College	September 19−24, 2024	1,348 (LV)	± 3.7%	49%	49%	2%
The Bullfinch Group (Note: Poll conducted for The Independent Center)	September 20–23, 2024	600 (RV)	± 4.0%	48%	49%	3%
Rasmussen Reports (R)	September 19−22, 2024	1,078 (LV)	± 3.0%	49%	46%	5%
The New York Times/Siena College	September 17–21, 2024	682 (RV)	± 4.2%	48%	47%	5%
The New York Times/Siena College	September 17–21, 2024	682 (LV)	± 4.2%	49%	47%	4%
Meredith College	September 18−20, 2024	802 (LV)	± 3.5%	48%	48%	4% (Note: "Third party candidates" & "Undecided" with 2%)
Victory Insights	September 16−18, 2024	600 (LV)	± 4.0%	49%	45%	6%
Emerson College	September 15–18, 2024	1,000 (LV)	± 3.0%	48%	49%	3%
Emerson College	September 15–18, 2024	1,000 (LV)	± 3.0%	49%	50%	1%
Morning Consult	September 9−18, 2024	1,314 (LV)	± 3.0%	47%	49%	4%
Fabrizio Ward (R)/Impact Research (D) (Note: Poll commissioned by AARP)	September 11–17, 2024	600 (LV)	± 4.0%	50%	47%	3%
TIPP Insights (Note: Poll sponsored by American Greatness)	September 11–13, 2024	973 (LV)	± 3.2%	49%	46%	5%
Elon University	September 4−13, 2024	800 (RV)	± 3.8%	45%	46%	9% (Note: "Another candidate" with 3%)
Trafalgar Group (R)	September 11–12, 2024	1,094 (LV)	± 2.9%	48%	46%	6%
Quantus Insights (R) (Note: Poll sponsored by TrendingPolitics)	September 11–12, 2024	815 (LV)	± 3.4%	48%	47%	5% (Note: "Some other candidate" with 3%)
Quantus Insights (R)	September 11–12, 2024	815 (LV)	± 3.4%	50%	48%	2% (Note: "Would not vote" with 2%)
Quinnipiac University	September 4–8, 2024	940 (LV)	± 3.2%	47%	50%	3%
Morning Consult	August 30 – September 8, 2024	1,369 (LV)	± 3.0%	48%	48%	4%
SurveyUSA	September 4–7, 2024	900 (LV)	± 4.9%	46%	49%	5%
Mainstreet Research/Florida Atlantic University	September 5–6, 2024	692 (RV)	± 3.7%	47%	46%	7%
Mainstreet Research/Florida Atlantic University	September 5–6, 2024	619 (LV)	± 3.7%	48%	47%	5% (Note: "Another candidate" with 2%)
Patriot Polling	September 1–3, 2024	804 (RV)	–	50%	48%	2%
InsiderAdvantage (R)	August 29–31, 2024	800 (LV)	± 3.5%	49%	48%	3%
ActiVote	August 6–31, 2024	400 (LV)	± 4.9%	50%	50%	–
Emerson College	August 25–28, 2024	775 (LV)	± 3.5%	49%	48%	3%
Emerson College	August 25–28, 2024	775 (LV)	± 3.5%	50%	49%	1%
SoCal Strategies (R)	August 26–27, 2024	612 (LV)	–	50%	46%	4%
Bloomberg/Morning Consult	August 23–26, 2024	645 (LV)	± 4.0%	49%	49%	2%
Bloomberg/Morning Consult	August 23–26, 2024	700 (RV)	± 4.0%	47%	49%	4%
Fox News	August 23–26, 2024	999 (RV)	± 3.0%	50%	49%	1%
	August 23, 2024	Robert F. Kennedy Jr. suspends his presidential campaign and endorses Donald Trump.				
	August 22, 2024	Democratic National Convention concludes				
High Point University/SurveyUSA	August 19–21, 2024	1,053 (RV)	± 4.0%	45%	46%	9%
High Point University/SurveyUSA	August 19–21, 2024	941 (LV)	± 4.0%	47%	47%	6%
Spry Strategies (R) (Note: Poll sponsored by the American Principles Project)	August 14–20, 2024	600 (LV)	± 4.0%	47%	47%	6%
	August 19, 2024	Democratic National Convention begins				
Focaldata	August 6–16, 2024	702 (LV)	± 3.7%	50%	50%	–
The New York Times/Siena College	August 9–14, 2024	655 (RV)	± 4.2%	46%	49%	5%
The New York Times/Siena College	August 9–14, 2024	655 (LV)	± 4.2%	47%	49%	4%
Trafalgar Group (R)	August 6–8, 2024	1,082 (LV)	± 2.9%	49%	45%	6%
Navigator Research (D)	July 31 – August 8, 2024	600 (LV)	± 4.0%	48%	46%	6%
Cook Political Report/BSG (R)/GS Strategy Group (D)	July 26 – August 8, 2024	403 (LV)	–	47%	48%	5%
	August 6, 2024	Kamala Harris selects Gov. Tim Walz as her running mate.				
Bloomberg/Morning Consult	July 24–28, 2024	706 (RV)	± 4.0%	48%	46%	6%
	July 21, 2024	Joe Biden announces his official withdrawal from the race; Kamala Harris declares her candidacy for president.				
	July 15–19, 2024	Republican National Convention				
	July 13, 2024	Attempted assassination of Donald Trump				
Bloomberg/Morning Consult	May 7–13, 2024	704 (RV)	± 4.0%	50%	40%	10%
Emerson College	February 14–16, 2024	1,000 (RV)	± 3.0%	50%	41%	9%

Donald Trump vs. Kamala Harris vs. Cornel West vs. Jill Stein vs. Chase Oliver

Aggregate polls

Source of poll aggregation	Dates administered	Dates updated	Kamala Harris Democratic	Donald Trump Republican	Jill Stein Green	Cornel West Independent	Chase Oliver Libertarian	Others/ Undecided (Note: Calculated by taking the difference of 100% and all other candidates combined.)	Margin
Race to the WH	through October 2, 2024	October 15, 2024	47.1%	47.8%	1.0%	0.8%	—N/a	3.3%	Trump +0.8%
270toWin	October 1 – 11, 2024	October 11, 2024	46.6%	47.0%	0.8%	1.0%	0.5%	4.1%	Trump +0.4%
Average			47.0%	47.5%	0.8%	0.8%	0.6%	3.3%	Trump +0.5%

Poll source	Date(s) administered	Sample size	Margin of error	Donald Trump Republican	Kamala Harris Democratic	Cornel West Independent	Jill Stein Green	Chase Oliver Libertarian	Other / Undecided
HarrisX	November 3–5, 2024	1,815 (RV)	± 2.3%	48%	46%	1%	1%	–	4%
HarrisX	November 3–5, 2024	1,815 (RV)	± 2.3%	49.0%	48.5%	1.6%	0.9%	–	–
HarrisX	November 3–5, 2024	1,600 (LV)	± 2.3%	49%	48%	1%	0%	–	2%
HarrisX	November 3–5, 2024	1,600 (LV)	± 2.3%	49.2%	49.0%	1.2%	0.6%	–	–
AtlasIntel	November 3–4, 2024	1,219 (LV)	± 3.0%	50%	48%	–	1%	0%	1%
AtlasIntel	November 1–2, 2024	1,310 (LV)	± 3.0%	50%	47%	–	1%	0%	2%
The New York Times/Siena College	October 28 – November 2, 2024	1,010 (RV)	± 3.5%	43%	47%	0%	0%	1%	9%
The New York Times/Siena College	October 28 – November 2, 2024	1,010 (LV)	± 3.5%	45%	48%	0%	0%	0%	7%
Focaldata	October 3 – November 1, 2024	1,787 (LV)	–	48%	48%	–	1%	1%	2%
Focaldata	October 3 – November 1, 2024	1,785 (RV)	± 2.2%	46%	50%	–	1%	1%	2%
Focaldata	October 3 – November 1, 2024	1,987 (A)	–	46%	48%	–	2%	1%	4%
AtlasIntel	October 30–31, 2024	1,373 (LV)	± 3.0%	51%	47%	–	1%	0%	1%
Redfield & Wilton Strategies	October 28–31, 2024	1,123 (LV)	–	48%	47%	–	1%	1%	3%
YouGov	October 25–31, 2024	987 (RV)	± 4.2%	48%	47%	0%	1%	–	4%
YouGov	October 25–31, 2024	949 (LV)	± 4.2%	49%	48%	0%	1%	–	2%
AtlasIntel	October 25–29, 2024	1,665 (LV)	± 3.0%	48%	48%	–	1%	0%	3%
East Carolina University	October 24–29, 2024	1,250 (LV)	± 3.0%	50%	48%	0%	0%	0%	2%
CNN/SSRS	October 23–28, 2024	750 (LV)	± 4.5%	47%	48%	1%	1%	1%	2%
Redfield & Wilton Strategies	October 25–27, 2024	770 (LV)	–	48%	46%	–	1%	1%	4%
University of Massachusetts Lowell/YouGov	October 16–23, 2024	650 (LV)	± 4.2%	47%	45%	1%	1%	0%	6% (Note: Randall Terry (C) with 0%)
Redfield & Wilton Strategies	October 20–22, 2024	679 (LV)	–	48%	47%	–	1%	0%	4%
Bloomberg/Morning Consult	October 16–20, 2024	755 (RV)	± 4.0%	49%	46%	–	1%	3%	1%
Bloomberg/Morning Consult	October 16–20, 2024	702 (LV)	± 4.0%	49%	48%	–	1%	1%	1%
Redfield & Wilton Strategies	October 16–18, 2024	843 (LV)	–	48%	45%	–	1%	0%	6%
AtlasIntel	October 12–17, 2024	1,674 (LV)	± 2.0%	49%	50%	0%	1%	0%	–
Cygnal (R) (Note: Poll sponsored by The Carolina Journal)	October 6–15, 2024	600 (LV)	± 4.0%	47%	47%	1%	0%	1%	4%
Redfield & Wilton Strategies	October 12–14, 2024	620 (LV)	–	48%	46%	–	0%	1%	5%
Quinnipiac University	October 10–14, 2024	1,031 (LV)	± 3.1%	47%	49%	0%	0%	1%	3%
Redfield & Wilton Strategies	September 27 – October 2, 2024	753 (LV)	–	47%	45%	–	1%	0%	7%
Quinnipiac University	September 25–29, 2024	953 (LV)	± 3.2%	49%	47%	1%	1%	0%	2%
East Carolina University	September 23–26, 2024	1,005 (LV)	± 3.0%	49%	47%	0%	0%	1%	3%
AtlasIntel	September 20–25, 2024	1,173 (LV)	± 3.0%	47%	51%	1%	1%	0%	–
CNN/SSRS	September 20–25, 2024	931 (LV)	± 3.9%	48%	48%	1%	0%	1%	2%
Cook Political Report/BSG (R)/GS Strategy Group (D)	September 19–25, 2024	411 (LV)	–	46%	49%	1%	2%	–	2%
Bloomberg/Morning Consult	September 19–25, 2024	889 (RV)	± 3.0%	46%	48%	–	1%	3%	2%
Bloomberg/Morning Consult	September 19–25, 2024	828 (LV)	± 3.0%	47%	49%	–	0%	2%	2%
Fox News	September 20−24, 2024	991 (RV)	± 3.0%	47%	48%	1%	1%	1%	2%
Fox News	September 20−24, 2024	787 (LV)	± 3.5%	49%	47%	1%	1%	1%	1%
The New York Times/Siena College	September 17–21, 2024	682 (RV)	± 4.2%	46%	46%	–	0%	1%	7%
The New York Times/Siena College	September 17–21, 2024	682 (LV)	± 4.2%	47%	45%	–	0%	1%	7%
Meredith College	September 18–20, 2024	802 (LV)	± 3.5%	48%	48%	0%	1%	1%	2%
Redfield & Wilton Strategies	September 16–19, 2024	868 (LV)	–	48%	47%	–	0%	0%	5%
Fabrizio Ward (R)/Impact Research (D)	September 11–17, 2024	600 (LV)	± 4.0%	48%	46%	1%	1%	1%	3%
Cygnal (R)	September 15–16, 2024	600 (LV)	± 4.0%	46%	45%	2%	0%	1%	6%
Redfield & Wilton Strategies	September 6–9, 2024	495 (LV)	–	44%	45%	–	0%	0%	11%
Quinnipiac University	September 4–8, 2024	940 (LV)	± 3.2%	46%	49%	0%	1%	0%	4%
YouGov	August 23 – September 3, 2024	1,000 (RV)	± 3.9%	47%	46%	0%	1%	–	6%
East Carolina University	August 26–28, 2024	920 (LV)	± 3.0%	48%	47%	0%	0%	1%	4%
Redfield & Wilton Strategies	August 25–28, 2024	1,071 (LV)	–	45%	44%	–	1%	1%	9%
Bloomberg/Morning Consult	August 23–26, 2024	700 (RV)	± 4.0%	47%	48%	–	1%	2%	2%
Bloomberg/Morning Consult	August 23–26, 2024	645 (LV)	± 4.0%	48%	48%	–	1%	2%	1%
Fox News	August 23–26, 2024	999 (RV)	± 3.0%	48%	47%	2%	1%	1%	1%

Hypothetical polling with Robert F. Kennedy Jr.

Donald Trump vs. Kamala Harris vs. Robert F. Kennedy Jr. vs. Cornel West vs. Jill Stein vs. Chase Oliver

Poll source	Date(s) administered	Sample size	Margin of error	Donald Trump Republican	Kamala Harris Democratic	Robert F. Kennedy Jr Independent	Cornel West Independent	Jill Stein Green	Chase Oliver Libertarian	Other / Undecided
Fox News	October 24–28, 2024	1,113 (RV)	± 3.0%	47%	48%	1%	1%	1%	1%	1%
Fox News	October 24–28, 2024	872 (LV)	± 3.0%	49%	47%	1%	1%	1%	1%	–
The Wall Street Journal	September 28 – October 8, 2024	600 (RV)	± 5.0%	46%	45%	0%	1%	1%	2%	5%
Global Strategy Group (D)/North Star Opinion Research (R)	September 23–29, 2024	401 (LV)	± 4.9%	47%	47%	0%	0%	0%	0%	6%
Spry Strategies (R)	August 14–20, 2024	600 (LV)	± 4.0%	45%	47%	3%	–	1%	–	4%
Focaldata	August 6–16, 2024	702 (LV)	± 3.7%	46%	47%	5%	–	1%	0%	1%
Focaldata	August 6–16, 2024	702 (RV)	± 3.7%	44%	47%	6%	–	1%	0%	2%
Focaldata	August 6–16, 2024	702 (A)	± 3.7%	43%	47%	7%	–	1%	0%	2%
Redfield & Wilton Strategies	August 12–15, 2024	601 (LV)	–	47%	44%	2%	–	0%	1%	6%
The New York Times/Siena College	August 9–14, 2024	655 (RV)	± 4.2%	42%	45%	5%	0%	2%	1%	4%
The New York Times/Siena College	August 9–14, 2024	655 (LV)	± 4.2%	44%	46%	4%	0%	1%	1%	4%
YouGov Blue (D) (Note: Poll sponsored by Carolina Forward)	August 5–9, 2024	802 (RV)	± 3.9%	46%	46%	2%	0%	0%	0%	5%
Navigator Research (D)	July 31 – August 8, 2024	600 (LV)	± 4.0%	46%	46%	3%	0%	1%	0%	4%
Cook Political Report/BSG (R)/GS Strategy Group (D)	July 26 – August 8, 2024	403 (LV)	–	44%	46%	4%	0%	1%	–	5%
Cygnal (R)	August 4–5, 2024	600 (LV)	± 4.0%	47%	44%	4%	–	0%	1%	4%
Redfield & Wilton Strategies	July 31 – August 3, 2024	714 (LV)	–	44%	41%	4%	–	0%	1%	10%
Bloomberg/Morning Consult	July 24–28, 2024	706 (RV)	± 4.0%	45%	44%	5%	–	0%	4%	2%
Redfield & Wilton Strategies	July 22–24, 2024	586 (LV)	–	46%	43%	4%	–	0%	0%	7%

Donald Trump vs. Kamala Harris vs. Robert F. Kennedy Jr. vs. Jill Stein

Poll source	Date(s) administered	Sample size	Margin of error	Donald Trump Republican	Kamala Harris Democratic	Robert F. Kennedy Jr. Independent	Jill Stein Green	Other / Undecided
Public Policy Polling (D) (Note: Poll conducted for Clean and Prosperous America PAC)	July 17–20, 2024	573 (RV)	± 4.1%	48%	44%	2%	2%	4%

Hypothetical polling with Donald Trump and Joe Biden

Donald Trump vs. Joe Biden

Poll source	Date(s) administered	Sample size	Margin of error	Donald Trump Republican	Joe Biden Democratic	Other / Undecided
Quantus Insights (R)	September 11–12, 2024	815 (LV)	± 3.4%	49%	42%	9%
Public Policy Polling (D)	July 17–20, 2024	573 (RV)	± 4.1%	50%	46%	4%
Emerson College (Note: Poll sponsored by Democrats for the Next Generation PAC)	July 15–16, 2024	1,000 (RV)	± 3.0%	48%	41%	11%
Echelon Insights (Note: Poll sponsored by NetChoice)	July 1–8, 2024	610 (LV)	± 5.0%	47%	45%	8%
Bloomberg/Morning Consult	July 1–5, 2024	696 (RV)	± 4.0%	46%	43%	11%
Spry Strategies (R)	June 7–11, 2024	600 (LV)	± 4.0%	48%	44%	8%
East Carolina University	May 31 – June 3, 2024	1,332 (LV)	± 3.1%	48%	43%	9%
North Star Opinion Research (R)	May 29 – June 2, 2024	600 (LV)	± 4.0%	49%	41%	10%
Rasmussen Reports (R) (Note: Poll sponsored by NumbersUSA)	May 26–27, 2024	1,053 (LV)	± 3.0%	51%	43%	6%
Change Research (D) (Note: Poll sponsored by Carolina Forward)	May 13–18, 2024	835 (LV)	± 3.8%	45%	43%	12%
Prime Group (Note: Poll sponsored by Citizens to Save Our Republic PAC, which opposes Trump and third party candidates)	May 9–16, 2024	472 (RV)	–	51%	49%	–
Bloomberg/Morning Consult	May 7–13, 2024	704 (RV)	± 4.0%	49%	42%	9%
Cook Political Report/BSG (R)/GS Strategy Group (D)	May 6–13, 2024	601 (LV)	± 4.0%	48%	41%	11%
High Point University	May 5–9, 2024	804 (RV)	± 3.2%	44%	42%	14%
Emerson College	April 25–29, 2024	1,000 (RV)	± 3.0%	47%	42%	11%
Emerson College	April 25–29, 2024	1,000 (RV)	± 3.0%	52%	48%	–
John Zogby Strategies (Note: Poll conducted for Kennedy's campaign)	April 13–21, 2024	641 (LV)	–	49%	45%	6%
Bloomberg/Morning Consult	April 8–15, 2024	703 (RV)	± 4.0%	51%	41%	8%
Mason-Dixon	April 9–13, 2024	635 (RV)	± 4.0%	49%	43%	8%
Quinnipiac University	April 4–8, 2024	1,401 (RV)	± 2.6%	48%	46%	6%
High Point University	March 22–30, 2024	829(RV)	± 3.4%	45%	42%	14%
The Wall Street Journal	March 17–24, 2024	600 (RV)	± 4.0%	49%	43%	8%
Marist College	March 11–14, 2024	1,197 (RV)	± 3.6%	51%	48%	1%
Bloomberg/Morning Consult	March 8–12, 2024	699 (RV)	± 4.0%	49%	43%	8%
SurveyUSA	March 3–9, 2024	598 (LV)	± 4.9%	50%	45%	5%
Cygnal (R) (Note: Poll sponsored by the John Locke Foundation)	March 6–7, 2024	600 (LV)	± 4.0%	45%	40%	15%
Bloomberg/Morning Consult	February 12–20, 2024	704 (RV)	± 5.0%	50%	41%	9%
Emerson College	February 14–16, 2024	1,000 (RV)	± 3.0%	47%	44%	9%
Fox News	February 8–12, 2024	1,099 (RV)	± 3.0%	50%	45%	5%
Meredith College	January 26–31, 2024	760 (RV)	± 3.5%	44%	39%	17%
Bloomberg/Morning Consult	January 16–21, 2024	706 (RV)	± 4.0%	49%	39%	12%
Bloomberg/Morning Consult	November 27 – December 6, 2023	704 (RV)	± 4.0%	49%	40%	11%
Bloomberg/Morning Consult	October 30 – November 7, 2023	702 (RV)	± 4.0%	48%	39%	13%
Meredith College	November 1–5, 2023	755 (RV)	± 3.5%	39%	40%	22% (Note: "Someone else" with 17%)
Bloomberg/Morning Consult	October 5–10, 2023	702 (RV)	± 4.0%	47%	43%	10%
Redfield & Wilton Strategies	October 7–9, 2023	736 (LV)	–	43%	38%	20%
Change Research (D)	September 1–5, 2023	914 (LV)	± 3.6%	46%	42%	12%
Prime Group	June 14–28, 2023	500 (RV)	–	54%	46%	–
Prime Group	June 14–28, 2023	500 (RV)	–	45%	37%	18% (Note: No Labels candidate)
Opinion Diagnostics	June 5–7, 2023	902 (LV)	± 3.3%	43%	40%	18%
Cygnal (R)	March 26–27, 2023	605 (LV)	± 4.0%	43%	45%	12%
Differentiators (R) (Note: Poll sponsored by NC Values Coalition, a sponsor of the Republican Party)	January 9–12, 2023	500 (LV)	± 4.5%	45%	48%	7%
Emerson College	October 27–29, 2022	1,000 (LV)	± 3.0%	51%	40%	9%
Public Policy Polling (D)	October 7–8, 2022	606 (RV)	–	44%	44%	12%
SurveyUSA	September 28 – October 2, 2022	918 (RV)	± 3.9%	43%	45%	12%
Emerson College	September 15–16, 2022	1,000 (LV)	± 3.0%	47%	42%	11%
East Carolina University	September 7–10, 2022	1,020 (LV)	± 3.6%	46%	45%	9%
Blueprint Polling (D)	August 4–6, 2022	656 (LV)	± 3.8%	45%	39%	17%
PEM Management Corporation (R) (Note: Poll conducted for the John Bolton Super PAC)	July 22–24, 2022	300 (LV)	± 5.7%	48%	41%	11%
East Carolina University	May 19–20, 2022	635 (RV)	± 4.5%	46%	37%	16%

Donald Trump vs. Joe Biden vs. Robert F. Kennedy Jr. vs. Cornel West vs. Jill Stein

Poll source	Date(s) administered	Sample size	Margin of error	Donald Trump Republican	Joe Biden Democratic	Robert Kennedy Jr Independent	Cornel West Independent	Jill Stein Green	Other / Undecided
Public Policy Polling (D)	July 17–20, 2024	573 (RV)	± 4.1%	48%	42%	2%	–	2%	6%
Redfield & Wilton Strategies	July 16–18, 2024	461 (LV)	–	45%	39%	5%	–	1%	10% (Note: Chase Oliver (L) with 1%)
Emerson College	July 15–16, 2024	1,000 (RV)	± 3.0%	47%	38%	6%	1%	1%	7%
YouGov	July 4–12, 2024	1,000 (RV)	± 3.7%	44%	40%	4%	0%	1%	11%
Redfield & Wilton Strategies	July 8–10, 2024	420 (LV)	–	44%	42%	4%	–	1%	9% (Note: Chase Oliver (L) with 0%)
Echelon Insights	July 1–8, 2024	610 (LV)	± 5.0%	43%	41%	7%	2%	1%	6%
Bloomberg/Morning Consult	July 1–5, 2024	696 (RV)	± 4.0%	42%	40%	7%	1%	1%	9%
Redfield & Wilton Strategies	June 8–11, 2024	534 (LV)	–	43%	40%	7%	–	1%	9%
North Star Opinion Research (R)	May 29 – June 2, 2024	600 (LV)	± 4.0%	44%	32%	9%	3%	2%	10%
Prime Group	May 9–16, 2024	472 (RV)	–	45%	42%	11%	2%	1%	–
Bloomberg/Morning Consult	May 7–13, 2024	704 (RV)	± 4.0%	46%	38%	7%	1%	1%	7%
Cook Political Report/BSG (R)/GS Strategy Group (D)	May 6–13, 2024	601 (LV)	± 4.0%	44%	36%	8%	3%	1%	8%
Emerson College	April 25–29, 2024	1,000 (RV)	± 3.0%	46%	37%	6%	1%	1%	9%
Meeting Street Insights (R) (Note: Poll sponsored by Carolina Partnership for Reform & Carolina Leadership Coalition)	April 25–28, 2024	500 (RV)	± 4.4%	40%	35%	11%	–	2%	12% (Note: Charles Ballay (L) with 2%)
Bloomberg/Morning Consult	April 8–15, 2024	703 (RV)	± 4.0%	48%	38%	5%	1%	0%	8%
Quinnipiac University	April 4–8, 2024	1,401 (RV)	± 2.6%	41%	38%	12%	3%	3%	3%
The Wall Street Journal	March 17–24, 2024	600 (RV)	± 4.0%	42%	34%	10%	2%	1%	11%
Bloomberg/Morning Consult	March 8–12, 2024	699 (RV)	± 4.0%	45%	39%	7%	1%	0%	8%
Bloomberg/Morning Consult	February 12–20, 2024	704 (RV)	± 5.0%	45%	35%	9%	1%	1%	9%
Emerson College	February 14–16, 2024	1,000 (RV)	± 3.0%	46%	37%	5%	1%	1%	10%
East Carolina University	February 9–12, 2024	1,207 (LV)	± 3.3%	47%	44%	2%	1%	1%	5%
Fox News	February 8–12, 2024	1,099 (RV)	± 3.0%	46%	37%	8%	1%	2%	6%
Bloomberg/Morning Consult	January 16–21, 2024	706 (RV)	± 4.0%	45%	32%	9%	1%	1%	12%
Bloomberg/Morning Consult	November 27 – December 6, 2023	704 (RV)	± 4.0%	45%	34%	8%	1%	1%	11%

Donald Trump vs. Joe Biden vs. Robert F. Kennedy Jr.

Poll source	Date(s) administered	Sample size	Margin of error	Donald Trump Republican	Joe Biden Democratic	Robert Kennedy Jr Independent	Other / Undecided
Spry Strategies (R)	June 7–11, 2024	600 (LV)	± 4.0%	45%	37%	8%	10%
Change Research (D)	May 13–18, 2024	835 (LV)	± 3.8%	41%	38%	11%	10%
Cygnal (R)	May 4–5, 2024	600 (LV)	± 4.0%	43%	38%	9%	10%
Redfield & Wilton Strategies	May 2–4, 2024	700 (LV)	–	44%	37%	7%	12%
Meredith College	April 11–17, 2024	711 (LV)	± 3.5%	41%	39%	9%	11%
Cygnal (R)	April 7–8, 2024	600 (LV)	± 4.0%	43%	39%	7%	11%
Redfield & Wilton Strategies	March 14–17, 2024	642 (LV)	–	43%	39%	8%	10%
Marist College	March 11–14, 2024	1,197 (RV)	± 3.6%	46%	43%	11%	–
North Star Opinion Research (R) (Note: Poll sponsored by the League of American Workers)	January 30 – February 4, 2024	600 (LV)	± 4.0%	39%	32%	16%	13%
Redfield & Wilton Strategies	December 28–30, 2023	1,220 (LV)	–	37%	33%	11%	19%
Redfield & Wilton Strategies	November 27–29, 2023	620 (LV)	–	44%	35%	8%	13%
Redfield & Wilton Strategies	October 7–9, 2023	736 (LV)	–	41%	38%	9%	14%

Donald Trump vs. Joe Biden vs. Robert F. Kennedy Jr. vs. Cornel West

Poll source	Date(s) administered	Sample size	Margin of error	Donald Trump Republican	Joe Biden Democratic	Robert F. Kennedy Jr. Independent	Cornel West Independent	Other / Undecided
Bloomberg/Morning Consult	October 30 – November 7, 2023	702 (RV)	± 4.0%	42%	33%	9%	2%	14%

Hypothetical polling with other candidates

Donald Trump vs. Robert F. Kennedy Jr.

Poll source	Date(s) administered	Sample size	Margin of error	Donald Trump Republican	Robert F. Kennedy Jr. Independent	Other / Undecided
John Zogby Strategies	April 13–21, 2024	641 (LV)	–	45%	39%	16%

Robert F. Kennedy Jr. vs. Joe Biden

Poll source	Date(s) administered	Sample size	Margin of error	Robert F. Kennedy Jr. Independent	Joe Biden Democratic	Other / Undecided
John Zogby Strategies	April 13–21, 2024	641 (LV)	–	50%	40%	10%

Donald Trump vs. Roy Cooper vs. Robert F. Kennedy Jr. vs. Jill Stein

Poll source	Date(s) administered	Sample size	Margin of error	Donald Trump Republican	Roy Cooper Democratic	Robert Kennedy Jr Independent	Jill Stein Green	Other / Undecided
Public Policy Polling (D)	July 17–20, 2024	573 (RV)	± 4.1%	45%	41%	3%	2%	9%

Donald Trump vs. Gavin Newsom

Poll source	Date(s) administered	Sample size	Margin of error	Donald Trump Republican	Gavin Newsom Democratic	Other / Undecided
Emerson College	February 14–16, 2024	1,000 (RV)	± 3.0%	49%	34%	17%

Nikki Haley vs. Joe Biden

Poll source	Date(s) administered	Sample size	Margin of error	Nikki Haley Republican	Joe Biden Democratic	Other / Undecided
Fox News	February 8–12, 2024	1,099 (RV)	± 3.0%	46%	41%	13%

Nikki Haley vs. Joe Biden vs. Robert F. Kennedy Jr. vs. Cornel West vs. Jill Stein

Poll source	Date(s) administered	Sample size	Margin of error	Nikki Haley Republican	Joe Biden Democratic	Robert F. Kennedy Jr Independent	Cornel West Independent	Jill Stein Green	Other / Undecided
East Carolina University	February 9–12, 2024	1,207 (LV)	± 3.3%	32%	40%	10%	2%	0%	16%
Fox News	February 8–12, 2024	1,099 (RV)	± 3.0%	31%	33%	19%	2%	2%	13%

Nikki Haley vs. Joe Biden vs. Robert F. Kennedy Jr.

Poll source	Date(s) administered	Sample size	Margin of error	Nikki Haley Republican	Joe Biden Democratic	Robert F. Kennedy Jr Independent	Other / Undecided
Redfield & Wilton Strategies	November 27–29, 2023	620 (LV)	–	36%	33%	12%	18%

Ron DeSantis vs. Joe Biden

Poll source	Date(s) administered	Sample size	Margin of error	Ron DeSantis Republican	Joe Biden Democratic	Other / Undecided
Opinion Diagnostics	June 5–7, 2023	902 (LV)	± 3.3%	46%	40%	13%
Cygnal (R)	March 26–27, 2023	605 (LV)	± 4.0%	44%	41%	15%
Differentiators (R)	January 9–12, 2023	500 (LV)	± 4.5%	49%	44%	7%

Ron DeSantis vs. Joe Biden vs. Robert F. Kennedy Jr.

Poll source	Date(s) administered	Sample size	Margin of error	Ron DeSantis Republican	Joe Biden Democratic	Robert F. Kennedy Jr. Independent	Other	Undecided
Redfield & Wilton Strategies	November 27–29, 2023	620 (LV)	–	38%	34%	12%	4%	12%

Mike Pence vs. Joe Biden

Poll source	Date(s) administered	Sample size	Margin of error	Mike Pence Republican	Joe Biden Democratic	Other / Undecided
Cygnal (R)	March 26–27, 2023	605 (LV)	± 4.0%	39%	41%	20%

=== Results ===
State House district results: Trump 40–50% 50–60% 60–70% 70–80% / Harris 40–50% 50–60% 60–70% 70–80% 80–90%

2024 United States presidential election in North Carolina
Party	Candidate	Votes	%	±%
Republican	Donald Trump; JD Vance	2,898,423	50.86%	+0.93%
Democratic	Kamala Harris; Tim Walz	2,715,375	47.65%	−0.94%
Green	Jill Stein; Butch Ware	24,762	0.43%	+0.21%
Libertarian	Chase Oliver; Mike ter Maat	22,125	0.39%	−0.49%
Justice for All	Cornel West; Melina Abdullah	12,099	0.21%	+0.21%
Constitution	Randall Terry; Stephen Broden	6,863	0.12%	−0.02%
Write-in		19,494	0.33%	+0.09%
Total votes		5,699,141	100.00%	N/A

==== By county ====
County	Donald Trump Republican		Kamala Harris Democratic		Various candidates Other parties		Margin		Total
County	#	%	#	%	#	%	#	%	Total
Alamance	47,937	53.36%	40,624	45.22%	1,270	1.41%	7,313	8.14%	89,831
Alexander	16,404	79.33%	4,060	19.64%	213	1.03%	12,344	59.69%	20,677
Alleghany	4,900	75.43%	1,533	23.60%	63	0.97%	3,367	51.83%	6,496
Anson	5,525	50.80%	5,253	48.30%	97	0.89%	272	2.50%	10,875
Ashe	11,629	71.55%	4,431	27.26%	193	1.19%	7,198	44.29%	16,253
Avery	7,181	75.68%	2,220	23.40%	88	0.93%	4,961	52.28%	9,489
Beaufort	17,296	65.09%	9,049	34.05%	227	0.85%	8,247	31.04%	26,572
Bertie	3,840	41.80%	5,279	57.47%	67	0.73%	-1,439	-15.67%	9,186
Bladen	10,035	59.86%	6,620	39.49%	109	0.65%	3,415	20.37%	16,764
Brunswick	67,658	61.86%	40,557	37.08%	1,163	1.06%	27,101	24.78%	109,378
Buncombe	59,016	36.77%	98,662	61.47%	2,832	1.76%	-39,646	-24.70%	160,510
Burke	32,130	70.08%	13,272	28.95%	445	0.97%	18,858	41.13%	45,847
Cabarrus	63,746	53.03%	54,494	45.34%	1,962	1.63%	9,252	7.69%	120,202
Caldwell	33,009	75.81%	10,146	23.30%	385	0.88%	22,863	52.51%	43,540
Camden	4,716	74.81%	1,522	24.14%	66	1.05%	3,194	50.67%	6,304
Carteret	32,508	70.95%	12,813	27.97%	496	1.08%	19,695	42.98%	45,817
Caswell	7,445	61.84%	4,493	37.32%	102	0.85%	2,952	24.52%	12,040
Catawba	59,577	68.39%	26,569	30.50%	963	1.11%	33,008	37.89%	87,109
Chatham	22,507	43.03%	29,014	55.48%	780	1.49%	-6,507	-12.45%	52,301
Cherokee	13,883	77.89%	3,686	20.68%	255	1.43%	10,197	57.21%	17,824
Chowan	4,587	60.74%	2,895	38.33%	70	0.93%	1,692	22.41%	7,552
Clay	5,761	74.55%	1,899	24.57%	68	0.88%	3,862	49.98%	7,728
Cleveland	34,654	67.02%	16,603	32.11%	449	0.87%	18,051	34.91%	51,706
Columbus	17,592	66.63%	8,648	32.76%	162	0.61%	8,944	33.87%	26,402
Craven	33,477	59.60%	22,011	39.18%	685	1.22%	11,466	20.42%	56,173
Cumberland	59,840	42.59%	78,631	55.96%	2,042	1.45%	-18,791	-13.37%	140,513
Currituck	13,235	73.31%	4,604	25.50%	214	1.19%	8,631	47.81%	18,053
Dare	14,792	58.71%	10,074	39.98%	330	1.31%	4,718	18.73%	25,196
Davidson	67,959	72.72%	24,150	25.84%	1,343	1.44%	43,809	46.88%	93,452
Davie	19,398	72.25%	6,988	26.03%	464	1.73%	12,410	46.22%	26,850
Duplin	14,677	64.10%	8,057	35.19%	164	0.72%	6,620	28.91%	22,898
Durham	32,853	18.16%	144,450	79.85%	3,609	1.99%	-111,597	-61.69%	180,912
Edgecombe	9,355	38.26%	14,900	60.95%	193	0.79%	-5,545	-22.69%	24,448
Forsyth	87,292	42.64%	114,145	55.76%	3,289	1.61%	-26,853	-13.12%	204,726
Franklin	23,938	56.10%	18,167	42.58%	562	1.32%	5,771	13.52%	42,667
Gaston	73,828	61.91%	44,062	36.95%	1,366	1.15%	29,766	24.96%	119,256
Gates	3,538	60.29%	2,268	38.65%	62	1.06%	1,270	21.64%	5,868
Graham	3,883	81.25%	839	17.56%	57	1.19%	3,044	63.69%	4,779
Granville	17,383	54.15%	14,365	44.75%	356	1.11%	3,018	9.40%	32,104
Greene	4,965	58.76%	3,437	40.67%	48	0.57%	1,528	18.09%	8,450
Guilford	109,077	38.27%	171,118	60.03%	4,858	1.70%	-62,041	-21.76%	285,053
Halifax	9,778	40.80%	14,014	58.48%	173	0.72%	-4,236	-17.68%	23,965
Harnett	39,440	61.86%	23,472	36.81%	845	1.33%	15,968	25.05%	63,757
Haywood	23,393	61.80%	13,913	36.76%	545	1.44%	9,480	25.04%	37,851
Henderson	39,497	56.45%	29,361	41.96%	1,116	1.59%	10,136	14.49%	69,974
Hertford	3,561	36.18%	6,191	62.90%	91	0.92%	-2,630	-26.72%	9,843
Hoke	10,547	46.33%	11,896	52.25%	324	1.42%	-1,349	-5.92%	22,767
Hyde	1,465	60.51%	931	38.46%	25	1.03%	534	22.05%	2,421
Iredell	72,801	65.66%	36,739	33.14%	1,335	1.20%	36,062	32.52%	110,875
Jackson	11,796	53.76%	9,746	44.42%	400	1.82%	2,050	9.34%	21,942
Johnston	74,878	60.06%	48,116	38.59%	1,684	1.35%	26,762	21.47%	124,678
Jones	3,409	62.40%	2,007	36.74%	47	0.86%	1,402	25.66%	5,463
Lee	17,489	58.14%	12,245	40.71%	347	1.15%	5,244	17.43%	30,081
Lenoir	14,564	52.95%	12,700	46.18%	239	0.87%	1,864	6.77%	27,503
Lincoln	40,183	72.29%	14,842	26.70%	557	1.00%	25,341	45.59%	55,582
Macon	14,981	68.30%	6,675	30.43%	278	1.27%	8,306	37.87%	21,934
Madison	8,275	60.75%	5,090	37.37%	256	1.88%	3,185	23.38%	13,621
Martin	6,601	54.83%	5,360	44.52%	79	0.66%	1,241	10.31%	12,040
McDowell	17,520	74.06%	5,911	24.99%	224	0.95%	11,609	49.07%	23,655
Mecklenburg	187,770	32.51%	376,454	65.19%	13,281	2.30%	-188,684	-32.68%	577,505
Mitchell	6,843	77.39%	1,915	21.66%	84	0.95%	4,928	55.73%	8,842
Montgomery	9,044	68.48%	4,055	30.71%	107	0.81%	4,989	37.77%	13,206
Moore	39,617	64.12%	21,436	34.69%	737	1.19%	18,181	29.43%	61,790
Nash	26,431	50.37%	25,508	48.61%	532	1.01%	923	1.76%	52,471
New Hanover	67,949	48.98%	68,814	49.60%	1,971	1.42%	-865	-0.62%	138,734
Northampton	3,905	42.38%	5,239	56.85%	71	0.77%	-1,334	-14.47%	9,215
Onslow	54,960	67.29%	25,684	31.44%	1,037	1.27%	29,276	35.85%	81,681
Orange	20,806	23.70%	65,444	74.53%	1,557	1.77%	-44,638	-50.83%	87,807
Pamlico	5,229	65.56%	2,676	33.55%	71	0.89%	2,553	32.01%	7,976
Pasquotank	10,537	51.80%	9,549	46.94%	257	1.26%	988	4.86%	20,343
Pender	26,042	66.93%	12,460	32.02%	407	1.05%	13,582	34.91%	38,909
Perquimans	5,278	68.85%	2,269	29.60%	119	1.55%	3,009	39.25%	7,666
Person	13,509	61.30%	8,295	37.64%	232	1.05%	5,214	23.66%	22,036
Pitt	40,403	46.37%	45,595	52.33%	1,132	1.30%	-5,192	-5.96%	87,130
Polk	8,107	62.04%	4,827	36.94%	134	1.03%	3,280	25.10%	13,068
Randolph	59,357	78.09%	15,951	20.99%	700	0.92%	43,406	57.10%	76,008
Richmond	11,931	60.04%	7,787	39.18%	155	0.78%	4,144	20.86%	19,873
Robeson	29,647	63.39%	16,728	35.77%	395	0.84%	12,919	27.62%	46,770
Rockingham	33,447	67.44%	15,676	31.61%	472	0.95%	17,771	35.83%	49,595
Rowan	50,807	67.39%	23,788	31.55%	799	1.06%	27,019	35.84%	75,394
Rutherford	25,456	73.42%	8,914	25.71%	300	0.87%	16,542	47.71%	34,670
Sampson	18,178	64.46%	9,797	34.74%	226	0.80%	8,381	29.72%	28,201
Scotland	7,767	53.10%	6,754	46.18%	105	0.72%	1,013	6.92%	14,626
Stanly	27,518	74.95%	8,881	24.19%	315	0.86%	18,637	50.76%	36,714
Stokes	21,548	79.29%	5,380	19.80%	247	0.91%	16,168	59.49%	27,175
Surry	28,565	76.16%	8,613	22.96%	330	0.88%	19,952	53.20%	37,508
Swain	4,311	61.13%	2,643	37.48%	98	1.39%	1,668	23.65%	7,052
Transylvania	11,492	55.30%	8,972	43.18%	316	1.52%	2,520	12.12%	20,780
Tyrrell	1,057	60.16%	680	38.70%	20	1.14%	377	21.46%	1,757
Union	86,271	61.91%	51,168	36.72%	1,916	1.37%	35,103	25.19%	139,355
Vance	8,614	42.87%	11,292	56.20%	186	0.93%	-2,678	-13.33%	20,092
Wake	236,735	36.22%	402,984	61.66%	13,861	2.12%	-166,249	-25.44%	653,580
Warren	3,976	39.71%	5,872	58.64%	165	1.65%	-1,896	-18.93%	10,013
Washington	2,768	46.57%	3,138	52.79%	38	0.64%	-370	-6.22%	5,944
Watauga	15,254	46.09%	17,225	52.05%	616	1.86%	-1,971	-5.96%	33,095
Wayne	31,580	57.67%	22,618	41.30%	564	1.03%	8,962	16.37%	54,762
Wilkes	28,812	79.33%	7,194	19.81%	314	0.86%	21,618	59.52%	36,320
Wilson	19,750	49.32%	19,909	49.72%	386	0.96%	-159	-0.40%	40,045
Yadkin	16,439	80.60%	3,739	18.33%	219	1.07%	12,700	62.27%	20,397
Yancey	7,509	66.55%	3,635	32.22%	139	1.23%	3,874	34.33%	11,283
Totals	2,898,423	50.86%	2,715,375	47.65%	85,343	1.49%	183,048	3.21%	5,699,141

==== Counties that flipped from Democratic to Republican ====
- Anson (largest municipality: Wadesboro)
- Nash (largest municipality: Rocky Mount)
- Pasquotank (largest municipality: Elizabeth City)

==== By congressional district ====
Trump won 11 of 14 congressional districts, including one that elected a Democrat.

District	Trump	Harris	Representative
1st	51.08%	47.93%	Don Davis
2nd	32.11%	65.79%	Deborah Ross
3rd	60.33%	38.51%	Greg Murphy
4th	26.42%	71.51%	Valerie Foushee
5th	58.20%	40.51%	Virginia Foxx
6th	57.71%	40.68%	Addison McDowell
7th	56.34%	42.48%	David Rouzer
8th	58.97%	39.63%	Mark Harris
9th	57.25%	41.43%	Richard Hudson
10th	58.17%	40.52%	Pat Harrigan
11th	53.96%	44.49%	Chuck Edwards
12th	25.82%	71.68%	Alma Adams
13th	57.53%	41.06%	Brad Knott
14th	56.83%	41.82%	Tim Moore

== Analysis ==
Georgia and North Carolina were among the few states in the country to have many counties swing leftward in 2024.

Although a Southern Bible Belt state, North Carolina has been competitive since the late 2000s – a trend primarily attributed to urban population growth – as the state has been narrowly decided in every presidential election by less than a 4% margin since 2008, when Barack Obama very narrowly carried the state and became the only Democratic presidential candidate to do so since Jimmy Carter of neighboring Georgia in 1976. However, Republicans have won every single federal statewide race in North Carolina since 2010. It flipped back into the GOP column in 2012 and has been narrowly won by Republican nominee Donald Trump in the past two cycles.

Trump's margin of victory was more than double that of his 2020 margin, though it was slightly less than his 2016 margin. The state had one of the smallest swings in the nation from 2020 to 2024, shifting rightward by 1.9%, smaller than all other swing states except Wisconsin (which swung by 1.5%). North Carolina was one of only six states where Harris received more raw votes than Biden in 2020. (Note: The other five states were Georgia, Maine, Nevada, Utah, and Wisconsin.) This marked the fifth consecutive election where North Carolina was decided by less than 5%, the longest ongoing such streak out of any state. Trump became the first Republican to win the White House without carrying New Hanover County since Dwight D. Eisenhower in 1956. This is the first time since 2008 that the state voted for the winner of the national popular vote. Anson County voted Republican for the first time since 1972 and Pasquotank County since 1988. North Carolina was among 23 states where Harris posted a better margin than Hillary Clinton in 2016. (Note: The other states were Alaska, Oregon, Washington, Montana, Wyoming, Colorado, South Dakota, Minnesota, Nebraska, Kansas, Oklahoma, Missouri, Indiana, Georgia, Virginia, West Virginia, Maryland, Delaware, Connecticut, Maine, Vermont, and New Hampshire.)

Potentially due to the effects of Hurricane Helene, Western North Carolina was one of the few areas of the country to swing towards the Democrats between 2020 and 2024, along with counties in Georgia in the Piedmont Atlantic megaregion. Despite around 90% of American counties shifting toward Trump during this time period, ten counties in the region bucked this trend and supported Harris to a greater extent than Joe Biden. (Note: These were Ashe, Avery, Buncombe, Haywood, Henderson, Macon, Madison, Mitchell, Polk and Transylvania.)

Although Harris lost the state, down-ballot statewide North Carolina Democrats concurrently outperformed her, partly due to state Attorney General Josh Stein winning the gubernatorial election in a landslide against controversial Lieutenant Governor Mark Robinson.

=== Exit poll data ===
2024 presidential election in North Carolina voter demographics
Demographic subgroup	Trump	Harris	% of total vote
Ideology
Liberals	4	95	21
Moderates	38	60	40
Conservatives	90	9	39
Party
Democrats	3	96	32
Republicans	96	3	34
Independents	51	47	35
Gender
Men	57	41	47
Women	45	54	53
Race/ethnicity
White	62	37	69
Black	12	86	19
Latino	50	49	8
Asian	n/a	n/a	2
All other races	n/a	n/a	2
Gender by race/ethnicity
White men	66	32	34
White women	58	41	36
Black men	20	79	8
Black women	8	92	11
Latino men	62	37	4
Latina women	38	60	4
All other races	49	48	4
White born-again or evangelical Christian?
Yes	87	12	31
No	34	64	69
Age
18–29 years old	48	51	14
30–44 years old	45	53	22
45–64 years old	53	45	38
65 and older	54	45	25
First time voter
Yes	60	38	9
No	51	48	91
2020 presidential vote
Biden	4	95	43
Trump	97	3	44
Another candidate	n/a	n/a	2
Did not vote	56	42	10
Education
No college degree	57	41	59
College graduate	41	57	41
Educational attainment
Never attended college	61	38	16
Some college	52	47	25
Associate degree	62	36	17
Bachelor's degree	45	53	25
Advanced degree	36	62	16
Education by race
White college graduates	47	51	31
White no college degree	75	24	38
Non-white college graduates	25	72	10
Non-white no college degree	26	72	20
Education by gender among White voters
White college graduate women	43	56	16
White women no degree	70	29	20
White college graduate men	52	46	15
White men no degree	78	21	19
Voters of color	26	72	31
Area type
Urban	32	67	28
Suburban	57	41	53
Rural	61	38	20
Biden job approval
Strongly disapprove	96	3	48
Somewhat disapprove	33	62	9
Somewhat approve	7	91	23
Strongly approve	2	98	18
Feeling about the way things are going in U.S.
Angry	78	21	28
Dissatisfied	60	39	44
Satisfied	9	90	20
Enthusiastic	7	91	6
Quality of candidate that mattered most
Has ability to lead	69	31	33
Can bring needed change	69	29	27
Has good judgment	14	81	17
Cares about people like me	29	70	21
Vote for president mainly
For your candidate	53	46	78
Against their opponent	41	56	19
Issue regarded as most important
Democracy	14	85	31
Economy	76	23	37
Abortion	23	75	12
Immigration	93	6	13
Foreign policy	n/a	n/a	4
Democracy threatened in the United States
Democracy in the U.S. very threatened	59	40	38
Democracy in the U.S. somewhat threatened	47	51	35
Democracy in the U.S. somewhat secure	43	56	17
Democracy in the U.S. very secure	34	66	7
Confident election being conducted fairly and accurately
Very confident	22	77	42
Somewhat confident	63	36	38
Not very confident	87	12	12
Not at all confident	n/a	n/a	5
Condition of the nation's economy
Poor	90	9	34
Not so good	55	42	35
Good	5	95	27
Excellent	n/a	n/a	4
Family's financial situation today
Worse than four years ago	84	15	48
About the same	27	71	28
Better than four years ago	12	86	23
Abortion should be
Legal in all cases	15	84	29
Legal in most cases	43	53	31
Illegal in most cases	92	8	27
Illegal in all cases	79	20	9
Who do you trust more to handle racial issues?
Harris	6	91	52
Trump	99	1	45

== See also ==
- 2024 North Carolina elections
- United States presidential elections in North Carolina
- 2024 United States presidential election
- 2024 Democratic Party presidential primaries
- 2024 Republican Party presidential primaries
- 2024 United States elections

== Notes ==
Partisan clients
