= Robert C. Hunter =

American politician and Judge from North Carolina

Judge of the North Carolina Court of Appeals
- In office July 8, 1998 – January 1, 2015
- Appointed by: Jim Hunt
- Preceded by: Gerald Arnold
- Succeeded by: Lucy Inman

Member of the North Carolina House of Representatives
- In office January 1, 1981 – July 7, 1998
- Preceded by: Glenn Morris
- Succeeded by: Annette Bryant
- Constituency: 41st District (1981–1983); 49th District (1983–1998)

Personal details
- Born: Robert Carl Hunter; January 14, 1944 (age 82) Marion, North Carolina
- Party: Democratic
- Children: 2
- Education: University of North Carolina at Chapel Hill (BA); University of North Carolina School of Law (JD)

Robert Carl "Bob" Hunter (born January 14, 1944) is an American jurist, who served as a Judge of the North Carolina Court of Appeals from 1998 through 2014.

Hunter, born in Marion, North Carolina, earned a degree in political science from the University of North Carolina at Chapel Hill in 1966 before earning his Juris Doctor degree from the same institution in 1969. While at UNC-Chapel Hill, he became a brother of Alpha Phi Omega. After earning his degree, Hunter worked as a county attorney in McDowell County, North Carolina. He also represented the 49th District in the North Carolina House of Representatives from 1980 to 1998. Significant legislation passed during his tenure included the Highway Trust Fund, NC Victims' Bill of Rights, NC Victims' Compensation Fund, and the establishment of Lake James State Park.

In 1998, Hunter was appointed by Gov. Jim Hunt to the state Court of Appeals, and he was elected to an eight-year term on the court that same year. In 2006, Hunter won the plurality of votes in the state's non-partisan primary on May 2, thus advancing to the November general election. Winning 99 of 100 counties, he defeated Kris Bailey in that election to win another eight-year term. He announced in 2013 that he would retire at the end of his term rather than seek re-election in 2014. During his tenure on the Court of Appeals, Hunter decided over 4,000 appellate cases and authored over 1,500 opinions.

Hunter has been active in community and nonprofit organizations. He is a board member of both the N.C. Healthy Start Foundation and Southmountain Children's Services, and he is a member of the Rotary Club of Raleigh, McDowell Economic Development Association, and the McDowell Chamber of Commerce.

Hunter ran for the North Carolina Supreme Court in 2002 and in 2010, losing to Bob Orr and to Barbara Jackson, respectively.

He is married and has two children.

== Electoral history ==
=== 2010 ===
North Carolina Supreme Court Associate Justice (Seat 1) general election, 2010
Party	Candidate	Votes	%
Nonpartisan	Barbara Jackson	1,043,850	51.86%
Nonpartisan	Bob Hunter	969,019	48.14%
Total votes		2,012,869	100%

=== 2006 ===
North Carolina Court of Appeals Judge (Seat 8) primary election, 2006
Party	Candidate	Votes	%
Nonpartisan	Bob Hunter (incumbent)	301,309	60.31%
Nonpartisan	Kris Bailey	119,150	23.85%
Nonpartisan	Bill Constangy	79,109	15.84%
Total votes		499,568	100%

North Carolina Court of Appeals Judge (Seat 8) general election, 2006
Party	Candidate	Votes	%
Nonpartisan	Bob Hunter (incumbent)	903,691	58.06%
Nonpartisan	Kris Bailey	652,733	41.94%
Total votes		1,556,424	100%

=== 2002 ===
North Carolina Supreme Court Associate Justice (Seat 2) Democratic primary election, 2002
Party	Candidate	Votes	%
Democratic	Bob Hunter	351,350	71.90%
Democratic	Bradley K. Greenway	137,304	28.10%
Total votes		488,654	100%

North Carolina Supreme Court Associate Justice (Seat 2) general election, 2002
Party	Candidate	Votes	%
Republican	Bob Orr (incumbent)	1,189,751	54.65%
Democratic	Bob Hunter	987,447	45.35%
Total votes		2,177,198	100%
Republican hold			

=== 1998 ===
North Carolina Court of Appeals Judge (Seat 8) general election, 1998
Party	Candidate	Votes	%
Democratic	Bob Hunter	914,301	50.10%
Republican	Raymond A. Warren	910,482	49.90%
Total votes		1,824,783	100%
Democratic hold			

== See also ==
- Robert N. Hunter Jr., a similarly named fellow judge of the Court of Appeals

North Carolina House of Representatives
Preceded by Glenn Morris	Member of the North Carolina House of Representatives from the 41st district 1981–1983	Succeeded by John Walter Brown; George Holmes
Preceded by Constituency established	Member of the North Carolina House of Representatives from the 49th district 1983–1998	Succeeded by Annette Bryant
