= Martha A. Geer =

American judge

Martha A. Geer is an American attorney and jurist who served as a judge of the North Carolina Court of Appeals.

Geer was born in Grinnell, Iowa and spent most of her childhood in Virginia, where her parents were teachers. Geer attended Bryn Mawr College and earned a degree in sociology before earning a Juris Doctor (J.D.) degree from the University of North Carolina at Chapel Hill in 1983. At UNC, she was the Managing Editor of the North Carolina Law Review.

Geer worked in the area of corporate law in New York City and North Carolina from 1986 to 2002, when she was elected to an eight-year term on the North Carolina Court of Appeals as a Democrat. She was re-elected in 2010.

On March 16, 2016, Judge Geer announced her intent to resign from the bench in mid-May, 2016, to join the firm of Cohen Milstein.
