= Valerie Zachary =

North Carolina attorney (born 1962)

Judge of the North Carolina Court of Appeals
- Incumbent
- Assumed office July 31, 2015
- Appointed by: Pat McCrory
- Preceded by: Sanford Steelman Jr.

Personal details
- Born: Valerie Johnson; 1962 (age 63–64)
- Party: Republican
- Spouse: Lee Zachary (m. 1989)
- Education: Michigan State University (BA); Harvard University (JD)

Valerie Johnson Zachary is a North Carolina attorney who is currently a judge on the North Carolina Court of Appeals.

== Career ==
Zachary is a graduate of Harvard Law School. She practiced law in Yadkinville, North Carolina for many years in a firm along with her husband, Lee Zachary. In July 2015, Zachary was appointed to the North Carolina Court of Appeals by North Carolina Governor Pat McCrory to fill a vacancy. In the 2016 statewide general election, Zachary was elected to the North Carolina Court of Appeals for an eight-year term. She was re-elected in the 2024 general election.

The North Carolina Advocates for Justice honored Zachary with the "Outstanding Appellate Judge" award in 2019.

== Electoral history ==
=== 2024 ===
North Carolina Court of Appeals (Seat 14) election, 2024
| Party | Candidate | Votes | % |
|---|---|---|---|
| Republican | Valerie Zachary (incumbent) | 2,879,049 | 52.28% |
| Democratic | Ed Eldred | 2,628,453 | 47.72% |
| Total votes | | 5,723,987 | 100% |

=== 2016 ===
North Carolina State Court of Appeals (Zachary Seat) election, 2016
| Party | Candidate | Votes | % |
|---|---|---|---|
| Republican | Valerie Zachary (incumbent) | 2,361,232 | 53.81% |
| Democratic | Rickye McKoy-Mitchell | 2,027,078 | 46.19% |
| Total votes | | 4,388,310 | 100% |
| Republican hold | | | |

Legal offices
| Preceded by Sanford Steelman Jr. | Judge of the North Carolina Court of Appeals; 2015–Present | Incumbent |
