= Sanford L. Steelman Jr. =

American judge

Sanford Steelman Jr.
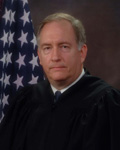

Judge of the North Carolina Court of Appeals
- In office January 1, 2003 – June 30, 2015
- Preceded by: Loretta Copeland Biggs
- Succeeded by: Valerie Zachary

Personal details
- Born: September 11, 1951 (age 74)
- Party: Republican
- Children: 3
- Education: Davidson College; University of East Anglia; University of North Carolina at Chapel Hill (JD)
- Profession: Judge

Sanford L. Steelman Jr. (born September 11, 1951) is an American judge, who served on the North Carolina Court of Appeals from January 2003 until his retirement in June 2015.

Steelman attended Davidson College, graduating with a degree in political science in 1973 and having spent a year abroad at the University of East Anglia. He then completed his Juris Doctor degree at the University of North Carolina at Chapel Hill in 1976. He worked in private practice in Monroe, North Carolina until 1994, when he became a North Carolina Superior Court judge. In 2002, Steelman was elected to an eight-year term on the North Carolina Court of Appeals as a Republican, and in 2010, he was re-elected without opposition.

He is married and has three sons.

== Electoral history ==
=== 2010 ===
North Court of Appeals (Steelman seat) general election, 2010
| Party | Candidate | Votes | % |
|---|---|---|---|
| Nonpartisan | Sanford Steelman Jr. (incumbent) | 1,404,649 | 100% |
| Total votes | | 1,404,649 | 100% |

=== 2002 ===
North Court of Appeals (Biggs seat) general election, 2002
| Party | Candidate | Votes | % |
|---|---|---|---|
| Republican | Sanford Steelman Jr. | 1,083,194 | 50.86% |
| Democratic | Loretta Copeland Biggs (incumbent) | 1,046,689 | 49.14% |
| Total votes | | 2,129,883 | 100% |
| Republican gain from Democratic | | | |

Legal offices
| Preceded by Loretta Copeland Biggs | Judge of the North Carolina Court of Appeals; 2003–2015 | Succeeded by Valerie Zachary |
