= Naomi E. Morris =

American judge (1921–1986)

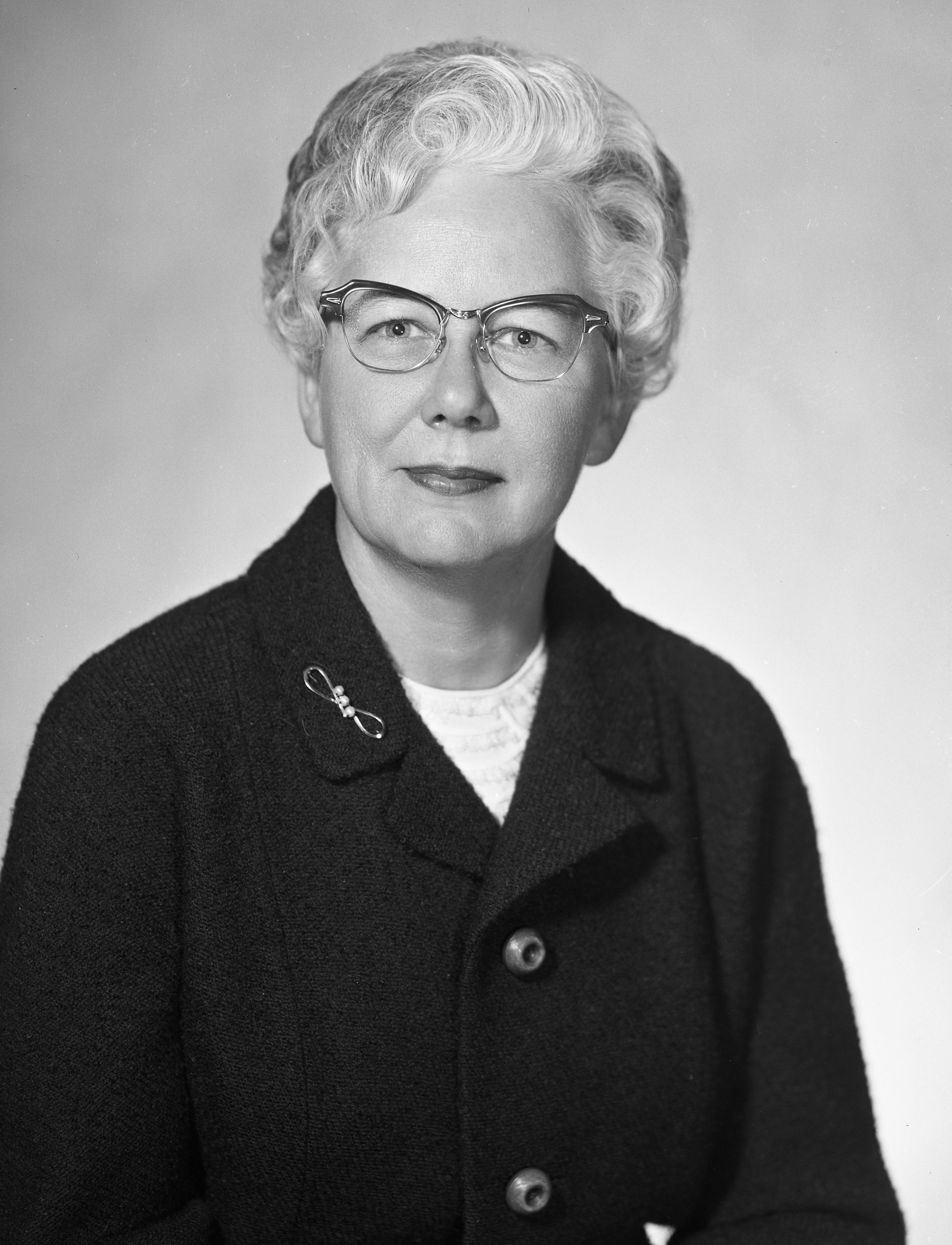
- Morris in 1968

Chief Judge of the North Carolina Court of Appeals
- In office 1978–1982

Associate Judge of the North Carolina Court of Appeals
- In office 1967–1978

Personal details
- Born: Naomi Elizabeth Morris; December 1, 1921 Spring Hope, North Carolina, U.S.
- Died: 1986 (aged 64–65)
- Parent(s): Edward Eugene Morris; Blanche Beatrix Boyce Morris
- Education: Atlantic Christian College; University of North Carolina School of Law
- Profession: Judge

Naomi Elizabeth Morris (1921–1986) was a North Carolina jurist who served on the North Carolina Court of Appeals from 1967 through 1982. She was Chief Judge of that court from 1978 through 1982, the second woman to hold that post.

== Early life and education ==
Naomi Morris was born on 1 December 1921 in Spring Hope, North Carolina to Edward Eugene and Blanche Beatrix Boyce Morris.

Morris graduated from Atlantic Christian College (today Barton College) and the University of North Carolina School of Law where she was fourth in her class. In 1987, the Judge Naomi E. Morris Memorial Scholarship was established at the UNC School of Law.

== Career ==
During World War II, Morris worked for the U.S. Army Signal Corps in Washington, D.C. She had previously worked as a secretary in a law firm.

After graduating university, she joined a law firm in Wilson, North Carolina where she returned to after her retirement in December 1982. She was appointed judge of the North Carolina Court of Appeals in 1967. Morris was elected to a full term in 1968 and re-elected in 1974. In January 1979, she was appointed chief judge of the Court of Appeals.
