= Ann Marie Calabria =

American jurist

Judge of the North Carolina Court of Appeals
- In office January 1, 2003 – December 31, 2018
- Preceded by: Wanda Bryant
- Succeeded by: Toby Hampson

Personal details
- Born: October 31, 1947 (age 77); Bryn Mawr, Pennsylvania, U.S.
- Political party: Republican
- Education: Fairleigh Dickinson University (BA); Norman Adrian Wiggins School of Law (JD)
- Occupation: Judge; lawyer

Ann Marie Calabria (born October 31, 1947) is an American jurist who served as a judge on the North Carolina Court of Appeals until her retirement on December 31, 2018.

Born in Bryn Mawr, Pennsylvania, Calabria studied at Fairleigh Dickinson University, where she earned a B.A., then at Campbell University's Norman Adrian Wiggins School of Law, where she earned a J.D. in 1983. After spending about a decade in private sole practice as well as a brief stint with the United States Department of Housing and Urban Development, Calabria became a Wake County District Court judge in 1996, and won election to the North Carolina Court of Appeals in 2002 as a Republican. She is married and has three children.

Judge Calabria was an unsuccessful candidate for the North Carolina Supreme Court in 2006.
