= 2010 North Carolina elections =

- November 2, 2010

Elections were held in North Carolina on Tuesday, November 2, 2010. Primary elections took place on May 4, 2010.

== Federal ==
=== United States Senate ===
Incumbent Republican Richard Burr won re-election against a crowded field.

=== United States House ===
All 13 seats in the United States House of Representatives were up for election in 2010. All thirteen incumbents sought re-election.

== State ==
Statewide offices in North Carolina, including Governor, Lieutenant Governor, Secretary of State, Attorney General, Treasurer, and Auditor, were not up for election in 2010.

=== State Senate ===
All 50 seats in the North Carolina Senate were up for election in 2010.

=== State House of Representatives ===
All 120 seats in the North Carolina House of Representatives were up for election in 2010.

=== Judicial positions ===
At least one North Carolina Supreme Court seat and four North Carolina Court of Appeals seats were up for election in 2010. Vacancies on either court that occurred before the election may increased the number of seats on the ballot.

=== Ballot measures ===
At least one statewide ballot measure was on the November 2 ballot:

- Prohibit convicted felons from running for sheriff in the state

== Local ==
Many elections for county offices were also held on November 2, 2010.
