= Hugh Brown Campbell Jr. =

American judge and politician

Member of the North Carolina House of Representatives
- In office 1969–1972

Judge of the North Carolina Court of Appeals
- In office January 10, 2001 – December 31, 2002
- Appointed by: Jim Hunt
- Preceded by: Seat established
- Succeeded by: Eric Levinson

Personal details
- Born: February 19, 1937 Charlotte, North Carolina, U.S.
- Died: September 11, 2015 (aged 78)
- Party: Democratic
- Education: Davidson College; Harvard Law School
- Occupation: Judge

Hugh Brown Campbell Jr. (February 19, 1937 – September 11, 2015) was an American judge and politician who served as a member of the North Carolina House of Representatives.

== Biography ==
Campbell was born in Charlotte, North Carolina. He attended Davidson College and Harvard Law School.

Campbell served in the North Carolina House of Representatives from 1969 to 1972.

Campbell was an associate judge of the North Carolina Court of Appeals from 2000 to 2002.

Campbell died on September 11, 2015, at the age of 78.
