= Edward Thomas Brady =

American judge

Edward Brady

Associate Justice of the North Carolina Supreme Court
- In office January 1, 2003 – January 1, 2011
- Preceded by: G. K. Butterfield
- Succeeded by: Barbara Jackson

Personal details
- Born: Edward Thomas Brady; November 1, 1943 (age 82) Brooklyn, New York, U.S.
- Party: Republican
- Education: University of Nebraska at Omaha (BS); John Jay College of Criminal Justice (MS); California Western School of Law (JD)

Military service
- Branch/service: United States Army
- Years of service: 1963–1993
- Battles/wars: Vietnam War

Edward Thomas Brady (born November 1, 1943) is an American trial attorney and former associate justice of the North Carolina Supreme Court. He was elected in November 2002 as a Republican, defeating incumbent G. K. Butterfield. His term expired in January 2011, and he did not seek re-election in 2010.

== Early life and education ==
Born in Brooklyn, Brady enlisted in the United States Army in 1965 as a private and was decorated for his service in the Vietnam War. Brady then served as a special agent with the Bureau of Alcohol, Tobacco and Firearms, assigned to Milwaukee. Brady earned a Bachelor of Science degree in criminal justice from the University of Nebraska Omaha. In 1977, he earned a Master of Science in criminal justice from the John Jay College of Criminal Justice. He also earned a J.D. degree from the California Western School of Law and was awarded the Dean's Award. Justice Brady is a member of the state bar of Georgia, the North Carolina state bar, and the District of Columbia bar.

== Career ==
Brady retired from the United States Army Reserve as a colonel (O-6) in 1993, having held military police, special operations, aviation command, and staff assignments. In 1968, while on active duty, Justice Brady was awarded the Distinguished Flying Cross, Bronze Star Medal, Air Medal with Valor Device for heroism and 2nd-18th Oak Leaf Cluster, Army Commendation Medal with Valor Device for heroism and the Vietnam Cross of Gallantry with Bronze Star. In 1966, he graduated from Infantry Officer Candidate School and earned the Parachutist Badge, Pathfinder Badge, Special Forces Tab, and was subsequently awarded the Senior Army Aviation Badge.

=== Legal career ===
Upon graduating law school in 1978, Justice Brady began in private practice in Fayetteville, North Carolina. He continued with the private Law firm of Brady and Brady until 2003, when he took office as an associate justice for the North Carolina Supreme Court. Since retiring from the Supreme Court of North Carolina, he has joined the Brady Law Firm. His area of practice is criminal defense.

For two decades, Justice Brady's area of practice was litigation in both state and federal courts in Eastern North Carolina. As a citizen-soldier, Justice Brady represented members of the armed forces in both administrative matters and general courts-martial under the Uniform Code of Military Justice. In 2002, the people of the "Old North State" elected Justice Brady to serve as an associate justice on their State's highest court.

He is additionally admitted to practice in the United States Supreme Court, the United States Court of Appeals for the Fourth Circuit, the United States Court of Appeals for the District of Columbia Circuit, the United States Army Court of Military Appeals for Armed Forces, and the United States Army Court of Criminal Appeals.

== Personal life ==
Brady is a Southern Baptist. He and his family are members of Village Baptist Church in Fayetteville, North Carolina, where Brady also served as a member of the personnel committee.

== Electoral history ==
North Carolina Supreme Court Associate Justice (Butterfield seat) Republican primary election, 2002
Party	Candidate	Votes	%
Republican	Edward Thomas Brady	162,956	50.24%
Republican	Ralph Walker	161,420	49.76%
Total votes		324,376	100%

North Carolina Supreme Court Associate Justice (Butterfield seat) general election, 2002
Party	Candidate	Votes	%
Republican	Edward Thomas Brady	1,159,476	53.88%
Democratic	G. K. Butterfield (incumbent)	992,603	46.12%
Total votes		2,152,079	100%
Republican gain from Democratic			

Legal offices
Preceded by G. K. Butterfield	Associate Justice of the North Carolina Supreme Court; 2003–2011	Succeeded by Barbara Jackson
