= John Webb (judge) =

American judge

John Webb (September 18, 1926 – September 18, 2008) was an American jurist who served as an associate justice of the North Carolina Supreme Court (1986–1998). Prior to serving on North Carolina's highest court, Justice Webb had been a Superior Court (trial) judge and a judge of the North Carolina Court of Appeals.

Webb was born in Nash County, North Carolina but lived most of his life in Wilson, North Carolina where one of his law partners was future Governor Jim Hunt. He was a veteran of the United States Navy, graduated Phi Beta Kappa from the University of North Carolina at Chapel Hill and from law school at Columbia University.

As a trial and appellate court judge, Webb was actively involved in the controversy over gay rights. Earlier in his career, he gave or upheld long prison sentences for consensual sex in several notable prosecutions under North Carolina's felony crime against nature law, two of which were upheld by the United States Supreme Court. In 1974, as a trial court judge in Wilson Count, Judge Webb presided over the trial of Eugene Enslin for crime against nature and sentenced him to a year in prison. Enslin's appeal to the U.S. Supreme Court was denied in 1975 at the same time that it upheld Virginia's sodomy law in Doe v. Commonwealth's Attorney. State v. Enslin, 214 S.E.2nd 318, appeal dismissed, 217 S.E. 2nd 669 (N.C. 1975), certiorari denied, #75-897 (U.S. 1975).

In 1979, Judge Webb authored the North Carolina Court of Appeals decision upholding North Carolina's crime against nature statute against legal challenges to prosecuting private consensual male-female sex in State v. Poe, 252 S.E.2nd 843 (1979). The case involved a five-year prison sentence. Judge Webb's opinion held that North Carolina's crime against nature statute includes a consensual fellatio between a man and a woman, that the constitutional right of privacy does not prohibit prosecution for consensual fellatio in private between a man and a woman, and that the statute as applied is not unconstitutionally vague. In rejecting the vagueness challenge, Judge Webb cited previous precedents and then said "We do not rest on this. We believe that persons of ordinary intelligence would conclude a fellatio between a man and a woman would be classified as a crime against nature and prohibited by GS 14-177. This keeps it from being unconstitutionally vague."

The U.S. Supreme Court dismissed the appeal "for want of a substantial constitutional question" in Poe v. North Carolina, 445 U.S. 947 (1980).

Near the end of his tenure on the Supreme Court, Justice Webb wrote the sole dissent in a case in which the Court upheld a trial court taking custody of children away from a gay father because of the father's relationship with a male. Justice Webb wrote: "There is virtually no showing that these acts by the defendant have adversely affected the two children. The test should be how the action affects the children and not whether we approve of it" (Pulliam v. Smith, 348 N.C. 616, 631 [N.C. 1998]).

Webb died on September 18, 2008, on his 82nd birthday.
