= Wanda G. Bryant =

American judge

Judge of the North Carolina Court of Appeals
- In office January 1, 2003 – December 31, 2020
- Appointed by: Mike Easley
- Preceded by: K. Edward Greene
- Succeeded by: Fred Gore
- In office March 1, 2001 – December 31, 2002
- Appointed by: Mike Easley
- Preceded by: Robert H. Edmunds Jr.
- Succeeded by: Ann Marie Calabria

Personal details
- Born: June 26, 1956 (age 68); Southport, North Carolina, U.S.
- Education: Duke University; North Carolina Central University (JD)
- Website: www.judgewandabryant.com

Wanda G. Bryant (born June 26, 1956) is an American judge, who retired as an associate judge on the North Carolina Court of Appeals at the end of 2020.

Born in Southport, North Carolina, Bryant earned an undergraduate degree in history and comparative area studies from Duke University in 1977, then earned her Juris Doctor degree from North Carolina Central University in 1982. She worked as an assistant district attorney from 1983 to 1987, as an assistant U.S. attorney from 1989 to 1993, and as senior deputy attorney general for the state of North Carolina from 1993 to 2001. In 2001, Bryant was appointed to the North Carolina Court of Appeals by Gov. Mike Easley but was defeated for election in her own right when she ran as a Democrat in 2002. In 2004, she was elected to an eight-year term on the North Carolina Court of Appeals (expiring 2012). In the 2012 election, Bryant was endorsed for reelection for her final term by the (Raleigh) News and Observer, which cited her "wide-ranging experience in the law." Bryant chose not to run for reelection in 2020 and therefore, her term ended Dec. 31, 2020. Governor Roy Cooper awarded her the Order of the Long Leaf Pine.

Bryant is married and has one child.

== See also ==
- List of African-American jurists
