= Rick Elmore =

American judge

Rick Elmore is an American judge who previously served as a judge of the North Carolina Court of Appeals.

Elmore earned his undergraduate degree in 1974 from Guilford College in North Carolina, and worked for the North Carolina Department of Correction before earning his Juris Doctor (J.D.) degree from North Carolina Central University in 1982. He practiced law in Greensboro, North Carolina for twenty years before being elected to an eight-year term on the North Carolina Court of Appeals in 2002 as a Republican. Elmore chose not to run for a third term in 2018.

He is divorced and has two children.
