= North Carolina Court of Appeals =

Appellate court in North Carolina, US

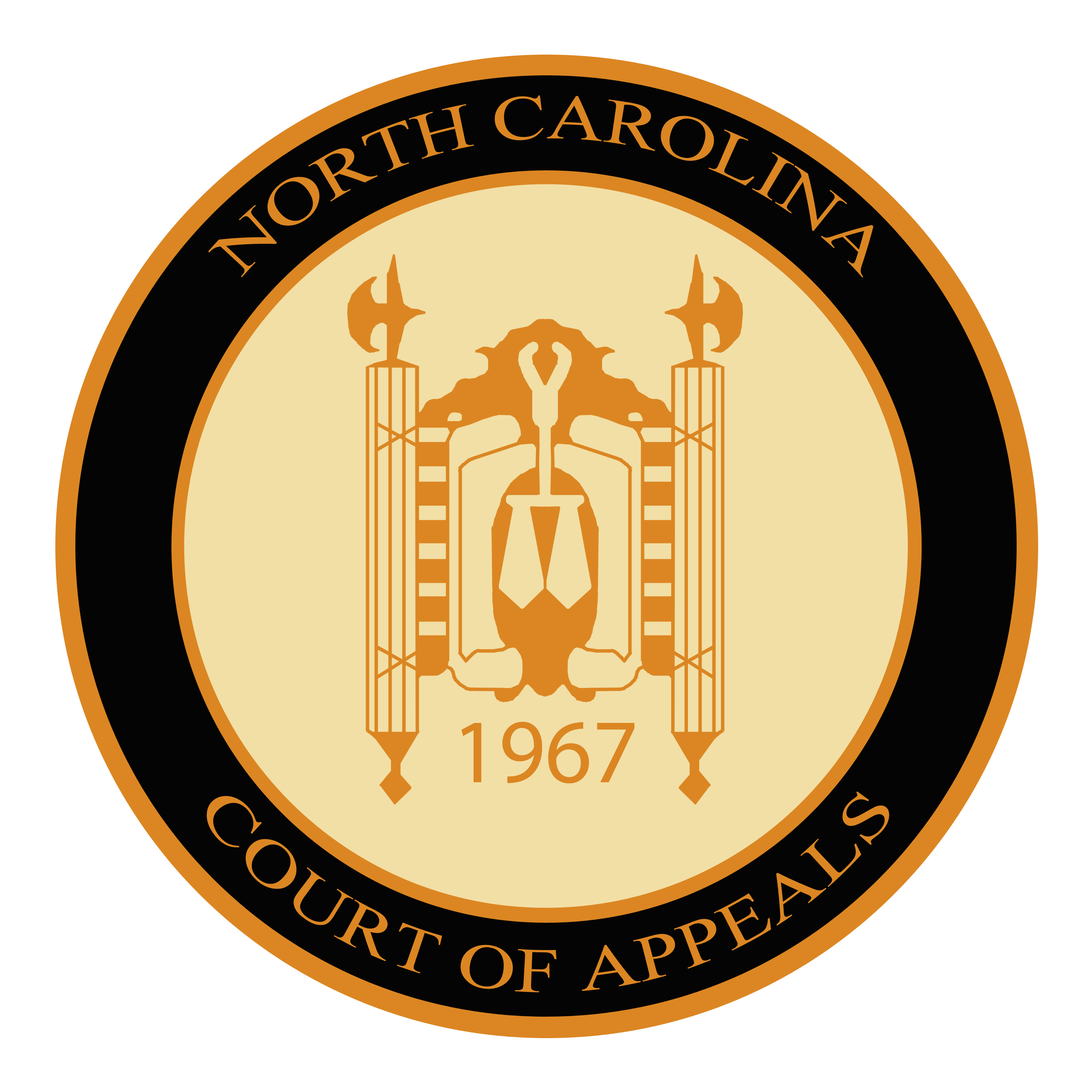
- Seal of the North Carolina Court of Appeals

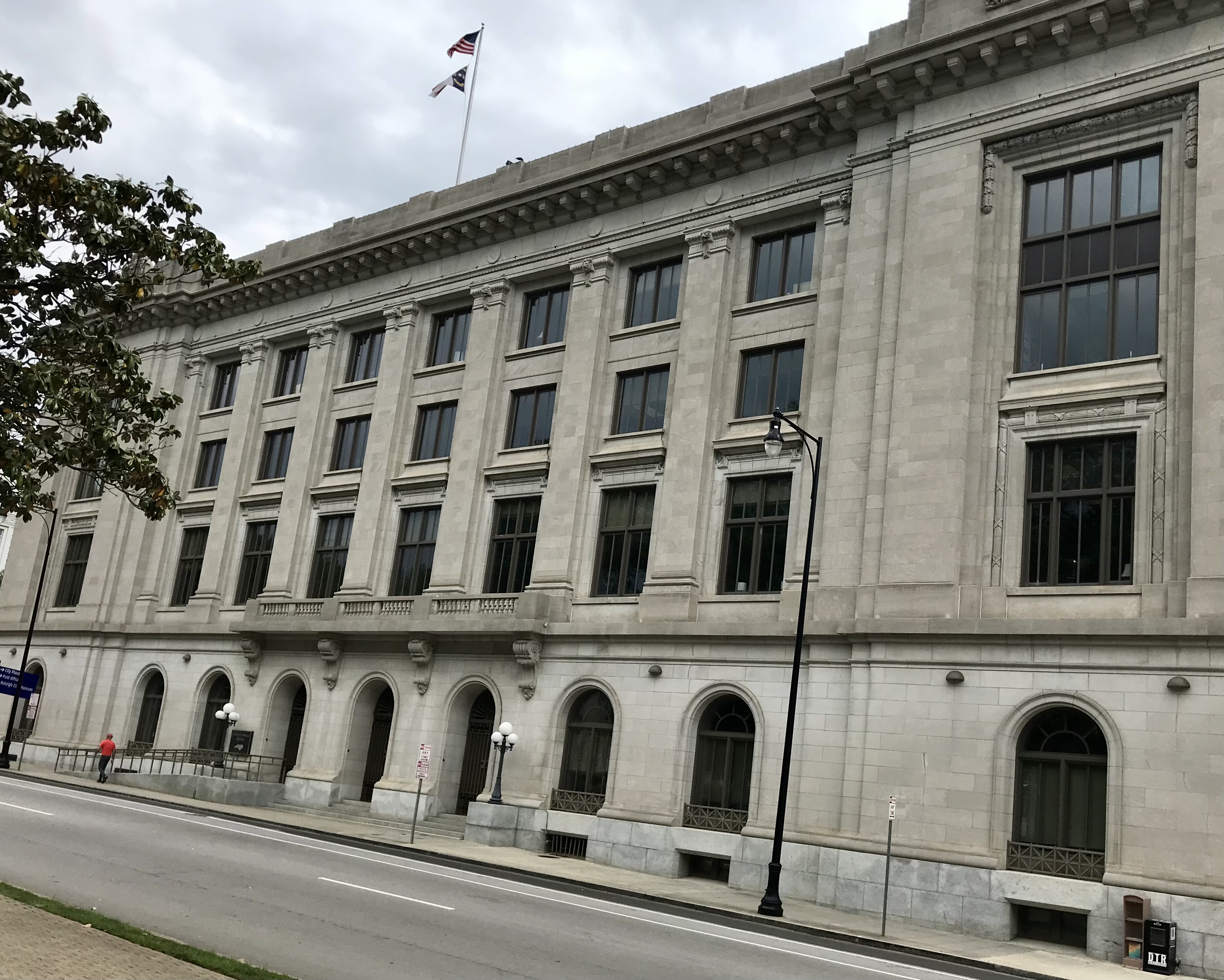
- Court of Appeals Building
- Established: 1967
- Location: Raleigh, North Carolina
- Composition method: Partisan election
- Authorised by: Constitution of North Carolina
- Appeals to: North Carolina Supreme Court
- Judge term length: 8 years (mandatory retirement at the age of 76)
- Number of positions: 15
- Website: Court of Appeals

Chief Judge
- Currently: Chris Dillon

The North Carolina Court of Appeals (in case citation, N.C. Ct. App.) is the only intermediate appellate court in the state of North Carolina. It is composed of fifteen members who sit in rotating panels of three. The Court of Appeals was created by the North Carolina General Assembly in 1967 after voters approved a constitutional amendment in 1965 which "authorized the creation of an intermediate court of appeals to relieve pressure on the North Carolina Supreme Court."

Judges serve eight-year terms and are elected in statewide elections. The General Assembly made Court of Appeals elections non-partisan starting with the 2004 elections, but later made them partisan again after the 2016 elections.

== History ==
The creation of a Court of Appeals in North Carolina was first authorized by a constitutional amendment in 1965, but did not occur until a statute was made effective on January 1, 1967. It initially had six judges, but in 1969 was expanded to nine. The court was expanded in 1977 to 12 judges and in 2000 to 15.

== Function ==
The Court of Appeals, along with the Supreme Court, constitute the Appellate Division within North Carolina's unified court system, the General Court of Justice. Its structure is determined by statute.

The court comprises 15 members, with one designated as a chief judge by the chief justice of the Supreme Court of North Carolina. Judges of the court are elected in statewide races to serve eight-year terms. Judges of the court convene in three member panels to hear cases. Rulings of one panel are binding upon other panels of the court and lower courts and can only be overruled by the Supreme Court. The panels are convened in such a manner that all judges are rotated to hear an equal number of cases with each of their colleagues. There is no mechanism by which the judges can be empaneled en banc.

== Current judges ==
Seat	Name	Born	Start	Term ends (Note: Term ends Dec. 31 of the year listed.)	Mandatory retirement (Note: Judges must retire on the last day of the month in which they turn age 76.)	Party	Law school
6	Chris Dillon, Chief Judge	April 20, 1965 (age 61)	January 1, 2013	2028	April 30, 2041	Republican	UNC
9	Donna Stroud	June 28, 1964 (age 62)	January 1, 2007	2030	June 30, 2040	Republican	Campbell
10	John Tyson	July 14, 1953 (age 73)	January 1, 2015 (Note: Previously elected to Seat 13 in 2000, and took office January 1, 2001 – December 31, 2008.)	2030	July 31, 2029	Republican	Campbell
14	Valerie Zachary	August 28, 1962 (age 64)	July 31, 2015	2032	August 31, 2038	Republican	Harvard
1	John Arrowood	November 4, 1956 (age 70)	April 24, 2017 (Note: Previously appointed to Seat 12 and took office September 7, 2007 – December 31, 2008.)	2034	November 30, 2032	Democratic	UNC
3	Allegra Collins	January 13, 1972 (age 54)	January 1, 2019	2026	January 31, 2048	Democratic	Campbell
2	Toby Hampson	December 20, 1975 (age 50)	January 1, 2019	2034	December 31, 2051	Democratic	Campbell
7	Jeff Carpenter	1972 (age 53–54)	January 1, 2021	2028	August 31, 2048	Republican	Campbell
4	April Wood	August 10, 1973 (age 53)	January 1, 2021	2028	2049	Republican	Regent
5	Fred Gore	1974 (age 51–52)	January 1, 2021	2028	2050	Republican	Appalachian
13	Jefferson Griffin	October 7, 1980 (age 46)	January 1, 2021	2028	October 31, 2056	Republican	NCCU
8	Julee Flood	July 7, 1961 (age 65)	January 1, 2023	2030	July 31, 2037	Republican	UNH
11	Michael Stading	January 24, 1981 (age 45)	January 1, 2023	2030	January 31, 2057	Republican	Campbell
12	Tom Murry	May 8, 1977 (age 49)	January 1, 2025	2032	May 31, 2053	Republican	Campbell
15	Chris Freeman	August 5, 1977 (age 49)	January 1, 2025	2032	August 31, 2053	Republican	Regent

== Former judges ==
A partial list of former judges is listed below:

- Hunter Murphy
- Allison Riggs
- Lucy Inman
- Darren Jackson
- Christopher Brook
- Wanda Bryant
- Linda McGee
- Reuben Young
- Mark A. Davis
- Ann Marie Calabria
- Rick Elmore
- Douglas McCullough
- Linda Stephens
- Wendy Enochs
- Martha A. Geer
- Sanford L. Steelman Jr.
- Lisa Bell
- Sam Ervin, IV
- Robert C. Hunter
- Robert N. Hunter Jr.
- John C. Martin
- Cressie Thigpen
- Cheri Beasley
- Barbara Jackson
- James A. Wynn Jr.
- Eric L. Levinson
- Hugh Brown Campbell Jr.
- Robin E. Hudson
- Patricia Timmons-Goodson
- Loretta Copeland Biggs
- Robert H. Edmunds Jr.
- Mark Martin
- Sarah Parker
- Alan Z. Thornburg
- Robert F. Orr
- John Webb
- Jack L. Cozort
- John B. Lewis Jr.
- Ralph A. Walker
- Sidney S. Eagles Jr.
- Joe John
- S. Gerald Arnold
- Donald L. Smith
- Allyson Kay Duncan
- Burley Mitchell
- Clifton E. Johnson
- Willis Whichard
- Charles Becton
- Richard Erwin
- Robert M. Martin
- Fred Hedrick
- James M. Baley Jr.
- Walter E. Brock
- David M. Britt
- James C. Farthing
- Naomi E. Morris
- Raymond B. Mallard
- Hugh B. Campbell
- Francis M. Parker
- Earl W. Vaughn

== See also ==
- North Carolina Supreme Court

== Works cited ==
- Orth, John V.; Newby, Paul M. (2013). The North Carolina State Constitution (second ed.). Oxford University Press. ISBN 9780199300655.
- Orth, John V. (September 2015). ""Without Precedential Value" -- When the Justices of the Supreme Court of North Carolina are Equally Divided". North Carolina Law Review. 93 (6): 1719–1756.
