= Norman Adrian Wiggins School of Law =

Private law school in Raleigh, North Carolina, United States

Coordinates: 35.7802°N 78.6430°W

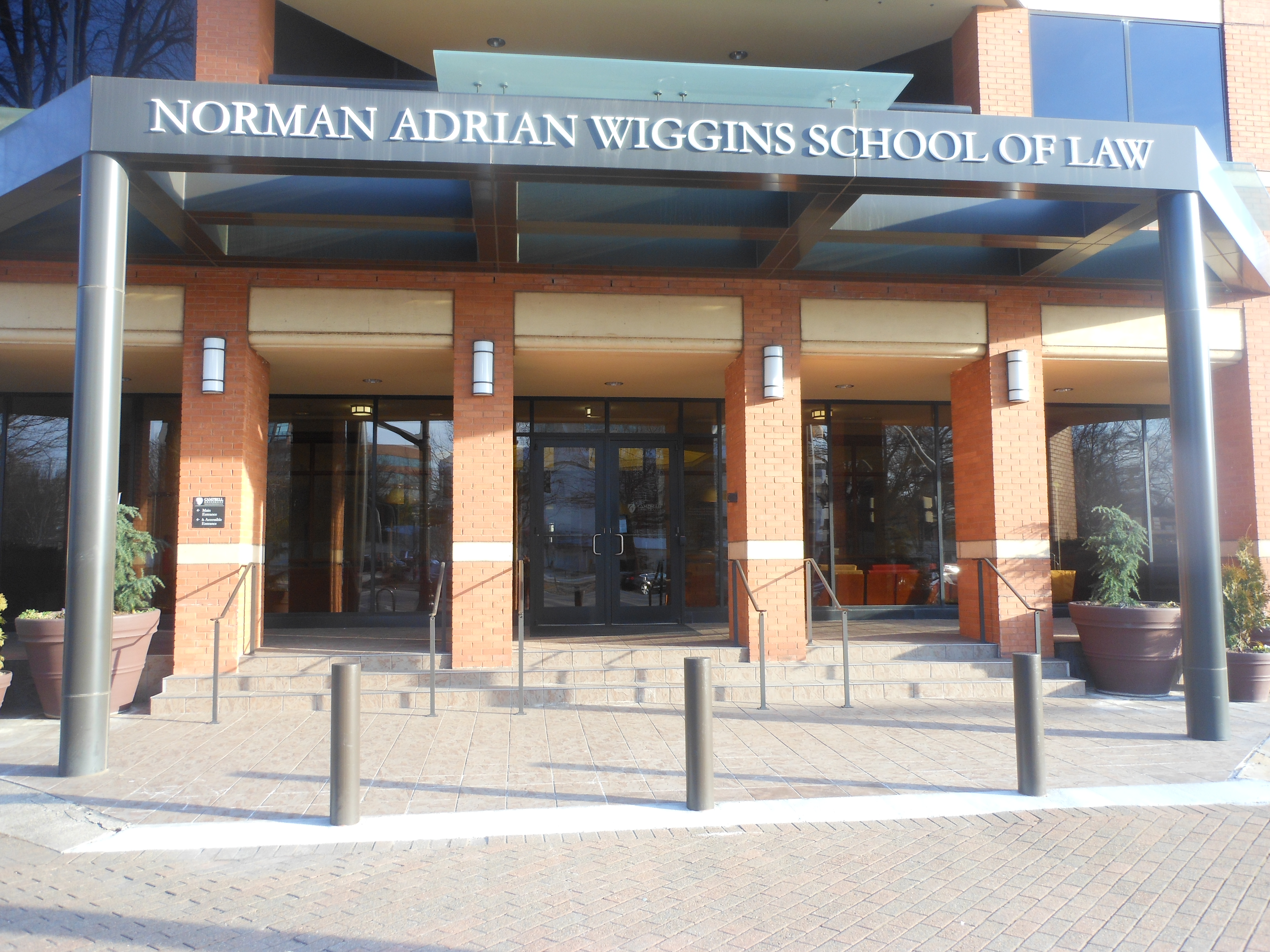
- Parent school: Campbell University
- Religious affiliation: Baptist
- Established: 1976; 50 years ago
- School type: Private
- Dean: J. Rich Leonard
- Location: Raleigh, North Carolina, United States
- Enrollment: 560
- Faculty: 35 (full-time) 77 (part-time)
- USNWR ranking: 134th (tie) (2024)
- Bar pass rate: 75.51% (2022 first time takers)
- Website: https://law.campbell.edu

The Norman Adrian Wiggins School of Law (also known as Campbell Law School or Campbell University School of Law) is a private law school in Raleigh, North Carolina, United States. Founded in 1976, the law school is one of six graduate programs offered by Campbell University. The school is named after its founder, Norman Adrian Wiggins, former president and Chancellor of Campbell University, and creator of the institution's law division. Originally housed on the main campus of Campbell University in Buies Creek, the school moved to a newly constructed facility in downtown Raleigh in September, 2009.

== Academics ==
Campbell Law School has been accredited by the American Bar Association since 1979 and offers nine different joint degree programs.

=== Admissions ===
For the class entering in 2023, the school accepted 370 applicants out of 957 (38.66%) with 180 of those accepted enrolling, a 48.65% yield rate. Four students were not included in the acceptance statistics. The class consists of 184 students. The median LSAT score was 155 and the median undergraduate GPA was 3.48. Two students were not included in the GPA calculation. Its 25th/75th percentile LSAT scores and GPAs were 153/159 and 3.17/3.73.

=== Ranking ===
In 2025, U.S. News & World Report ranked Campbell Law tied at #134 out of 197 ABA accredited law schools.

== Bar passage ==
For 2022 bar exams, Campbell Law's first-time pass rate was 75.51%. The ultimate bar passage rate for the class of 2020 after two years was 95.59%, out of 141 graduates 136 took the examination with 130 test-takers ultimately passing.

== Employment ==
According to the schools's official ABA-required disclosures for 2023 graduates, within ten months after graduation 113 (76.87%) of the 147 member graduating class were employed in full-time positions requiring bar passage (i.e. as attorneys) and seven (4.76%) were employed in full-time JD advantage positions. Attorney positions were in various size law firms, most being in 1-10 attorney firms, five graduates obtained local or state judicial clerkships and one obtained a federal clerkship. 40 members of the class were otherwise employed in public interest, government, higher education, or business. 23 members (15.65%) of the class were unemployed or employed short–term or part–time.

According to the Department of Education, one year after graduation Campbell Law graduates had a median income of $44,508 and a median debt load of $140,880.

== Costs ==
The total cost of attendance (indicating the cost of tuition, fees, and living expenses) at Campbell Law for the 2023–24 academic year was $83,444, with tuition and required fees of $49,730 inclusive.
