= Lawing =

Lawing may refer to:

== People ==
- Garland Lawing, American baseball player
- Nellie Neal Lawing, American businesswoman
- W. Craig Lawing, American politician

== Places ==
- Lawing, Alaska, USA
- Lawing, Missouri, USA
- Lawing, Sarawak, Malaysia
