= Senator Wilson =

Senator Wilson may refer to:

== Members of the Northern Irish Senate ==
- Paddy Wilson (1933–1973), Northern Irish Senator from 1969 to 1973

== Members of the United States Senate ==
- Ephraim King Wilson II (1821–1891), U.S. Senator from Maryland from 1885 to 1891
- George A. Wilson (1884–1953), U.S. Senator from Iowa from 1943 to 1949
- Henry Wilson (1812–1875), U.S. Senator from Massachusetts from 1855 to 1873
- James F. Wilson (1828–1895), U.S. Senator from Iowa from 1883 to 1895
- James J. Wilson (1775–1824), U.S. Senator from New Jersey from 1815 to 1821
- John L. Wilson (1850–1912), U.S. Senator from Washington from 1895 to 1899
- Pete Wilson (born 1933), U.S. Senator from California from 1983 to 1991
- Robert Wilson (Missouri politician) (1803–1870), U.S. Senator from Missouri from 1862 to 1863

== United States state senate members ==
- Charles Wilson (Nebraska politician) (1900–1967), Nebraska State Senate
- Charlie Wilson (Ohio politician) (1943–2013), Ohio State Senate
- Charlie Wilson (Texas politician) (1933–2010), Texas State Senate
- Claire Wilson (politician) (born c. 1956), Washington State Senate
- David S. Wilson (born 1981), Alaska State Senate
- DeWitt C. Wilson (1827–1895), Wisconsin State Senate
- Earl Wilson (politician) (1906–1990), Indiana State Senate
- Eugene McLanahan Wilson (1833–1890), Minnesota State Senate
- Eugene T. Wilson (1852–1923), Washington State Senate
- Frederica Wilson (born 1942), Florida State Senate
- George P. Wilson (1840–1920), Minnesota State Senate
- George W. Wilson (politician) (1840–1909), Ohio State Senate
- Herbert A. Wilson (1870–1934), Massachusetts State Senate
- Isaac Wilson (1780–1848), New York State Senate
- James Charles Wilson (1816–1861), Texas State Senate
- Jason Wilson (politician) (born 1968), Ohio State Senate
- Jerome L. Wilson (1931–2019), New York State Senate
- Jim Wilson (Oklahoma politician) (born 1947), Oklahoma State Senate
- Joe Wilson (American politician) (born 1947), South Carolina State Senate
- John Henry Wilson (Kentucky politician) (1846–1923), Kentucky State Senate
- John Lyde Wilson (1784–1849), South Carolina State Senate
- John Thomas Wilson (1811–1891), Ohio State Senate
- Joseph Harvey Wilson (1810–1884), North Carolina State Senate
- Lori Wilson (Florida politician) (1937–2019), Florida State Senate
- Louis Dicken Wilson (1789–1847), North Carolina State Senate
- Mike Wilson (Kentucky politician) (born 1951), Kentucky State Senate
- Robert Patterson Clark Wilson (1834–1916), Missouri State Senate
- Roger B. Wilson (born 1948), Missouri State Senate
- Samuel Franklin Wilson (1845–1923), Tennessee State Senate
- Stanley C. Wilson (1879–1967), Vermont State Senate
- Stanyarne Wilson (1860–1928), South Carolina State Senate
- Stephen Fowler Wilson (1821–1897), Pennsylvania State Senate
- Steve Wilson (Ohio politician) (fl. 1970s–2010s), Ohio State Senate
- Thomas B. Wilson (1852–1929), New York State Senate
- Thomas Wilson (Minnesota politician) (1827–1910), Minnesota State Senate
- Thomas Wilson (Virginia politician) (1765–1826), Virginia State Senate
- William C. Wilson (judge) (1812–1882), Vermont State Senate
- William K. Wilson (1817–1898), Wisconsin State Senate
- William Wilson (Wisconsin politician) (fl. 1850s–1870s), Wisconsin State Senate
- Yvonne S. Wilson (1929–2019), Missouri State Senate
