= John T. Henley =

American politician

Member of the North Carolina Senate from the 10th district

Personal details
- Born: John Tannery Henley; August 10, 1921 Wadesboro, North Carolina
- Died: March 17, 2012 (aged 90) Fayetteville, North Carolina
- Party: Democratic

John Tannery Henley (August 10, 1921 – March 17, 2012) was a North Carolina politician and pharmacist from Hope Mills, North Carolina. He was born in Wadesboro, North Carolina. He served as mayor of Hope Mills, as a member of the North Carolina House of Representatives and of the North Carolina Senate, where he served as President Pro Tempore for the 1975–76 and 1977-78 General Assemblies. He died in 2012 in Fayetteville, North Carolina.

Preceded by Gordon P. Allen	President pro tempore of the North Carolina Senate; 1975–1978	Succeeded by W. Craig Lawing
