= Lindsay C. Warren =

American politician (1889–1976)

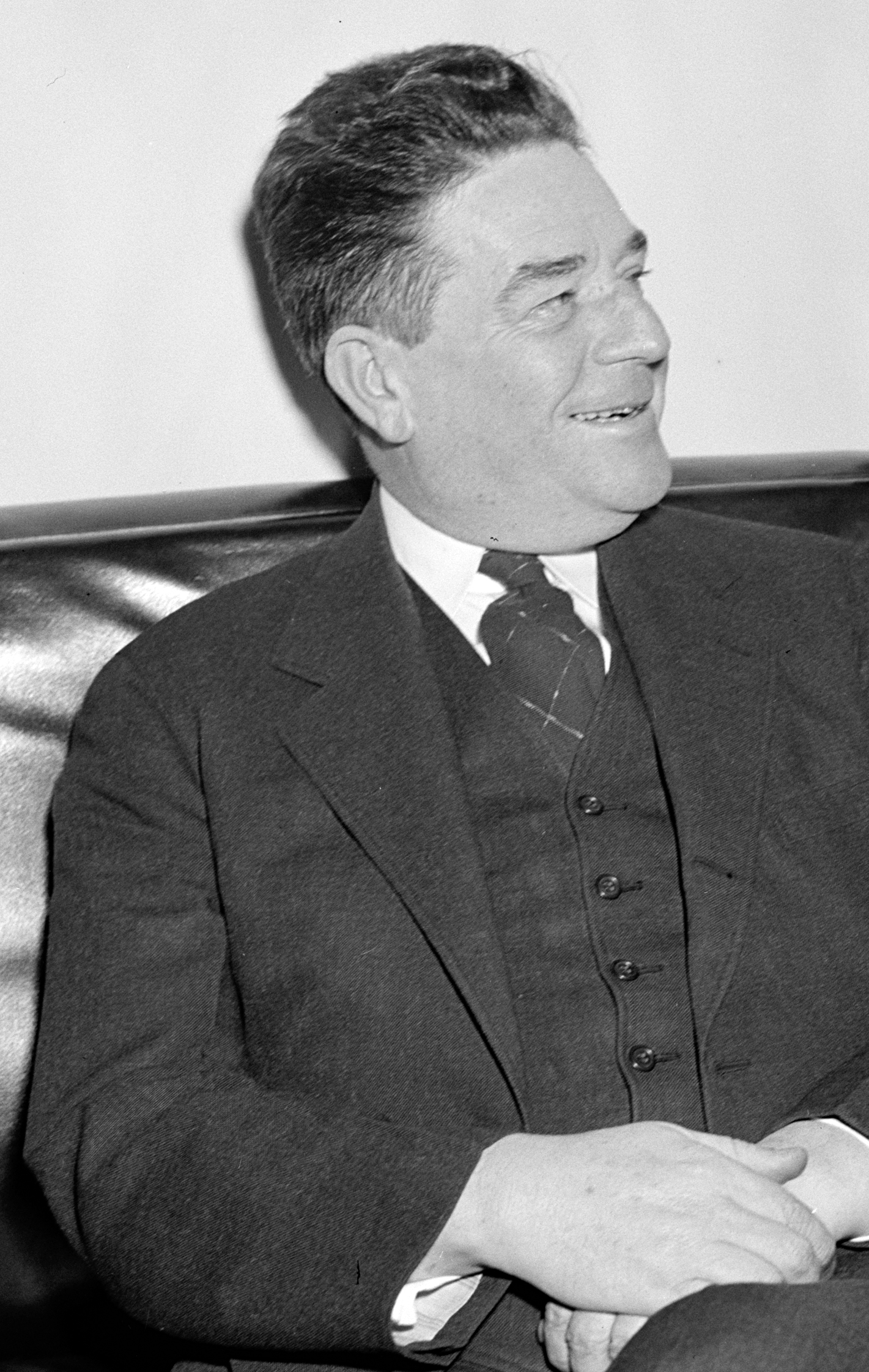
- Warren in 1939

3rd Comptroller General of the United States
- In office November 1, 1940 – April 30, 1954
- President: Franklin D. Roosevelt; Harry S. Truman; Dwight D. Eisenhower
- Preceded by: Fred H. Brown
- Succeeded by: Joseph Campbell

Member of the U.S. House of Representatives from North Carolina's 1st district
- In office March 4, 1925 – November 1, 1940
- Preceded by: Hallett S. Ward
- Succeeded by: Herbert C. Bonner

Personal details
- Born: December 16, 1889 Washington, North Carolina, U.S.
- Died: December 28, 1976 (aged 87) Washington, North Carolina, U.S.
- Party: Democratic
- Education: University of North Carolina at Chapel Hill

Lindsay Carter Warren (December 16, 1889 – December 28, 1976) was a Democratic politician who served as a U.S. Congressman from North Carolina between 1925 and 1940 and the third comptroller general of the United States from 1940 to 1954.

== Early life and education ==
Born in Washington, North Carolina, Warren was the son of prominent lawyer Charles F. Warren and the grandson of politician Edward J. Warren. Warren studied at Bingham School in Asheville from 1903 to 1906. He attended the University of North Carolina at Chapel Hill from 1906 to 1908 and then from 1911 to 1912 (the second time studying law). He was admitted to the bar in 1912 and practiced law in his hometown of Washington.

== Political career ==
Also in 1912, Warren was named county attorney for Beaufort County, North Carolina, and elected the chairman of the executive committee for the county Democratic Party; he would hold both posts until 1925. He was elected to the North Carolina Senate in 1917 and 1919, serving as Senate president pro tem in 1919 and 1920, and as the chair of the special legislative commission on workmen's compensation acts. In 1920, Warren succeeded in preventing a Senate vote on ratification of the 19th Amendment, which would guarantee women's suffrage (nevertheless, Tennessee ratified the amendment the next day, making the amendment effective throughout the country).

In 1923, Warren was sent to the North Carolina House of Representatives for a single term before being elected, in 1924, to the 69th United States Congress. He was re-elected seven times, serving in the U.S. House of Representatives from March 4, 1925 until November 1, 1940, when he resigned from Congress. During the 72nd through 76th Congresses, he was chairman of the Committee on Accounts. He was also a delegate to the Democratic National Conventions in 1932 and 1940, and chaired the North Carolina Democratic Convention in 1930 and 1934.

== Comptroller General ==
Warren left Congress to accept the post of Comptroller General of the United States, serving in that role for almost fourteen years, until May 1, 1954. President Franklin Roosevelt had offered Warren the post in 1936 and in 1938 but he had declined it. As Comptroller General, Warren led the General Accounting Office through World War II and worked with the Truman Committee to outlaw kickbacks by subcontractors to defense contractors. He oversaw an increase in the agency's workforce and extensively reorganized GAO.

== Later life and legacy ==
Warren returned to the North Carolina House of Representatives for two additional terms in 1959 and 1961, and died in 1976 in his hometown of Washington, North Carolina. His son, Lindsay, Jr., followed his father into law and into the North Carolina legislature.

A 2.8-mile bridge, one of the longest in North Carolina, was built in 1960 over the Alligator River and is named in honor of Warren.

The M/V Lindsay Warren, a 25 car ferry, was also named for him. The 112 ft. vessel was built in 1970 for the North Carolina Department of Transportation Ferry Division to cross Hatteras Inlet between Hatteras and Ocracoke Islands on the outer banks of North Carolina. The M/V Lindsay Warren was taken out of service and sold by NCDOT. Now renamed Marissa Mae Nicole it operates on Mobile Bay.

U.S. House of Representatives
Preceded by Hallett Sydney Ward	Member of the U.S. House of Representatives from North Carolina's 1st congressional district 1925–1940	Succeeded by Herbert C. Bonner
