= Senator Royall =

Senator Royall may refer to:

- J. Powell Royall (1874–1945), Virginia State Senate
- Kenneth Claiborne Royall (1894–1971), North Carolina State Senate
- Kenneth Claiborne Royall Jr. (1918–1999), North Carolina State Senate
