= Willis Whichard =

American judge (1940–2025)

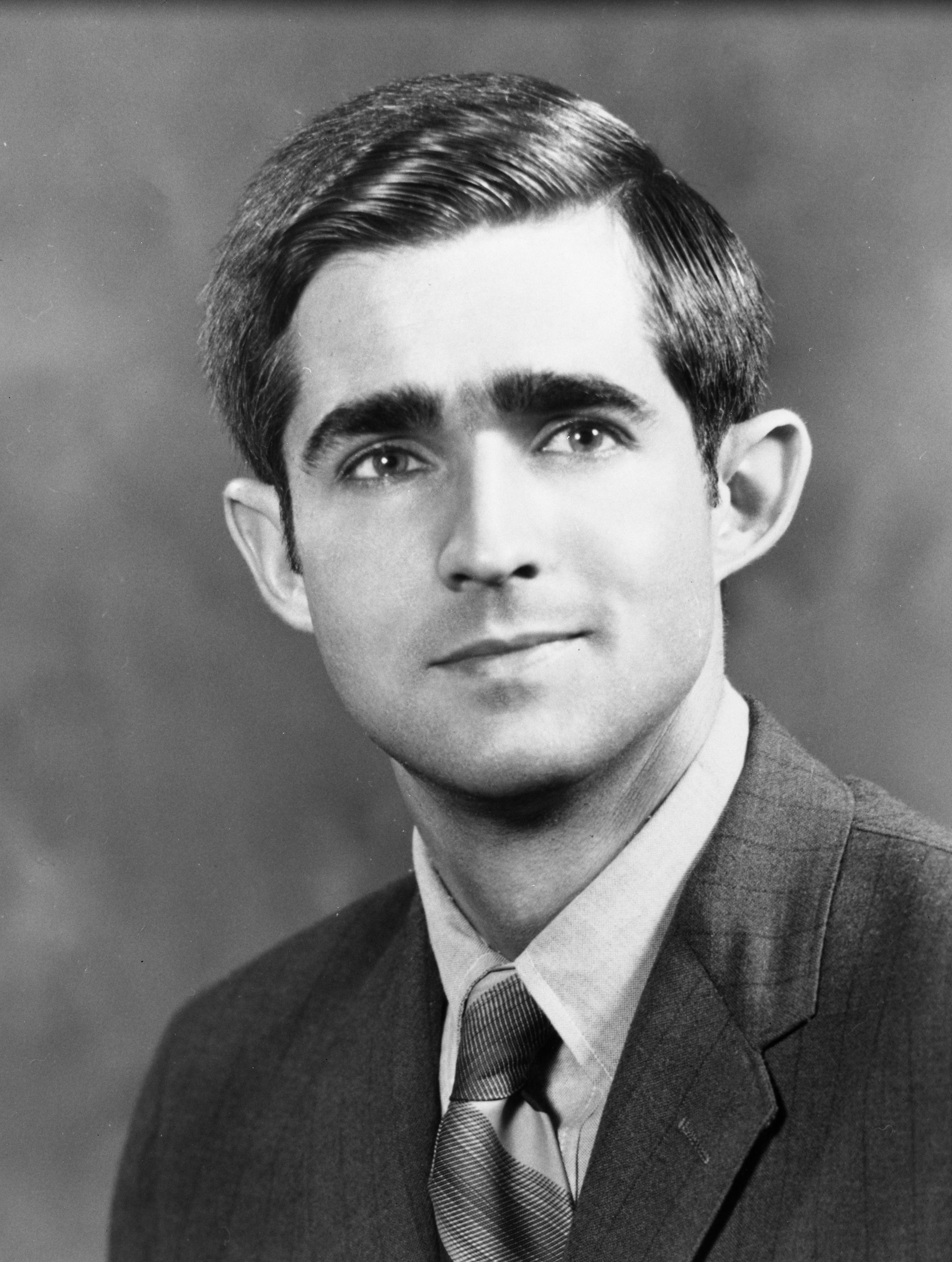
- c. 1971

Associate Justice of the North Carolina Supreme Court
- In office 1986–1998
- Appointed by: Jim Hunt
- Preceded by: James G. Exum
- Succeeded by: Mark Martin

Judge of the North Carolina Court of Appeals
- In office 1980–1986
- Appointed by: Jim Hunt
- Preceded by: Frank M. Parker
- Succeeded by: Robert F. Orr

Member of the North Carolina Senate from the 13th district
- In office January 1, 1975 – January 1, 1980
- Preceded by: Gordon Allen
- Succeeded by: William Greenwood Hancock Jr.

Member of the North Carolina House of Representatives from the 16th district
- In office 1973–1975
- Preceded by: Bobby W. Rogers; James Davis Speed
- Succeeded by: Pat Oakes Griffin

Member of the North Carolina House of Representatives from the 18th district
- In office 1971–1973
- Preceded by: W. Hance Hofler; Wade H. Penny Jr.
- Succeeded by: S. Gerald Arnold; Jimmy Lewis Love

Personal details
- Born: May 24, 1940 Durham, North Carolina, U.S.
- Died: November 18, 2025 (aged 85) Chapel Hill, North Carolina, U.S.
- Party: Democratic
- Education: University of North Carolina; University of Virginia

Willis Padgett Whichard (May 24, 1940 – November 18, 2025) was an American lawyer and a prominent figure in North Carolina politics and education. Whichard is the only person in the history of North Carolina who has served in both houses of the state legislature and on both of the state's appellate courts. He died in Chapel Hill, North Carolina, on November 18, 2025, at the age of 85.

== Legal and civil service career ==
Born in Durham, North Carolina on May 24, 1940, he began his legal career as a clerk to NC Supreme Court Justice (later Chief Justice) William H. Bobbitt. From 1966 to 1980, Whichard practiced law in Durham and entered politics, being elected first to the North Carolina House of Representatives and then to the North Carolina Senate. In 1980, he was appointed by Governor Jim Hunt to the North Carolina Court of Appeals, where he served until, he became a justice of the North Carolina Supreme Court in 1986. Whichard was the justice who, in 1996, denied the appeal of Dontae Sharpe, a man later discovered to be innocent after spending more than 20 years in jail. Whichard determined there had been "no error" in the original case.

Whichard retired from the Court in 1998 and served as Dean of the Norman Adrian Wiggins School of Law at Campbell University from 1999 until his retirement as Dean in 2006, when he became a partner at the law firm of Moore & Van Allen in its Research Triangle Park office. In September 2013, he joined the firm of Tillman, Whichard & Cagle, PLLC.

A student of North Carolina judicial history, Whichard has written a biography of James Iredell, a North Carolinian who led the state’s Federalists in supporting ratification of the Constitution and was later appointed to the United States Supreme Court by President George Washington.

== Education ==
- Durham City Schools (1958)
- University of North Carolina at Chapel Hill. A.B in History (1962)
- University of North Carolina at Chapel Hill School of Law. J.D. (1965)
- University of Virginia. L.L.M. in Judicial Process (1984)
- University of Virginia. S.J.D Doctor of Judicial Science (1994)

== Military ==
- NC Army National Guard. Enlisted man (1966–1972)
- NC National Guard Association. Life Member

== Public service ==
Judge Whichard has the distinction of being the only person in the history of the State of North Carolina to have served as member of the two bodies of the NC Legislature (House and Senate) and on both of the state's appellate courts (Appeals and Supreme Court).

- NC General Statutes Commission. Member, 1969–1973
- NC House of Representatives. Member, 1970–1974
- NC Senate. Member, 1974–1980
- NC Court of Appeals. Judge, 1980–1986
- NC Supreme Court. Associate Justice, 1986–1998

== Professional positions ==
Whichard held a number of other professional positions:

- Law clerk to Associate Justice (later Chief Justice) William H. Bobbitt in the NC Supreme Court (1965–66)
- Attorney in Durham, North Carolina, at the firm Powe, Porter, Alphin & Whichard (1966–1980)
- Adjunct professor of law, University of North Carolina at Chapel Hill (1986–1999)
- Dean and professor of law, Campbell University (1999–2006)

== Honors and awards ==
- UNC: Phi Beta Kappa, Order of the Golden Fleece, Order of the Grail, Order of the Old Well, The Amphoterothen Society, Phi Alpha Theta, NC Law Review Board of Editors, Order of the Coif
- Distinguished Service Award, Durham NC Jaycees (1971)
- Outstanding Youth Service Award, NC Juvenile Correctional Association (1975)
- Outstanding Legislator Award, NC Academy of Trial Lawyers (1975)
- Citizen of the Year award. Eno Valley Civitan Club (1982)
- Hayti Development Corporation Honoree. (1982)
- Faith Active in Public Life Award. NC Council of Churches (1983)
- Outstanding Appellate Judge Award. NC Academy of Trial Lawyers (1983)
- Durham High School Hall of Fame (1987)
- Leadership Award, NC Alternative Sentencing Association (1988)
- Editor's Quill Award. International Association of Torch Clubs (1990)
- Distinguished Alumnus Award, UNC School of Law (1993)
- Civic Honor Award, Greater Durham Chamber of Commerce (1996)
- Distinguished Alumnus Award, University of North Carolina at Chapel Hill (2000)
- Christopher Crittendon Award, North Carolina Literary and Historical Association (2002)
- Distinguished Service medal, University of North Carolina Alumni Association (2004)
- Peabody Award, University of North Carolina School of Education (2025)

North Carolina House of Representatives
| Preceded by W. Hance Hofler; Wade H. Penny Jr. | Member of the North Carolina House of Representatives from the 18th district 1971–1973; Served alongside: George Miller Jr., Kenneth Claiborne Royall Jr. | Succeeded by S. Gerald Arnold; Jimmy Lewis Love |
| Preceded by Bobby W. Rogers; James Davis Speed | Member of the North Carolina House of Representatives from the 16th district 1973–1975; Served alongside: Mickey Michaux, George Miller Jr. | Succeeded by Pat Oakes Griffin |
North Carolina Senate
| Preceded by Gordon Allen | Member of the North Carolina Senate from the 13th district 1975–1980; Served alongside: Kenneth Claiborne Royall Jr. | Succeeded by William Greenwood Hancock Jr. |
Legal offices
| Preceded by Frank M. Parker | Judge of the North Carolina Court of Appeals; 1980–1986 | Succeeded by Robert F. Orr |
| Preceded by James G. Exum | Associate Justice of the North Carolina Supreme Court; 1986–1998 | Succeeded by Mark Martin |
Academic offices
| Preceded by Patrick K. Hetrick | Dean of the Campbell University School of Law; 1999–2006 | Succeeded by Melissa A. Essary |
