= President pro tempore of the North Carolina Senate =

Political position

- State seal

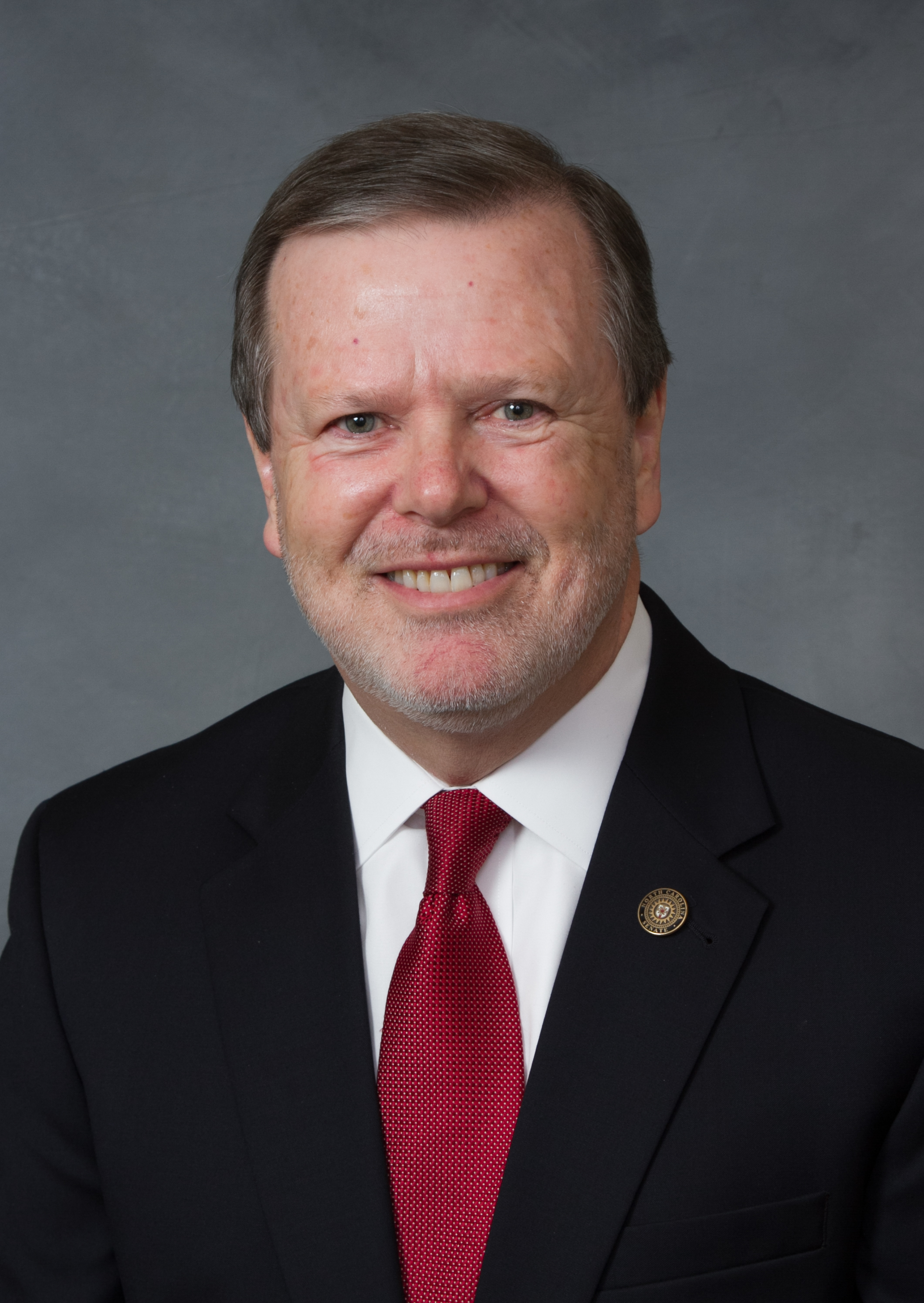
- Incumbent; Phil Berger since January 26, 2011
- North Carolina Senate
- Status: Presiding officer
- Seat: North Carolina State Legislative Building, Raleigh, North Carolina
- Nominator: Major parties (normally)
- Appointer: The North Carolina Senate
- Term length: two years (currently)
- Constituting instrument: North Carolina Constitution
- Formation: 1777
- First holder: Samuel Ashe
- Succession: Second

The president pro tempore of the North Carolina Senate (more commonly, "Pro-Tem") is the highest-ranking (internally elected) officer of one house of the North Carolina General Assembly. The president of the Senate is the Lieutenant Governor of North Carolina, but the president pro tempore actually holds most of the power and presides in the absence of the Lt. Governor. The president pro tempore, a senior member of the party with a majority of seats, appoints senators to committees and also appoints certain members of state boards and commissions. From 1777 to 1868, North Carolina had no Lieutenant Governor, and the highest-ranking officer of the Senate was known as the "Speaker". The Speaker of the Senate was next in line if the office of Governor became vacant. This occurred on two occasions.

Presidents pro tempore are elected at the beginning of each biennial session, currently in January of odd-numbered years. Between 1868 and 1992, it was rare for a president pro tempore to serve more than two terms. Marc Basnight, however, became arguably the most powerful North Carolina Senate leader in history and one of the state's most influential politicians when he served a record nearly 18 years as president pro tempore.

== History ==
Upon Republican Jim Gardner's assumption of lieutenant gubernatorial office in 1989, Democrats in the Senate modified the body's rules, transferring the powers to appoint committees and assign bills away from the lieutenant governor and to the president pro tempore. This dramatically increased the influence of the latter position.

== Powers and duties ==
The president pro tempore is responsible for appointing the members of the Senate's committees at the opening of each legislative session. They also have the power to appoint some members of state executive boards.

== North Carolina Senate presiding officers ==
=== Speakers ===
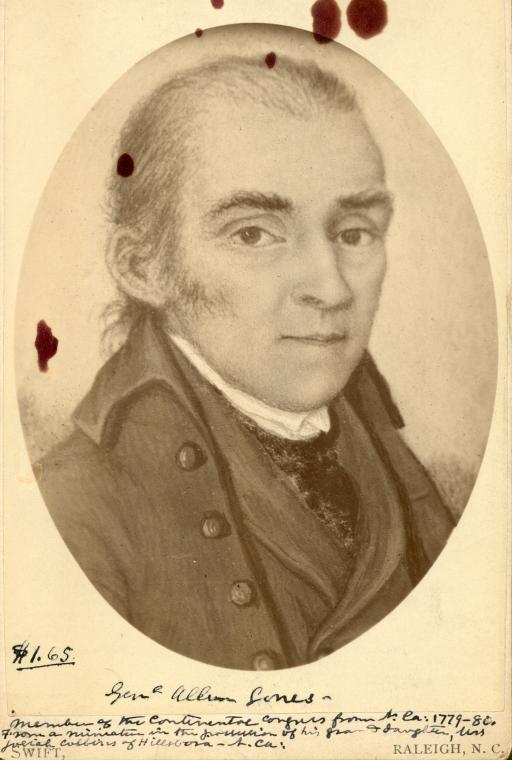
Allen Jones, 1778–1779

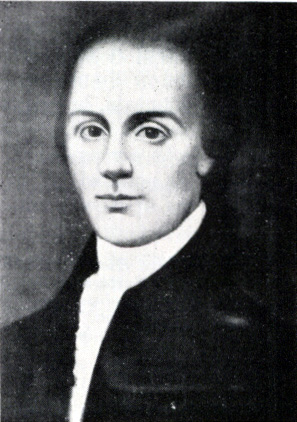
Abner Nash, 1779–1780

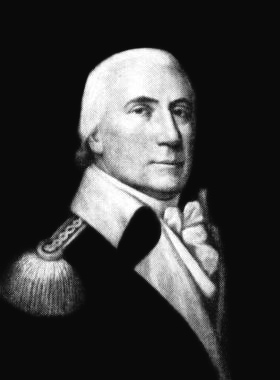
Alexander Martin, 1785

The following members were elected speakers of the Senate:

- Samuel Ashe 1777
- Whitmell Hill 1778
- Allen Jones 1778–1779
- Abner Nash 1779–1780
- Alexander Martin 1780–1782
- Richard Caswell 1782–1784
- Alexander Martin 1785
- James Coor 1786–1787
- Alexander Martin 1787–1788
- Richard Caswell 1789
- Charles Johnson 1789
- William Lenoir 1790–1795
- Benjamin Smith 1795–1799
- Joseph Riddick 1800–1804
- Alexander Martin 1805
- Joseph Riddick 1806–1811
- George Outlaw 1812–1814
- John Branch 1815–1817
- Bartlett Yancey 1817–1828
- Jesse Speight 1828–1829
- Bedford Brown 1829–1830
- David F. Caldwell 1830–1832
- William D. Moseley 1832–1835
- Hugh Waddell (Whig) 1836–1837
- Andrew Joyner 1838–1841
- Louis Dicken Wilson 1842–1843
- Burgess S. Gaither 1844–1845
- Andrew Joyner 1846–1847
- Calvin Graves 1848–1849
- Andrew Joyner 1849
- Weldon N. Edwards 1850–1852
- Warren Winslow 1854–1855
- William Waightstill Avery 1856–1857
- Henry Toole Clark 1858–1861
- Giles Mebane 1862–1865
- Thomas Settle 1865–1866
- C. S. Winstead 1866
- Matthias Manly 1866
- Joseph Harvey Wilson 1867

=== Presidents pro tempore ===
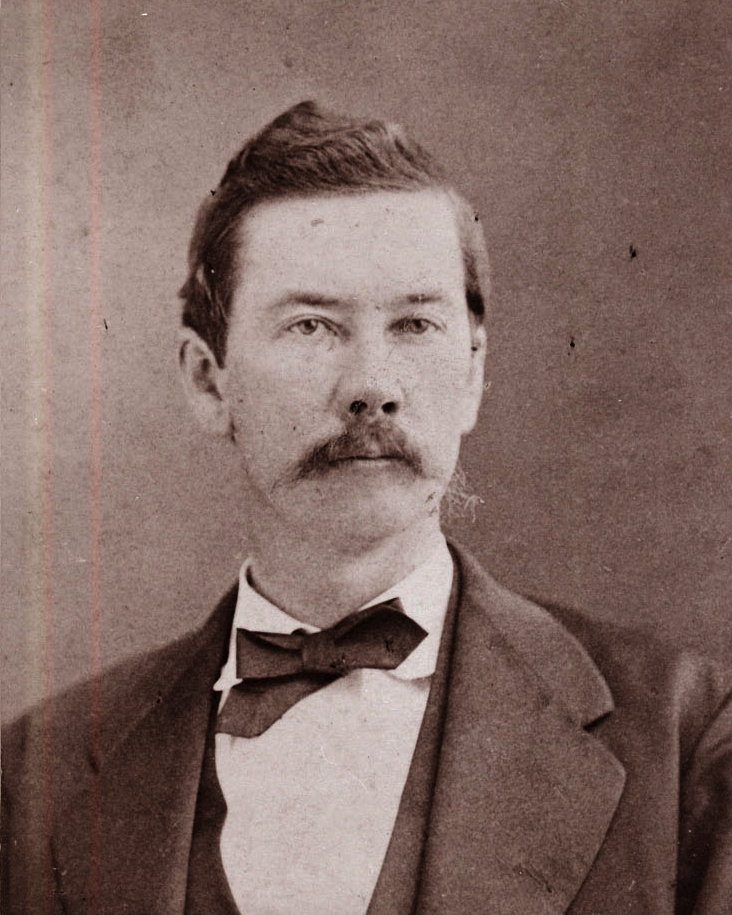
James L. Robinson 1876–1877

The following members were elected president pro tempore of the Senate:

- Charles S. Winstead (R) 1868–1869
- Edward Jenner Warren (Conservative/D) 1870–1872
- James Turner Morehead Jr. (Conservative/D) 1872–1875
- James L. Robinson (D) 1876–1877
- William A. Graham (D) 1879–1880
- William T. Dortch (D) 1881–1883
- Edwin T. Boykin (D) 1885–1887
- Edwin W. Kerr (D) 1889
- W. D. Turner (D) 1891
- John L. King (D) 1893
- E. L. Franck Jr. (P) 1895–1897
- R. L. Smith (D) 1899–1900
- F. A. Whitaker (D) 1899—1900
- Henry A. London (D) 1901–1903
- Charles A. Webb (D) 1905–1908
- Whitehead Klutz (D) 1909
- Henry N. Pharr (D) 1911–1913
- Oliver Max Gardner (D) 1915
- Fordyce C. Harding (D) 1917
- Lindsay C. Warren (D) 1919–1920
- William L. Long (D) 1921–1924
- William H. S. Burgwyn (D) 1925
- William L. Long (D) 1927
- Thomas L. Johnson (D) 1929
- Rivers D. Johnson (D) 1931
- William G. Clark (D) 1933
- Paul D. Grady (D) 1935
- Andrew H. Johnston (D) 1937–1938
- James A. Bell (D) 1937–1938
- Whitman E. Smith (D) 1939
- John Davis Larkins Jr. (D) 1941
- John H. Price (D) 1943
- Archie C. Gay (D) 1945
- Joseph L. Blythe (D) 1947
- James C. Pittman (D) 1949
- Rufus G. Rankin (D) 1951
- Edwin Pate (D) 1953
- Paul E. Jones (D) 1955–1956
- Claude Currie (D) 1957
- Robert F. Morgan (D) 1959
- William L. Crew (D) 1961
- Ralph H. Scott (D) 1963
- Robert B. Morgan (D) 1965–1966
- Herman A. Moore (D) 1967
- Neill H. McGeachy (D) 1969
- Frank N. Patterson Jr. (D) 1971
- Gordon P. Allen (D) 1971–1974
- John T. Henley (D) 1975–1978
- W. Craig Lawing (D) 1979–1984
- J. J. Harrington (D) 1985–1988
- Henson P. Barnes (D) 1989–1992
- Marc Basnight (D) 1993–2010
- Phil Berger (R) 2011–present

== See also ==
- Speaker of the North Carolina House of Representatives
- List of North Carolina state legislatures

== Works cited ==
- Cooper, Christopher A.; Knotts, H. Gibbs, eds. (2012). The New Politics of North Carolina. Chapel Hill: University of North Carolina Press. ISBN 9781469606583.
