= Joseph Harvey Wilson =

American politician (1810–1884)

39th President pro tempore of the North Carolina Senate
- In office 1866–1867
- Preceded by: Matthias Manly
- Succeeded by: Post Vacant During Reconstruction; Office of "Speaker" replaced with "President Pro Tempore"; Edward J. Warren

Personal details
- Born: October 7, 1810 Mecklenburg County, North Carolina, US
- Died: September 13, 1884 (aged 73) Mecklenburg County, North Carolina, US
- Party: Whig
- Spouse(s): Julia Adelaide Patton; Mary Louisa Phifer
- Relations: George E. Wilson Jr. (Former Mayor of Charlotte, North Carolina)
- Children: 7
- Profession: Lawyer

Joseph Harvey Wilson (October 7, 1810 – September 13, 1884) was Speaker of the North Carolina Senate from 1866 to 1867, and the final presiding officer to hold the title of "Speaker". He is the grandfather of George Edward Wilson Jr., who served as Mayor of Charlotte from 1929 to 1931.

== Biography ==
Wilson was born in Mecklenburg County, North Carolina in 1810 to parents Mary Erwin Wilson (daughter of Alexander Erwin, a revolutionary soldier and legislator, from Bucks County, Pennsylvania) and Rev. John Makemie Wilson, D.D. a "distinguished Presbyterian minister and a great educator." In fact, Joseph's early education came entirely under his father tutelage until he entered Washington College in Virginia at the age of 13 in the Junior class. Two years later, he graduated with honors at age 15. A few years later, he entered the practice of law in Charlotte and surrounding areas, commencing a highly successful career as a lawyer lasting about fifty years.

He was married twice, first to Julia Adelaide Patton daughter of James Patton Sr., of Buncombe County, on September 25, 1834. They had four children that lived to maturity: James, Harvey, Frank and Anna. In 1846, following Julia's death in 1845, Wilson married his second wife, Mary Louisa Phifer, daughter of George Phifer and Sarah Fulenweilder of Cabarrus County with whom he had two children, George Edward (Father of Charlotte Mayor, George E. Wilson Jr.) and Mary Ellis Wilson.

Prior to the civil war, it was said that he was "earnestly opposed to secession" from the union, and entered politics for the first time in his life, offering himself as a delegate to the convention to defeat secession. However, once the state officially seceded, he "seceded with it, and earnestly, loyally supported the cause she espoused." At the end of the Civil War, Wilson was sent to be a delegate at the Peace Convention.

In 1866, near the height of the Post-Civil War Reconstruction Era, Wilson was asked to join and subsequently lead the North Carolina Senate. However, his term was interrupted the following year by the enactment of military rule over the American southern states. Through multiple successive acts between March and July 1867, the U.S. Congress, split the former confederate states into five military districts, under the jurisdiction of military commanders, with North Carolina placed in the Second Military District, effectively ending the existing state senate. When the Senate was later restored, the office of "Speaker" was replaced by the office of "President pro tempore of the North Carolina Senate", while the Lieutenant Governor became the presiding officer of the Senate.

Wilson died in 1884. In 1904, a memorial window was dedicated to him at the First Presbyterian Church in Charlotte.
