= Gordon P. Allen =

American politician

Gordon Phillip Allen
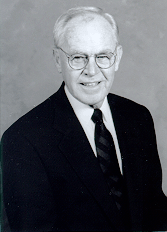

Member of the North Carolina House of Representatives
- In office January 1, 1997 – January 1, 2005
- Preceded by: Michael Satterfield Wilkins
- Succeeded by: Winkie Wilkins
- Constituency: 22nd District (1997–2003); 55th District (2003–2005)

President pro tempore of the North Carolina Senate
- In office January 1, 1971 – January 1, 1975
- Preceded by: Frank Patterson Jr.
- Succeeded by: John Henley

Member of the North Carolina Senate
- In office January 1, 1969 – January 1, 1975
- Preceded by: Daniel Stuart Matheson
- Succeeded by: Willis Padgett Whichard
- Constituency: 11th District (1969–1973); 13th District (1973–1975)

Personal details
- Born: April 29, 1929
- Died: December 23, 2010 (aged 81)
- Party: Democratic
- Education: Mars Hill College (AA)

Gordon Phillip "Joe" Allen (April 29, 1929 – December 23, 2010) was a Democratic member of the North Carolina General Assembly and an insurance professional from Roxboro, North Carolina.

After graduating from Mars Hill College, Allen served in the United States Army during the Korean War and then served in the North Carolina National Guard.

Allen was elected to three terms in the North Carolina Senate, serving from the beginning of 1969 through the end of 1974. In just his second term, Allen rose to the highest rank of Senate leadership when he was elected President Pro Tem and simultaneously Majority Leader. He was re-elected to a second term as Senate leader for the 1973–1974 General Assembly.

After leaving the legislature, Allen spent 20 years lobbying for the N.C. Bankers Association. Then, he was elected to the North Carolina House of Representatives in 1997, serving until 2005. He represented the state's fifty-fifth House district, including constituents in Orange and Person counties.

Allen was also the first chairman of the board of trustees for Piedmont Community College and later received the Order of the Long Leaf Pine in 2010.

He was a father of five children and grandfather of seventeen grandchildren. One granddaughter was named Rachael Gordon after her grandfather.

North Carolina Senate
Preceded by Daniel Stuart Matheson	Member of the North Carolina Senate from the 11th district 1969–1973; Served alongside: Claude Currie	Succeeded by Arthur W. Williamson
Preceded by William Wayne Staton	Member of the North Carolina Senate from the 13th district 1973–1975; Served alongside: Kenneth Claiborne Royall, Jr.	Succeeded by Willis Padgett Whichard
Preceded by Frank Patterson Jr.	President pro tempore of the North Carolina Senate; 1971–1975	Succeeded by John Henley
North Carolina House of Representatives
Preceded by Michael Satterfield Wilkins	Member of the North Carolina House of Representatives from the 22nd district 1997–2003; Served alongside: Jim Crawford	Succeeded by Edd Nye
Preceded by Ed McMahan	Member of the North Carolina House of Representatives from the 55th district 2003–2005	Succeeded by Winkie Wilkins
