= J. J. Harrington =

American politician

Joseph Julian "Monk" Harrington (February 18, 1919 – September 10, 2008) was a member of the North Carolina Senate from 1963 to 1988, representing the 1st District. During his last two terms in office (January 1985 – December 1988), Harrington, a Democrat, served as President pro tempore. He retired from the legislature in 1988 and was succeeded by Frank Ballance.

A lifelong resident of Bertie County, North Carolina, Harrington served in the United States Army during World War II. After playing minor league baseball, he returned home to work for the family farm implements manufacturing business. Before being elected to the legislature, he was a Lewiston town commissioner and a member of Lewiston-Woodville Local School Board. Harrington also served as a trustee of both Chowan College and Elizabeth City State College.

A bridge over the Roanoke River is named for him.

Preceded by W. Craig Lawing	President pro tempore of the North Carolina Senate; 1985–1988	Succeeded by Henson P. Barnes
