= S. Gerald Arnold =

American politician

S. Gerald Arnold (born November 14, 1940) is a North Carolina lawyer and jurist who served as a judge of the North Carolina Court of Appeals, including service as that court's Chief Judge (1992–1998).

Arnold graduated from East Carolina University and the University of North Carolina School of Law, and practiced law with U.S. Sen. Robert B. Morgan. A Democrat, he served two terms in the North Carolina House of Representatives for Harnett and Lee counties, and was the state campaign manager for gubernatorial candidate Hargrove Bowles in 1972. Arnold was elected to the first of several terms on the Court of Appeals in 1974. President Jimmy Carter nominated Arnold to the United States District Court for the Eastern District of North Carolina in 1980, but the U.S. Senate did not act on the nomination before Carter's term expired. He retired from the Court of Appeals in 1998 and went to work for Lawyers Mutual Liability Insurance Co. of North Carolina, retiring as president of the company in 2010. Later that year, he was appointed by North Carolina Attorney General Roy A. Cooper as interim head of the State Bureau of Investigation crime lab, but after accepting, he abruptly changed his mind and declined the post.

North Carolina House of Representatives
Preceded by James Forrest Penny, Jr.	Member of the North Carolina House of Representatives from the 22nd district 1971–1973; Served alongside: Jimmy Lewis Love	Succeeded by William Shakespeare Harris, Jr. James Eugene Long; David M. Blackwell; Homer E. Wright, Jr.
Preceded by George W. Miller Jr. Kenneth Claiborne Royall Jr. Willis Whichard	Member of the North Carolina House of Representatives from the 18th district 1973–1975; Served alongside: Jimmy Lewis Love	Succeeded by Carson Gregory
