= Henson P. Barnes =

American politician from North Carolina

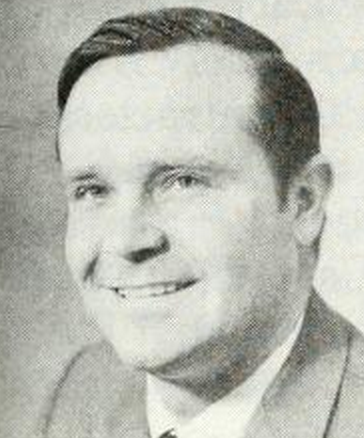

President pro tempore of the North Carolina Senate
- In office January 1, 1989 – January 1, 1993
- Preceded by: J. J. Harrington
- Succeeded by: Marc Basnight

Member of the North Carolina Senate from the 8th district
- In office January 1, 1977 – January 1, 1993
- Preceded by: Thomas Edward Strickland
- Succeeded by: John Kerr III

Member of the North Carolina House of Representatives from the 9th district
- In office January 1, 1975 – January 1, 1977
- Preceded by: William Powell Kemp Jr.
- Succeeded by: Richard Ralph Grady

Personal details
- Born: Henson Perrymoore Barnes; November 18, 1934 Bladen County, North Carolina
- Died: November 22, 2015 (aged 81) Raleigh, North Carolina
- Party: Democratic
- Education: University of North Carolina
- Profession: lawyer

Henson Perrymoore Barnes (November 18, 1934 – November 22, 2015) was an American politician, businessman, and lawyer.

== Political career ==
Barnes served in the North Carolina House of Representatives from 1975 to 1977, and as a member of the North Carolina Senate from 1977 to 1992.

In his last two terms in the Senate (1989 to 1992), Barnes served as President pro tempore. Under Barnes, that position's power increased at the expense of the Lieutenant Governor, who holds the title of President of the Senate. Shortly after his retirement from the Senate, Barnes published a history of the legislature, A Work in Progress: The North Carolina General Assembly (1993).

== Background ==
Following service in the United States Army, Barnes was educated at Wilmington College (now UNC-Wilmington) for two years before earning his bachelor's degree from the University of North Carolina at Chapel Hill and juris doctor degree from the University of North Carolina School of Law. He practiced law in Goldsboro, North Carolina, from 1961 until 1997. He once served as chairman of the Wayne County Democratic Party. After retiring from the senate he moved to White Lake, North Carolina, where he continued to live and operate the family blueberry farm. Barnes died on November 22, 2015, in Raleigh, North Carolina.

North Carolina House of Representatives
Preceded by William Powell Kemp Jr.	Member of the North Carolina House of Representatives from the 9th district 1975–1977; Served alongside: Nancy Winbon Chase	Succeeded by Richard Ralph Grady
North Carolina Senate
Preceded by Thomas Edward Strickland	Member of the North Carolina Senate from the 8th district 1977–1993	Succeeded by John Kerr III
Preceded by J. J. Harrington	President pro tempore of the North Carolina Senate; 1989–1993	Succeeded by Marc Basnight
