= Thomas Gregory Skinner =

American politician

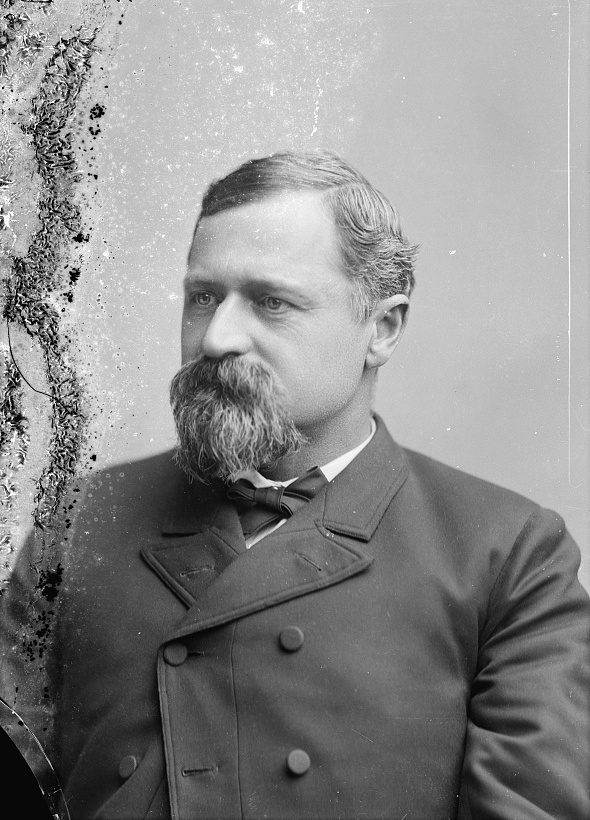
- Library of Congress

Member of the U.S. House of Representatives from North Carolina's 1st district
- In office November 20, 1883 – March 3, 1887
- Preceded by: Walter F. Pool
- Succeeded by: Louis C. Latham
- In office March 4, 1889 – March 3, 1891
- Preceded by: Louis C. Latham
- Succeeded by: William A. B. Branch

Personal details
- Born: January 22, 1842 Hertford, North Carolina, US
- Died: December 22, 1907 (aged 65) Baltimore, Maryland, US
- Party: Democratic

Military service
- Allegiance: Confederate States of America
- Branch/service: Confederate States Army
- Rank: Sergeant
- Unit: Orange Light Infantry; 1st North Carolina Volunteers
- Battles/wars: American Civil War

Thomas Gregory Skinner (January 22, 1842 – December 22, 1907) was a U.S. representative from North Carolina, brother of Harry Skinner.

== Life and career ==
Born near Hertford, North Carolina, Skinner attended private schools: Friends Academy in Belvidere, North Carolina, Horner Military Academy in Oxford, North Carolina, and the University of North Carolina at Chapel Hill. He entered the Confederate States Army in May 1861 and served with the First Regiment, North Carolina Volunteers, until the close of the Civil War, attaining the rank of lieutenant. He studied law, was admitted to the bar in 1868, and commenced practice in Hertford, North Carolina.

Skinner was elected as a Democrat to the Forty-eighth Congress on November 20, 1883, to fill the vacancy caused by the death of Walter F. Pool. He was reelected to the Forty-ninth Congress and served from November 20, 1883, to March 3, 1887.

Skinner was again elected to the Fifty-first Congress (March 4, 1889 – March 3, 1891) but in 1890 declined to be a candidate for renomination to the Fifty-second Congress, and resumed the practice of law in Hertford. He served as delegate to the Democratic National Convention in 1892 and 1904, and as a member of the North Carolina State Senate in 1899 and 1900. He died in Baltimore, Maryland on December 22, 1907, and was interred in Holy Trinity Churchyard, Hertford, North Carolina.

== Sources ==
- United States Congress. "Thomas Gregory Skinner (id: S000470)". Biographical Directory of the United States Congress.

U.S. House of Representatives
Preceded by Walter F. Pool	Member of the U.S. House of Representatives from North Carolina's 1st congressional district 1883–1887	Succeeded by Louis C. Latham
Preceded by Louis C. Latham	Member of the U.S. House of Representatives from North Carolina's 1st congressional district 1889–1891	Succeeded by William A. B. Branch
