= Walter F. Pool =

American politician

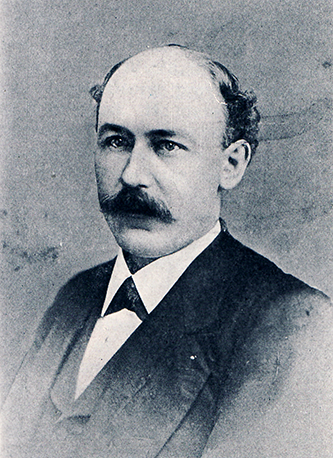
Walter F. Pool

Walter Freshwater Pool (October 10, 1850 – August 25, 1883) was a United States representative from North Carolina.

== Life ==
Pool was born at Elm Grove, near Elizabeth City, Pasquotank County, N.C., October 10, 1850. He was the nephew of John Pool, who was Republican U.S. Senator from North Carolina between 1868 and 1873. He attended the public school conducted by his family and the University of North Carolina at Chapel Hill. In 1870 he moved with his parents to Elizabeth City, N.C. He studied law, was admitted to the bar in 1873 and commenced practice in Elizabeth City.

Pool was elected as a Republican to the 48th United States Congress and served from March 4, 1883, until his death on August 25, 1883, in Elizabeth City (although Congress was not in session at the time). He was interred in the Pool Cemetery, near Elizabeth City.

== See also ==
- List of members of the United States Congress who died in office (1790–1899)

U.S. House of Representatives
Preceded by Louis C. Latham	Member of the U.S. House of Representatives from North Carolina's 1st congressional district 1883	Succeeded by Thomas G. Skinner
