= Alfred Moore Gatlin =

American politician

Alfred Moore Gatlin (April 20, 1790 – February 23, 1841) was a U.S. representative from North Carolina; born in Edenton, North Carolina, April 20, 1790; pursued classical studies at New Bern, North Carolina; graduated from the University of North Carolina at Chapel Hill in 1808. He then worked as a lawyer running his own private practice. He was elected as a Crawford Republican to the Eighteenth Congress (March 4, 1823 – March 3, 1825); unsuccessful candidate for reelection to the Nineteenth Congress in 1824; died on February 23, 1841, in Tallahassee, Florida; interment in St. John's Episcopal Cemetery, Tallahassee, Fla.

== See also ==
- Eighteenth United States Congress

U.S. House of Representatives
Preceded by Lemuel Sawyer	Member of the U.S. House of Representatives from North Carolina's 1st congressional district 1823-1825	Succeeded by Lemuel Sawyer
