= Edwin T. Boykin =

American politician from North Carolina

Edwin Thomas Boykin

Judge for the Sixth Judicial Circuit of the North Carolina Superior Court
- In office 1885 – December 1896
- Preceded by: Allmand A. McKoy
- Succeeded by: Oliver Hicks Harrison Allen

6th President pro tempore of the North Carolina Senate
- In office January 7, 1885 – 1887
- Preceded by: William T. Dortch
- Succeeded by: Edwin W. Kerr

Member of the North Carolina Senate 14th Senatorial District
- In office 1883–1886
- Preceded by: J.A. Oates
- Succeeded by: Edwin W. Kerr

Member of the North Carolina House of Representatives 14th Senatorial District
- In office 1881–1882

Mayor of Clinton, North Carolina

Personal details
- Born: December 27, 1854 Clinton, North Carolina
- Died: August 27, 1898 (aged 43) Dunn, North Carolina
- Spouse(s): Katie G. Bizzell, m. December 28, 1876.
- Children: Arthur Lee Boykin; Edwin Thomas Boykin, Jr.; Swift Galloway Boykin; Celestial Graves Boykin; Isaac Boykin
- Education: Trinity College, 1874

Edwin Thomas Boykin (December 27, 1854 – August 27, 1898) was a North Carolina politician who served in the North Carolina House of Representatives, the North Carolina Senate and as the sixth President pro tempore of the North Carolina Senate.

== Early life ==
Boykin was born December 27, 1854, in Clinton, North Carolina. His father died when he was a youth and his mother moved to the Durham, North Carolina, area.

== Family life ==
Boykin married Katie G. Bizzell on December 28, 1876, they had several children.

== Political career ==
Boykin was twice elected the mayor of Clinton, North Carolina. From 1881 to 1882 Boykin was one of two representatives elected to the North Carolina House of Representatives to represent the Fourteenth Senatorial District. From 1883 to 1886 Boykin served in the North Carolina Senate again representing the fourteenth Senatorial District. On January 7, 1885, Boykin was chosen President pro tempore of the North Carolina Senate by his fellow senators.

== Judicial career ==
In 1885 Boykin was appointed a judge for the Sixth Judicial Circuit of the North Carolina Superior Court to finish the term of Judge Allmand A. McKoy, who had died. In 1886 Boykin was elected to the judgeship on his own right. Boykin resigned December 1896 to resume the practice of law.

== Death ==
Boykin died suddenly on August 27, 1898, after "a stroke of apoplexy". He was buried in Raleigh the next day.

Political offices
| Preceded by William T. Dortch | 6th President pro tempore of the North Carolina Senate; 1885 –1887 | Succeeded by Edwin W. Kerr |
Legal offices
| Preceded by Allmand A. McKoy | Judge for the Sixth Judicial Circuit of the North Carolina Superior Court; 1885 – December 1896 | Succeeded by Oliver Hicks Harrison Allen |
