= North Carolina's 1st congressional district =

U.S. House district for North Carolina

Coordinates: 36.05°N 77.29°W

- Interactive map of district boundaries
- Representative: Don Davis; D–Snow Hill
- Population (2025): 759,400
- Median household income: $60,992
- Ethnicity: 48.1% White; 39.3% Black; 7.6% Hispanic; 3.1% Two or more races; 0.8% Asian; 0.7% Native American; 0.4% other
- Cook PVI: R+5

North Carolina's 1st congressional district is located in the northeastern part of the US state. It consists of many Black Belt counties that border Virginia and it extends southward into several counties of the Inner Banks and the Research Triangle. It covers many rural areas of northeastern North Carolina, among the state's most economically poor, as well as outer exurbs of urbanized Research Triangle. Some of larger towns and cities in the district include Elizabeth City, Goldsboro, Henderson, Rocky Mount, Roanoke Rapids, and Wilson.

The first district is currently represented by Don Davis.

On February 5, 2016, the Fourth Circuit Court of Appeals ruled the 1st district, as well as the 12th, were gerrymandered along racial lines, which was unconstitutional, and must be redrawn by March 15, 2016. It was re-drawn again in 2019 following court-mandated redistricting, which removed portions of the Research Triangle from the district and changed it to D+3 from a D+17 on the Cook Partisan Voting Index.

Besides a brief period from 1895 until 1899 when the district was held by a Populist, the 1st district has been consistently Democratic since 1883.

On February 23, 2022, the North Carolina Supreme Court had approved a new map that was only used for the 2022 United States House of Representatives elections in North Carolina which changed the 1st district boundaries to add Chowan, Currituck, Franklin, Greene, Pasquotank, Perquimans counties and the remainder of Vance County while removing Wayne County.

On October 25, 2023, the North Carolina General Assembly approved a new congressional map shifting the district's Cook Partisan Voting Index from D+2 to R+1. It is the most competitive district in North Carolina. The district was also one of 13 congressional districts that voted for Donald Trump in the 2024 presidential election while simultaneously electing a Democrat in the 2024 House of Representatives elections.

In 2025, the district was once again subject to redistricting, after the North Carolina House and Senate passed a map immune to Democratic governor Josh Stein's veto. The counties of Greene, Lenoir, Wayne, and Wilson were drawn into the new third district, with the counties of Beaufort, Carteret, Craven, Dare, Hyde, and Pamlico now being placed into the first district. The district was considered a likely pickup for Republicans in the 2026 United States House of Representatives elections in North Carolina, but Davis, the incumbent Democratic representative, held the seat.

== Counties and communities ==
For the 120th and successive Congresses (based on the districts drawn following a 2025 legislative session), the district will contain all or portions of the following counties and communities.

Beaufort County (11)

All eleven communities

Bertie County (8)

All eight communities

Camden County (3)

All three communities

Carteret County (18)

All eighteen communities

Craven County (13)

All thirteen communities

Chowan County (4)

All four communities

Currituck County (3)

All three communities

Dare County (15)

All fifteen communities

Edgecombe County (10)

All ten communities

Hyde County (4)

All four communities

Gates County (2)

Gatesville, Sunbury

Granville County (1)

Oxford (part; also 13th

Halifax County (10)

All ten communities

Hertford County (6)

All six communities

Martin County (9)

All nine communities

Nash County (12)

All 12 communities

Northampton County (9)

All nine communities

Onslow County (1)

Swansboro

Pamlico County (10)

All 10 communities

Pasquotank County (1)

Elizabeth City (shared with Camden County)

Perquimans County (2)

Hertford, Winfall

Tyrrell County (1)

Columbia

Vance County (4)

All four communities

Warren County (3)

All three communities

Washington County (3)

All three communities

== Recent election results from statewide races ==
=== 2023–2027 boundaries ===
Year	Office	Results
2008	President	Obama 54% - 45%
2008	Senate	Hagan 57% - 41%
2008	Governor	Perdue 62% - 36%
2010	Senate	Marshall 51% - 48%
2012	President	Obama 55% - 45%
2012	Governor	Dalton 54% - 45%
2014	Senate	Hagan 53% - 45%
2016	President	Clinton 51% - 46%
2016	Senate	Ross 51% - 47%
2016	Governor	Cooper 52% - 47%
2016	Lt. Governor	Coleman 52% - 47%
2016	Secretary of State	Marshall 59% - 41%
2016	Auditor	Wood 57% - 43%
2016	Treasurer	Blue III 54% - 46%
2016	Attorney General	Stein 55% - 45%
2020	President	Biden 50% - 49%
2020	Senate	Cunningham 50% - 47%
2020	Governor	Cooper 53% - 46%
2020	Lt. Governor	Lewis Holley 51% - 49%
2020	Secretary of State	Marshall 54% - 46%
2020	Auditor	Wood 55% - 45%
2020	Treasurer	Chatterji 50.2% - 49.8%
2020	Attorney General	Stein 53% - 47%
2022	Senate	Budd 52% - 46%
2024	President	Trump 51% - 48%
2024	Governor	Stein 53% - 44%
2024	Lt. Governor	Hunt 50% - 48%
2024	Secretary of State	Marshall 52% - 48%
2024	Auditor	Boliek 49.2% - 48.7%
2024	Treasurer	Briner 51% - 49%
2024	Attorney General	Jackson 51% - 49%

=== 2027–2033 boundaries ===
Year	Office	Results
2008	President	Obama 51% - 48%
2008	Senate	Hagan 54% - 44%
2008	Governor	Perdue 61% - 37%
2010	Senate	Burr 52% - 46%
2012	President	Obama 51% - 49%
2012	Governor	McCrory 49.2% - 49.1%
2014	Senate	Hagan 49% - 48%
2016	President	Trump 51% - 46%
2016	Senate	Burr 51% - 46%
2016	Governor	McCrory 51% - 48%
2016	Lt. Governor	Forest 51% - 47%
2016	Secretary of State	Marshall 54% - 46%
2016	Auditor	Wood 53% - 47%
2016	Treasurer	Folwell 51% - 49%
2016	Attorney General	Newton 50.1% - 49.9%
2020	President	Trump 53% - 46%
2020	Senate	Tillis 51% - 45%
2020	Governor	Forest 50% - 49%
2020	Lt. Governor	Robinson 54% - 46%
2020	Secretary of State	Sykes 50.4% - 49.6%
2020	Auditor	Wood 51% - 49%
2020	Treasurer	Folwell 54% - 46%
2020	Attorney General	O'Neill 52% - 48%
2022	Senate	Budd 56% - 42%
2024	President	Trump 55% - 44%
2024	Governor	Stein 49% - 47%
2024	Lt. Governor	Weatherman 52% - 46%
2024	Secretary of State	Brown 52% - 48%
2024	Auditor	Boliek 53% - 44%
2024	Treasurer	Briner 56% - 44%
2024	Attorney General	Bishop 53% - 47%

== List of members representing the district ==
Member (residence)	Party	Years	Cong ress	Electoral history	District location
District established March 24, 1790
John B. Ashe (Halifax)	Anti-Administration	March 24, 1790 – March 3, 1791	1st	Elected in 1790. Redistricted to the 3rd district and re-elected there.	1790–1791; Anson, Burke, Guilford, Iredell, Lincoln, Mecklenburg, Montgomery, Rockingham, Stokes, Surry, Rowan, Rutherford, and Wilkes counties
John Steele (Salisbury)	Pro-Administration	March 4, 1791 – March 3, 1793	2nd	Redistricted from the 4th district and re-elected in 1791. [data missing]	1791–1793; Burke, Guilford, Iredell, Lincoln, Mecklenburg, Montgomery, Rockingham, Stokes, Surry, Rowan, Rutherford, and Wilkes counties
Joseph McDowell (Morganton)	Anti-Administration	March 4, 1793 – March 3, 1795	3rd	Elected in 1793. Lost re-election.	1793–1803; Ashe, Buncombe, Burke, Lincoln, Rutherford, and Wilkes counties
James Holland (Rutherfordton)	Democratic-Republican	March 4, 1795 – March 3, 1797	4th	Elected in 1795. Lost re-election.	1793–1803; Ashe, Buncombe, Burke, Lincoln, Rutherford, and Wilkes counties
Joseph McDowell Jr. (Quaker Meadows)	Democratic-Republican	March 4, 1797 – March 3, 1799	5th	Elected in 1796. Lost re-election.	1793–1803; Ashe, Buncombe, Burke, Lincoln, Rutherford, and Wilkes counties
Joseph Dickson (Lincoln County)	Federalist	March 4, 1799 – March 3, 1801	6th	Elected in 1798. Lost re-election.	1793–1803; Ashe, Buncombe, Burke, Lincoln, Rutherford, and Wilkes counties
James Holland (Rutherfordton)	Democratic-Republican	March 4, 1801 – March 3, 1803	7th	Elected in 1800. Redistricted to the 11th district.	1793–1803; Ashe, Buncombe, Burke, Lincoln, Rutherford, and Wilkes counties
Thomas Wynns (Hertford County)	Democratic-Republican	March 4, 1803 – March 3, 1807	8th 9th	Redistricted from the 8th district and re-elected in 1803. Re-elected in 1804. Retired.	1803–1813; Camden, Chowan, Currituck, Gates, Hertford, Pasquotank, and Perquimans counties
Lemuel Sawyer (Elizabeth City)	Democratic-Republican	March 4, 1807 – March 3, 1813	10th 11th 12th	Elected in 1806. Re-elected in 1808. Re-elected in 1810. Lost re-election.	1803–1813; Camden, Chowan, Currituck, Gates, Hertford, Pasquotank, and Perquimans counties
William H. Murfree (Murfreesboro)	Democratic-Republican	March 4, 1813 – March 3, 1817	13th 14th	Elected in 1813. Re-elected in 1815. Retired.	1813–1823; Camden, Chowan, Currituck, Gates, Hertford, Pasquotank, and Perquimans counties
Lemuel Sawyer (Elizabeth City)	Democratic-Republican	March 4, 1817 – March 3, 1823	15th 16th 17th	Elected in 1817. Re-elected in 1819. Re-elected in 1821. Lost re-election.	1813–1823; Camden, Chowan, Currituck, Gates, Hertford, Pasquotank, and Perquimans counties
Alfred M. Gatlin (Edenton)	Democratic-Republican	March 4, 1823 – March 3, 1825	18th	Elected in 1823. Lost re-election.	1823–1833; Camden, Chowan, Currituck, Gates, Hertford, Pasquotank, and Perquimans counties
Lemuel Sawyer (Elizabeth City)	Jacksonian	March 4, 1825 – March 3, 1829	19th 20th	Elected in 1825. Re-elected in 1827. Lost re-election.	1823–1833; Camden, Chowan, Currituck, Gates, Hertford, Pasquotank, and Perquimans counties
William B. Shepard (Elizabeth City)	Anti-Jacksonian	March 4, 1829 – March 3, 1837	21st 22nd 23rd 24th	Elected in 1829. Re-elected in 1831. Re-elected in 1833. Re-elected in 1835. [data missing]	1823–1833; Camden, Chowan, Currituck, Gates, Hertford, Pasquotank, and Perquimans counties
William B. Shepard (Elizabeth City)	Anti-Jacksonian	March 4, 1829 – March 3, 1837	21st 22nd 23rd 24th	Elected in 1829. Re-elected in 1831. Re-elected in 1833. Re-elected in 1835. [data missing]	1833–1843; Camden, Chowan, Currituck, Gates, Hertford, Pasquotank, and Perquimans counties
Samuel T. Sawyer (Edenton)	Whig	March 4, 1837 – March 3, 1839	25th	Elected in 1837. [data missing]	1833–1843; Camden, Chowan, Currituck, Gates, Hertford, Pasquotank, and Perquimans counties
Kenneth Rayner (Winton)	Whig	March 4, 1839 – March 3, 1843	26th 27th	Elected in 1839. Re-elected in 1841. Redistricted to the 9th district.	1833–1843; Camden, Chowan, Currituck, Gates, Hertford, Pasquotank, and Perquimans counties
Thomas L. Clingman (Asheville)	Whig	March 4, 1843 – March 3, 1845	28th	Elected in 1843. [data missing]	1843–1853; Buncombe, Burke, Caldwell, Cherokee, Cleveland, Haywood, Henderson, Jackson, Macon, Madison, McDowell, Rutherford, and Yancey counties
James Graham (Rutherfordton)	Whig	March 4, 1845 – March 3, 1847	29th	Elected in 1845. [data missing]	1843–1853; Buncombe, Burke, Caldwell, Cherokee, Cleveland, Haywood, Henderson, Jackson, Macon, Madison, McDowell, Rutherford, and Yancey counties
Thomas L. Clingman (Asheville)	Whig	March 4, 1847 – March 3, 1853	30th 31st 32nd	Elected in 1847. Re-elected in 1849. Re-elected in 1851. Redistricted to the 8th district.	1843–1853; Buncombe, Burke, Caldwell, Cherokee, Cleveland, Haywood, Henderson, Jackson, Macon, Madison, McDowell, Rutherford, and Yancey counties
Henry M. Shaw (Indian Town)	Democratic	March 4, 1853 – March 3, 1855	33rd	Elected in 1853. [data missing]	1853–1861; Bertie, Camden, Chowan, Currituck, Gates, Halifax, Hertford, Martin, Northampton, Pasquotank, Perquimans, Tyrrell, and Washington counties
Robert T. Paine (Edenton)	Know Nothing	March 4, 1855 – March 3, 1857	34th	Elected in 1855. [data missing]	1853–1861; Bertie, Camden, Chowan, Currituck, Gates, Halifax, Hertford, Martin, Northampton, Pasquotank, Perquimans, Tyrrell, and Washington counties
Henry M. Shaw (Indian Town)	Democratic	March 4, 1857 – March 3, 1859	35th	Elected in 1857. [data missing]	1853–1861; Bertie, Camden, Chowan, Currituck, Gates, Halifax, Hertford, Martin, Northampton, Pasquotank, Perquimans, Tyrrell, and Washington counties
William N. H. Smith (Murfreesboro)	Opposition	March 4, 1859 – March 3, 1861	36th	Elected in 1859. North Carolina seceded from the Union in May 1861.	1853–1861; Bertie, Camden, Chowan, Currituck, Gates, Halifax, Hertford, Martin, Northampton, Pasquotank, Perquimans, Tyrrell, and Washington counties
Vacant		March 4, 1861 – July 6, 1868	37th 38th 39th 40th	Civil War and Reconstruction	
John R. French (Edenton)	Republican	July 6, 1868 – March 3, 1869	40th	Elected to finish the shorter term. Lost renomination.	1868–1873; Beaufort, Bertie, Camden, Chowan, Currituck, Dare, Gates, Halifax, Hertford, Hyde, Martin, Northampton, Pasquotank, Perquimans, Tyrrell, and Washington counties
Clinton L. Cobb (Elizabeth City)	Republican	March 4, 1869 – March 3, 1875	41st 42nd 43rd	Elected in 1868. Re-elected in 1870. Re-elected in 1872. Lost re-election.	1868–1873; Beaufort, Bertie, Camden, Chowan, Currituck, Dare, Gates, Halifax, Hertford, Hyde, Martin, Northampton, Pasquotank, Perquimans, Tyrrell, and Washington counties
Clinton L. Cobb (Elizabeth City)	Republican	March 4, 1869 – March 3, 1875	41st 42nd 43rd	Elected in 1868. Re-elected in 1870. Re-elected in 1872. Lost re-election.	1873–1883; Beaufort, Bertie, Camden, Chowan, Currituck, Dare, Gates, Hertford, Hyde, Martin, Pamlico, Pasquotank, Perquimans, Pitt, Tyrrell, and Washington counties
Jesse J. Yeates (Murfreesboro)	Democratic	March 4, 1875 – March 3, 1879	44th 45th	Elected in 1874. Re-elected in 1876. Lost re-election, but contested the result.	1873–1883; Beaufort, Bertie, Camden, Chowan, Currituck, Dare, Gates, Hertford, Hyde, Martin, Pamlico, Pasquotank, Perquimans, Pitt, Tyrrell, and Washington counties
Joseph J. Martin (Williamston)	Republican	March 4, 1879 – January 29, 1881	46th	Elected in 1878. Lost contested election before the end of the term.	1873–1883; Beaufort, Bertie, Camden, Chowan, Currituck, Dare, Gates, Hertford, Hyde, Martin, Pamlico, Pasquotank, Perquimans, Pitt, Tyrrell, and Washington counties
Jesse J. Yeates (Murfreesboro)	Democratic	January 29, 1881 – March 3, 1881	46th	Won contested election. Retired.	1873–1883; Beaufort, Bertie, Camden, Chowan, Currituck, Dare, Gates, Hertford, Hyde, Martin, Pamlico, Pasquotank, Perquimans, Pitt, Tyrrell, and Washington counties
Louis C. Latham (Greenville)	Democratic	March 4, 1881 – March 3, 1883	47th	Elected in 1880. Lost re-election.	1873–1883; Beaufort, Bertie, Camden, Chowan, Currituck, Dare, Gates, Hertford, Hyde, Martin, Pamlico, Pasquotank, Perquimans, Pitt, Tyrrell, and Washington counties
Walter F. Pool (Elizabeth)	Republican	March 4, 1883 – August 25, 1883	48th	Elected in 1882. Died.	1883–1893; Beaufort, Camden, Carteret, Chowan, Currituck, Dare, Gates, Hertford, Hyde, Martin, Pamlico, Pasquotank, Perquimans, Pitt, Tyrrell, and Washington counties
Vacant		August 25, 1883 – November 20, 1883	48th		1883–1893; Beaufort, Camden, Carteret, Chowan, Currituck, Dare, Gates, Hertford, Hyde, Martin, Pamlico, Pasquotank, Perquimans, Pitt, Tyrrell, and Washington counties
Thomas G. Skinner (Hertford)	Democratic	November 20, 1883 – March 3, 1887	48th 49th	Elected to finish Pool's term. Re-elected in 1884. Lost renomination.	1883–1893; Beaufort, Camden, Carteret, Chowan, Currituck, Dare, Gates, Hertford, Hyde, Martin, Pamlico, Pasquotank, Perquimans, Pitt, Tyrrell, and Washington counties
Louis C. Latham (Greenville)	Democratic	March 4, 1887 – March 3, 1889	50th	Elected again in 1886. Lost renomination.	1883–1893; Beaufort, Camden, Carteret, Chowan, Currituck, Dare, Gates, Hertford, Hyde, Martin, Pamlico, Pasquotank, Perquimans, Pitt, Tyrrell, and Washington counties
Thomas G. Skinner (Hertford)	Democratic	March 4, 1889 – March 3, 1891	51st	Elected in 1888. Lost renomination.	1883–1893; Beaufort, Camden, Carteret, Chowan, Currituck, Dare, Gates, Hertford, Hyde, Martin, Pamlico, Pasquotank, Perquimans, Pitt, Tyrrell, and Washington counties
William A. B. Branch (Washington)	Democratic	March 4, 1891 – March 3, 1895	52nd 53rd	Elected in 1890. Re-elected in 1892. Lost re-election.	1883–1893; Beaufort, Camden, Carteret, Chowan, Currituck, Dare, Gates, Hertford, Hyde, Martin, Pamlico, Pasquotank, Perquimans, Pitt, Tyrrell, and Washington counties
William A. B. Branch (Washington)	Democratic	March 4, 1891 – March 3, 1895	52nd 53rd	Elected in 1890. Re-elected in 1892. Lost re-election.	1893–1903; Beaufort, Bertie, Camden, Carteret, Chowan, Currituck, Dare, Gates, Hertford, Hyde, Martin, Pamlico, Pasquotank, Perquimans, Pitt, Tyrrell, and Washington counties
Harry Skinner (Greenville)	Populist	March 4, 1895 – March 3, 1899	54th 55th	Elected in 1894. Re-elected in 1896. Lost re-election.	1893–1903; Beaufort, Bertie, Camden, Carteret, Chowan, Currituck, Dare, Gates, Hertford, Hyde, Martin, Pamlico, Pasquotank, Perquimans, Pitt, Tyrrell, and Washington counties
John H. Small (Washington)	Democratic	March 4, 1899 – March 3, 1921	56th 57th 58th 59th 60th 61st 62nd 63rd 64th 65th 66th	Elected in 1898. Re-elected in 1900. Re-elected in 1902. Re-elected in 1904. Re-elected in 1906. Re-elected in 1908. Re-elected in 1910. Re-elected in 1912. Re-elected in 1914. Re-elected in 1916. Re-elected in 1918. Retired.	1893–1903; Beaufort, Bertie, Camden, Carteret, Chowan, Currituck, Dare, Gates, Hertford, Hyde, Martin, Pamlico, Pasquotank, Perquimans, Pitt, Tyrrell, and Washington counties
John H. Small (Washington)	Democratic	March 4, 1899 – March 3, 1921	56th 57th 58th 59th 60th 61st 62nd 63rd 64th 65th 66th	Elected in 1898. Re-elected in 1900. Re-elected in 1902. Re-elected in 1904. Re-elected in 1906. Re-elected in 1908. Re-elected in 1910. Re-elected in 1912. Re-elected in 1914. Re-elected in 1916. Re-elected in 1918. Retired.	1903–1913; Beaufort, Bertie, Camden, Chowan, Currituck, Dare, Gates, Hertford, Hyde, Martin, Pasquotank, Perquimans, Pitt, Tyrrell, and Washington counties
John H. Small (Washington)	Democratic	March 4, 1899 – March 3, 1921	56th 57th 58th 59th 60th 61st 62nd 63rd 64th 65th 66th	Elected in 1898. Re-elected in 1900. Re-elected in 1902. Re-elected in 1904. Re-elected in 1906. Re-elected in 1908. Re-elected in 1910. Re-elected in 1912. Re-elected in 1914. Re-elected in 1916. Re-elected in 1918. Retired.	1913–1933; Beaufort, Bertie, Camden, Chowan, Currituck, Dare, Gates, Hertford, Hyde, Martin, Pasquotank, Perquimans, Pitt, Tyrrell, and Washington counties
Hallett S. Ward (Washington)	Democratic	March 4, 1921 – March 3, 1925	67th 68th	Elected in 1920. Re-elected in 1922. Retired.	1913–1933; Beaufort, Bertie, Camden, Chowan, Currituck, Dare, Gates, Hertford, Hyde, Martin, Pasquotank, Perquimans, Pitt, Tyrrell, and Washington counties
Lindsay C. Warren (Washington)	Democratic	March 4, 1925 – October 31, 1940	69th 70th 71st 72nd 73rd 74th 75th 76th	Elected in 1924. Re-elected in 1926. Re-elected in 1928. Re-elected in 1930. Re-elected in 1932. Re-elected in 1934. Re-elected in 1936. Re-elected in 1938. Resigned to become U.S. Comptroller General.	1913–1933; Beaufort, Bertie, Camden, Chowan, Currituck, Dare, Gates, Hertford, Hyde, Martin, Pasquotank, Perquimans, Pitt, Tyrrell, and Washington counties
Lindsay C. Warren (Washington)	Democratic	March 4, 1925 – October 31, 1940	69th 70th 71st 72nd 73rd 74th 75th 76th	Elected in 1924. Re-elected in 1926. Re-elected in 1928. Re-elected in 1930. Re-elected in 1932. Re-elected in 1934. Re-elected in 1936. Re-elected in 1938. Resigned to become U.S. Comptroller General.	1933–1943; Beaufort, Bertie, Camden, Chowan, Currituck, Dare, Gates, Hertford, Hyde, Martin, Pasquotank, Perquimans, Pitt, Tyrrell, and Washington counties
Vacant		October 31, 1940 – November 5, 1940	76th		1933–1943; Beaufort, Bertie, Camden, Chowan, Currituck, Dare, Gates, Hertford, Hyde, Martin, Pasquotank, Perquimans, Pitt, Tyrrell, and Washington counties
Herbert C. Bonner (Washington)	Democratic	November 5, 1940 – November 7, 1965	76th 77th 78th 79th 80th 81st 82nd 83rd 84th 85th 86th 87th 88th 89th	Elected to finish Warren's term. Re-elected in 1940. Re-elected in 1942. Re-elected in 1944. Re-elected in 1946. Re-elected in 1948. Re-elected in 1950. Re-elected in 1952. Re-elected in 1954. Re-elected in 1956. Re-elected in 1958. Re-elected in 1960. Re-elected in 1962. Re-elected in 1964. Died.	1933–1943; Beaufort, Bertie, Camden, Chowan, Currituck, Dare, Gates, Hertford, Hyde, Martin, Pasquotank, Perquimans, Pitt, Tyrrell, and Washington counties
Herbert C. Bonner (Washington)	Democratic	November 5, 1940 – November 7, 1965	76th 77th 78th 79th 80th 81st 82nd 83rd 84th 85th 86th 87th 88th 89th	Elected to finish Warren's term. Re-elected in 1940. Re-elected in 1942. Re-elected in 1944. Re-elected in 1946. Re-elected in 1948. Re-elected in 1950. Re-elected in 1952. Re-elected in 1954. Re-elected in 1956. Re-elected in 1958. Re-elected in 1960. Re-elected in 1962. Re-elected in 1964. Died.	1943–1953; Beaufort, Bertie, Camden, Chowan, Currituck, Dare, Gates, Hertford, Hyde, Martin, Pasquotank, Perquimans, Pitt, Tyrrell, and Washington counties
Herbert C. Bonner (Washington)	Democratic	November 5, 1940 – November 7, 1965	76th 77th 78th 79th 80th 81st 82nd 83rd 84th 85th 86th 87th 88th 89th	Elected to finish Warren's term. Re-elected in 1940. Re-elected in 1942. Re-elected in 1944. Re-elected in 1946. Re-elected in 1948. Re-elected in 1950. Re-elected in 1952. Re-elected in 1954. Re-elected in 1956. Re-elected in 1958. Re-elected in 1960. Re-elected in 1962. Re-elected in 1964. Died.	1953–1963; Beaufort, Bertie, Camden, Chowan, Currituck, Dare, Gates, Hertford, Hyde, Martin, Pasquotank, Perquimans, Pitt, Tyrrell, and Washington counties
Herbert C. Bonner (Washington)	Democratic	November 5, 1940 – November 7, 1965	76th 77th 78th 79th 80th 81st 82nd 83rd 84th 85th 86th 87th 88th 89th	Elected to finish Warren's term. Re-elected in 1940. Re-elected in 1942. Re-elected in 1944. Re-elected in 1946. Re-elected in 1948. Re-elected in 1950. Re-elected in 1952. Re-elected in 1954. Re-elected in 1956. Re-elected in 1958. Re-elected in 1960. Re-elected in 1962. Re-elected in 1964. Died.	1963–1973; Beaufort, Bertie, Camden, Chowan, Craven, Currituck, Dare, Gates, Hertford, Hyde, Jones, Lenoir, Martin, Pamlico, Pasquotank, Perquimans, Pitt, Tyrrell, and Washington counties
Vacant		November 7, 1965 – February 5, 1966	89th		1963–1973; Beaufort, Bertie, Camden, Chowan, Craven, Currituck, Dare, Gates, Hertford, Hyde, Jones, Lenoir, Martin, Pamlico, Pasquotank, Perquimans, Pitt, Tyrrell, and Washington counties
Walter B. Jones Sr. (Farmville)	Democratic	February 5, 1966 – September 15, 1992	89th 90th 91st 92nd 93rd 94th 95th 96th 97th 98th 99th 100th 101st 102nd	Elected to finish Bonner's term. Re-elected in 1966. Re-elected in 1968. Re-elected in 1970. Re-elected in 1972. Re-elected in 1974. Re-elected in 1976. Re-elected in 1978. Re-elected in 1980. Re-elected in 1982. Re-elected in 1984. Re-elected in 1986. Re-elected in 1988. Re-elected in 1990. Died.	1963–1973; Beaufort, Bertie, Camden, Chowan, Craven, Currituck, Dare, Gates, Hertford, Hyde, Jones, Lenoir, Martin, Pamlico, Pasquotank, Perquimans, Pitt, Tyrrell, and Washington counties
Walter B. Jones Sr. (Farmville)	Democratic	February 5, 1966 – September 15, 1992	89th 90th 91st 92nd 93rd 94th 95th 96th 97th 98th 99th 100th 101st 102nd	Elected to finish Bonner's term. Re-elected in 1966. Re-elected in 1968. Re-elected in 1970. Re-elected in 1972. Re-elected in 1974. Re-elected in 1976. Re-elected in 1978. Re-elected in 1980. Re-elected in 1982. Re-elected in 1984. Re-elected in 1986. Re-elected in 1988. Re-elected in 1990. Died.	1973–1983 [data missing]
Walter B. Jones Sr. (Farmville)	Democratic	February 5, 1966 – September 15, 1992	89th 90th 91st 92nd 93rd 94th 95th 96th 97th 98th 99th 100th 101st 102nd	Elected to finish Bonner's term. Re-elected in 1966. Re-elected in 1968. Re-elected in 1970. Re-elected in 1972. Re-elected in 1974. Re-elected in 1976. Re-elected in 1978. Re-elected in 1980. Re-elected in 1982. Re-elected in 1984. Re-elected in 1986. Re-elected in 1988. Re-elected in 1990. Died.	1983–1993 [data missing]
Vacant		September 15, 1992 – November 3, 1992	102nd		1983–1993 [data missing]
Eva Clayton (Littleton)	Democratic	November 3, 1992 – January 3, 2003	102nd 103rd 104th 105th 106th 107th	Elected to finish Jones's term. Elected to full term in 1992. Re-elected in 1994. Re-elected in 1996. Re-elected in 1998. Re-elected in 2000. Retired.	1983–1993 [data missing]
Eva Clayton (Littleton)	Democratic	November 3, 1992 – January 3, 2003	102nd 103rd 104th 105th 106th 107th	Elected to finish Jones's term. Elected to full term in 1992. Re-elected in 1994. Re-elected in 1996. Re-elected in 1998. Re-elected in 2000. Retired.	1993–2003 [data missing]
Frank Ballance (Warrenton)	Democratic	January 3, 2003 – June 11, 2004	108th	Elected in 2002. Resigned.	2003–2013
Vacant		June 11, 2004 – July 20, 2004	108th		2003–2013
G. K. Butterfield (Wilson)	Democratic	July 20, 2004 – December 30, 2022	108th 109th 110th 111th 112th 113th 114th 115th 116th 117th	Elected to finish Ballance's term. Re-elected later in 2004. Re-elected in 2006. Re-elected in 2008. Re-elected in 2010. Re-elected in 2012. Re-elected in 2014. Re-elected in 2016. Re-elected in 2018. Re-elected in 2020. Resigned.	2003–2013
G. K. Butterfield (Wilson)	Democratic	July 20, 2004 – December 30, 2022	108th 109th 110th 111th 112th 113th 114th 115th 116th 117th	Elected to finish Ballance's term. Re-elected later in 2004. Re-elected in 2006. Re-elected in 2008. Re-elected in 2010. Re-elected in 2012. Re-elected in 2014. Re-elected in 2016. Re-elected in 2018. Re-elected in 2020. Resigned.	2013–2017
G. K. Butterfield (Wilson)	Democratic	July 20, 2004 – December 30, 2022	108th 109th 110th 111th 112th 113th 114th 115th 116th 117th	Elected to finish Ballance's term. Re-elected later in 2004. Re-elected in 2006. Re-elected in 2008. Re-elected in 2010. Re-elected in 2012. Re-elected in 2014. Re-elected in 2016. Re-elected in 2018. Re-elected in 2020. Resigned.	2017–2021
G. K. Butterfield (Wilson)	Democratic	July 20, 2004 – December 30, 2022	108th 109th 110th 111th 112th 113th 114th 115th 116th 117th	Elected to finish Ballance's term. Re-elected later in 2004. Re-elected in 2006. Re-elected in 2008. Re-elected in 2010. Re-elected in 2012. Re-elected in 2014. Re-elected in 2016. Re-elected in 2018. Re-elected in 2020. Resigned.	2021–2023
Vacant		December 30, 2022 – January 3, 2023	117th		2021–2023
Don Davis (Snow Hill)	Democratic	January 3, 2023 – present	118th 119th	Elected in 2022. Re-elected in 2024. Re-elected in 2026.	2023–2025
Don Davis (Snow Hill)	Democratic	January 3, 2023 – present	118th 119th	Elected in 2022. Re-elected in 2024. Re-elected in 2026.	2025–2027
Don Davis (Snow Hill)	Democratic	January 3, 2023 – present	118th 119th	Elected in 2022. Re-elected in 2024. Re-elected in 2026.	2027–present

== Past election results ==
=== 2000 ===
2000 North Carolina's 1st congressional district election
Party	Candidate	Votes	%
Democratic	Eva Clayton (incumbent)	124,171	65.6
Republican	Duane Kratzer Jr.	62,198	32.9
Libertarian	Christopher Delaney	2,799	1.5
Total votes		189,168	100
Democratic hold			

=== 2002 ===
2002 North Carolina's 1st congressional district election
Party	Candidate	Votes	%
Democratic	Frank Ballance	93,157	63.74
Republican	Greg Dority	50,907	34.83
Libertarian	Mike Ruff	2,093	1.43
Total votes		146,157	100
Democratic hold			

=== 2004 ===
2004 North Carolina's 1st congressional district election
Party	Candidate	Votes	%
Democratic	G. K. Butterfield	137,667	63.98
Republican	Greg Dority	77,508	36.02
Total votes		215,175	100
Democratic hold			

=== 2006 ===
2006 North Carolina's 1st congressional district election
Party	Candidate	Votes	%
Democratic	G. K. Butterfield (incumbent)	82,510	100
Total votes		82,510	100
Democratic hold			

=== 2008 ===
2008 North Carolina's 1st congressional district election
Party	Candidate	Votes	%
Democratic	G. K. Butterfield (incumbent)	192,765	70.28
Republican	Dean Stephens	81,506	29.72
Total votes		274,271	100
Democratic hold			

=== 2010 ===
2010 North Carolina's 1st congressional district election
Party	Candidate	Votes	%
Democratic	G. K. Butterfield (incumbent)	103,294	59.31
Republican	Ashley Woolard	70,867	40.69
Total votes		174,161	100
Democratic hold			

=== 2012 ===
2012 North Carolina's 1st congressional district election
Party	Candidate	Votes	%
Democratic	G. K. Butterfield (incumbent)	254,644	75.32
Republican	Pete DiLauro	77,288	22.86
Libertarian	Darryl Holloman	6,134	1.81
Total votes		338,066	99.9
Democratic hold			

=== 2014 ===
2014 North Carolina's 1st congressional district election
Party	Candidate	Votes	%
Democratic	G. K. Butterfield (incumbent)	154,333	73.38
Republican	Arthur Rich	55,990	26.62
Total votes		210,323	100
Democratic hold			

=== 2016 ===
2016 North Carolina's 1st congressional district election
Party	Candidate	Votes	%
Democratic	G. K. Butterfield (incumbent)	240,661	68.62
Republican	H. Powell Dew Jr.	101,567	28.96
Libertarian	Joseph John Summerell	8,259	2.4
Total votes		346,830	99.98
Democratic hold			

=== 2018 ===
2018 North Carolina's 1st congressional district election
Party	Candidate	Votes	%
Democratic	G. K. Butterfield (incumbent)	190,457	69.9
Republican	Roger Allison	82,218	30.2
Total votes		272,675	100.0
Democratic hold			

=== 2020 ===
2020 North Carolina's 1st congressional district election
Party	Candidate	Votes	%
Democratic	G. K. Butterfield (incumbent)	188,870	54.2
Republican	Sandy Smith	159,758	45.8
Total votes		348,618	100.0
Democratic hold			

=== 2022 ===
2022 North Carolina's 1st congressional district election
Party	Candidate	Votes	%
Democratic	Don Davis	134,996	52.4
Republican	Sandy Smith	122,780	47.6
Total votes		257,776	100.0
Democratic hold			

=== 2024 ===
2024 North Carolina's 1st congressional district election
Party	Candidate	Votes	%
Democratic	Don Davis (incumbent)	186,341	49.5
Republican	Laurie Buckhout	180,034	47.8
Libertarian	Tom Bailey	9,949	2.6
Total votes		376,324	100.0
Democratic hold			

== See also ==
- List of United States congressional districts
- North Carolina's congressional districts
