= Harry Skinner (politician) =

American politician

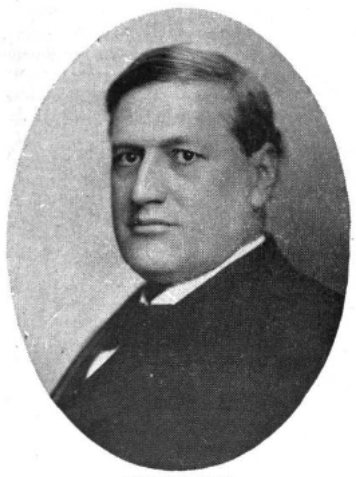

Member of the U.S. House of Representatives from 's North Carolina's 1st district
- In office March 4, 1895 – March 3, 1899
- Preceded by: William A.B. Branch
- Succeeded by: John H. Small

Personal details
- Born: May 25, 1855 Perquimans County, North Carolina
- Died: May 19, 1929 (aged 73) Greenville, North Carolina
- Resting place: Cherry Hill Cemetery
- Party: Democratic; Populist
- Spouses: Lottie Montiero (m. 1878) Ella Montiero (m. 1895)
- Relatives: Thomas Gregory Skinner (brother)
- Education: Hertford Academy; University of Kentucky College of Law
- Occupation: Lawyer, politician

Harry Skinner (May 25, 1855 – May 19, 1929) was an American lawyer and politician who served two terms as a U.S. representative from North Carolina from 1895 to 1899’

He was the brother of U.S. Representative Thomas Gregory Skinner.

== Early life and education ==
Skinner was born in Perquimans County, North Carolina, near Hertford, on May 25, 1855. He was a member of a wealthy political family; his father, James C. Skinner, was a state senator and clerk of the county court, and his grandfather, also named Harry Skinner, had served in both houses of the North Carolina legislature.

He attended Hertford Academy and was graduated from the University of Kentucky College of Law at Lexington. He was admitted to the bar in 1876 and commenced practice in Greenville, North Carolina.

== Political career ==
He served on the town council in 1878 before joining Governor Jarvis' staff and serving as aide-de-camp (1879–1886). He chaired the Democratic executive committees of the First Congressional District (1880–1890) and of Pitt County (1880–1892). In 1891 and 1892 he was a member of the State house of representatives. He chaired the Populist executive committee of Pitt County (1892–1896).

He was a member of the State central committee (1892–1896) and a trustee of the University of North Carolina at Chapel Hill (1890–1896).

== Family ==
He married Lottie Montiero on June 5, 1878, and they had six children. He remarried to Ella Montiero on October 26, 1895, and they had one child.

== Congress ==
Skinner was elected as a Populist to the Fifty-fourth and Fifty-fifth Congresses (March 4, 1895 – March 3, 1899), but in 1898 was unsuccessful in his bid for reelection to the Fifty-sixth Congress.

== Later career and death ==
He served as United States attorney for the eastern district of North Carolina (1902–1910), after which he resumed the practice of law in Greenville, where he died on May 19, 1929.

He was interred in Cherry Hill Cemetery.

== Religion ==
Skinner and his family were early supporters of the fledgling Roman Catholic community in Greenville, North Carolina. The family home served as a gathering place for saying the Mass, and after his Skinner's death, the family home was converted into a convent for the Society of Christ Our King founded by his daughter, Sister Mary Josephy (born Mary Lavinia "Winnie" Skinner, 1878-1973) and his second wife, Ella Montiero Skinner (1866-1937). Land donated by the family would eventually be the site for Saint Peter Catholic Church.

U.S. House of Representatives
Preceded by William A. B. Branch	Member of the U.S. House of Representatives from North Carolina's 1st congressional district 1895–1899	Succeeded by John H. Small
Legal offices
Preceded by Claude M. Bernard	United States Attorney for the Eastern District of North Carolina; 1902–1910	Succeeded by Herbert F. Seawell
