= Lemuel Sawyer =

American politician (1777–1852)

Member of the U.S. House of Representatives from North Carolina's 1st district
- In office March 4, 1825 – March 3, 1829
- Preceded by: Alfred Moore Gatlin
- Succeeded by: William Biddle Shepard
- In office March 4, 1817 – March 3, 1823
- Preceded by: William H. Murfree
- Succeeded by: Alfred Moore Gatlin
- In office March 4, 1807 – March 3, 1813
- Preceded by: Thomas Wynns
- Succeeded by: William H. Murfree

Personal details
- Born: 1777 Camden County, North Carolina
- Died: January 9, 1852 (aged 74–75) Washington, D.C.
- Party: Democratic-Republican
- Education: University of North Carolina at Chapel Hill

Lemuel Sawyer (1777 – January 9, 1852) was an American politician who served as a U.S. representative from North Carolina.

Sawyer was born in Camden County, near Elizabeth City, North Carolina. He attended Flatbush Academy, Long Island, New York, and was graduated from the University of North Carolina at Chapel Hill in 1799. He attended the University of Pennsylvania at Philadelphia for a time. He studied law and was admitted to the bar in 1804. He then commenced practice in Elizabeth City, North Carolina.

Sawyer was a member of the State House of Commons in 1800 and 1801. He was elected to the Tenth, Eleventh, and Twelfth Congresses (March 4, 1807 – March 3, 1813) as a Democratic-Republican, and the Fifteenth, Sixteenth, and Seventeenth as a Jacksonian (March 4, 1817 – March 3, 1823). He ran unsuccessfully in 1822 for the Eighteenth Congress. Sawyer was elected to the Nineteenth and Twentieth Congresses (March 4, 1825 – March 3, 1829), but was not reelected in 1828 to the Twenty-first Congress. He was department clerk in Washington, D.C., until his death in that city.

He was interred in the family burying ground at Lambs Ferry, Camden County, North Carolina, about 4 miles (6.4 km) from Elizabeth City, North Carolina.

U.S. House of Representatives
Preceded by Thomas Wynns	Member of the U.S. House of Representatives from North Carolina's 1st congressional district March 4, 1807 – March 3, 1813	Succeeded by William H. Murfree
Preceded by William H. Murfree	Member of the U.S. House of Representatives from North Carolina's 1st congressional district March 4, 1817 – March 3, 1823	Succeeded by Alfred M. Gatlin
Preceded by Alfred M. Gatlin	Member of the U.S. House of Representatives from North Carolina's 1st congressional district March 4, 1825 – March 3, 1829	Succeeded by William B. Shepard
