= Louis C. Latham =

American politician

Louis Charles Latham
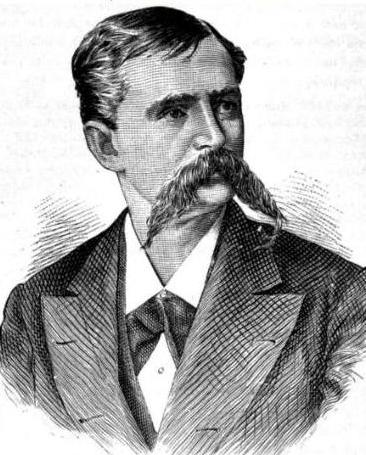

Member of the U.S. House of Representatives from North Carolina's 1st district
- In office March 4, 1881 – March 3, 1883
- Preceded by: Jesse J. Yeates
- Succeeded by: Walter F. Pool
- In office March 4, 1887 – March 3, 1889
- Preceded by: Thomas G. Skinner
- Succeeded by: Thomas G. Skinner

Member of the North Carolina House of Commons
- In office 1864

Member of the North Carolina Senate
- In office 1870

Personal details
- Born: September 11, 1840 Plymouth, North Carolina, US
- Died: October 16, 1895 (aged 55) Baltimore, Maryland, US
- Party: Democratic
- Education: University of North Carolina
- Occupation: Lawyer

Military service
- Allegiance: Confederate States
- Branch/service: Confederate States Army
- Years of service: 1861–1865
- Rank: Major
- Unit: 1st North Carolina State Troops
- Battles/wars: American Civil War

Louis Charles Latham (September 11, 1840, Plymouth, North Carolina – October 16, 1895 Baltimore, Maryland) was a member of the United States House of Representatives representing North Carolina.

== Biography ==
Latham graduated from the University of North Carolina at Chapel Hill in 1859 and later attended the Harvard Law School. He entered the Confederate Army in 1861 where he was commissioned captain and afterward major of the First Regiment of North Carolina State troops, and served throughout the American Civil War. Following the war he resumed the study of law, was admitted to the bar in 1868 and commenced practice in Plymouth, N.C.

He was elected member of the North Carolina House of Commons in 1864 and to the North Carolina State Senate in 1870. He was elected as a Democrat to the Forty-seventh Congress (March 4, 1881 – March 3, 1883); unsuccessful candidate for renomination in 1882; elected to the Fiftieth Congress (March 4, 1887 – March 3, 1889); unsuccessful candidate for reelection in 1888 to the Fifty-first United States Congress.

He resumed the practice of law in Greenville, North Carolina and died at Johns Hopkins University Hospital in Baltimore, Maryland on October 16, 1895. He was interred in Greenville's City Cemetery.

U.S. House of Representatives
Preceded by Jesse J. Yeates	Member of the U.S. House of Representatives from North Carolina's 1st congressional district 1881–1883	Succeeded by Walter F. Pool
Preceded by Thomas G. Skinner	Member of the U.S. House of Representatives from North Carolina's 1st congressional district 1887–1889	Succeeded by Thomas G. Skinner
