= Herbert Covington Bonner =

American politician

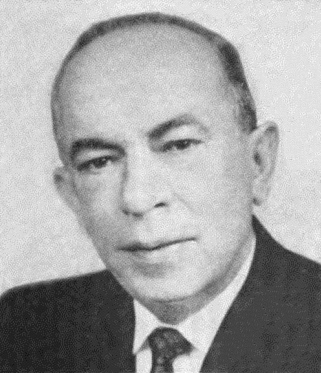

Member of the U.S. House of Representatives from North Carolina's 1st district
- In office November 5, 1940 – November 7, 1965
- Preceded by: Lindsay Carter Warren
- Succeeded by: Walter B. Jones Sr.

Personal details
- Born: May 16, 1891 Washington, North Carolina, U.S.
- Died: November 7, 1965 (aged 74) Washington, D.C., U.S.
- Party: Democratic

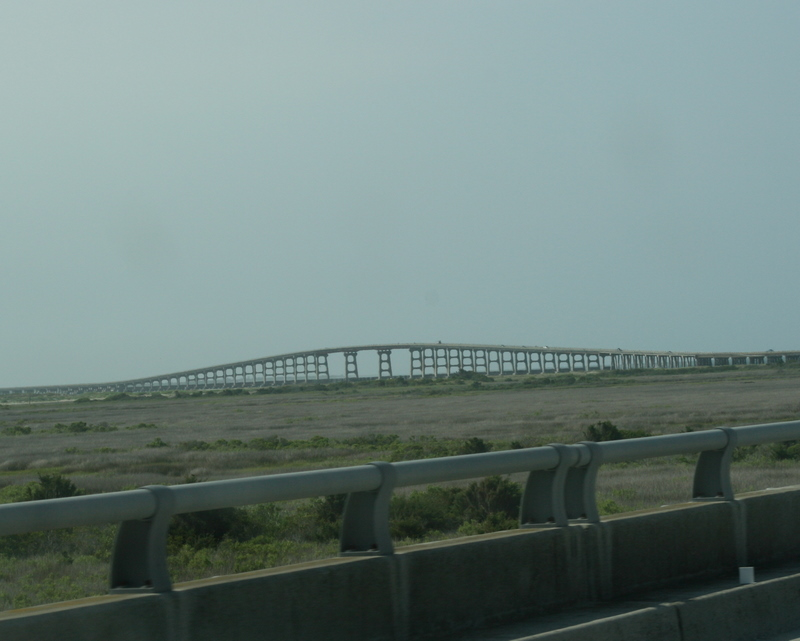
Bonner Bridge over Oregon Inlet

Herbert Covington Bonner (May 16, 1891 – November 7, 1965) was a Democratic U.S. congressman from North Carolina between 1940 and 1965.

Born in Washington, North Carolina, Bonner attended school in Warrenton. He served in the United States Army during World War I, and worked as a salesman, a farmer, and then as secretary to Congressman Lindsay Warren from 1924 to 1940.

Upon Warren's resignation from Congress in 1940, Bonner was elected simultaneously to complete the unexpired term, and was elected to the 77th Congress for a full term. He served for twelve full terms, from November 5, 1940, until his death from cancer in Washington, D.C., on November 7, 1965. During the 79th Congress, he chaired the Committee on Election of President, Vice President, and Representatives in Congress, and in the 84th through 89th Congresses, he chaired the Committee on Merchant Marine and Fisheries.

Bonner was sometimes regarded (as noted by one observer) as “the most liberal Democrat in the state’s congressional delegation.”

Bonner died in office in 1965 in Washington, D.C.; he is buried in Washington, D.C.

== Legacy ==
A former bridge spanning Oregon Inlet on the Outer Banks was named in honor of him and his service to the state of North Carolina. When the bridge was replaced in 2019, 1,000 ft of the Bonner bridge was left to be used a pier and retains the Bonner name.

The M/V Herbert C. Bonner, a 25 car ferry was also named for him. The 112 ft. vessel was built in 1970 for the North Carolina Department of Transportation Ferry Division to cross Hatteras Inlet between Hatteras and Ocracoke Islands on the outer banks of North Carolina. The ferry was taken out of service and sold by NCDOT. The Bonner was purchased by A&R Marine and now operates on Narragansett Bay where it crosses between Bristol and Prudence Island.

Bonner was the namesake of the former Herbert C. Bonner Scout Reservation, commonly known as "Camp Bonner", located near Washington, North Carolina. This is now known as the East Carolina Scout Reservation composed of Camp Boddie and the Pamlico Seabase. The portion of the camp on the North side on the Pamlico River still bears the name Camp Bonner and is the regular site of the council camporee for the East Carolina Council of the Boy Scouts of America.

== See also ==
- List of members of the United States Congress who died in office (1950–1999)
- List of members of the House Un-American Activities Committee

U.S. House of Representatives
Preceded by Lindsay Carter Warren	Member of the U.S. House of Representatives from North Carolina's 1st congressional district 1940–1965	Succeeded by Walter B. Jones Sr.
Political offices
Preceded by Alvin F. Weichel; Ohio	Chairman of House Merchant Marine and Fisheries Committee; 1955–1965	Succeeded by Edward Garmatz; Maryland
