= Hallett Sydney Ward =

American politician

Hallett Sydney Ward (August 31, 1870 – March 31, 1956) was a Democratic U.S. Congressman from North Carolina between 1921 and 1925.

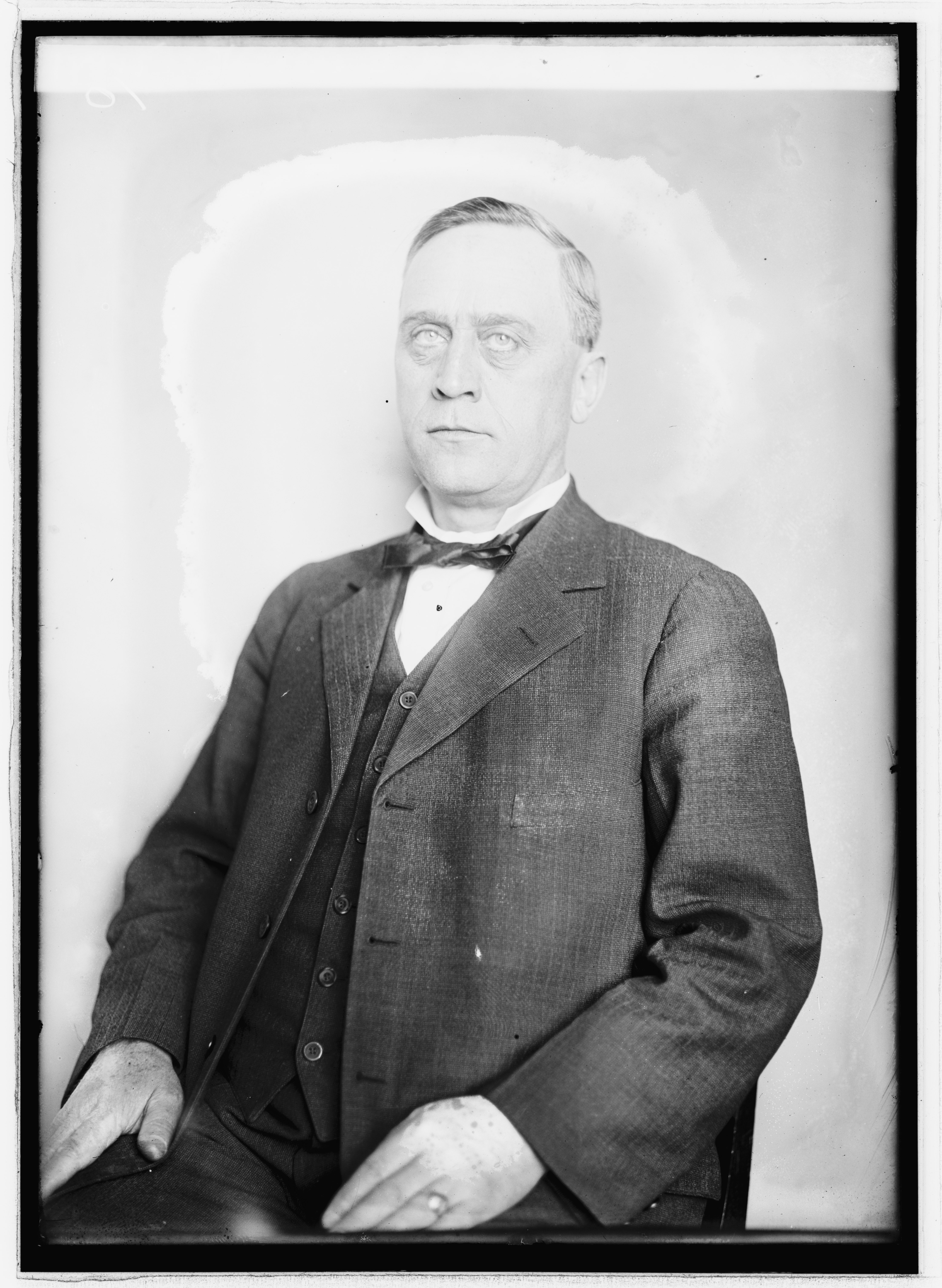

Born near Gatesville, North Carolina, Ward attended public schools in Gates County and then studied law at the University of North Carolina at Chapel Hill. He graduated and was admitted to the bar in 1893, beginning his law practice in Winton, North Carolina.

Ward was first elected to the North Carolina Senate in 1899 and was sent back for a second term in 1901. He served as mayor of the town of Plymouth, North Carolina from 1902 to 1903. In 1904, moved to the town of Washington, North Carolina, where he was named solicitor for the first judicial district of North Carolina, a post he held until 1910.

In 1920, Ward was elected to the 67th United States Congress; he would serve two terms in Washington, DC before declining renomination in 1924, after which he returned to his law practice in North Carolina. He served one additional term in the North Carolina Senate in 1931, and died in Washington, North Carolina in 1956.

U.S. House of Representatives
Preceded by John H. Small	Member of the U.S. House of Representatives from North Carolina's 1st congressional district 1921–1925	Succeeded by Lindsay C. Warren
