= Allmand A. McKoy =

American lawyer

Allmand Alexander McKoy

Judge of the North Carolina Superior Court
- In office 1875 – November 11, 1885
- Succeeded by: Edwin T. Boykin

Delegate to the North Carolina Constitutional Convention
- In office 1865–1866

Member of the North Carolina North Carolina Senate
- In office 1858–1859

Personal details
- Born: October 11, 1825 Clinton, North Carolina
- Died: November 11, 1885 (aged 60) Clinton, North Carolina
- Resting place: Clinton Cemetery
- Party: Democratic
- Spouse: Lydia A. Howard
- Children: Thomas Hall McKoy; Susan Howard McKoy; Ann McKoy; Carrie McKoy; John McKoy;
- Education: University of North Carolina

Military service
- Allegiance: Confederate States of America
- Rank: Colonel, Lieutenant Colonel
- Commands: 24th Regiment, North Carolina Militia; 27th Battalion North Carolina Home Guards; 8th North Carolina Senior Reserves
- Battles/wars: American Civil War

Allmand Alexander McKoy (Roberto 11, 1825 – November 11, 1885) was a North Carolina lawyer, military officer and Democratic party politician who served in the North Carolina Senate and as a judge of the Superior Court of North Carolina.

== Early life ==
McKoy was born on October 11, 1825, to Dr. William and Ann Hall McKoy in Clinton, North Carolina.

== Family life ==
McKoy married Lydia Anciaux Howard. They had five children, two who lived to adulthood Thomas Hall McKoy, Susan Howard McKoy, and three who died as children, Ann McKoy, Carrie McKoy, John McKoy.

== Education ==
McKoy attended the University of North Carolina.

== Political career ==
From 1858 to 1859 McKoy served in the North Carolina Senate.

== Civil War and military service ==
During the Civil War McKoy was, under the Sequestration law, a receiver for the Confederate Government. McKoy joined the North Carolina Militia on February 15, 1861, serving as a colonel in the 24th Regiment, North Carolina Militia. From 1863 to 1864 McKoy was a lieutenant colonel in the 27th Battalion North Carolina Home Guards. On December 22, 1864, McKoy was appointed a colonel in the 8th North Carolina Senior Reserves.

== Post war careers ==
=== Business career ===
After the American Civil War McKoy practiced law in Clinton, North Carolina.

=== Political career ===
McKoy was a delegate to the North Carolina Constitutional Convention of 1865–1866. McKoy was an unsuccessful candidate for the U.S. Congress in 1868 losing to Republican Oliver H. Dockery. From 1874 to 1875 he was a Judge of the North Carolina Superior Court.

== Death and burial ==
McKoy died in Clinton, North Carolina, on November 11, 1885, and he was buried in the Clinton cemetery.

Legal offices
Preceded by	Judge of the North Carolina Superior Court; 1874–November 11, 1885	Succeeded by Edwin T. Boykin
