= John Humphrey Small =

American politician

John H. Small
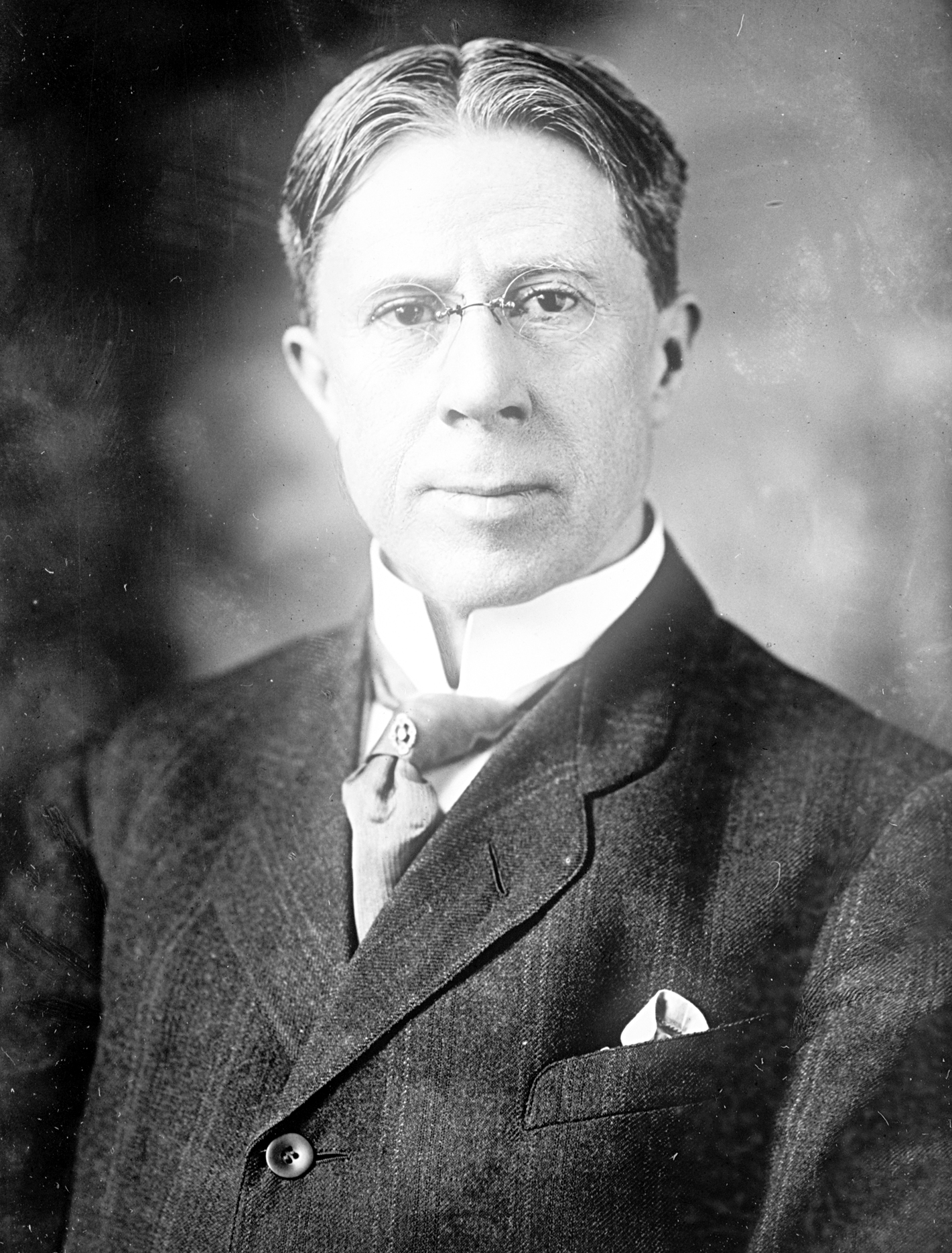

Member of the U.S. House of Representatives from North Carolina's 1st district
- In office March 4, 1899 – March 3, 1921
- Preceded by: Harry Skinner
- Succeeded by: Hallett S. Ward

Personal details
- Born: John Humphrey Small; August 29, 1858 Washington, North Carolina
- Died: July 13, 1946 (aged 87) Washington, North Carolina
- Resting place: Oakdale Cemetery
- Party: Democratic
- Education: Trinity College (Duke University)
- Occupation: Attorney
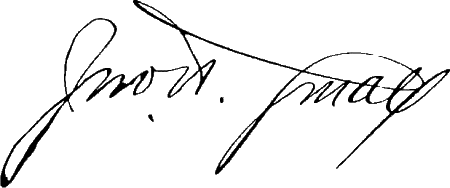
- Signature

John Humphrey Small (August 29, 1858 – July 13, 1946) was an American attorney and politician who served eleven terms as a U.S. representative from North Carolina from 1899 to 1921.

== Early life and education ==
Born in Washington, North Carolina, Small attended private schools and Trinity College (later Duke University), Durham, North Carolina, where he was a member of Chi Phi fraternity. He taught school from 1876 to 1880 and studied law as a legal apprentice. He was admitted to the bar in 1881.

== Career ==
Small started a legal practice in his hometown of Washington, North Carolina. Small was elected a reading clerk of the North Carolina State Senate in 1881, the year he was admitted to the bar. That year he was also appointed as superintendent of public instruction of Beaufort County.

He was elected as solicitor of the inferior court of Beaufort County 1882–1885. At the time, he also became editor of the Washington Gazette, serving from 1883 to 1886. He was appointed as attorney of the Board of Commissioners of Beaufort County, serving from 1888 to 1896.

At the same time, Small was elected as a member of the Washington city council 1887–1890. He served as mayor of Washington in 1889 and 1890 (the position rotated among the city council members).

Active in the Democratic Party, Small served as delegate to all Democratic State conventions from 1889 to 1920.

=== Congress ===
Small was elected as a Democrat to the Fifty-sixth and to the ten succeeding Congresses (March 4, 1899 – March 3, 1921) from North Carolina's 1st congressional district. He served as chairman of the Committee on Rivers and Harbors (Sixty-fifth Congress).

== Later career ==
He declined to be a candidate for renomination in 1920 and retired from political office. Staying in Washington, D.C., he revived his legal practice there until 1931.

== Retirement and death ==
Small returned to Washington, where he died on July 13, 1946. He was interred in Oakdale Cemetery.

He inherited Rosedale Plantation and it was listed on the National Register of Historic Places in 1982.

== Sources ==
- United States Congress. "John Humphrey Small (id: S000500)". Biographical Directory of the United States Congress.

U.S. House of Representatives
Preceded by Harry Skinner	Member of the U.S. House of Representatives from North Carolina's 1st congressional district 1899–1921	Succeeded by Hallett S. Ward
