= Frank N. Patterson Jr. =

American politician

President pro tempore of the North Carolina Senate
- In office 1971–1971
- Preceded by: Neill H. McGeachy
- Succeeded by: Gordon P. Allen

Member of the North Carolina Senate

Member of the North Carolina House of Representatives

Personal details
- Born: March 11, 1917
- Died: July 31, 1971 (aged 54)

Frank Neville Patterson Jr. (March 11, 1917 – July 31, 1971) was a North Carolina politician who served in both houses of the North Carolina General Assembly.

A graduate of the University of North Carolina School of Law, Patterson, a Democrat, was an attorney and local judge in Stanly County. He was elected to one term in the North Carolina House of Representatives in 1958 and later to two terms in the North Carolina Senate in 1968 and 1970. He was elected Senate President Pro Tempore in 1971 but his tenure was short-lived, as he died later that year. Senators selected Gordon P. Allen to succeed him as Senate leader.

Political offices
Preceded by Neill H. McGeachy	President pro tempore of the North Carolina Senate; 1971 – 1971	Succeeded by Gordon P. Allen
