= William A. B. Branch =

American politician

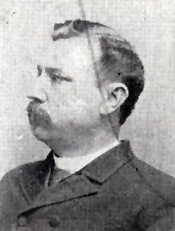
William Augustus Blount Branch

William Augustus Blount Branch (February 26, 1847 in Tallahassee, Florida – November 18, 1910 in Washington, N.C.), was a U.S. representative from North Carolina.

Branch was a son of Lawrence O'Bryan Branch and great-nephew of John Branch. He moved with his father to Raleigh, N.C., in 1852. He attended Lovejoy's Academy in Raleigh, N.C., Bingham Military Academy near Mebane, N.C., the University of North Carolina at Chapel Hill, and Virginia Military Institute at Lexington. He joined the Confederate Army and served as a courier on the staff of Gen. R. F. Hoke. He later surrendered with Gen. Joseph E. Johnston's army in 1865.

Branch studied law but never practiced. In 1867 he took charge of his landed estate near Washington, Beaufort County, N.C., and engaged in agricultural pursuits. He was elected as a Democrat to the Fifty-second and Fifty-third Congresses (March 4, 1891 – March 3, 1895) and was an unsuccessful candidate for re-election in 1894 to the Fifty-fourth Congress. He again engaged in agricultural pursuits on his estate. In 1896 Branch became a member of the State house of representatives. He died in Washington, N.C., November 18, 1910; interment in Oakdale Cemetery.

U.S. House of Representatives
Preceded by Thomas G. Skinner	Member of the U.S. House of Representatives from North Carolina's 1st congressional district 1891–1895	Succeeded by Harry Skinner
