= William Theophilus Dortch =

American politician

Confederate States Senator from North Carolina
- In office February 18, 1862 – May 10, 1865
- Preceded by: Constituency established
- Succeeded by: Constituency abolished

47th Speaker of the North Carolina House of Commons
- In office 1860–1861
- Preceded by: Thomas Settle Jr.
- Succeeded by: Nathan N. Fleming

Member of the North Carolina House of Commons from Wayne County
- In office 1852–1861
- Preceded by: Curtis H. Brogden
- Succeeded by: B. B. Rives

Personal details
- Born: August 23, 1824 Nash County, North Carolina
- Died: November 21, 1889 (aged 65) Goldsboro, North Carolina
- Party: Democratic

William Theophilus Dortch (August 23, 1824 – November 21, 1889) was an American politician who served as a Confederate States senator from North Carolina from 1862 to 1865. He also served as Speaker of the North Carolina House of Representatives. He served in the North Carolina Senate from 1879 to 1885.

== Early life ==
Dortch was born August 23, 1824 to William Dortch and his wife, Drusilla at his father's plantation, situated in Nash County, North Carolina about 5 miles from the town of Rocky Mount, North Carolina.

== Political career ==
Dortch was a member of the North Carolina General Assembly from 1852 to 1861. In 1860 Dortch served as Speaker of the House of Commons. During the Civil War, Dortch served as a senator from North Carolina in the First Confederate Congress and the Second Confederate Congress (from 1862 to 1865). After the war, he again served in the legislature, first in the North Carolina House of Representatives, and then in the North Carolina Senate from 1879 to 1885. He was President pro tempore of that body from 1881 to 1883.

== Death ==
Dortch died November 21, 1889 in Goldsboro, North Carolina and was buried in Willow Dale Cemetery.

== Personal life ==
Dortch married Elizabeth Pittman of Edgecombe County, North Carolina, they had seven children. Dortch later married Hattie Williams of Berryville, Virginia, they had four children.

Political offices
Preceded by Thomas Settle	Speaker of the North Carolina House of Representatives; 1860–1861	Succeeded by Nathan Fleming
Preceded by William Graham	President pro tempore of the North Carolina Senate; 1881–1883	Succeeded by Edwin Boykin
Confederate States Senate
New constituency	Confederate States Senator (Class 2) from North Carolina; 1862–1865; Served alongside: George Davis, Edwin Reade, William Graham	Constituency abolished
