= Lawing, Missouri =

Extinct hamlet in Missouri, U.S.

Coordinates: 36°55′26″N 93°10′11″W

Lawing is an extinct town in Christian County, in the U.S. state of Missouri. The community was located on Logan Ridge along the south edge of the Springfield Plateau. Missouri Route W passes through the location and Christian Center is about one mile to the north. The city of Ozark is approximately seven miles to the north-northwest.

A post office called Lawing was established in 1898, and remained in operation until 1917. The community was named after Billie Lawing, a pioneer citizen.
