= Nellie Neal Lawing =

Alaskan frontierswoman, roadhouse operator and hunter

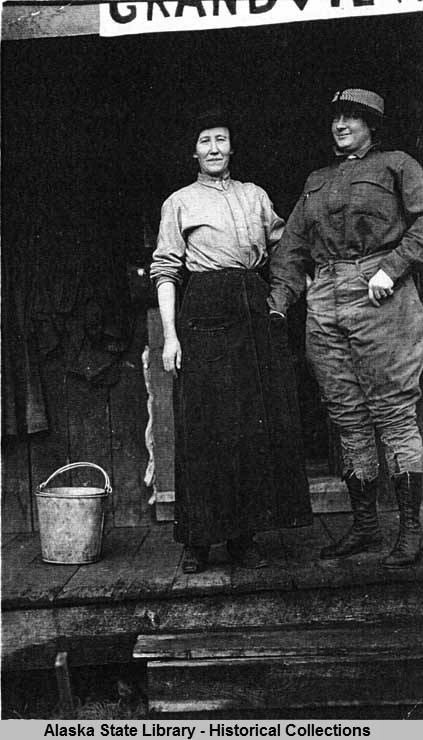
- Nellie Lawing (left), ca. 1915
- Born: 1874; Missouri, United States
- Died: 1956 (aged 81–82); Alaska, United States
- Other name: Alaska Nellie
- Occupations: Frontierswoman; Roadhouse operator Hunter; Postmistress

Nellie Neal Lawing (1874-1956), known as Alaska Nellie, was an Alaskan frontierswoman, roadhouse operator, and hunter. Born in Missouri, Lawing moved to Alaska in 1915 after leaving her first marriage. She worked as a camp cook until the next spring, when she won a government contract to open a roadhouse along the Alaska Railroad. Her first roadhouse was located at Mile 45 of the railroad, an area which she named Grandview; while at the roadhouse, she gained a reputation as a hunter and dog sled musher and became a local hero after saving a mail carrier in a blizzard. She later ran the Kern Creek Roadhouse and a roadhouse in the Hurricane area. While working at the latter roadhouse in 1923, she met then-U.S. President Warren G. Harding, members of his cabinet, and Alaska Governor Scott Bone, who were traveling the railroad to honor its completion.

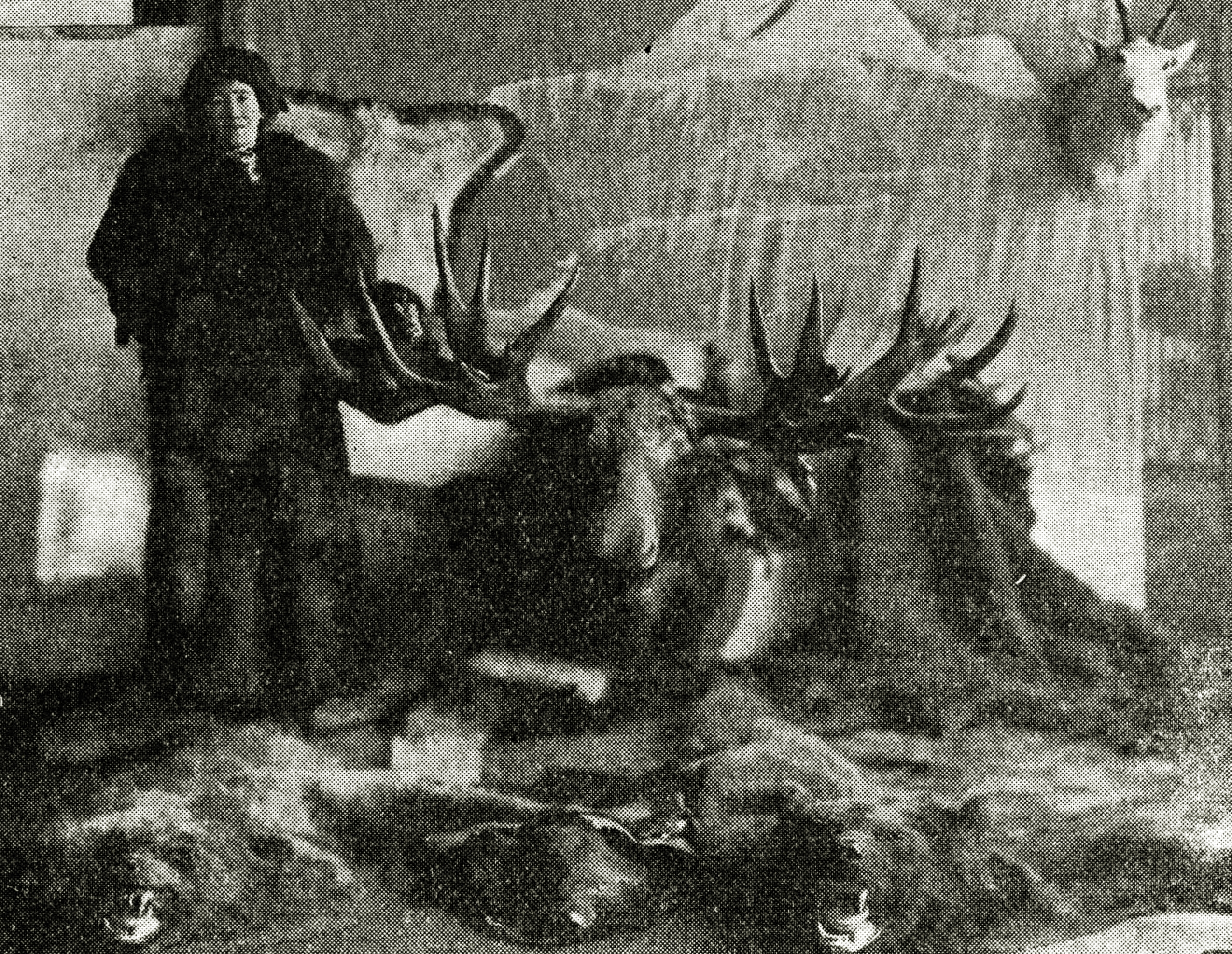
Nellie Neal and Her Trophies

Lawing became engaged to Kenneth Holden in 1923, but he was killed in an industrial accident before the two could marry. Due to her despair and the decreasing need for railroad roadhouse operators, Lawing retired to the Roosevelt roadhouse on Kenai Lake. She soon received a marriage proposal from Holden's cousin Bill Lawing; the two married and converted the Roosevelt roadhouse to a restaurant and museum. When a post office opened at the site in 1924, it was named Lawing in Nellie's honor; she served as the postmistress for its first nine years of operation.

Nellie opened a wildlife museum in her roadhouse, which she filled with her many hunting trophies. Her collection already filled two railcars when she moved to the roadhouse, and it continued to expand while she lived there; among other prizes, it included three stuffed glacier bears. She also was known to keep pet bear cubs in the museum. Her museum became a major tourist attraction, and she gave lectures on Alaska's wildlife to visitors; some of her more prominent visitors included Will Rogers, Alice Calhoun, and Simon Bolivar Buckner, Jr.

Lawing appears in the 1939 documentary short film Land of Alaska Nellie, an entry in James A. FitzPatrick's Traveltalks series.
