= Alaska Nellie's Homestead =

Historic house in Alaska, United States

- U.S. National Register of Historic Places
- Alaska Heritage Resources Survey
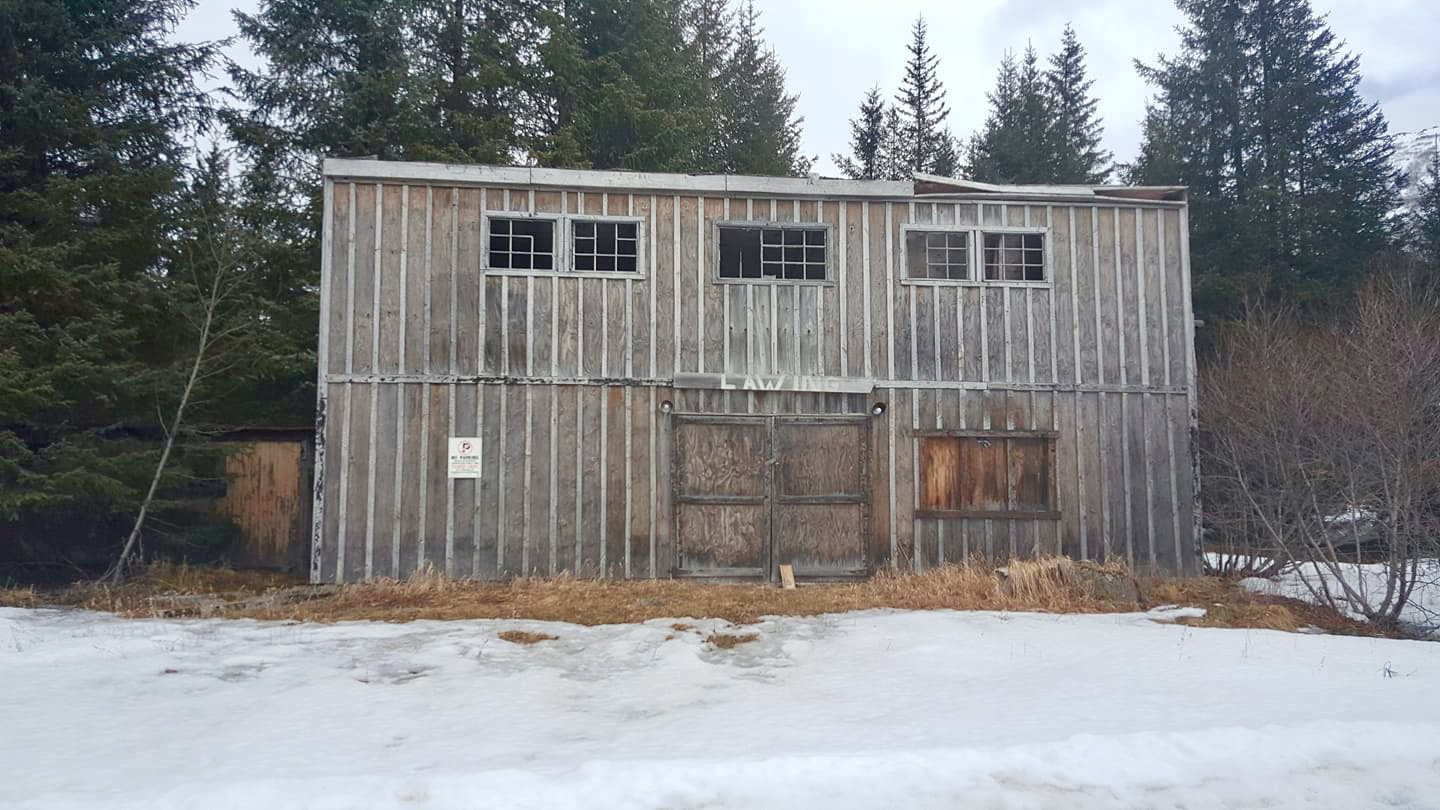

- Location within Alaska
- Nearest city: Lawing, Alaska
- Coordinates: 60°24′4″N 149°21′53″W
- Area: 4.3 acres (1.7 ha)
- Built: 1923
- Built by: Billie Lawing
- NRHP reference No.: 75002159
- AHRS No.: SEW-025
- Added to NRHP: April 3, 1975

Alaska Nellie's Homestead, located at Mile 23 of the Seward Highway in Kenai Peninsula Borough, Alaska, is the former homestead of Nellie Neal Lawing. Neal Lawing had migrated to Alaska in 1915 and ran a number of roadhouses for the Alaska Railroad before settling at the Roosevelt roadhouse on Kenai Lake in 1923, where she built her homestead. She planned to marry Kenneth Holden after settling, but he died in an industrial accident before their marriage; his cousin Billie Lawing then proposed to her, and the two married. A post office opened in the area in 1924; Nellie was the first postmistress, and the post office was named Lawing in her honor.

Nellie was a wildlife expert and trophy hunter, and she kept her hunting trophies, which included three bears, in the roadhouse. She was also known to keep pet bear cubs outside her home. The homestead became a popular lodge due to Nellie's wildlife lectures, and it attracted guests such as Will Rogers, Alice Calhoun, and Simon Bolivar Buckner, Jr. After Billie died in 1936, Nellie continued to operate the lodge and roadhouse until her death in 1956.

The roadhouse was destroyed in the 1960s, likely by the rising waters of Kenai Lake after the 1964 Alaska earthquake. The homestead was added to the National Register of Historic Places in 1975; at the time, only the homestead and a number of outbuildings still stood at the site. The homestead was used as a tourist shop in the 1970s and later became a bed and breakfast; however, it was eventually vacated. In 1998, the Alaska Association for Historic Preservation listed the site as one of the ten most endangered historic properties in the state.

== See also ==
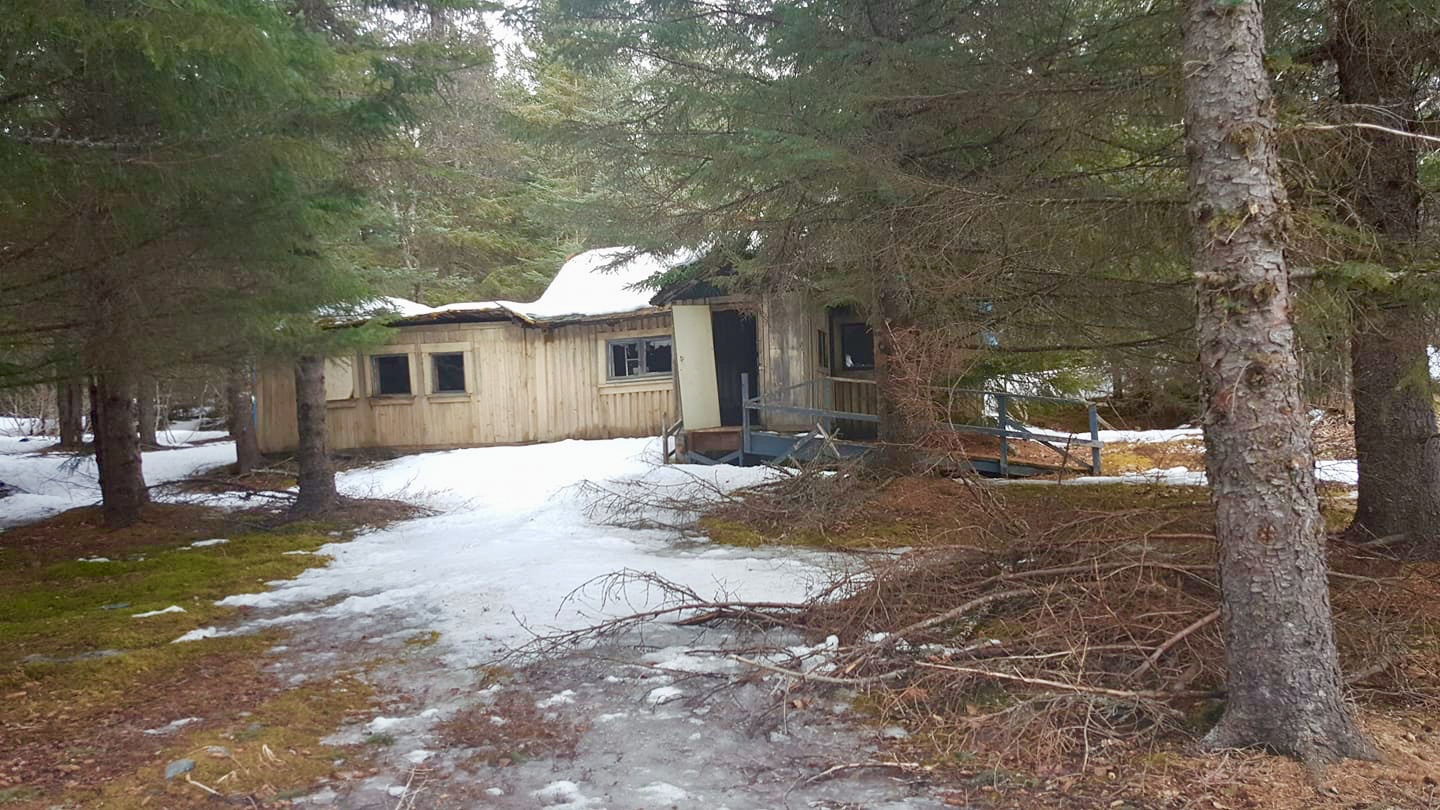
One of the remaining buildings on the homestead

- National Register of Historic Places listings in Kenai Peninsula Borough, Alaska
