= Matthias Evans Manly =

American judge (1801–1881)

Matthias Evans Manly (1801–1881) was an American jurist who served as a justice of the North Carolina Supreme Court from 1860 to 1865. He was the brother of North Carolina Governor Charles Manly and the son-in-law of state Supreme Court Judge William Gaston.

Manly graduated from the University of North Carolina at Chapel Hill (where he would later serve as a Trustee) in 1824. He practiced law in New Bern, North Carolina, was elected to the North Carolina House of Commons for a term, and served as a North Carolina Superior Court judge for approximately twenty years, before being named to the Supreme Court. He filled the seat left vacant by Justice Thomas Ruffin's second retirement.

Shortly after the end of the Civil War, Manly was forced to give up his seat on the Supreme Court but was elected in 1866 to the North Carolina Senate, where he served as Speaker. The state legislature elected Manly to the United States Senate, but he was not allowed to take his seat. He later became mayor of New Bern.
