= Edward Jenner Warren =

North Carolina state legislator (1826-1876)

Edward Jenner Warren (1826 - 1876) was an American lawyer, state legislator, and judge in North Carolina. He served three terms in the North Carolina Senate in the 1862, 1864 and 1870 terms.

He was a native of Vermont. He had a wife Deborah Virginia Bonner Warren (1829-1910), daughter Lucy Wheelock Warren (1850-1937) who attended Saint Mary's School in Raleigh, North Carolina from 1865 to 1867, and a son Charles Frederick Warren (1852-1904), who studied at Washington College (predecessor of Washington and Lee University) in Lexington, Virginia from 1869 to 1873. A collection of his papers and correspondence is extant. He corresponded with Thomas Sparrow.

== See also ==
- President pro tempore of the North Carolina Senate
