= Louis Dicken Wilson =

American politician

Personal details
- Born: May 12, 1789 Tar River, in Edgecombe County, North Carolina
- Died: August 12, 1847 (aged 58)
- Party: Democratic
- Profession: Politician and general, Speaker of the North Carolina Senate

Louis Dicken Wilson (May 12, 1789 - August 12, 1847) was a North Carolinian politician and general in the United States Army. He served in the General Assembly of North Carolina and the North Carolina Senate for in various terms between 1814 and 1846. Wilson County, North Carolina is named in his honor, as well as the city of Wilson, North Carolina.

He was a member of the Democratic Party. His traditional opponents during elections were Whigs.

== Biography ==
Wilson was born on May 12, 1789, to William Wilson and Elizabeth Dicken at their plantation south of Tar River in Edgecombe County, North Carolina. After receiving an education at the local academy, in 1807 he moved to Washington, Connecticut where he worked in a Counting house. Apparently, around this time he also studied law because a few years later, he returned home and practiced as a Notary Public on May 28, 1812. By February 24, 1817, he became a Justice of the Peace.

He represented Edgecombe County, North Carolina in the General Assembly of North Carolina from 1814 to 1819 and in the North Carolina Senate in 1820 then again from 1824 to 1832. In 1835, Wilson served as the Tarboro Tax Collector and he also became a delegate to the North Carolina constitutional convention in the same year. By 1842, Wilson was chosen as the Speaker of the Senate while his name frequently surfaced on the Electoral ticket as Elector of the State, for President and Vice-President.

== Mexican War ==
On December 19, 1827, Wilson was elected Brigadier-General of the 5th North Carolina Brigade, a rank he held as late as 1846. In his desire to fight in the Mexican American War, he requested a leave of absence from the State Senate On December 12, 1846. Wilson returned to Edgecombe and on January 5 of next year, he was made Captain of Company A of the First Edgecombe Volunteer Regiment, which summarily deployed to Mexico. On March 3, 1847, Wilson was offered the post of Colonel of the 12th Regiment of the United States Infantry by President James K. Polk. He returned to Washington to accept the position on April 9.

Six days before commanding 850 troops out of Veracruz, Mexico, Wilson contracted yellow fever and he died on August 7, 1847. He was given a military funeral the day after and his casket was shipped to his hometown where a monument was erected in his honor.

He was never married and had no recorded children. He did, however, state in his will that Edgecombe County would receive a substantial sum of $40,000 for helping the county's poor (of which only $12,000 was properly utilized, $10,000 lost to bad investments and $18,000 skimmed off by certain government officials during Reconstruction).
