= W. Craig Lawing =

American politician

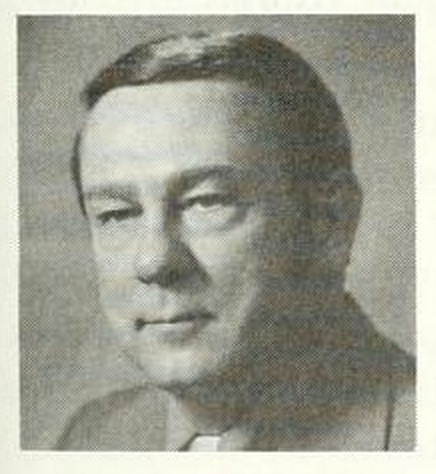

Member of the North Carolina Senate from the 32nd district
- In office 1977–1984

Personal details
- Born: July 6, 1925 Mecklenburg County, North Carolina, US
- Died: June 10, 1999 (aged 73) North Carolina, United States, US
- Party: Democratic
- Education: University of Chattanooga

William Craig Lawing (July 6, 1925 – June 10, 1999) was a member of the North Carolina House of Representatives (1971–1976) and of the North Carolina Senate (1977–1984) representing Mecklenburg County, and served as President Pro Tempore of the North Carolina Senate for three terms (1979–1984). While a senator, Lawing was a sponsor of the Equal Rights Amendment, which the legislature rejected.

Lawing was the longest-serving president pro tem of the state senate until Marc Basnight.

He died in 1999.
