= Kenneth Claiborne Royall Jr. =

American politician

Kenneth C. Royall Jr.

Member of the North Carolina Senate from the 13th district
- In office January 1, 1973 – January 1, 1993
- Preceded by: Claude Currie
- Succeeded by: Wib Gulley

Member of the North Carolina House of Representatives from the 18th district
- In office 1967–1973

Personal details
- Born: Kenneth Claiborne Royall Jr. September 2, 1918 Warsaw, North Carolina, U.S.
- Died: June 5, 1999 (aged 80) Durham, North Carolina, U.S.
- Resting place: Maplewood Cemetery
- Party: Democratic
- Spouse: Julia Zollicoffer (m. 1945; died 1995)
- Parent: Kenneth Claiborne Royall (father)
- Education: University of North Carolina

Kenneth Claiborne Royall Jr. (September 2, 1918 – June 5, 1999) was an American politician and businessman.

== Biography ==
Born in Warsaw, North Carolina, Royall was the son of Margaret Pierce (née Best) and Kenneth C. Royall Sr., the last Secretary of War and first Secretary of the Army. Royall graduated from the University of North Carolina at Chapel Hill. He went to Wake Forest University School of Law and the University of Virginia Law School. He served in the United States Marine Corps during World War II. Royall owned a furniture store in Durham, North Carolina. He served on the Durham County School Board. Royall then served in the North Carolina House of Representatives (1967–1973) and then the North Carolina State Senate (1973–1993) as a Democrat. In the Senate, he was majority leader and chairman of the Appropriations committee, and he advocated for mental health and blindness prevention. The state-supported Kenneth C. Royall Jr. Children's Vision Screening Improvement Program is named in his honor. He was key to the formation of the North Carolina School of Science and Mathematics and to the Royall Center for the Arts, both in Durham.

He died in Durham, North Carolina on June 5, 1999, at the age of 80. Kenneth Royall's wife, Julia, died in Durham, North Carolina on November 30, 1995, at age 71. They were interred in Maplewood Cemetery.
