= North Carolina Law Review =

- Discipline: Law
- Language: English
- Edited by: Mary A. Childs

Publication details
- History: 1922-present
- Publisher: North Carolina Law Review Association (United States)
- Frequency: Bimonthly

Standard abbreviations
- Bluebook: N.C. L. Rev.
- ISO 4: N. C. Law Rev.

Indexing
- ISSN: 0029-2524
- LCCN: 25025666
- OCLC no.: 01760563

Links
- Journal homepage

The North Carolina Law Review is a law journal of the University of North Carolina School of Law. It publishes six issues each year as well as its online supplement, the North Carolina Law Review Forum (Bluebook abbreviation: N.C. L. Rev. F.).

== History ==
Established in 1922, the North Carolina Law Review is the oldest law journal in the state and tied for the seventh oldest in the American South. (Note: The older legal journals in the South are the Kentucky Law Journal (founded in 1881), West Virginia Law Review (1894), Georgetown Law Journal (1912), Virginia Law Review (1913), Tulane Law Review (1916), and Loyola Law Review (1920). The Tennessee Law Review and Texas Law Review were both founded in 1922 too.) In its first volume, the founding editors wrote that the journal would provide "a supplement to the routine daily class work of the School, [and] it will afford to the second and third year students, a means of intensive training in legal writing."

Due to its "local roots" in North Carolina, the Review has historically tailored much of its content to state concerns. Until 1959, the Review regularly published comprehensive surveys of new North Carolina statutes, but space constraints and expanding legislative action made the surveys impracticable for the journal. In Volume 50, it was estimated that 43% of the Review's articles focused on state issues and 57% focused on national and international issues, working toward the "dual objective" of addressing "both provincial and more general topics."

The number of students serving as the journal's editorial board and staff has fluctuated over time. At one point during World War II, only three students were on the Review with four advising faculty members. At the time, the journal listed multiple "Editors in War Service" alongside its standard masthead. By 2023, its membership had grown to 70 students.

== Ranking and impact ==
In 2022, the North Carolina Law Review was ranked #38 among law journals by Washington and Lee University School of Law. This marked a steady climb in the rankings since 2018, when it had placed #47. According to a 2023 meta-ranking conducted by University of Oregon Professor Bryce Clayton Newell, the Review was ranked #30.

Throughout the late twentieth century, the North Carolina Supreme Court cited the Review more than any other law review in the state. (Note: From 1960 to 2000, the North Carolina Law Review was cited by the state's supreme court over 110 times.) The Review has been cited by state courts, United States courts of appeals, and the United States Supreme Court, and its members have gone on to clerk for Supreme Court justices.

== Alumni ==
=== Academia ===
- William Brantley Aycock, chancellor of the University of North Carolina at Chapel Hill
- Martin Brinkley, dean of the University of North Carolina School of Law
- George C. Cochran, civil rights scholar and law professor at the University of Mississippi School of Law
- Jefferson B. Fordham, dean of the University of Pennsylvania Law School
- S. Elizabeth Gibson, law professor at the University of North Carolina School of Law
- Thomas Warren Ross, president of the University of North Carolina system

=== Executive politics and public life ===
- Julius L. Chambers, civil rights leader, chancellor of North Carolina Central University, and first African-American editor-in-chief
- C. Boyden Gray, White House counsel and ambassador to the European Union
- Grier Martin, assistant secretary of defense for manpower and reserve affairs at the U.S. Department of Defense
- Matthew G.T. Martin, United States attorney for the Middle District of North Carolina
- Dan K. Moore, governor of North Carolina
- Ripley Rand, United States attorney for the Middle District of North Carolina
- Teresa Wynn Roseborough, deputy assistant attorney general at the U.S. Department of Justice and general counsel at The Home Depot

=== Judiciary ===
- Tamara P. Barringer, justice of the North Carolina Supreme Court
- Algernon Lee Butler, district judge of the United States District Court for the Eastern District of North Carolina
- Mark A. Davis, justice of the North Carolina Supreme Court
- Franklin Taylor Dupree Jr., district judge of the United States District Court for the Eastern District of North Carolina
- James Carroll Fox, district judge of the United States District Court for the Eastern District of North Carolina

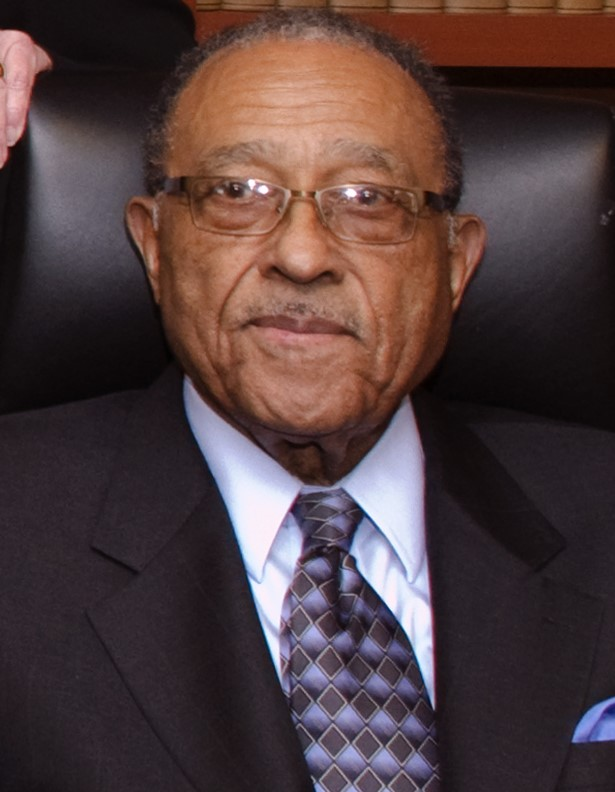
Henry Frye

- Henry Frye, first African-American chief justice of the North Carolina Supreme Court
- Martha A. Geer, judge of the North Carolina Court of Appeals
- Lucy Inman, judge of the North Carolina Court of Appeals
- Barbara Jackson, justice of the North Carolina Supreme Court
- Richard E. Myers II, chief district judge of the United States District Court for the Eastern District of North Carolina
- Sarah Parker, chief justice of the North Carolina Supreme Court
- James Dickson Phillips Jr., circuit judge of the United States Court of Appeals for the Fourth Circuit
- Martin Karl Reidinger, chief district judge of the United States District Court for the Western District of North Carolina
- David B. Sentelle, senior circuit judge of the United States Court of Appeals for the District of Columbia Circuit
- Susie Sharp, first female chief justice of the North Carolina Supreme Court
- Emin Toro, judge of the U.S. Tax Court
- Lacy Thornburg, district judge of the United States District Court for the Western District of North Carolina and attorney general of North Carolina
- Willis Whichard, justice of the North Carolina Supreme Court

=== Legislature ===
- Dan Bishop, U.S. representative from North Carolina

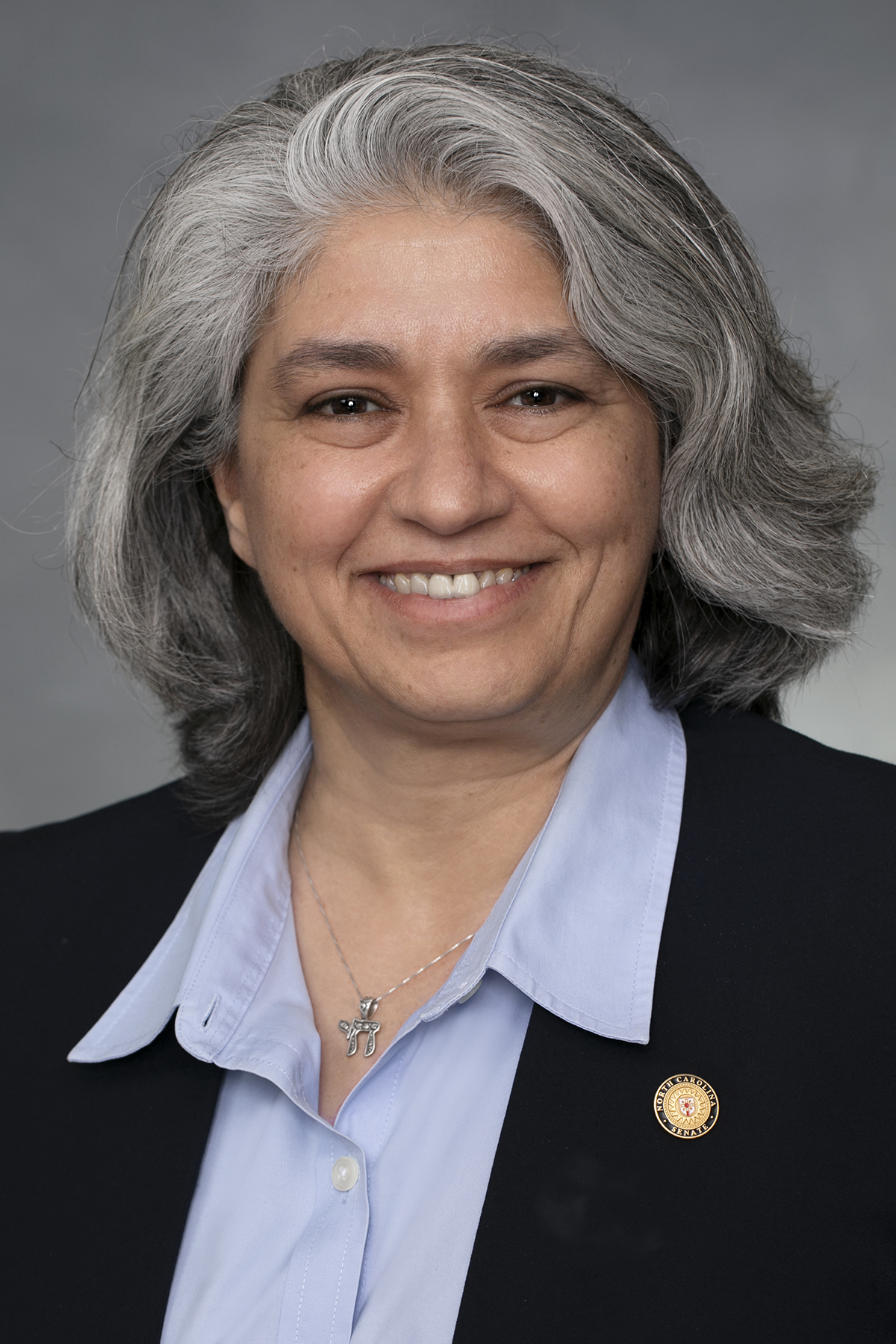
Lisa Grafstein

- Lisa Grafstein, North Carolina state senator
- Charles R. Jonas, U.S. representative from North Carolina
- Tim Longest, North Carolina state representative

=== Other ===
- William Johnson, president and CEO of the Pacific Gas and Electric Company
