= 2028 North Carolina judicial elections =

At least three justices of the seven-member North Carolina Supreme Court and five judges of the fifteen-member North Carolina Court of Appeals are scheduled to be elected by North Carolina voters on November 7, 2028, concurrently with other state elections. Terms for seats on each court are eight years. These elections are conducted on a partisan basis.

Primary elections (for seats with more than one candidate from a political party) are scheduled to be held on March 7, 2028.

== Supreme Court Chief Justice seat ==
Chief Justice Paul Martin Newby is the incumbent. Due to the state's mandatory retirement age of 76 for Supreme Court justices, Newby would be eligible to run in 2028 but would not be able to complete another full term.

=== Republican primary ===
==== Candidates ====
===== Potential =====
- Phil Berger Jr., Supreme Court Associate Justice

== Supreme Court Seat 2 ==
Associate Justice Phil Berger Jr. is the incumbent. He announced in 2026 that he would not run for reelection but did not rule out running for Chief Justice. He later filed campaign finance paperwork laying the groundwork to potentially run for Chief Justice.

=== Democratic primary ===
==== Candidates ====
- Bryan Collins, North Carolina Superior Court Judge

== Supreme Court Seat 4 ==
Associate Justice Tamara P. Barringer is the incumbent.

== Court of Appeals Seat 4 ==
Judge April Wood is the incumbent.

== Court of Appeals Seat 5 ==
Judge Fred Gore is the incumbent.

== Court of Appeals Seat 6 ==
Judge Chris Dillon is the incumbent.

== Court of Appeals Seat 7 ==
Judge Jeff Carpenter is the incumbent.

== Court of Appeals Seat 13 ==
Judge Jefferson Griffin is the incumbent.

== See also ==
- 2028 North Carolina elections
