= Ken Lee =

Kenneth or Ken Lee may refer to:

- Ken Lee (businessman) (1932–2007), Chinese Australian businessman, co-founder of Bing Lee stores in Australia
- Ken Lee (linebacker) (born 1948), American football linebacker
- Kenneth B. Lee (1922–2010), American politician, Speaker of the Pennsylvania House of Representatives
- Kenneth E. Lee (born 1961), American politician in Pennsylvania
- Ken Lee (RAF officer) (1915–2008), British Second World War flying ace
- Kenneth K. Lee (born 1975), United States Circuit Judge of the United States Court of Appeals for the Ninth Circuit
- J. Kenneth Lee (1923–2018), American civil rights attorney
- Ken Lee (meme), Bulgarian Internet meme
- Killing of Ken Lee, 2022 knife attack
