= Music Idol =

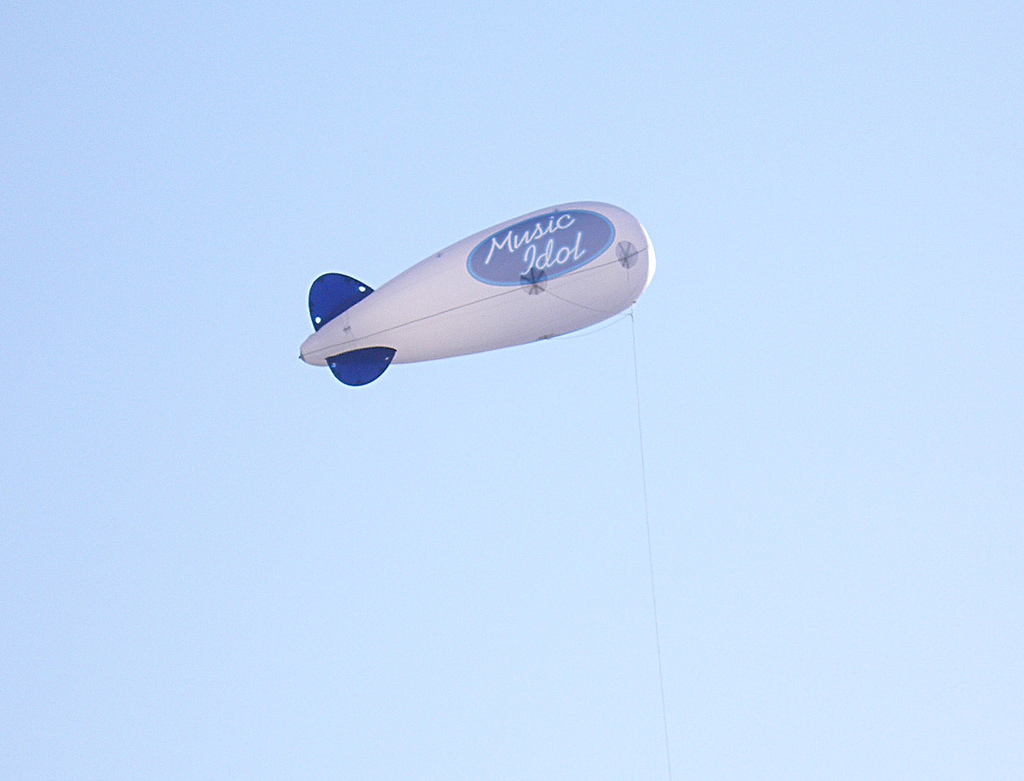
- Music Idol (Bulgarian Pop Idol) balloon over Rousse, Bulgaria
- Created by: Simon Fuller
- Presented by: Ivan Hristov; Andrey Arnaudov; Sanja Nikolic
- Judges: Yordanka Hristova; Slavi Trifonov; Gloria; Doni; Vili Kazasyan; Dimitar Kovachev - Funky; Esil Duran; Lucy Diakovska; Maria
- Country of origin: Bulgaria
- Original language: Bulgarian

Original release
- Network: bTV
- Release: February 26, 2007 – June 8, 2009

Music Idol (Мюзик айдъл) is the Bulgarian version of the British television hit show Pop Idol. It was a talent contest to determine the superior pop performer. Its first season was aired on bTV from February 26 until June 7, 2007. During its third season, the show went international and auditions took place in neighboring Macedonia. Other major changes in the third season: minimum age for participants 13 (not 16), more talk show than music, great accent on the hosts, hidden vote results, which makes it impossible to validate the result of each elimination.

== Hosts and judges ==
Сезон	Hosts			Judges			
1	Ivan Hristov	Andrey Arnaudov		Doni	Yordanka Hristova	Gloria	Slavi Trifonov
2	Ivan Hristov	Andrey Arnaudov		Lucy Diakovska	Vili Kazasyan	Esil Duran	Dimitar Kovachev — Funky
3	Ivan Hristov	Andrey Arnaudov	Sanja Nikolic (Live Shows)	Doni	Maria	Dimitar Kovachev — Funky	

== Rules ==
=== Season 1 ===
==== Qualifications ====
Auditioners must be between the ages of 13 and 28. They must be Bulgarian citizens.

==== Auditions ====
Castings are held in the five biggest cities in Bulgaria - Rousse, Varna, Bourgas, Plovdiv and Sofia. After a pre-selection the contenders audition in front of the panel of judges seen on TV who will decide if they are going to make it to the next round.

==== Theatre Round ====
In three days the judges chose among the top 100, from all cities, the semifinalists who would perform live during the show and face the public's vote.

==== Semifinals ====
From now on it is up to the Bulgarian public to vote their favorite contestants into the final 12.

==== Finals ====
Each week the final 12 contestants perform, in front of a live audience, songs from a given theme. Once again the public votes for its favorite with the fewest votes getter being eliminated after one show until only one contestant remains: The winner of Music Idol.

=== Season 2 ===
==== Qualifications ====
There is no age limit for the auditioners. They must be Bulgarian citizens.

==== Auditions ====
Castings are held in the five biggest cities in Bulgaria - Rousse, Varna, Bourgas, Plovdiv and Sofia. Philipp Kirkorov joined auditions and the show only once as a judge - only in Varna. He temporarily replaced Lucy Diakovska at that stage. After a pre-selection the contenders audition in front of the panel of judges, seen on TV, who will decide if they are going to make it to the next round.

==== Theatre Round ====
The competitors are split in groups and they sing solo (like in the previous round). After that the jury decides who will continue. After that the remaining contestants sing in quartets and the jury picks the best of them. Then they sing solo and the jury picks 18 people for the semi-finals.

==== Semifinals ====
The competitors are split in two groups − male and female. After their first concert the public votes for them and two boys and two girls are eliminated. After that they have another concert and two boys and two girls are again eliminated. After that the eliminated eight contestants sing again and three of them are let back in the show.

==== Finals ====
Each week the final 13 contestants perform in front of a live audience songs from a given theme. Once again the public votes for its favorite, the two people with the fewest votes sing and the public votes again. The contestant with the fewest votes is eliminated. This goes on until only one contestant remains: The winner of Music Idol.

== Season 1 ==
=== Judges ===
- Doni − pop singer and composer
- Yordanka Hristova (chairman) − estrade singer
- Gloria − pop-folk singer
- Slavi Trifonov − pop-folk singer, host and producer

=== Auditions ===
- Rousse (January 18)
- Varna (January 25)
- Burgas (February 1)
- Plovdiv (February 8)
- Sofia (February 15)

There was one exception to the age-rule − Kremena from Dobrich was allowed to participate, despite her age of 15. She eventually became a finalist later on.

=== Semifinals ===
For one week (March 12 to March 19) the top 40 performed each night in five groups including eight singers with the two top vote getters advancing to the finals. On Friday night the judges announced eight singers who received another chance to perform with the top vote getter and the final pick of the judges joining the other finalists to the top 12.

==== Group 1 − March 12, 2007 ====
- Tihomir Dimitrov - "Ne Taka" (17.9%)
- Preslava Peycheva - "(Everything I Do) I Do It for You" (9.3%)
- Emiliya Dutsolova - "Povey Vetre" (11.0%)
- Syuleyman Evadpal - "This Love"
- Nikolay Manolov - "Iskam te" (17.4%)
- Krasimira Ivanova - "One Moment in Time" (26.3%)
- Preslava Mravkova - "I Believe I Can Fly"
- Ina Petrova - "Hero"

==== Group 2 − March 13, 2007 ====
- Daniela Nikolova (6.4%)
- Vasil Modev (11.8%)
- Ivaylo Donkov (7.4%)
- Stefan Lalchev (30.0%)
- Maya Georgieva
- Mariya Dimitrova
- Valentina Dimitrova (26.5%)
- Rosen Kukosharov

==== Group 3 − March 14, 2007 ====
- Gita Petkova (8.4%)
- Yanitsa Dafinova
- Iskren Ribchev (15.6%)
- Plamen Patov (31.3%)
- Veselina Nikolova
- Gergana Koyeva (10.6%)
- Rumen Nehrizov (18.0%)
- Aneliya Bakalova

==== Group 4 − March 15, 2007 ====
- Lazar Valchev (8.9%)
- Silvia Moneva (12.1%)
- Vasil Chergov
- Plamena Petrova
- Georgi Georgiev
- Denislav Novev (9.6%)
- Iliana Kovacheva (15.6%)
- Nevena Tsoneva (35.5%)

==== Group 5 − March 16, 2007 ====
- Dimitar Atanasov
- Teodor Koychinov (7.8%)
- Maria Bachvarova (8.0%)
- Vasko Ivanov (9.7%)
- Kremena Dimitrova (30.8%)
- Vasil Stoyanov
- Denitsa Hadzhiivanova (24.4%)
- Kristina Kokorska

==== Wildcards − March 19, 2007 ====
- Vasko Ivanov
- Kristina Kokorska
- Lazar Valchev
- Teodor Koichinov (Judges' Choice)
- Dimitar Atanasov
- Nikolay Manolov
- Preslava Peycheva (Viewers' Choice)
- Silvia Moneva

=== Finals elimination chart ===
Stage:		Semi-Finals						Finals										
Week:		3/12	3/13	3/14	3/15	3/16	3/19	3/26	4/2	4/9	4/16	4/23	4/30	5/7	5/14	5/21	5/28	6/4
Place	Contestant	Result																
1	Nevena Tsoneva				1st										Btm3			Winner
2	Teodor Koychinov					Elim	WC					Btm3			Btm2	Btm2	Btm2	Runner-Up
3	Preslava Peycheva	Elim					WC				Btm2			Btm3			Elim	
4	Stefan Lalchev		1st										Btm2			Elim		
5	Kremena Dimitrova					1st				Btm2		Btm2	Btm3	Btm2	Elim			
6	Plamen Patov			1st							Btm3			Elim				
7	Iliyana Kovacheva				2nd			Btm2					Elim					
8	Krasimira Ivanova	1st							Btm3			Elim						
9	Rumen Nehrizov			2nd					Btm2	Btm3	Elim							
10	Valentina Dimitrova		2nd							Elim								
11	Tihomir Dimitrov	2nd						Btm3	Elim									
12	Denitsa Hadzhiivanova					2nd		Elim										

== Season 2 ==
=== Judges ===
- Lucy Diakovska - No Angels member
- Vili Kazasyan (chairman) - Bulgarian conductor
- Esil Duran - pop-folk and jazzsinger
- Dimitar Kovachev - "Funky" - Bulgarian rocker and producer, owner of Sofia Music Enterprises

=== Auditions ===
- Rousse (January 17)
- Varna (January 24)
- Burgas (January 31)
- Plovdiv (February 7)
- Sofia (February 14)

=== Semifinals ===
This year saw a change in the semifinal format: After the judges picked their top 18 contestants (9 males, 9 females) the contestants were split in one girls/guys group and had to perform in the week of March 10 − March 15 with constant reduction of the number of singers in both groups to six: after the first performance show the two fewest votes getters got eliminated, leaving the top 7 of girls/guys perform again of which the top 5 vote-getters from each group will advance to the finals. Later on the judges eventually decided to make a top 13 out of the supposed 12, giving three contestants a wildcard for the finals.
Two out of the top 18, Denislav Novev and Plamena Petrova, had already competed in a former year's top 50 but failed to qualify for the finals.

==== Girls Top 9 − March 10, 2008 ====
- Plamena Petrova - "Think Twice"
- Gergana Dimova - "Black Velvet" (eliminated)
- Maria Ilieva - "(You make me feel like) A Natural Woman"
- Chanel Erkin - "Je T'aime"
- Elena Ivanova - "Man! I Feel Like A Woman" (eliminated)
- Ana Topalova - "Visoko" (bottom three)
- Sonia Membrenho - "Iskam te"
- Nora Karaivanova - "The Voice Within"
- Denitsa Georgieva - "Respect"

==== Guys Top 9 − March 11, 2008 ====
- Ivan Angelov - "Change The World"
- Ivaylo Donev - "Georgia On My Mind"
- Yasen Zerdev - "New Flame" (eliminated)
- Denislav Novev - "You Rise Me Up"
- Toma Zdravkov - "Summer In The City"
- Damyan Popov - "Pochti zabravena ljubov"
- Viktor Georgiev - "Stars" (eliminated)
- Lazar Kisyov - "Sbogom, moya ljubov" (bottom three)
- Stoyan Tsonev - "Incomplete"

==== Girls Top 7 − March 13, 2008 ====
- Maria Ilieva - "Adagio" (eliminated)
- Denitsa Georgieva - "Proud Mary"
- Chanel Erkin - "Bleeding Love" (bottom three)
- Sonia Membrenho - "Listen" (eliminated)
- Ana Topalova - "Every Breath you take"
- Plamena Petrova - "Ustrem"
- Nora Karaivanova - "Ain't no Sunshine"

==== Guys Top 7 − March 15, 2008 ====
- Toma Zdravkov - "Walking By Myself"
- Damyan Popov - "Svetat e za dvama" (eliminated)
- Denislav Novev - "Let Me Entertain You"
- Stoyan Tsonev - "Sineva"
- Lazar Kisyov - "I Surrender" (eliminated)
- Ivaylo Donev - "Great Balls Of Fire"
- Ivan Angelov - "Se bastasse una canzone"

==== Wildcards − March 18, 2008 ====
Chosen by the judges to advance to the finals:

- Yasen Zerdev
- Maria Ilieva
- Elena Ivanova

NOTE: The bottom group contestants face off in a sudden death elimination round where the voting lines are re-opened and the public have one more chance to save their favorite from elimination. Stoyan Tsonev, Ana Topalova and Chanel Erkin fell victim to this unique rule despite not receiving the fewest votes on the performance night.

=== Finals elimination chart ===
Stage:		Semi-Finals	Finals										
Week:		3/10-15	3/26	4/2	4/9	4/16	4/23	4/30	5/7	5/14	5/21	5/28	6/2
Place	Contestant	Result											
1	Toma Zdravkov	Finalist											Winner
2	Nora Karaivanova	Finalist		Btm 2							Btm 2	Btm 3	Runner-Up
3	Yasen Zerdev	Wildcard						Btm 2		Btm 3		Btm 2	Elim
4	Denitsa Georgieva	Finalist						Btm 3		Btm 2	Btm 3		Elim
5	Plamena Petrova	Finalist		Elim						WC		Elim	
6	Chanel Erkin	Finalist							Btm 3		Elim		
7	Ana Topalova	Finalist							Btm 2	Elim			
8	Denislav Novev	Finalist			Btm 2				Elim				
9	Ivaylo Donev	Finalist					Btm 2	Elim					
10	Maria Ilieva	Wildcard				Btm 2	Elim						
11	Stoyan Tsonev	Finalist	Btm 2		Btm 2	Elim							
12	Ivan Angelov	Finalist			Elim								
13	Elena Ivanova	Wildcard	Elim										

== Season 3 ==
=== Judges ===
- Doni − Bulgarian pop singer
- Maria − pop-folk singer
- Dimitar Kovachev − "Funky" − Bulgarian rocker and producer

Unlike the previous seasons, there is no chairman of the jury in honor to the late chairman Vili Kazasyan, who died shortly after the 2008 season. Nevertheless, there is a guest star in the jury in every city, where auditions take place. He/She does not have a right to vote, but can advise jury members in reaching the right decision. The guest stars for the 2009 season are:

- Sonia Vassi − Bulgarian singer and model (Varna)
- Toni Dimitrova − Bulgarian pop singer (Burgas)
- Blagovest Argirov - Bulgarian pop singer (Plovdiv)
- Grigor Koprov − famous Macedonian songwriter (Skopje)
- Katya − Bulgarian pop singer, part of the famous duo "Riton" (Sofia)

=== Auditions ===
- Varna (January 24)
- Burgas
- Plovdiv
- Skopje, Macedonia
- Sofia

=== Finalists ===
- Rusina Katardzieva - Eliminated
- Sonia Membreno - Eliminated
- Preslava Mravkova - Eliminated
- Aleksandar Tarabunov - Eliminated
- Boyan Stoykov - Runner-Up
- Eli Radanova - Eliminated
- Simona Stateva - Eliminated
- Viktoria Dimitrova - Withdrew
- Darko Ilievski - Eliminated
- Dimitar Atanasov - Eliminated
- Aleksandra Zhekova - Eliminated
- Magdalena Janavarova - Winner
- Plamen Petkov - Eliminated

=== Finals elimination chart ===
Stage:		Semi-Finals	Finals									
Week:		3/22-27	4/1	4/8	4/15	4/22	4/29	5/6	5/13	5/20	5/27	6/8
Place	Contestant	Result										
1	Magdalena Janavarova	WILDCARD			Btm 5	Btm 3				Btm 4	Btm 5	Winner
2	Boyan Stoykov	PUBLIC					Btm 5				Btm 2	Runner-Up
3	Preslava Mravkova	PUBLIC	Btm 2	Btm 2			Btm 2	Btm 2	Btm 3	Btm 3	Btm 4	Elim
4	Rusina Katardzieva	PUBLIC	Btm 4	Btm 3		Btm 2		Btm 4	Btm 2	Btm 2	Btm 3	Elim
5	Aleksandar Tarabunov	PUBLIC						Btm 5	Btm 5	Btm 5	Elim	
6	Dimitar Atanasov	PUBLIC	Btm 5				Btm 3		Btm 4	Elim		
7	Aleksandra Zhekova	WILDCARD			Btm 3			Btm 3	Elim			
8	Simona Stateva	PUBLIC				Btm 4	Btm 2	Elim				
9	Viktoria Dimitrova	PUBLIC		Btm 4	Btm 2	Btm 5	Withdrew					
10	Eli Radanova	PUBLIC		Btm 5	Btm 4	Elim						
11	Sonia Membrenho	PUBLIC	Btm 4		Elim							
12	Darko Ilievski	PUBLIC		Elim								
13	Plamen Petkov	WILDCARD	Elim									

Legend
Female	Male	Safe	Safe first	Safe second	Contestant in Btm 3	Contestant in Btm 2	Eliminated	Withdrew	Winner

- Viktoria Dimitrova withdrew from the show on the rock concert, thus saving Simona Stateva and Preslava Mravkova from elimination.

== See also ==
- "Ken Lee"
