= Journal of Law & Technology =

Journal of Law & Technology may refer to:

- Harvard Journal of Law & Technology
- George Washington Journal of Law & Technology, a publication of George Washington University Law School
- North Carolina Journal of Law & Technology
