= 2020 North Carolina judicial elections =

2020 North Carolina Supreme Court elections
- November 3, 2020

3 seats of the Supreme Court of North Carolina
	Majority party	Minority party
Party	Democratic	Republican
Last election	5	2
Seats before	6	1
Seats won	0	3
Seats after	4	3
Seat change	▼2	▲2

Three justices of the seven-member North Carolina Supreme Court and five judges of the 15-member North Carolina Court of Appeals were elected by North Carolina voters on November 3, 2020, concurrently with other state elections. Terms for seats on each court are eight years. These elections were conducted on a partisan basis.

Incumbent Court of Appeals Judges Linda McGee and Wanda Bryant (both Democrats) did not reopen their campaign accounts with the State Board of Elections, indicating they would not run for re-election, and they did not file for re-election by the time filing closed on Dec. 20, 2019.

Only one candidate from each party filed for each seat, meaning that no party primary elections would be necessary.

In the general election, Republican candidates won all of the races. The results of the Chief Justice race were only confirmed after a lengthy recount process, because of the narrow margin.

== Supreme Court ==
=== Chief Justice ===
2020 North Carolina Supreme Court Chief Justice election
- November 3, 2020

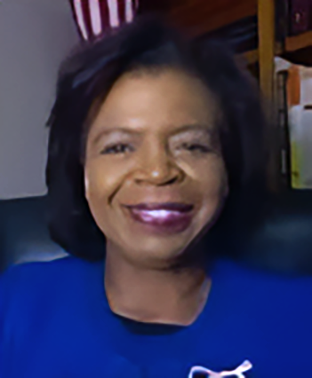
Candidate	Paul Newby	Cheri Beasley
Party	Republican	Democratic
Popular vote	2,695,951	2,695,550
Percentage	50.004%	49.996%
- County results Newby: 50–60% 60–70% 70–80% Beasley: 50–60% 60–70% 70–80% 80–90%
Chief Justice before election
Cheri Beasley
Democratic
Elected Chief Justice
Paul Newby
Republican

Chief Justice Mark Martin, a Republican, announced his resignation in 2019, triggering an election for his seat in 2020. Governor Roy Cooper appointed Associate Justice Cheri Beasley, a Democrat, to become Chief Justice through 2020.

Beasley requested a recount on Nov. 17, 2020. After the recount found the margin between the candidates to be 401 votes, Beasley called for a second recount in a sampling of precincts statewide, as allowed by law. Beasley then conceded the election to Newby on Dec. 12.

==== Candidates ====
- Cheri Beasley (Democratic), incumbent Chief Justice
- Paul Martin Newby (Republican), incumbent Associate Justice

==== Polling ====
Poll source	Date(s) administered	Sample size (Note: Key: A – all adults RV – registered voters LV – likely voters V – unclear)	Margin of error	Cheri Beasley (D)	Paul Newby (R)	Undecided
Cardinal Point Analytics (R)	October 27–28, 2020	750 (LV)	± 3.6%	45%	44%	11%
Meeting Street Insights (R)	October 24–27, 2020	600 (LV)	± 4%	49%	44%	4%
Harper Polling/Civitas (R)	October 22–25, 2020	504 (LV)	± 4.4%	49%	40%	11%
Harper Polling/Civitas (R)	September 17–20, 2020	612 (LV)	± 3.96%	44%	38%	18%

Hypothetical polling

with Generic Democrat and Generic Republican

Poll source	Date(s) administered	Sample size	Margin of error	Generic Democrat	Generic Republican	Other/Undecided
Harper Polling/Civitas (R)	September 17–20, 2020	612 (LV)	± 3.96%	43%	43%	14% (Note: "Neither" with 1%; "Other" with 0%; Undecided with 13%)
Harper Polling/Civitas (R)	August 6–10, 2020	600 (LV)	± 4%	38%	40%	≈22%-23% (Note: Undecided with 21%; "Neither" with 1%; "Other Party" with <1%)
Harper Polling/Civitas (R)	April 5–7, 2020	500 (LV)	± 4.4%	39%	36%	25% (Note: Undecided with 20%; "Neither/other/independent" with 5%)
Harper Polling/Civitas (R)	Released March 17, 2019	– (Note: Not yet released)	–	36%	34%	30% (Note: Undecided with 20%; "Neither/other/independent" with 10%)

==== Results ====
2020 North Carolina Supreme Court Chief Justice election
Party	Candidate	Votes	%
Republican	Paul Martin Newby	2,695,951	50.004%
Democratic	Cheri Beasley (incumbent)	2,695,550	49.996%
Total votes		5,391,501	100.0%
Republican gain from Democratic			

=== Seat 2 ===
2020 North Carolina Supreme Court Associate Justice Seat 2 election
- November 3, 2020

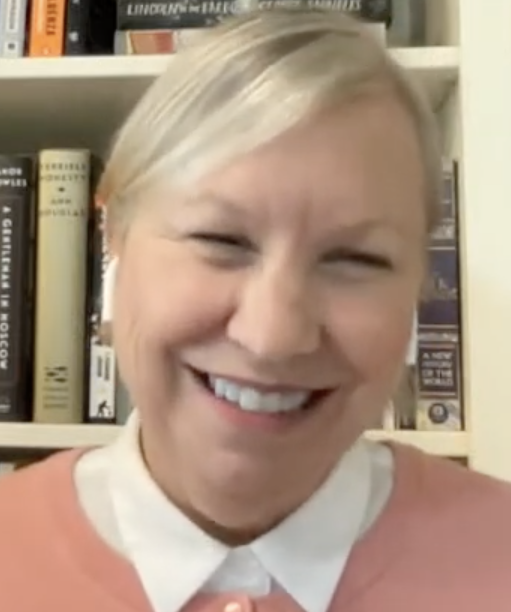
Candidate	Phil Berger Jr.	Lucy Inman
Party	Republican	Democratic
Popular vote	2,723,704	2,652,187
Percentage	50.67%	49.33%
- County results Berger: 50–60% 60–70% 70–80% Inman: 50–60% 60–70% 70–80% 80–90%
Associate Justice before election
Paul Newby
Republican
Elected Associate Justice
Phil Berger Jr.
Republican

The seat held by Associate Justice Paul Martin Newby was up for election in 2020. Newby announced that he would run for Chief Justice instead, leaving his Associate Justice seat open.

==== Candidates ====
- Phil Berger Jr. (Republican), incumbent judge of the North Carolina Court of Appeals
- Lucy Inman (Democratic), incumbent judge of the North Carolina Court of Appeals

==== Polling ====
Poll source	Date(s) administered	Sample size	Margin of error	Phil Berger Jr. (R)	Lucy Inman (D)	Undecided
Meeting Street Insights (R)	October 24–27, 2020	600 (LV)	± 4%	43%	47%	7%

==== Results ====
2020 North Carolina Supreme Court Associate Justice Seat 2 election
Party	Candidate	Votes	%
Republican	Phil Berger Jr.	2,723,704	50.67%
Democratic	Lucy Inman	2,652,187	49.33%
Total votes		5,375,891	100.00%
Republican hold			

=== Seat 4 ===
2020 North Carolina Supreme Court Associate Justice Seat 4 election
- November 3, 2020
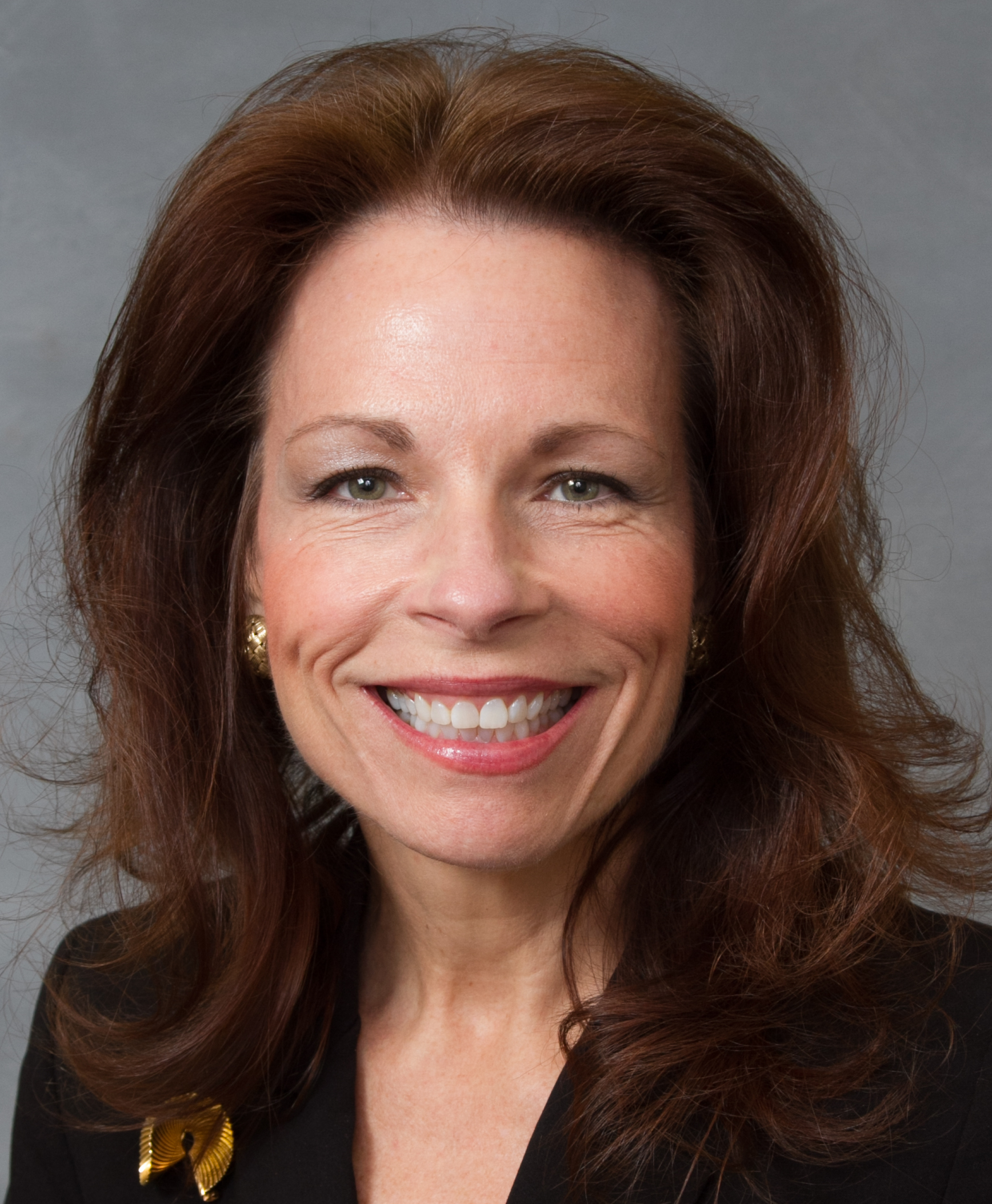

Candidate	Tamara Barringer	Mark A. Davis
Party	Republican	Democratic
Popular vote	2,746,362	2,616,265
Percentage	51.21%	48.79%
- County results Barringer: 50–60% 60–70% 70–80% Davis: 50–60% 60–70% 70–80%
Associate Justice before election
Mark A. Davis
Democratic
Elected Associate Justice
Tamara Barringer
Republican

Beasley's elevation to the position of Chief Justice made her Associate Justice seat vacant, which also triggered a 2020 election. Governor Cooper appointed Court of Appeals Judge Mark A. Davis to fill the vacancy as an associate justice.

==== Candidates ====
- Tamara P. Barringer (Republican), former state senator (2012–2019)
- Mark A. Davis (Democratic), incumbent Associate Justice

==== Polling ====
Poll source	Date(s) administered	Sample size	Margin of error	Mark A. Davis (D)	Tamara P. Barringer (R)	Undecided
Meeting Street Insights (R)	October 24–27, 2020	600 (LV)	± 4%	50%	42%	6%

==== Results ====
2020 North Carolina Supreme Court Associate Justice Seat 4 election
Party	Candidate	Votes	%
Republican	Tamara P. Barringer	2,746,362	51.21%
Democratic	Mark A. Davis (incumbent)	2,616,265	48.79%
Total votes		5,362,627	100.0%
Republican gain from Democratic			

== Court of Appeals ==
=== Seat 4 ===
==== Candidates ====
Declared

- Tricia Shields (Democrat), attorney and Campbell University Law School instructor
- April C. Wood (Republican), North Carolina District Court Judge

==== Results ====
Results by county Wood: 50–60%; 60–70%; 70–80%; 80–90%; Shields: 50–60%; 60–70%; 70–80%

North Carolina Court of Appeals Seat 4 election, 2020
Party	Candidate	Votes	%
Republican	April C. Wood	2,767,469	51.78%
Democratic	Tricia Shields	2,577,013	48.22%
Total votes		5,344,482	100.00%

=== Seat 5 ===
==== Candidates ====
Declared

- Lora Christine Cubbage (Democrat), North Carolina Superior Court Judge
- Fred Gore (Republican), North Carolina District Court Judge

==== Results ====
Results by county Gore: 50–60%; 60–70%; 70–80%; 80–90%; Cubbage: 50–60%; 60–70%; 70–80%

North Carolina Court of Appeals Seat 5 election, 2020
Party	Candidate	Votes	%
Republican	Fred Gore	2,735,952	51.27%
Democratic	Lora Christine Cubbage	2,600,632	48.73%
Total votes		5,336,584	100.00%

=== Seat 6 ===
==== Candidates ====
Declared

- Chris Dillon (Republican), incumbent Court of Appeals Judge
- Gray Styers (Democrat), attorney

==== Results ====
Results by county Dillon: 50–60%; 60–70%; 70–80%; 80–90%; Styers: 50–60%; 60–70%; 70–80%

North Carolina Court of Appeals Seat 6 election, 2020
Party	Candidate	Votes	%
Republican	Chris Dillon (incumbent)	2,769,020	51.95%
Democratic	Gray Styers	2,561,090	48.05%
Total votes		5,330,110	100.00%

=== Seat 7 ===
Judge Reuben Young, a Democrat, was appointed by Gov. Roy Cooper to fill a vacancy, through the end of 2020, and was eligible to run for a full term.

==== Candidates ====
Declared

- Jeff Carpenter (Republican), North Carolina Superior Court Judge
- Reuben Young (Democrat), incumbent Court of Appeals Judge

==== Results ====
Results by county Carpenter: 50–60%; 60–70%; 70–80%; 80–90%; Young: 50–60%; 60–70%; 70–80%

North Carolina Court of Appeals Seat 7 election, 2020
Party	Candidate	Votes	%
Republican	Jeff Carpenter	2,747,109	51.59%
Democratic	Reuben Young (incumbent)	2,578,035	48.41%
Total votes		5,325,144	100.00%

=== Seat 13 ===
Judge Christopher Brook, a Democrat, was appointed by Gov. Roy Cooper to fill a vacancy, through the end of 2020, and was eligible to run for a full term.

==== Candidates ====
Declared

- Christopher Brook (Democrat), incumbent Court of Appeals Judge.
- Jefferson G. Griffin (Republican), North Carolina District Court Judge

==== Results ====
Results by county Griffin: 50–60%; 60–70%; 70–80%; Brook: 50–60%; 60–70%; 70–80%; 80–90%

North Carolina Court of Appeals Seat 13 election, 2020
Party	Candidate	Votes	%
Republican	Jefferson G. Griffin	2,720,503	51.16%
Democratic	Christopher Brook (incumbent)	2,597,573	48.84%
Total votes		5,318,076	100.00%
