= Sandra J. Hairston =

American lawyer (born 1958)

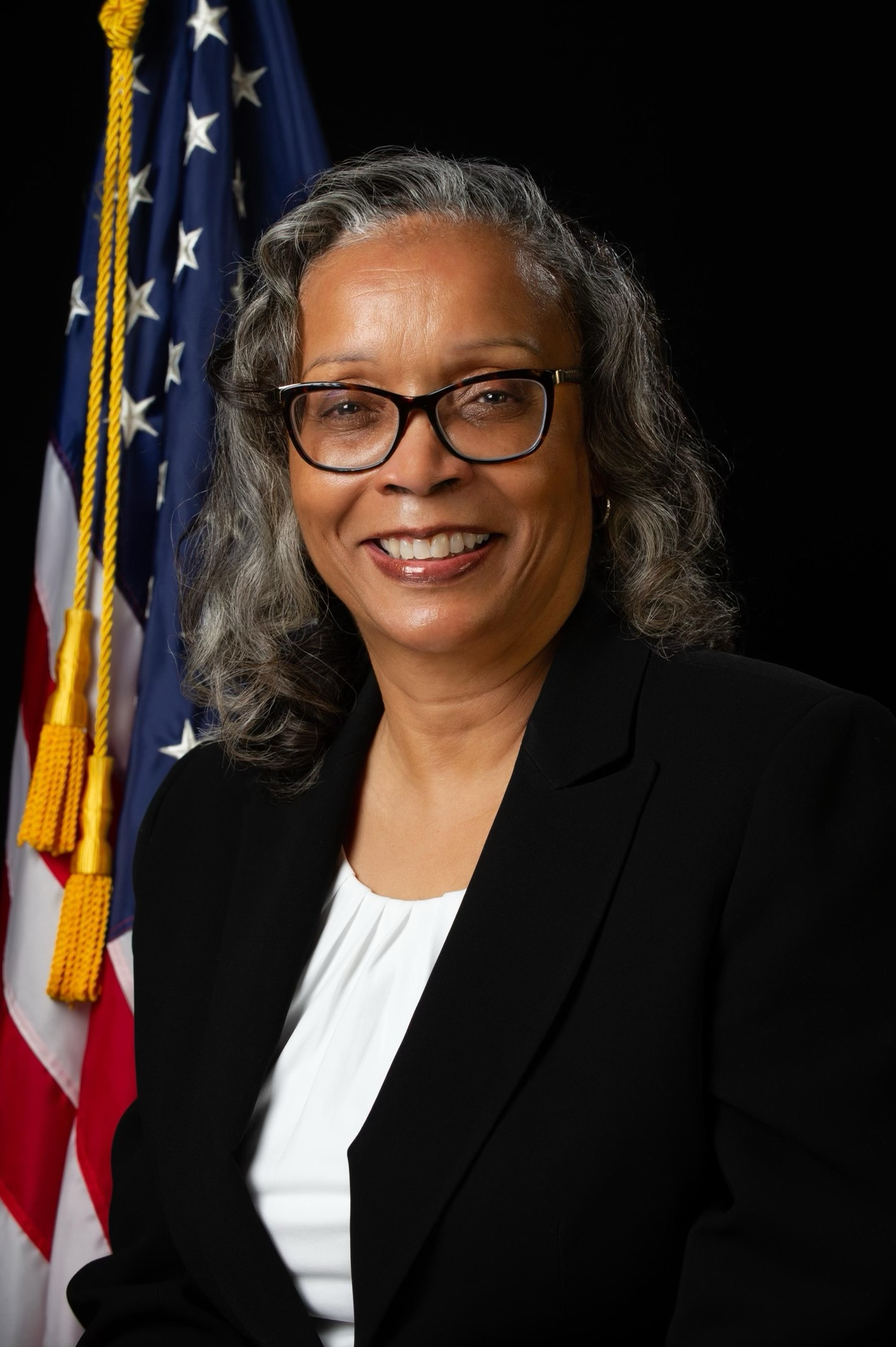

United States Attorney for the Middle District of North Carolina
- In office March 1, 2021 – January 18, 2025 (Acting: March 1, 2021 – November 23, 2021)
- President: Joe Biden
- Preceded by: Matthew Martin
- Succeeded by: Dan Bishop
- Acting
- In office January 14, 2017 – January 3, 2018
- President: Donald Trump
- Preceded by: Ripley Rand
- Succeeded by: Matthew Martin

Personal details
- Born: Sandra Jane Hairston; 1958 (age 67–68) Danbury, North Carolina, U.S.
- Education: University of North Carolina at Charlotte (BA); North Carolina Central University (JD)

Sandra Jane Hairston (born 1958) is an American lawyer who served as the United States attorney for the Middle District of North Carolina from 2021 to 2025.

== Education ==
Hairston received her Bachelor of Arts from the University of North Carolina at Charlotte in 1981 and her Juris Doctor from North Carolina Central University School of Law in 1987.

== Career ==
Hairston previously served as an assistant district attorney in Columbus County, North Carolina, from 1987 to 1989 and as a special assistant district attorney in Guilford County, North Carolina from 1989 to 1990. From 1994 to 1996, she served as chief of the criminal division of the United States Attorney's office for the Eastern District of North Carolina before returning to the Middle District of North Carolina in 1996. She joined the United States Attorney's office for the Middle District of North Carolina in 1990 as an Assistant United States Attorney. Hairston previously held the position of First Assistant United States Attorney for the Middle District of North Carolina from 2014 to 2021. From March 1, 2021, until her Senate confirmation in November 2021, she served as the acting United States Attorney for the Middle District of North Carolina. Hairston was an adjunct professor at Elon University School of Law in 2008 and again from 2010 to 2019.

=== U.S. attorney for the Middle District of North Carolina ===
Hairston served as acting U.S. attorney from January 14, 2017, to January 3, 2018. and again from March 1 to November 19, 2021.

On September 28, 2021, President Joe Biden nominated Hairston to be the United States attorney for the Middle District of North Carolina. On October 28, 2021, her nomination was favorably reported out of committee by a voice vote. On November 19, 2021, her nomination was confirmed in the United States Senate by voice vote. She was sworn into office on November 23, 2021, by Chief Judge Thomas D. Schroeder. She resigned from office January 18, 2025.

Legal offices
Preceded by Ripley Rand	United States Attorney for the Middle District of North Carolina; Acting; 2017–2018	Succeeded by Matthew Martin
Preceded by Matthew Martin	United States Attorney for the Middle District of North Carolina; 2021–2025	Succeeded by Randall S. Galyon; Acting
