= First Amendment Law Review =

- Discipline: Jurisprudence
- Language: English

Publication details
- History: 2003-present
- Publisher: University of North Carolina School of Law (United States)
- Frequency: biannually

Standard abbreviations
- ISO 4: First Amend. Law Rev.

Links
- Journal homepage; Online access

The First Amendment Law Review is a law journal published by students at the University of North Carolina School of Law. it publishes articles related to the First Amendment of the United States Constitution; its goal is the promotion and protection of rights contained in the amendment through scholarly publishing. The journal was established in 2003 and publishes three issues a year. One issue consists of articles from its annual symposium, held in the Fall. The other issues include submitted articles and notes written by staff members and professional scholars.
