= Toma Zdravkov =

Bulgarian singer

Toma Zdravkov Тома Здравков
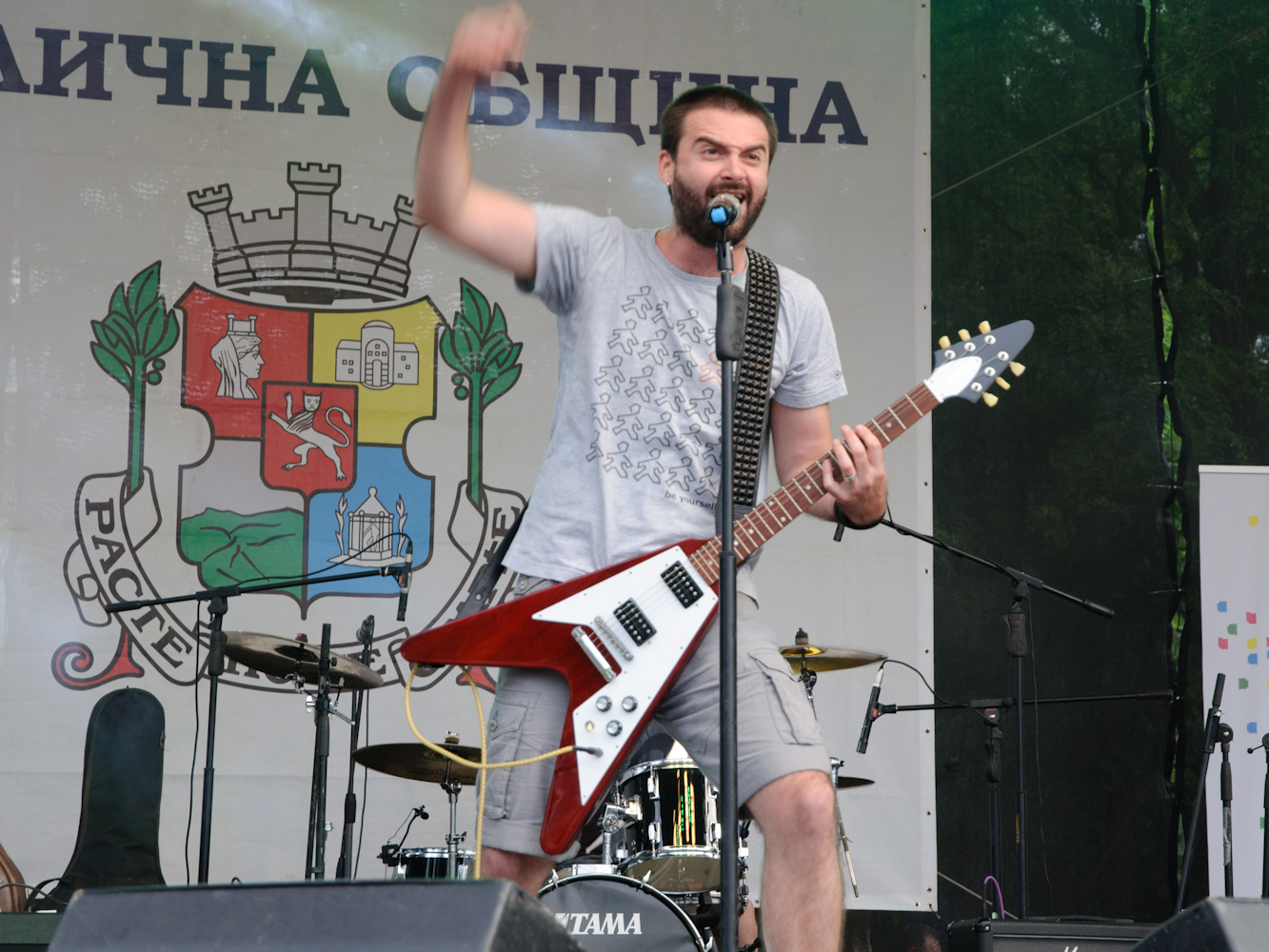

Background information
- Born: Toma Zdravkov; 24 May 1987 (age 39); Pazardzhik, Bulgaria
- Genres: Hard rock, Metal
- Occupation: Musician
- Instruments: Vocals, guitar
- Years active: 2008–present
- Label: Virginia Records

Toma Zdravkov (Bulgarian: Тома Здравков; born 24 May 1987) is a Bulgarian singer, most known for winning Music Idol, the Bulgarian version of the British hit show Pop Idol.

== Career ==
His career began in 2008 when he won the Music Idol song contest; he was the first rock singer to win it. Later this year, he released his first album, Geroi (Hero; Bulgarian: Герой), and his first single, also called "Geroi" (a cover of Thornley's So Far So Good.) On 4 July 2008, he opened for Def Leppard and Whitesnake.

In April 2009 Toma released his second single, "Niama Miasto V Teb" (There's No Space In You; Bulgarian: Няма Място В Теб).

== Discography ==
=== Geroi ===
Tracklist

1. "Niamam Vreme"
2. "Losh"
3. "Geroi"
4. "Inconsolable"
5. "Gentulmeni" (ft. Dicho)
6. "Sega Si Edna"
7. "Niama Miasto V Teb"
8. "Plastmasa"
9. "Leden Puls"
10. "Moga"
11. "Every 1's A Winner" (cover of Hot Chocolate's song)
