= Plamen Dereu =

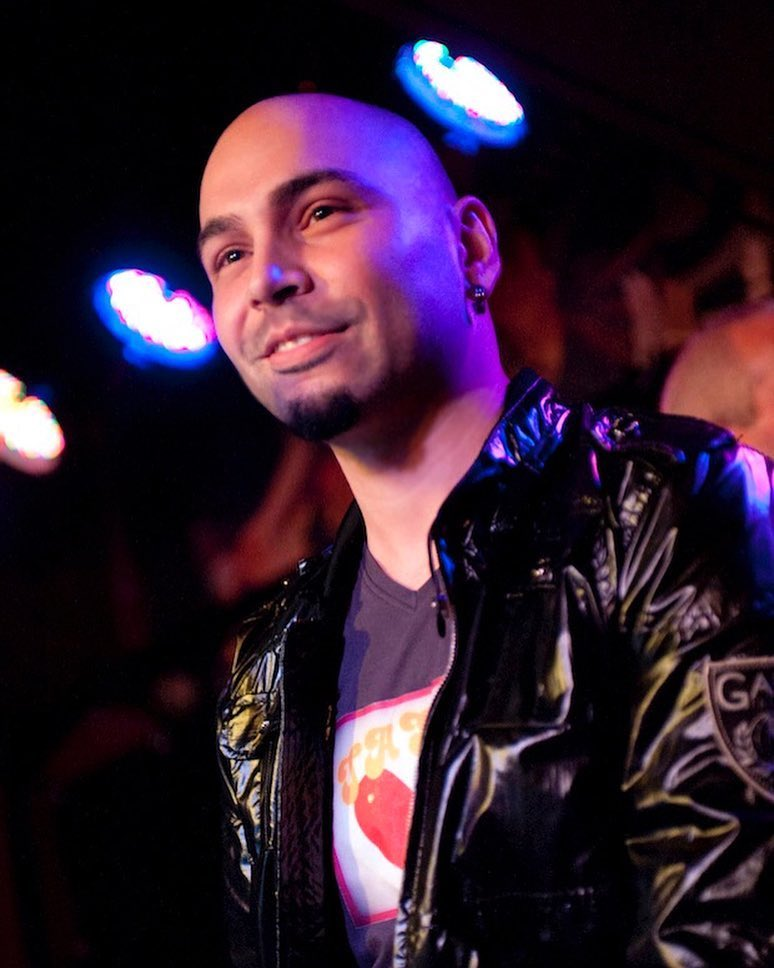
- Born: Plamen Hristov Petkov; May 4, 1984 (age 40); Veliko Tarnovo, Bulgaria
- Citizenship: Bulgaria (until 2017); Netherlands (from 2017)
- Education: Psychology - Bachelor
- Occupations: Singer; Songwriter; Record producer; Music-Video producer
- Television: Music Idol, season 3 (2009), Bulgaria
- Spouse: John Medema (m. 2012; div. 2017)
- Partner: Borislav Varadinov (2006–2009)
- Musical career
- Genres: Synth-Pop; House; R&B; Soul; Alternative
- Instrument: Vocals
- Years active: 2009–present
- Labels: Sayin' Dope
- Website: https://plamendereu.com

Plamen Christo Dereu (born Plamen Hristov Petkov; Bulgarian: Пламен Христов Петков; May 4, 1984) is a Dutch singer, songwriter and producer of Bulgarian descent.

In 2009 he became one of the 13 finalists in season 3 of the TV reality Music Idol in Bulgaria. After the show Plamen moved to The Netherlands and started writing his own songs. In 2015 he founded his label Sayin' Dope and released his debut single "Heaven After All", followed by "It's in Your Head" with Paul Mixtailes in 2016 and "Timeless" in 2017.

== Life and early career ==
=== Early life ===
Plamen was born on May 4, 1984, in the Republic of Bulgaria and given for adoption. For about a year an orphanage was his home and just before his first birthday, he joined the family of his adoptive parents Stefka Peneva Gancheva and Hristo Petkov Ganchev. Due to the law of closed adoption in Bulgaria, which protects the privacy of his biological parents, their identity, as well as his real birthplace, remain unknown. He was adopted in 1985 and registered as born in Veliko Tarnovo.

Raised in the village of Parvomaytsi, near Veliko Tarnovo, Plamen was bullied and treated like he did not belong by many of his peers. Music became his passion, love and escape from reality. He would use the money he got for a new jacket to buy cassette tapes and CD's. Locked for days in his room, Plamen submerged himself in the music of artists like Freddie Mercury, Michael Jackson, Björk and Sade, who inspired him.

Between 1997 and 2002 he studied in the Prof. Dr. Assen Zlatarov Secondary School for Foreign Languages in Veliko Tarnovo with major English and second - German. In his teen age theatre became his passion and he took part in several acting groups. In 2002 he applied for the actors class in the Krastyo Sarafov National Academy for Theatre and Film Arts, but became one of the 2 people left at the final round. He then enrolled himself in the Psychology programme at the University of Veliko Tarnovo. In 2004, Plamen switched to distance learning and moved to the capital - Sofia, working as a stage-hand in the Bulgarian Army Theatre with the ambition to apply in the NATFA again, however, he decided to focus on singing later on. He graduated with a BA in psychology in 2007.

=== 2006-2014: Car accident, Music Idol and the aftermath ===
In October 2006 Plamen and his partner at the time - the artist Borislav Varadinov were hit by a car on the streets of Sofia. It took a while for both of them to recover and at that point Plamen decided it was high time to go and chase his childhood dream of becoming a singer.

In May 2007 he started taking singing lessons from Alice Bovaryan, a professor in the National Academy of Music (Bulgaria), renowned as vocal coach in Star Academy (Bulgarian TV series), 2005. Less than a year later, in early 2008 Plamen made it to top 40 on the auditions for Season 2 of Music Idol and his first audition was aired on TV. In 2009 Plamen auditioned for Season 3 of Music Idol and this time became one of the 13 finalists and made it to the live shows. After his experience in the TV reality, Plamen decided to take a major turn in his life and moved to Rotterdam, Netherlands, where he began composing and writing his first songs.

=== 2015-present: Heaven After All, It's in Your Head and Timeless ===
In June 2015 Plamen Dereu founded his own record label Sayin' Dope and in November 2015 he released his debut single "Heaven After All" produced together with Dutch producer Laurent Beemer, professionally known as Mr. Beemer. The single has two music videos, filmed by his husband John Medema. A month later, he released "De vriendjes van 10" - a children's song, meant as a side project to help children in the primary schools in the Dutch speaking countries count and add numbers to 10. In 2016 Plamen teamed up with Paul Mixtailes and in October they released the single "It's in Your Head", the music video for which was also filmed by John Medema. In July 2017 Plamen released his single and music video for "Timeless", followed by the end of his 5-year marriage in September, when he moved to Amsterdam.

== Discography ==
=== Singles ===
- Heaven After All (2015)
- De vriendjes van 10 (2015)
- It's in Your Head (2016) - with Paul Mixtailes
- Timeless (2017)
- Mishale (2019)

=== Videos ===
- Heaven After All (2015)
- Heaven After All (DJ Moriarti Remix) (2015)
- De vriendjes van 10 (2015)
- It's in Your Head (2016) - with Paul Mixtailes
- Timeless (2017)
- Mishale (2019)

== Filmography ==
Television
Year	Title	Role	Notes
2009	Music Idol	Himself (as Plamen Petkov)	TV show, season 3
