= Ken Lee (meme) =

Bulgarian meme

"Ken Lee" (Bulgarian: Кен лий) is a 2008 internet meme which consists of a clip from the Bulgarian version of Music Idol, part of the Idol television franchise. During an audition for the talent show, contestant Valentina Hasan sings Mariah Carey's 1993 cover of "Without You" (1970). The "Ken Lee" phrase derives from her mishearing of the lyrics "I can't live". The video gained popularity within less than a week, becoming popular outside of Bulgaria.

== Valentina Hasan ==
Valentina Ivanova Kostova-Hasan (Bulgarian: Валентина Иванова Костова-Хасан; née Kostova, born in Zvezdelina) was 30 years old at the time of the audition and had been living in Spain for four years, where she worked behind the counter of a restaurant. She had been married to a Turkish-born man. Three months after moving to Spain, she learned Spanish quickly, but, as of the time of the audition, she was not fluent in English, as she took an intensive study for a short amount of time and forgot it quickly. She recorded "Without You" using a cassette recorder when she was 15 and admitted that Mariah Carey was not her favorite singer, as she preferred Bulgarian folk music. She had a daughter, Mimi, who, at the time, was age 6.

== The audition ==
In late February 2008, Hasan appeared on a series of auditions for the second season of Music Idol in Plovdiv. She told the jury that she was going to sing "a song by Mariah Carey, 'Ken Lee'", to which one of the juries, Esil Duran, corrected Hasan referring to "Without You", and, after that, she would sing "Katerino mome", a folk song from Pirin. On television, only the "Ken Lee" part of the audition aired, causing it to be shared on both YouTube and local video sharing site VBox7. Quickly, an English subtitled translation of the audition was uploaded.

Kostova-Hasan's rendition of the song was a phonetic approximation of the lyrics. Thus "I can't live if living is without you, I can't give anymore" was sung as "Ken lee tu libu dibu douchoo, ken lee meju more". The misheard lyrics gave the meme its title, Ken Lee.

Questioned by the jury on the language of "Ken Lee", she simply said that it was in English.

== Repercussion ==
By 5 March, video of the TV version of the audition was spread on YouTube, receiving more than 100,000 views and over 400 comments within less than a week, a record for a Bulgarian video at the time. By April, it had become the second most popular video on YouTube in the UK; at the time, the upload on YouTube amassed over three million views; ascending to seven million in embeds.

On 10 March, Nova TV's program Gospodari na efira featured footage of recent performances of auditions from Music Idol, all of them singing in garbled English, ending with "Ken Lee" as the highlight.

Aware of the success, Hasan did a live performance on Music Idol on 12 March, singing the entire song.

In April, Mariah Carey was invited by Canal+'s Le Grand Journal. The presenter showed the "Ken Lee" video to Carey, asking her if Valentina Hasan should get a career, to which she said that Hasan could not make a career based on her audition alone.

== References in popular culture ==
- Part of the chorus of "Ken Lee" was featured in the lyrics of Plamen Sivov's song "Tochka BG", released in January 2011.
