= Matthew Martin (lawyer) =

American attorney (born 1979)

Matthew G.T. Martin
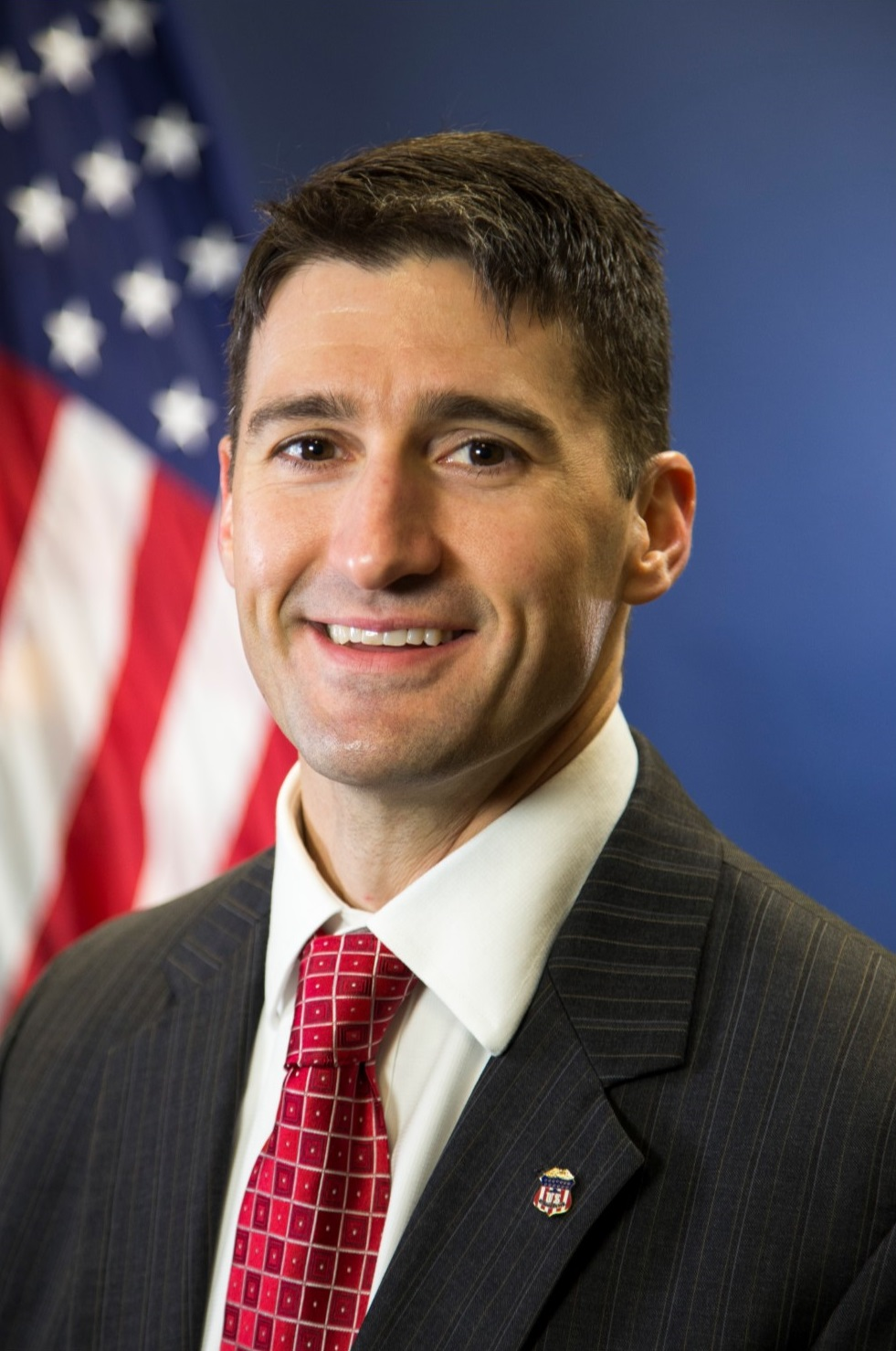

United States Attorney for the Middle District of North Carolina
- In office January 3, 2018 – February 28, 2021
- President: Donald Trump; Joe Biden
- Preceded by: Ripley Rand
- Succeeded by: Sandra J. Hairston

Personal details
- Born: 1979 (age 46–47) Wright-Patterson Air Force Base, Ohio
- Education: University of North Carolina; University of North Carolina School of Law

Matthew G.T. Martin (born 1979) is an American attorney who served as the United States Attorney for the United States District Court for the Middle District of North Carolina from 2018 to 2021. He previously served as associate general counsel for Duke Energy. Martin was a partner at the law firm of Smith Anderson Blount Dorsett Mitchell & Jernigan, where he focused on complex litigation. Prior to joining Smith Anderson, he practiced with the law firm of Covington & Burling. On November 9, 2017, he was confirmed by the United States Senate to be the United States Attorney for the United States District Court for the Middle District of North Carolina. On February 8, 2021, he along with 55 other Trump-era attorneys were asked to resign. On February 22, he submitted his resignation, effective February 28.
