= Mark A. Davis =

American judge

Mark Davis

Associate Justice of the North Carolina Supreme Court
- In office March 25, 2019 – December 31, 2020
- Appointed by: Roy Cooper
- Preceded by: Cheri Beasley
- Succeeded by: Tamara Barringer

Judge of the North Carolina Court of Appeals
- In office December 31, 2012 – March 24, 2019
- Appointed by: Bev Perdue
- Preceded by: Cheri Beasley
- Succeeded by: Reuben Young

Personal details
- Born: Mark Allen Davis; October 25, 1966 (age 59) Jacksonville, North Carolina, U.S.
- Party: Democratic
- Education: University of North Carolina, Chapel Hill (BA, JD); Duke University (LLM)

Mark Allen Davis (born October 25, 1966) is an American attorney and jurist. He has served as an associate justice of the North Carolina Supreme Court (2019-2020) and previously as a Judge of the North Carolina Court of Appeals. Davis currently serves as Special Superior Court Judge for Complex Business Cases on the North Carolina Business Court.

== Education and early career ==
Following receipt of his undergraduate degree from the University of North Carolina at Chapel Hill, Davis earned his J.D. degree from the University of North Carolina School of Law where he was a member of the North Carolina Law Review. He served as a law clerk for U.S. District Judge Franklin Dupree in the United States District Court for the Eastern District of North Carolina. From 2006 until 2011, Davis was a special deputy attorney general. He also spent 13 years in private practice.

== Judicial experience ==
Davis was appointed by Governor Bev Perdue to serve as a Judge of the North Carolina Court of Appeals, taking office in January 2013. He was appointed to fill the vacancy caused by Judge Cheri Beasley's appointment to the North Carolina Supreme Court. Davis served as Gov. Perdue's General Counsel for the last two years of her term in office.

On March 11, 2019, Governor Roy Cooper appointed Davis to again fill a seat left vacant by Cheri Beasley. After Gov. Cooper appointed Beasley as Chief Justice, he appointed Davis to fill her seat as an associate justice of the Supreme Court. In the 2020 general election, Davis lost his bid for a full term on the Supreme Court. In 2021, Governor Cooper nominated Davis for a special superior court judgeship, subject to confirmation by both houses of the state legislature.

=== Electoral history ===
==== 2020 ====
North Carolina Supreme Court (Seat 4) election, 2020
| Party | Candidate | Votes | % |
|---|---|---|---|
| Republican | Tamara Barringer | 2,746,362 | 51.21% |
| Democratic | Mark Davis (incumbent) | 2,616,265 | 48.79% |
| Total votes | | 5,362,627 | 100% |
| Republican gain from Democratic | | | |

==== 2014 ====
North Carolina Court of Appeals (Davis seat) election, 2014
| Party | Candidate | Votes | % |
|---|---|---|---|
| Nonpartisan | Mark Davis (incumbent) | 1,354,647 | 58.77% |
| Nonpartisan | Paul Holcombe | 950,300 | 41.23% |
| Total votes | | 2,304,947 | 100% |

== Writings ==
- A Warren Court of Our Own: The Exum Court and the Expansion of Individual Rights in North Carolina (Carolina Academic Press 2019)

Legal offices
| Preceded by Cheri Beasley | Associate Justice of the North Carolina Supreme Court; 2019–2020 | Succeeded by Tamara Barringer |
