= North Carolina Journal of International Law =

- Discipline: Law
- Language: English

Publication details
- Former names: North Carolina Journal of International Law and Commercial Regulation
- Frequency: Quarterly

Standard abbreviations
- ISO 4: N. C. J. Int. Law

Links
- Journal homepage

The North Carolina Journal of International Law is a student-run quarterly law journal at the University of North Carolina School of Law in Chapel Hill, North Carolina. It covers legal scholarship in the area of international and foreign law. In 2015, it shortened its name from The North Carolina Journal of International Law and Commercial Regulation in part to reflect the expansion from its original focus of commercial regulation.

== Symposiums ==
The journal hosts an annual symposium on an important issue in international law.
