= Reuben Young =

American lawyer and jurist

Reuben F. Young
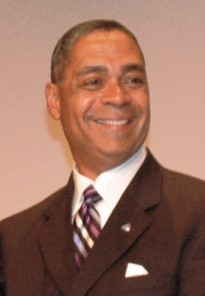
- Young in 2011

Judge of the North Carolina Court of Appeals
- In office April 30, 2019 – December 31, 2020
- Appointed by: Roy Cooper
- Preceded by: Mark Davis
- Succeeded by: Jeff Carpenter

Personal details
- Party: Democratic
- Education: Howard University; North Carolina Central University School of Law (JD)
- Profession: Lawyer, jurist

Reuben F. Young is an American lawyer and jurist. He was appointed to serve on the North Carolina Court of Appeals by Governor Roy Cooper in 2019 but lost reelection and left on December 31, 2020.

At the time of his appointment to the court, Young was Chief Deputy Secretary for Adult Corrections and Juvenile Justice at the North Carolina Department of Public Safety. He previously served for five years as a Special North Carolina Superior Court Judge and, before that, as Secretary of the North Carolina Department of Public Safety. Young also served as Chief Legal Counsel in the Office of the Governor under Mike Easley. Young received his undergraduate degree from Howard University and his Juris Doctor degree from North Carolina Central University School of Law.

== Electoral history ==
=== 2020 ===
North Carolina Court of Appeals (Seat 7) election, 2020
Party	Candidate	Votes	%
Republican	Jeff Carpenter	2,747,109	51.59%
Democratic	Reuben Young (incumbent)	2,578,035	48.41%
Total votes		5,325,144	100%
Republican gain from Democratic			

== See also ==
- List of African-American jurists
