= North Carolina Journal of Law & Technology =

- Discipline: Technology law
- Language: English

Publication details
- History: 1999–present
- Frequency: Semi-Annual

Standard abbreviations
- ISO 4: N. C. J. Law Technol.

North Carolina Journal of Law & Technology (JOLT) is a student publication of the University of North Carolina School of Law. It was founded in 1999, and focuses on the intersection between law and technology.

Published semi-annually, JOLT takes a broad view of the term "technology." As such, topics in many seemingly divergent areas of the law can qualify for publication in JOLT, provided there is some relationship to a field of technology. Recently, articles have dealt with ethics, privacy, bankruptcy, First Amendment, tax law, and criminal law, as well as more traditional "technology" areas such as copyright and patent law.

In addition to the print issues, JOLT staff writers also publish an online edition as well as a weekly blog.
