= Vili Kazasyan =

Vili Aram Kazasyan

Personal details
- Born: 8 December 1934 Sofia, Bulgaria
- Died: 12 July 2008 (aged 73) Sofia, Bulgaria
- Profession: Musician, composer, conductor, pianist

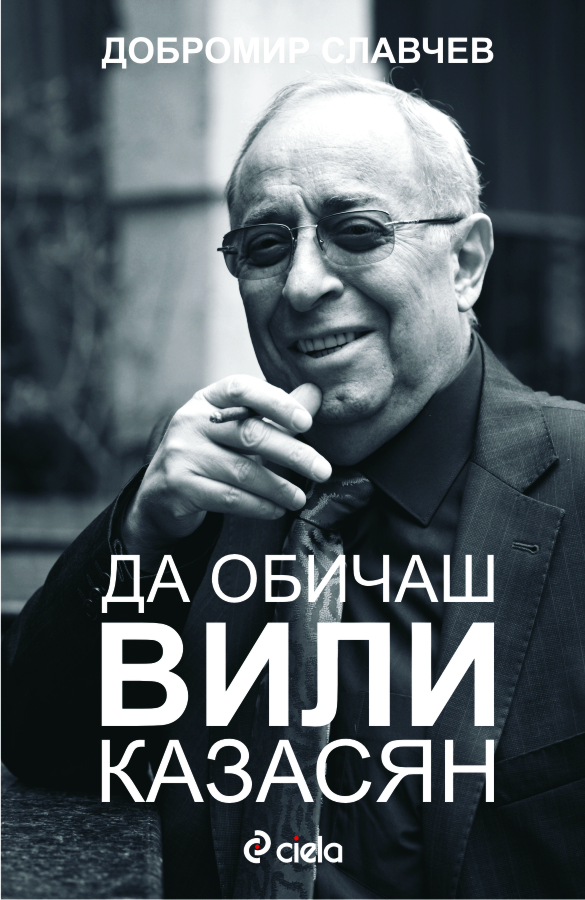
To love Villy Kazasyan by Dobromir Slavchev – Book cover, 2019

Edmond Aram Kazasyan (Bulgarian: Едмонд Арам Казасян), best known as Vili Kazasyan (Bulgarian: Вили Казасян), (8 December 1934 – 12 July 2008) was a Bulgarian jazz musician, composer, conductor and pianist from Armenian descent. He is the father of singer Hilda Kazasyan.

== Life ==
Kazasyan graduated from VMEI (the predecessor of the Technical University of Sofia) in 1957 prior to turning to music. His debut as a musician and a composer was in the 1950s – as a pianist in "Jazz of the Youth" (Bulgarian: Джаза на младите).

He was also among the initiators of the "Golden Orphey" festival (Bulgarian: фестивала "Златният Орфей").

Kazasyan has received numerous awards, including the "Sirak Skitnik" (Bulgarian: Сирак Скитник) distinction in 2005 for his general contributions to the BNR of whose big band he had been in charge for more than 30 years. In the period from 1998 to 2008 the Big Band of Vili Kazasyan was produced by the producer Dobromir Slavchev.

== Memory ==
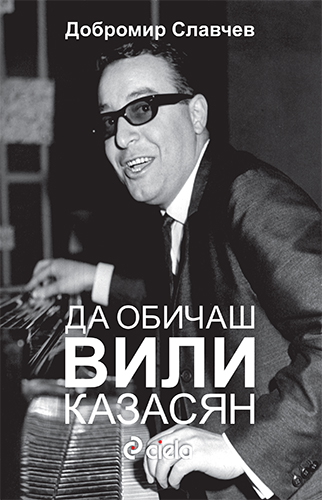
To love Villy Kazasyan by Dobromir Slavchev – Book cover, 2019

On 8 December 2019, the first official biography of the maestro of Ciela Publishing House was published with the title: "To love Villy Kazasyan" by the writer and producer Dobromir Slavchev. The book provides, in addition to the data known until then, completely new information and facts about the life and creative path of the conductor of the Big Band of the Bulgarian National Radio, and manages to bring fullness to the long career of maestro Vili Kazasyan.
