= J. Kenneth Lee =

American lawyer

J. Kenneth Lee (1923-2018) was a prominent American civil rights attorney and one of the first black students to attend the University of North Carolina at Chapel Hill's School of Law. Lee was one of four black students who joined a lawsuit in 1949 that would lead to the desegregation of the UNC School of Law.

Lee and fellow plaintiffs were represented by Thurgood Marshall in the lawsuit. Marshall was the director-counsel of the NAACP Legal Defense Fund at the time of the suit and would later become an associate justice of the United States Supreme Court.

In June 1951, Lee and four others — Harvey Beech, James Lassiter, Floyd McKissick and James Robert Walker — enrolled at the UNC School of Law, according to the university. They were the first black students to be admitted in the history of the law school, according to the university.

Lee helped to open doors for others who followed him into the law profession in that state. He was legal counsel for over seventeen hundred civil rights lawsuits, including suits to integrate public elementary and secondary schools in North Carolina, and he defended students who began the sit-in movement in Greensboro. In addition to his civil rights activities, he was a businessman who founded or helped to establish shopping centers, a nursing facility, rental and commercial property enterprises, and the state's first federally chartered savings and loan association.
