= Fred Gore =

American judge

Fred Gore is a judge of the North Carolina Court of Appeals.

Judge Gore attended the University of North Carolina at Charlotte, where he majored in Business with a concentration in Marketing and obtained his bachelor's degree in 1998. He later attended the Appalachian School of Law in Virginia and graduated with his Juris Doctor. He served in the North Carolina National Guard, including a tour of duty in the Iraq War.

After returning home to North Carolina, Gore moved to Durham, joining the Durham County District Attorney’s Office as an Assistant District Attorney and that same year he became a commissioned JAG Officer in the North Carolina National Guard. Gore later served as an assistant District Attorney in Brunswick, Bladen, and Columbus Counties, and served in the National Guard in Kuwait as a Chief Prosecutor and Office In Charge for a Brigade’s Legal Team.

In 2014, while serving as a prosecutor, Gore was elected to the state District Court bench and served Bladen, Brunswick and Columbus Counties. Judge Gore was elected to the North Carolina Court of Appeals in 2020 and started his eight-year term in January 2021.
