= University of North Carolina School of Law =

Public law school in Chapel Hill, North Carolina, US

- Parent school: University of North Carolina at Chapel Hill
- Established: 1845; 181 years ago
- School type: Public law school
- Dean: Andy Hessick
- Location: Chapel Hill, North Carolina, United States; 35°54′31.08633″N 79°2′32.73″W
- Enrollment: 572
- Faculty: 65 (full-time)
- USNWR ranking: 18th (tied) (2026)
- Bar pass rate: 92.00% (2023 first-time takers)
- Website: law.unc.edu
- ABA profile: Standard 509 Report
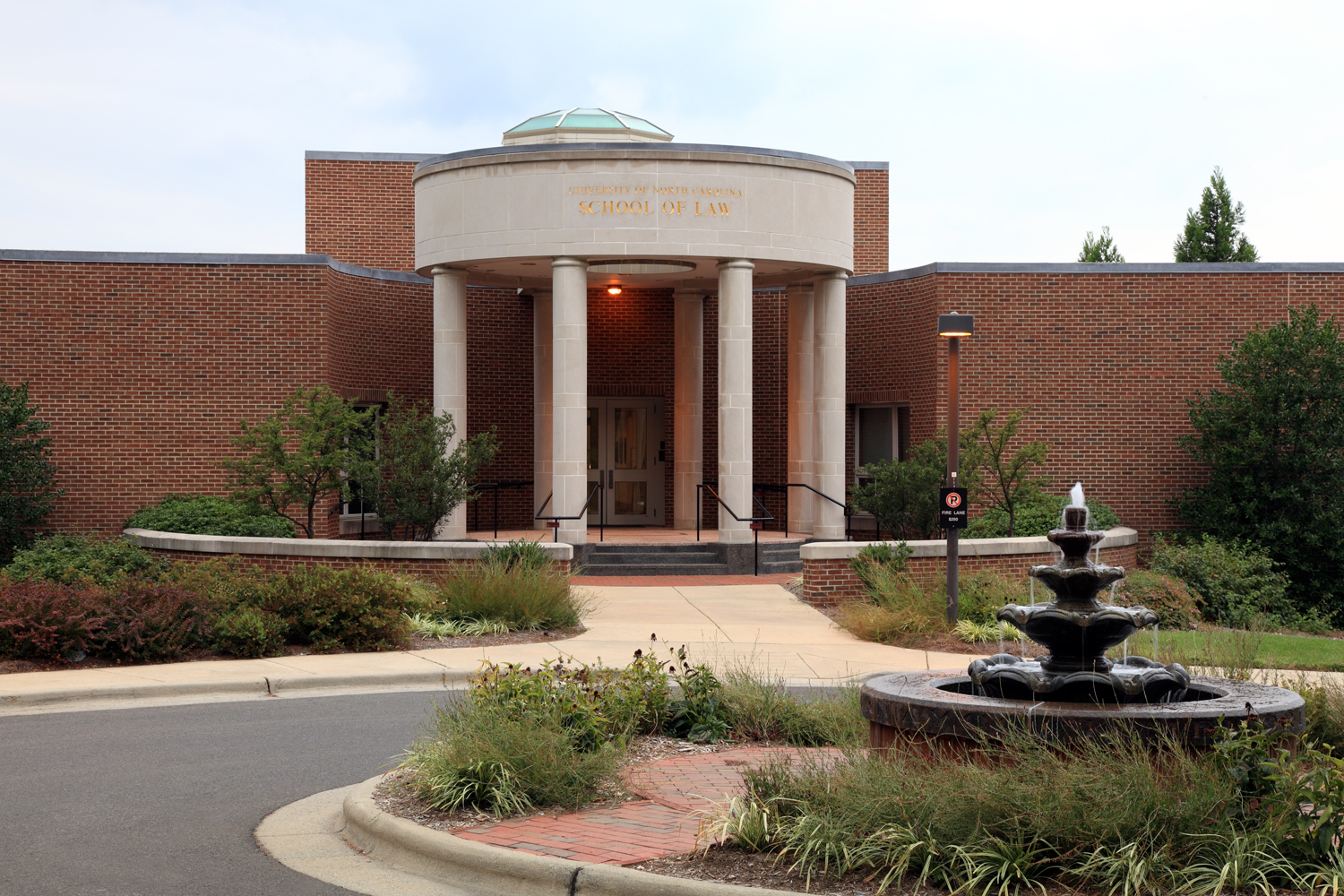

The University of North Carolina School of Law (branded as Carolina Law) is the law school of the University of North Carolina at Chapel Hill. Established in 1845, it is one of the oldest law schools in the United States and is the oldest law school and professional school in the state of North Carolina.

== History ==
=== 19th century ===
On December 12, 1842, following discussion in the North Carolina legal community, the trustees of the University of North Carolina authorized the university's president David L. Swain to review and establish a law professorship. In 1845, William Horn Battle was named the first professor of law, and legal instruction began at the university. In the years following, assistant professors and later an organized faculty and law library were added.

=== 20th century ===
In 1915, Margaret Berry became the first woman to graduate from the law school. In the 1920s, the school began taking on much of the character of a modern law school, after the American Bar Association first published guidelines for schools. University President Harry Woodburn Chase was instrumental in leading the efforts for this reorganization over notable opposition, including the governor of North Carolina.

In June 1951, Harvey Beech, James L. Lassiter, J. Kenneth Lee, Floyd McKissick, and James Robert Walker Jr. became the first five Black students enrolled at the law school, leading the integration of the University of North Carolina at Chapel Hill. McKissick and other Black students had demonstrated in court that a state law school for African Americans in Durham was not equal to that in Chapel Hill. In March 1951, a U.S. Court of Appeals agreed and ordered UNC to stop excluding Black applicants.

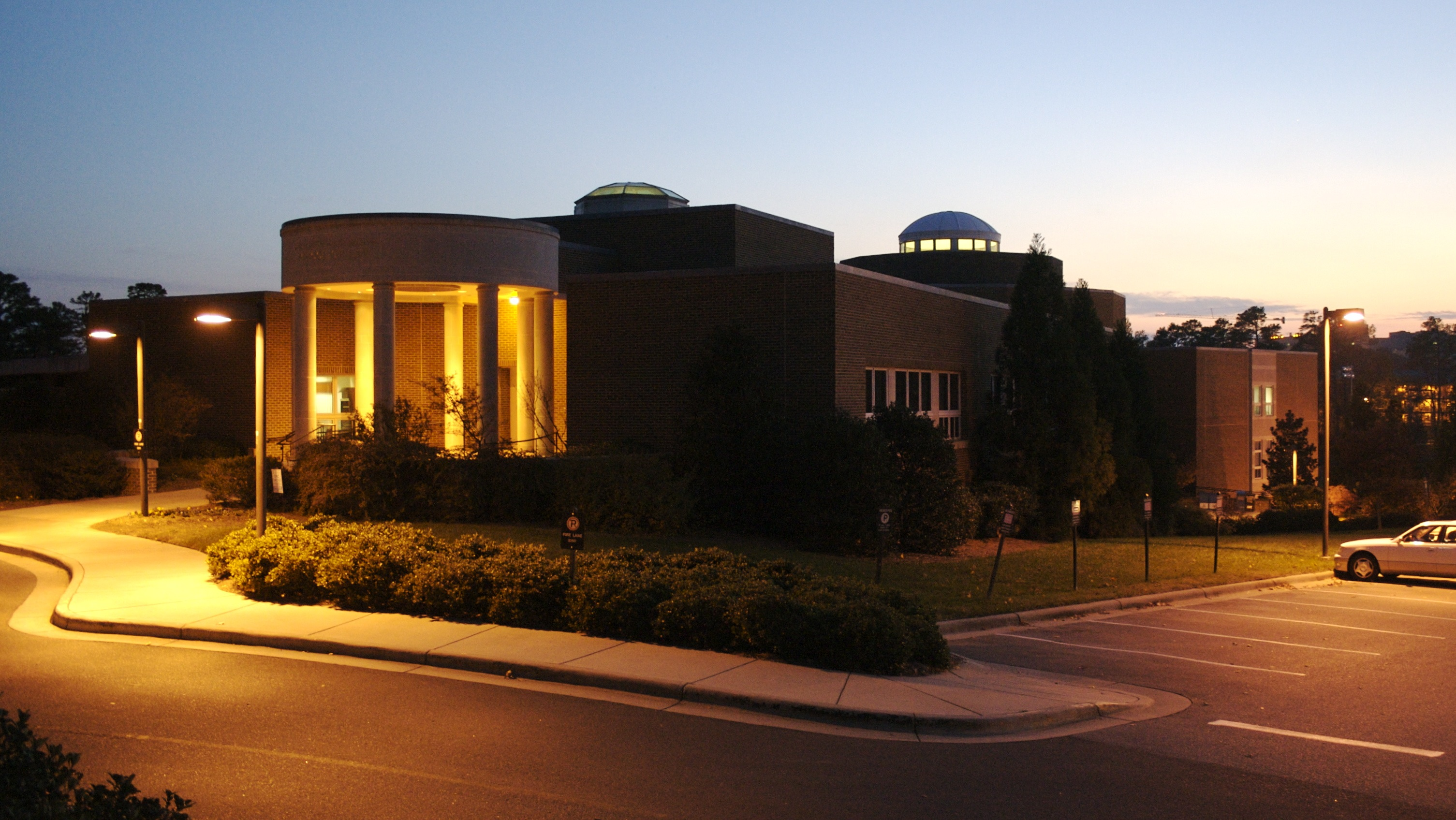
UNC Law at dusk

Upon enrollment, the Black students "immediately confronted the intense pressure of trying to succeed in a highly competitive law school while dealing daily with racial bias from the very people tasked with fostering their educational success and with the pressure of having many other people's hopes and dreams riding on them." Their first few months required a round-the-clock armed protective police escort due to Ku Klux Klan threats and other harassment, but the students sometimes received more support from their peers than the school's administration. For example, the student body voted to hold an integrated Barrister's Ball in 1952, but the university chancellor vetoed the social event.

Despite the racism and institutional challenges, Beech graduated in June 1952, "becoming the first African American graduate of the law school and UNC-Chapel Hill." In 1962, Sylvia X. Allen became the first Black female student to graduate, and did so as the mother of six children.

=== 21st century ===
As of 2023, the law school has 572 enrolled students and a student-faculty ratio of 8.8 to 1. The entering class of first-year law students in 2023 was composed of 179 students from 27 states, the District of Columbia, and Canada. Sixty percent of students were from North Carolina, and students of color made up 32.52% of the class. Sixty percent of incoming students were female, while 38% were male.

== Academics ==
=== Admissions and costs ===
For the class entering in 2025, 3,459 applicants applied for admission. 387 applicants were accepted (11.2% acceptance rate) with 181 students ultimately enrolling. The average enrollee had a 168 LSAT score and 3.89 undergraduate GPA.

The total cost of attendance, including tuition, fees, and living expenses, at UNC for the 2026-2027 academic year is $62,496 for North Carolina residents and $87,234 for out-of-state students. The Law School Transparency estimated debt-financed cost of attendance for three years is $226,013 for residents and $316,563 for nonresidents.

=== Centers and programs ===
The UNC School of Law is home to several centers that focus on issues of state and national interest:

- Center for Banking and Finance - Lissa Broome, Director
- Center for Civil Rights - Theodore Shaw, Director.
- Center for Climate, Energy, Environment & Economics - Jonas J. Monast, Director
- North Carolina Coastal Resources Law, Planning and Policy Center
- Human Rights Law Program
- UNC Center for Media Law and Policy - David Ardia, Co-Director
- Director Development Initiative
- Intellectual Property Initiative
- UNC School of Law Medical Child Abuse Initiative
- Prosecutors and Politics Project
- N.C. Poverty Research Fund
- UNC Tax Law Program

=== Clinics ===
Clinics provide students with the opportunity to learn legal theory and put the legal theory to practice.

- Civil Legal Assistance Clinic
- Community Development Law Clinic
- Criminalized Survivor, Detention, and Justice Clinic
- Economic Justice Clinic
- Family Defense Clinic
- Immigration Clinic
- Intellectual Property Clinic
- Military and Veterans Law Clinic
- Startup NC Law Clinic
- Supreme Court Clinic
- Youth Justice Clinic

=== Law journals ===
The school is home to six student-edited law journals.

- First Amendment Law Review
- North Carolina Banking Institute Journal
- North Carolina Civil Rights Law Review
- North Carolina Journal of International Law
- North Carolina Journal of Law & Technology (NC JOLT)
- North Carolina Law Review

Founded in 1922, the North Carolina Law Review is the oldest law journal in the state.

== Campus ==
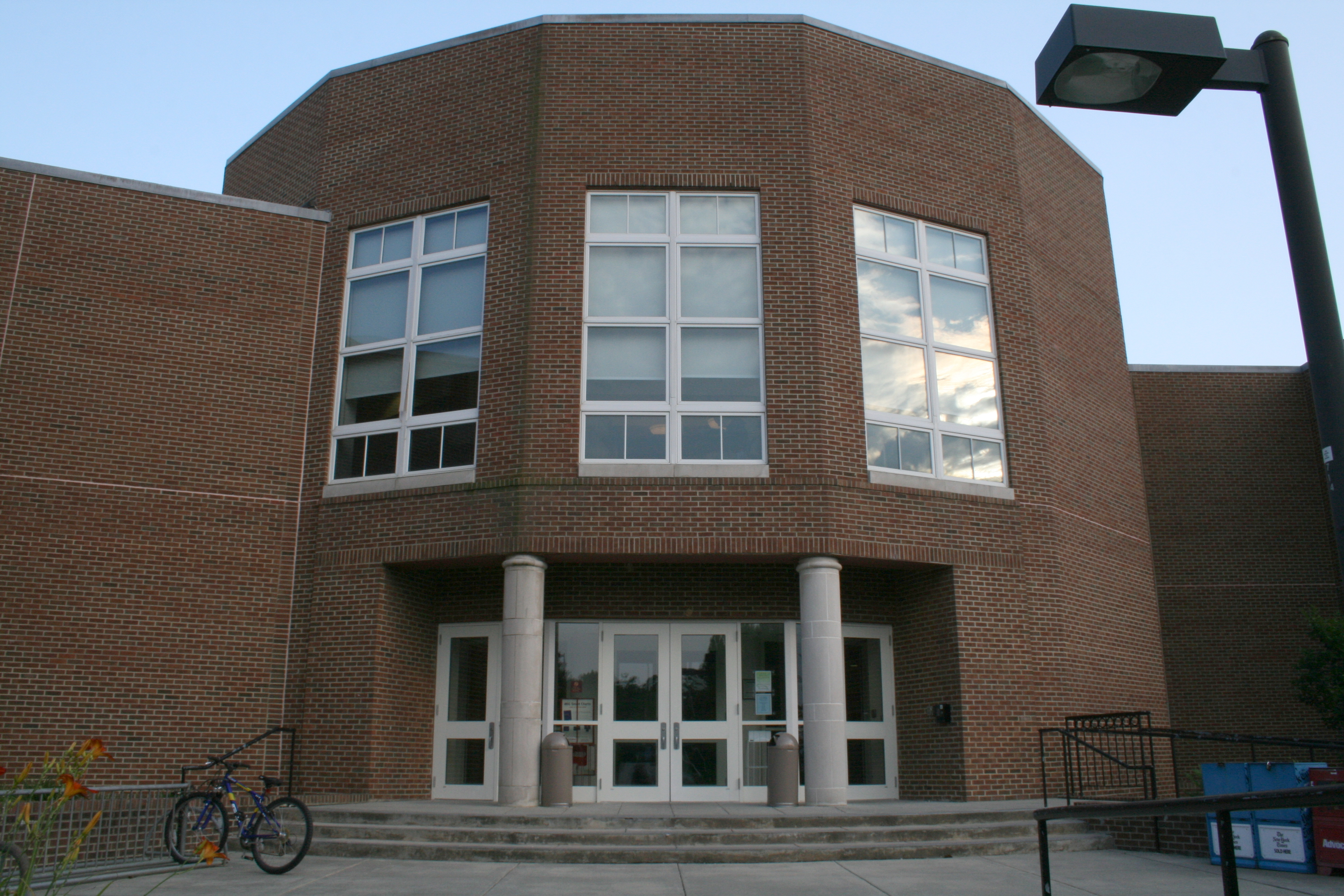
The 1999 addition to Van Hecke-Wettach Hall, commonly referred to as the rotunda

The law school is currently located in Van Hecke-Wettach Hall, towards the southeastern side of the Chapel Hill campus, neighboring the School of Government, Eddie Smith Field House, Dorrance Field, and other athletic facilities. Van Hecke-Wettach Hall is roughly a square shape with a central courtyard or quadrangle. The main entrance portico is on the northeastern side of the building, facing Ridge Road. Most of the west side of the building consists of the Kathrine R. Everett Law Library, located on the first four floors.

== Reception ==
=== Rankings ===
As of 2026, the University of North Carolina School of Law is ranked 18th (tied with Georgetown University Law Center) in the nation by U.S. News & World Report. In 2025, the University of North Carolina School of Law also ranked 18th (tied with Cornell Law School) in the nation by U.S. News & World Report.

=== Bar examination passage ===
In 2023, the overall bar examination passage rate for the law school’s first-time examination takers was 92.00%. The Ultimate Bar Pass Rate, which the ABA defines as the passage rate for graduates who sat for bar examinations within two years of graduating, was 94.33% for the class of 2021.

=== Employment ===
According to the employment disclosures required by the American Bar Association, within ten months of graduation 90% of the class of 2024 obtained full-time, long-term, JD-required employment (i.e., as attorneys) and 6.19% obtained JD advantage employment. Four students (1.90%) enrolled in further graduate studies.

== People ==
=== Notable alumni ===
There are more than 10,000 alumni of the University of North Carolina School of Law since its founding. Roughly 40 percent of practicing North Carolina attorneys are Carolina Law graduates, more than any other law school in North Carolina. Many have gone on to notable roles, including government offices, such as former US Senator and 2004 Vice Presidential candidate John Edwards, and former Chief of Staff to the President of the United States and former US Congressman, Mick Mulvaney. Additionally, many have served in positions in the North Carolina state government. Among these are the current and recent North Carolina governors (Cooper, Hunt, Holshouser, Moore, and Sanford) and (as of the 2021 term) three of seven North Carolina Supreme Court justices (Barringer, Newby, and Hudson) as well as one alumnus currently serving on the Court of Appeals of Virginia (Frucci).

=== List of deans ===
- William Horn Battle, 1845-1868; 1877-1879 (as professor of law)
- Kemp Plummer Battle, 1879-1881 (as professor of law)
- John Manning Jr., 1881-1899 (as professor of law)
- James C. MacRae, 1899-1909 (as dean)
- Lucius Polk McGehee, 1910-1923 (as dean)
- Merton Leroy Ferson, 1924-1926
- Charles T. McCormick, 1927-1931
- Maurice Taylor Van Hecke, 1931-1941
- Robert Hasley Wettach, 1941-1949
- Henry Brandis Jr., 1949-1964
- James Dickson Phillips Jr., 1964-1974
- Robert Gray Byrd, 1974-1979
- Kenneth S. Broun, 1979-1987
- Judith Welch Wegner, 1989-1999
- Gene Nichol, 1999-2005
- John "Jack" Charles Boger, 2006-2015
- Martin H. Brinkley, 2015–2025
- Andy Hessick, 2026-present
