= Martin H. Brinkley =

American lawyer

Martin Brinkley
- Born: 1966 (age 59–60); Raleigh, North Carolina U.S.
- Education: Harvard University (BA); University of North Carolina at Chapel Hill (JD)
- Occupations: Lawyer, Law professor

Martin H. Brinkley (born 1966) is an American lawyer. From 2015 to 2025, he served as the 14th Dean of the University of North Carolina School of Law. Brinkley was the first person since the nineteenth century to become dean of the UNC School of Law (founded 1845) directly from private practice. He remains on the faculty as the William Rand Kenan Jr. Distinguished Professor of Law, teaching courses in Property, Business Associations and Legal History.

== Early life and education ==
Brinkley was born in Raleigh, North Carolina, and attended local public schools. After preparing for college at Phillips Exeter Academy, he earned a B.A. in classics in three years from Harvard University, graduating summa cum laude and Phi Beta Kappa. He was Latin Orator for Harvard's 336th Commencement Exercises in 1987.

After graduate study in papyrology at the University of Cologne's Institute for Ancient Studies, Brinkley enrolled at the University of North Carolina School of Law. He earned a J.D. degree in 1992, serving as Executive Articles Editor of the North Carolina Law Review. He was admitted to practice in North Carolina that year.

== Career ==
Brinkley began his career by serving as a law clerk to Chief Judge Sam J. Ervin, III of the United States Court of Appeals for the Fourth Circuit. He then entered the practice of law in Raleigh, North Carolina, first with Moore & Van Allen, PLLC, where he became a partner in 1998, and from 2003 to 2015, with Smith, Anderson, Blount, Dorsett, Mitchell & Jernigan, LLP.

=== Community service and honors ===
Brinkley has served on the boards of or acted as pro bono counsel to many nonprofit institutions with charitable, religious, artistic and educational missions, such as the North Caroliniana Society, the North Carolina Symphony, and Saint Mary's School. In 2004 he became Vice Chancellor of the Episcopal Diocese of North Carolina and has been Chancellor since 2021. He is a former senior warden, junior warden and vestry member at Christ Church, Raleigh.

In 2011–2012 Brinkley served as president of the North Carolina Bar Association. He is an elected member of the American Law Institute and an honorary Master of the Bench of the Honourable Society of the Middle Temple.

== Personal life ==
Brinkley is an amateur oboist and pianist.
