= Ripley Rand =

American attorney

United States Attorney for the Middle District of North Carolina
- In office January 1, 2011 – January 13, 2017
- President: Barack Obama
- Succeeded by: Matthew Martin

Personal details
- Born: Ripley Eagles Rand; 1967 (age 58–59)
- Relations: Tony Rand (father)
- Education: University of North Carolina at Chapel Hill (BA, JD)

Ripley Eagles Rand (born 1967) is an American attorney who served as the United States Attorney for the Middle District of North Carolina from 2011 to 2017. President Barack Obama nominated him to the post on July 28, 2010.

== Education ==
Rand earned both Bachelor of Arts and a Juris Doctor from the University of North Carolina at Chapel Hill. He co-wrote a children's book entitled I Want to Go to UNC!

== Career ==
Prior to serving as United States Attorney, Rand was a Wake County Superior Court judge.

Rand resigned from his role as United States Attorney one week before the inauguration of Donald Trump. Rand is now a partner and criminal defense attorney at Womble Bond Dickinson in Raleigh, North Carolina.

== Personal life ==
Rand is the son of two-time state Senator Tony Rand.
