= Tamara P. Barringer =

American judge (born 1958)

Tamara Barringer
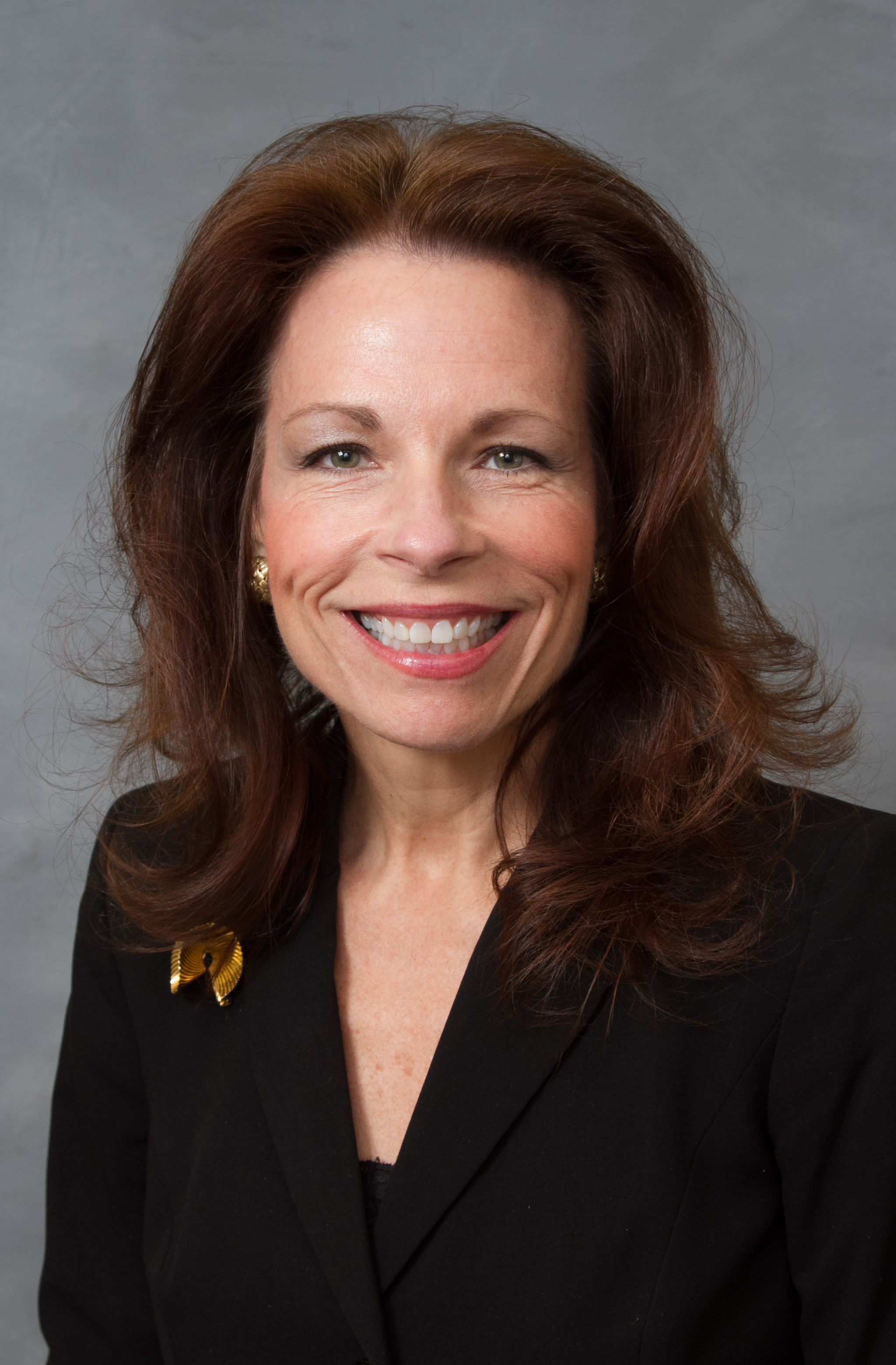

Associate Justice of the North Carolina Supreme Court
- Incumbent
- Assumed office January 1, 2021
- Preceded by: Mark A. Davis

Member of the North Carolina Senate from the 17th district
- In office October 4, 2012 – January 1, 2019
- Preceded by: Richard Stevens
- Succeeded by: Sam Searcy

Personal details
- Born: December 1, 1958 (age 67)
- Party: Republican
- Education: University of North Carolina, Chapel Hill (BS, JD)

Tamara Patterson Barringer (born December 1, 1958) is an American lawyer and judge. She is an associate justice of the North Carolina Supreme Court. She was a Republican state senator from North Carolina's 17th district for six years.

She received her Bachelor of Science in business administration and her Juris Doctor from the University of North Carolina at Chapel Hill.

== Election results ==
Barringer ran in the 2012 election for the North Carolina Senate. She defeated Erv Portman (D) in the November 2012 general election.

North Carolina Senate District 17, November 6, 2012
Party	Candidate	Votes	%
Republican	Tamara P. Barringer	57,101	53.67%
Democratic	Erv Portman	49,298	46.33%

In the November 2018 general election, she lost to Sam Searcy by a margin of 50 percent to 47 percent.

Barringer ran for the North Carolina Supreme Court in 2020 against incumbent Mark A. Davis. She won the election in November 2020.

== Awards ==
- 2015 Champion for Children Award. Presented by Children’s Hope Alliance and Benchmarks.

Legal offices
Preceded by Mark A. Davis	Associate Justice of the North Carolina Supreme Court; 2021–present	Incumbent
