= Political party strength in North Carolina =

Politics in the US state of North Carolina

The following table indicates the party of elected officials in the U.S. state of North Carolina:

- Governor
- Lieutenant Governor
- Secretary of State
- Attorney General
- Auditor
- Treasurer
- Superintendent of Public Instruction
- Commissioner of Agriculture
- Commissioner of Labor
- Commissioner of Insurance

The table also indicates the historical party composition in the:

- State Senate
- State House of Representatives
- State delegation to the U.S. Senate
- State delegation to the U.S. House of Representatives

For years in which a presidential election was held, the table indicates which party's nominees received the state's electoral votes. Bold indicates present office holders.

== 1776–1867 ==
Year	Council of State						General Assembly		United States Congress			Electoral votes
Year	Gov.	Sec. of State	Atty. Gen.	Auditor	Treasurer	Supt. of Pub. Inst.	State Senate	State House	Senator (Class II)	Senator (Class III)	House	Electoral votes
1776	Richard Caswell (I)	vacant	vacant	no such office	vacant	no such office	[?]	[?]	no such office	no such office	no such office	no such office
1777	Richard Caswell (I)	James Glasgow (I)	Waightstill Avery (I)	no such office	district system	no such office	[?]	[?]	no such office	no such office	no such office	no such office
1778	Richard Caswell (I)	James Glasgow (I)	Waightstill Avery (I)	no such office	district system	no such office	[?]	[?]	no such office	no such office	no such office	no such office
1779	Richard Caswell (I)	James Glasgow (I)	James Iredell (F)	no such office	district system	no such office	[?]	[?]	no such office	no such office	no such office	no such office
1780	Abner Nash (I)	James Glasgow (I)	James Iredell (F)	no such office	district system	no such office	[?]	[?]	no such office	no such office	no such office	no such office
1781	Thomas Burke (I)	James Glasgow (I)	James Iredell (F)	no such office	district system	no such office	[?]	[?]	no such office	no such office	no such office	no such office
1782	Alexander Martin (I)	James Glasgow (I)	James Iredell (F)	no such office	district system	no such office	[?]	[?]	no such office	no such office	no such office	no such office
1783	Alexander Martin (I)	James Glasgow (I)	Alfred Moore (F)	no such office	district system	no such office	[?]	[?]	no such office	no such office	no such office	no such office
1784	Alexander Martin (I)	James Glasgow (I)	Alfred Moore (F)	no such office	Memucan Hunt (I)	no such office	[?]	[?]	no such office	no such office	no such office	no such office
1785	Richard Caswell (I)	James Glasgow (I)	Alfred Moore (F)	no such office	Memucan Hunt (I)	no such office	[?]	[?]	no such office	no such office	no such office	no such office
1786	Richard Caswell (I)	James Glasgow (I)	Alfred Moore (F)	no such office	Memucan Hunt (I)	no such office	[?]	[?]	no such office	no such office	no such office	no such office
1787	Samuel Johnston (F)	James Glasgow (I)	Alfred Moore (F)	no such office	John Haywood (F)	no such office	[?]	[?]	no such office	no such office	no such office	no such office
1788	Samuel Johnston (F)	James Glasgow (I)	Alfred Moore (F)	no such office	John Haywood (F)	no such office	[?]	[?]	no such office	no such office	no such office	no such office
1789	Alexander Martin (AF)	James Glasgow (I)	Alfred Moore (F)	no such office	John Haywood (F)	no such office	[?]	[?]	Samuel Johnston (PA)	Benjamin Hawkins (PA)	3PA, 2AA	ineligible to participate
1790	Alexander Martin (AF)	James Glasgow (I)	Alfred Moore (F)	no such office	John Haywood (F)	no such office	[?]	[?]	Samuel Johnston (PA)	Benjamin Hawkins (PA)	3PA, 2AA	ineligible to participate
1791	Alexander Martin (AF)	James Glasgow (I)	Alfred Moore (F)	no such office	John Haywood (F)	no such office	[?]	[?]	Samuel Johnston (PA)	Benjamin Hawkins (PA)	3PA, 2AA	ineligible to participate
1792	Richard Dobbs Spaight (F)	James Glasgow (I)	John Haywood (F)	no such office	John Haywood (F)	no such office	[?]	[?]	Samuel Johnston (PA)	Benjamin Hawkins (PA)	3PA, 2AA	ineligible to participate
1793	Richard Dobbs Spaight (F)	James Glasgow (I)	John Haywood (F)	no such office	John Haywood (F)	no such office	[?]	[?]	Alexander Martin (AA)	Benjamin Hawkins (AA)	9AA, 1PA	Washington (I) ✓
1794	Richard Dobbs Spaight (F)	James Glasgow (I)	John Haywood (F)	no such office	John Haywood (F)	no such office	[?]	[?]	Alexander Martin (AA)	Benjamin Hawkins (AA)	9AA, 1PA	Washington (I) ✓
1795	Samuel Ashe (AF)	James Glasgow (I)	John Haywood (F)	no such office	John Haywood (F)	no such office	[?]	[?]	Alexander Martin (DR)	Timothy Bloodworth (DR)	9DR, 1F	Washington (I) ✓
1796	Samuel Ashe (AF)	James Glasgow (I)	Blake Baker (I)	no such office	John Haywood (F)	no such office	[?]	[?]	Alexander Martin (DR)	Timothy Bloodworth (DR)	8DR, 2F	Washington (I) ✓
1797	Samuel Ashe (AF)	James Glasgow (I)	Blake Baker (I)	no such office	John Haywood (F)	no such office	[?]	[?]	Alexander Martin (DR)	Timothy Bloodworth (DR)	9DR, 1F	Jefferson (DR) ✗
1798	William Richardson Davie (F)	William White	Blake Baker (I)	no such office	John Haywood (F)	no such office	[?]	[?]	Alexander Martin (DR)	Timothy Bloodworth (DR)	9DR, 1F	Jefferson (DR) ✗
1799	Benjamin Williams (F)	William White	Blake Baker (I)	no such office	John Haywood (F)	no such office	[?]	[?]	Jesse Franklin (DR)	Timothy Bloodworth (DR)	6DR, 4F	Jefferson (DR) ✗
1800	Benjamin Williams (F)	William White	Blake Baker (I)	no such office	John Haywood (F)	no such office	[?]	[?]	Jesse Franklin (DR)	Timothy Bloodworth (DR)	6DR, 4F	Jefferson (DR) ✗
1801	Benjamin Williams (F)	William White	Blake Baker (I)	no such office	John Haywood (F)	no such office	[?]	[?]	Jesse Franklin (DR)	David Stone (DR)	6DR, 4F	Jefferson (DR) ✓
1802	James Turner (DR) (Note: John Baptista Ashe was elected in 1802 to succeed Williams but died before he could take office, leading the legislature to elect Turner.)	William White	Blake Baker (I)	no such office	John Haywood (F)	no such office	[?]	[?]	Jesse Franklin (DR)	David Stone (DR)	6DR, 4F	Jefferson (DR) ✓
1803	James Turner (DR)	William White	Henry Seawell (DR)	no such office	John Haywood (F)	no such office	[?]	[?]	Jesse Franklin (DR)	David Stone (DR)	11DR, 1F	Jefferson (DR) ✓
1804	James Turner (DR)	William White	Henry Seawell (DR)	no such office	John Haywood (F)	no such office	[?]	[?]	Jesse Franklin (DR)	David Stone (DR)	11DR, 1F	Jefferson (DR) ✓
1805	Nathaniel Alexander (DR)	William White	Henry Seawell (DR)	no such office	John Haywood (F)	no such office	[?]	[?]	James Turner (DR)	David Stone (DR)	12DR	Jefferson/ Clinton (DR) ✓
1806	Nathaniel Alexander (DR)	William White	Henry Seawell (DR)	no such office	John Haywood (F)	no such office	[?]	[?]	James Turner (DR)	David Stone (DR)	12DR	Jefferson/ Clinton (DR) ✓
1807	Benjamin Williams (F)	William White	Henry Seawell (DR)	no such office	John Haywood (F)	no such office	[?]	[?]	James Turner (DR)	Jesse Franklin (DR)	11DR, 1F	Jefferson/ Clinton (DR) ✓
1808	David Stone (DR)	William White	Oliver Fitts (DR)	no such office	John Haywood (F)	no such office	[?]	[?]	James Turner (DR)	Jesse Franklin (DR)	11DR, 1F	Jefferson/ Clinton (DR) ✓
1809	David Stone (DR)	William White	Oliver Fitts (DR)	no such office	John Haywood (F)	no such office	[?]	[?]	James Turner (DR)	Jesse Franklin (DR)	9DR, 3F	Madison/ Clinton (DR) ✓
1810	Benjamin Smith (DR)	William White	William Miller (DR)	no such office	John Haywood (F)	no such office	[?]	[?]	James Turner (DR)	Jesse Franklin (DR)	9DR, 3F	Madison/ Clinton (DR) ✓
1811	William Hawkins (DR)	William Hill (DR)	Hutchins Gordon Burton (F)	no such office	John Haywood (F)	no such office	[?]	[?]	James Turner (DR)	Jesse Franklin (DR)	10DR, 2F	Madison/ Clinton (DR) ✓
1812	William Hawkins (DR)	William Hill (DR)	Hutchins Gordon Burton (F)	no such office	John Haywood (F)	no such office	[?]	[?]	James Turner (DR)	Jesse Franklin (DR)	10DR, 2F	Madison/ Clinton (DR) ✓
1813	William Hawkins (DR)	William Hill (DR)	Hutchins Gordon Burton (F)	no such office	John Haywood (F)	no such office	[?]	[?]	James Turner (DR)	David Stone (DR)	10DR, 3F	Madison/ Gerry (DR) ✓
1814	William Miller (DR)	William Hill (DR)	Hutchins Gordon Burton (F)	no such office	John Haywood (F)	no such office	[?]	[?]	James Turner (DR)	David Stone (DR)	10DR, 3F	Madison/ Gerry (DR) ✓
1815	William Miller (DR)	William Hill (DR)	Hutchins Gordon Burton (F)	no such office	John Haywood (F)	no such office	[?]	[?]	James Turner (DR)	Nathaniel Macon (DR)	11DR, 2F	Madison/ Gerry (DR) ✓
1816	William Miller (DR)	William Hill (DR)	Hutchins Gordon Burton (F)	no such office	John Haywood (F)	no such office	[?]	[?]	Montfort Stokes (DR)	Nathaniel Macon (DR)	11DR, 2F	Madison/ Gerry (DR) ✓
1817	John Branch (DR)	William Hill (DR)	William P. Drew (DR)	no such office	John Haywood (F)	no such office	[?]	[?]	Montfort Stokes (DR)	Nathaniel Macon (DR)	11DR, 2F	Monroe/ Tompkins (DR) ✓
1818	John Branch (DR)	William Hill (DR)	William P. Drew (DR)	no such office	John Haywood (F)	no such office	[?]	[?]	Montfort Stokes (DR)	Nathaniel Macon (DR)	11DR, 2F	Monroe/ Tompkins (DR) ✓
1819	John Branch (DR)	William Hill (DR)	William P. Drew (DR)	no such office	John Haywood (F)	no such office	[?]	[?]	Montfort Stokes (DR)	Nathaniel Macon (DR)	10DR, 3F	Monroe/ Tompkins (DR) ✓
1820	Jesse Franklin (DR)	William Hill (DR)	William P. Drew (DR)	no such office	John Haywood (F)	no such office	[?]	[?]	Montfort Stokes (DR)	Nathaniel Macon (DR)	10DR, 3F	Monroe/ Tompkins (DR) ✓
1821	Gabriel Holmes (DR)	William Hill (DR)	William P. Drew (DR)	no such office	John Haywood (F)	no such office	[?]	[?]	Montfort Stokes (DR)	Nathaniel Macon (DR)	13DR	Monroe/ Tompkins (DR) ✓
1822	Gabriel Holmes (DR)	William Hill (DR)	William P. Drew (DR)	no such office	John Haywood (F)	no such office	[?]	[?]	Montfort Stokes (DR)	Nathaniel Macon (DR)	13DR	Monroe/ Tompkins (DR) ✓
1823	Gabriel Holmes (DR)	William Hill (DR)	William P. Drew (DR)	no such office	John Haywood (F)	no such office	[?]	[?]	John Branch (DR)	Nathaniel Macon (DR)	12DR, 1F	Monroe/ Tompkins (DR) ✓
1824	Hutchins Gordon Burton (DR)	William Hill (DR)	William P. Drew (DR)	no such office	John Haywood (F)	no such office	[?]	[?]	John Branch (DR)	Nathaniel Macon (DR)	12DR, 1F	Monroe/ Tompkins (DR) ✓
1825	Hutchins Gordon Burton (DR)	William Hill (DR)	James F. Taylor (F)	no such office	John Haywood (F)	no such office	[?]	[?]	John Branch (J)	Nathaniel Macon (J)	12J, 1NR	Jackson/ Calhoun (DR) ✗
1826	Hutchins Gordon Burton (DR)	William Hill (DR)	James F. Taylor (F)	no such office	John Haywood (F)	no such office	[?]	[?]	John Branch (J)	Nathaniel Macon (J)	12J, 1NR	Jackson/ Calhoun (DR) ✗
1827	James Iredell Jr. (DR)	William Hill (DR)	James F. Taylor (F)	no such office	William S. Robards	no such office	[?]	[?]	John Branch (J)	Nathaniel Macon (J)	8J, 5NR	Jackson/ Calhoun (DR) ✗
1828	John Owen (D)	William Hill (I)	Robert H. Jones (I)	no such office	William S. Robards	no such office	[?]	[?]	John Branch (J)	Nathaniel Macon (J)	8J, 5NR	Jackson/ Calhoun (DR) ✗
1829	John Owen (D)	William Hill (I)	Romulus M. Saunders (D)	no such office	William S. Robards	no such office	[?]	[?]	Bedford Brown (J)	James Iredell Jr. (J)	9J, 4NR	Jackson/ Calhoun (D) ✓
1830	Montfort Stokes (D)	William Hill (I)	Romulus M. Saunders (D)	no such office	William S. Robards	no such office	[?]	[?]	Bedford Brown (J)	James Iredell Jr. (J)	9J, 4NR	Jackson/ Calhoun (D) ✓
1831	Montfort Stokes (D)	William Hill (I)	Romulus M. Saunders (D)	no such office	William S. Mhoon	no such office	[?]	[?]	Bedford Brown (J)	Willie P. Mangum (J)	10J, 3NR	Jackson/ Calhoun (D) ✓
1832	David L. Swain (NR)	William Hill (I)	Romulus M. Saunders (D)	no such office	William S. Mhoon	no such office	[?]	[?]	Bedford Brown (J)	Willie P. Mangum (J)	10J, 3NR	Jackson/ Calhoun (D) ✓
1833	David L. Swain (NR)	William Hill (I)	Romulus M. Saunders (D)	no such office	William S. Mhoon	no such office	[?]	[?]	Bedford Brown (J)	Willie P. Mangum (NR)	7NR, 6J	Jackson/ Van Buren (D) ✓
1834	David L. Swain (NR)	William Hill (I)	Romulus M. Saunders (D)	no such office	William S. Mhoon	no such office	[?]	[?]	Bedford Brown (J)	Willie P. Mangum (NR)	7NR, 6J	Jackson/ Van Buren (D) ✓
1835	Richard D. Spaight Jr. (D)	William Hill (I)	John R. J. Daniel (D)	no such office	Samuel F. Patterson (W)	no such office	[?]	[?]	Bedford Brown (J)	Willie P. Mangum (NR)	7NR, 6J	Jackson/ Van Buren (D) ✓
1836	Edward Bishop; Dudley (W)	William Hill (I)	John R. J. Daniel (D)	no such office	Samuel F. Patterson (W)	no such office	33D, 30W, 2?	68W, 64D, 4?, 1 vac. (Note: Elected William Henry Haywood Jr., a Democrat, as a minority-party Speaker.)	Bedford Brown (J)	vacant	7NR, 6J	Jackson/ Van Buren (D) ✓
1836	Edward Bishop; Dudley (W)	William Hill (I)	John R. J. Daniel (D)	no such office	Samuel F. Patterson (W)	no such office	33D, 30W, 2?	68W, 64D, 4?, 1 vac.	Bedford Brown (J)	Robert Strange (J)	7NR, 6J	Jackson/ Van Buren (D) ✓
1837	Edward Bishop; Dudley (W)	William Hill (I)	John R. J. Daniel (D)	no such office	Daniel W. Courts (D)	no such office	26W, 24D	62D, 58W	Bedford Brown (D)	Robert Strange (D)	8W, 5D	Van Buren/ Johnson (D) ✓
1838	Edward Bishop; Dudley (W)	William Hill (I)	John R. J. Daniel (D)	no such office	Daniel W. Courts (D)	no such office	26W, 24D	62D, 58W	Bedford Brown (D)	Robert Strange (D)	8W, 5D	Van Buren/ Johnson (D) ✓
1839	Edward Bishop; Dudley (W)	William Hill (I)	John R. J. Daniel (D)	no such office	Charles L. Hinton	no such office	27W, 23D	66W, 54D	Bedford Brown (D)	Robert Strange (D)	7D, 6W	Van Buren/ Johnson (D) ✓
1840	Edward Bishop; Dudley (W)	William Hill (I)	John R. J. Daniel (D)	no such office	Charles L. Hinton	no such office	27W, 23D	66W, 54D	Willie P. Mangum (W)	Robert Strange (D)	7D, 6W	Van Buren/ Johnson (D) ✓
1841	John Motley; Morehead (W)	William Hill (I)	Hugh McQueen (W)	no such office	Charles L. Hinton	no such office	28W, 22D	75W, 45D	Willie P. Mangum (W)	William A. Graham (W)	8W, 5D	Harrison/ Tyler (W) ✓
1842	John Motley; Morehead (W)	William Hill (I)	Spier Whitaker (D)	no such office	Charles L. Hinton	no such office	28W, 22D	75W, 45D	Willie P. Mangum (W)	William A. Graham (W)	8W, 5D	Harrison/ Tyler (W) ✓
1843	John Motley; Morehead (W)	William Hill (I)	Spier Whitaker (D)	no such office	John H. Wheeler (D)	no such office	30W, 20D	67D, 53W	Willie P. Mangum (W)	William Henry; Haywood Jr. (D)	6D, 3W	Harrison/ Tyler (W) ✓
1844	John Motley; Morehead (W)	William Hill (I)	Spier Whitaker (D)	no such office	John H. Wheeler (D)	no such office	30W, 20D	67D, 53W	Willie P. Mangum (W)	William Henry; Haywood Jr. (D)	6D, 3W	Harrison/ Tyler (W) ✓
1845	William A. Graham (W)	William Hill (I)	Spier Whitaker (D)	no such office	Charles L. Hinton	no such office	25W, 25D (Note: A power-sharing agreement between the parties was negotiated, with Burgess Sidney Gaither, a Whig, assuming the Senate Presidency, while the Democrats retained the Senate staff.)	70W, 50D	Willie P. Mangum (W)	William Henry; Haywood Jr. (D)	6D, 3W	Clay/ Frelinghuysen (W) ✗
1846	William A. Graham (W)	William Hill (I)	Spier Whitaker (D)	no such office	Charles L. Hinton	no such office	25W, 25D	70W, 50D	Willie P. Mangum (W)	William Henry; Haywood Jr. (D)	6D, 3W	Clay/ Frelinghuysen (W) ✗
1847	William A. Graham (W)	William Hill (I)	Edward Stanly (W)	no such office	Charles L. Hinton	no such office	27W, 23D	65W, 55D	Willie P. Mangum (W)	George E. Badger (W)	5W, 4D	Clay/ Frelinghuysen (W) ✗
1848	William A. Graham (W)	William Hill (I)	Edward Stanly (W)	no such office	Charles L. Hinton	no such office	27W, 23D	65W, 55D	Willie P. Mangum (W)	George E. Badger (W)	5W, 4D	Clay/ Frelinghuysen (W) ✗
1849	Charles Manly (W)	William Hill (I)	Bartholomew F. Moore (W)	no such office	Charles L. Hinton	no such office	25D, 25W (Note: A power-sharing agreement between the parties was negotiated, with Calvin Graves, a Democrat, assuming the Senate Presidency, while the Whigs retained most of the Senate staff.)	62W, 58D	Willie P. Mangum (W)	George E. Badger (W)	5W, 4D	Taylor/ Fillmore (W) ✓
1850	Charles Manly (W)	William Hill (I)	Bartholomew F. Moore (W)	no such office	Charles L. Hinton	no such office	25D, 25W	62W, 58D	Willie P. Mangum (W)	George E. Badger (W)	5W, 4D	Taylor/ Fillmore (W) ✓
1851	David Settle Reid (D)	William Hill (I)	William Eaton Jr. (D)	no such office	Daniel W. Courts (D)	no such office	27D, 23W	65D, 55W	Willie P. Mangum (W)	George E. Badger (W)	5W, 4D	Taylor/ Fillmore (W) ✓
1852	David Settle Reid (D)	William Hill (I)	William Eaton Jr. (D)	no such office	Daniel W. Courts (D)	no such office	27D, 23W	65D, 55W	Willie P. Mangum (W)	George E. Badger (W)	5W, 4D	Taylor/ Fillmore (W) ✓
1853	David Settle Reid (D)	William Hill (I)	Matt W. Ransom (D)	no such office	Daniel W. Courts (D)	Calvin H. Wiley (W)	28D, 22W	62W, 58D	vacant	George E. Badger (W)	4D, 3W	Pierce/ King (D) ✓
1854	Warren Winslow (D)	William Hill (I)	Matt W. Ransom (D)	no such office	Daniel W. Courts (D)	Calvin H. Wiley (W)	28D, 22W	62W, 58D	David Reid (D)	George E. Badger (W)	4D, 3W	Pierce/ King (D) ✓
1855	Thomas Bragg (D)	William Hill (I)	Joseph B. Batchelor (D)	no such office	Daniel W. Courts (D)	Calvin H. Wiley (W)	30D, 20W	63D, 57W	David Reid (D)	Asa Biggs (D)	5D, 3KN	Pierce/ King (D) ✓
1856	Thomas Bragg (D)	William Hill (I)	Joseph B. Batchelor (D)	no such office	Daniel W. Courts (D)	Calvin H. Wiley (W)	30D, 20W	63D, 57W	David Reid (D)	Asa Biggs (D)	5D, 3KN	Pierce/ King (D) ✓
1857	Thomas Bragg (D)	Rufus H. Page (D)	William H. Bailey (D)	no such office	Daniel W. Courts (D)	Calvin H. Wiley (W)	33D, 17KN+W	80D, 40KN+W	David Reid (D)	Asa Biggs (D)	7D, 1KN	Buchanan/ Breckinridge (D) ✓
1858	Thomas Bragg (D)	Rufus H. Page (D)	William A. Jenkins (D)	no such office	Daniel W. Courts (D)	Calvin H. Wiley (W)	33D, 17KN+W	80D, 40KN+W	David Reid (D)	Thomas L. Clingman (D)	7D, 1KN	Buchanan/ Breckinridge (D) ✓
1859	John Willis Ellis (D)	Rufus H. Page (D)	William A. Jenkins (D)	no such office	Daniel W. Courts (D)	Calvin H. Wiley (W)	32D, 18O	82D, 38O	Thomas Bragg (D)	Thomas L. Clingman (D)	5D, 3O	Buchanan/ Breckinridge (D) ✓
1860	John Willis Ellis (D)	Rufus H. Page (D)	William A. Jenkins (D)	no such office	Daniel W. Courts (D)	Calvin H. Wiley (W)	32D, 18O	82D, 38O	Thomas Bragg (D)	Thomas L. Clingman (D)	5D, 3O	Buchanan/ Breckinridge (D) ✓
1861	Henry Toole Clark (D)	Rufus H. Page (D)	William A. Jenkins (D)	no such office	Daniel W. Courts (D)	Calvin H. Wiley (W)	31D, 19W+O	64D, 56W+O	Thomas Bragg (D)	Thomas L. Clingman (D)		Breckinridge/ Lane (SD) ✗
1862	Zebulon Vance (C) (Note: The Conservative Party was a state coalition which, during the Civil War, included most Whigs and formerly Unionist Democrats in opposition to secessionsts; postwar, the Conservative Party was in opposition to Republicans and shifted its coalition to be mostly Democrats with some conservative former Whigs. Eventually it changed its name to the modern NC Democratic Party.)	John P. H. Russ (C)	William A. Jenkins (D)	Richard H. Battle (D)	Daniel W. Courts (D)	Calvin H. Wiley (W)	31D, 19W+O	64D, 56W+O	vacant	vacant		Breckinridge/ Lane (SD) ✗
1863	Zebulon Vance (C)	John P. H. Russ (C)	Sion H. Rogers (C)	Richard H. Battle (D)	Jonathan Worth (C)	Calvin H. Wiley (W)	American Civil War		vacant	vacant		Breckinridge/ Lane (SD) ✗
1864	Zebulon Vance (C)	Charles R. Thomas (C)	Sion H. Rogers (C)	Samuel F. Phillips (C)	Jonathan Worth (C)	Calvin H. Wiley (W)	American Civil War		vacant	vacant		Breckinridge/ Lane (SD) ✗
1865	William Woods Holden (NU) (Note: Provisional governor appointed by President Andrew Johnson until a special election could be held.)	Robert W. Best (C)	Sion H. Rogers (C)	Samuel F. Phillips (C)	William Sloan (NU)	Calvin H. Wiley (W)	American Civil War		vacant	vacant		ineligible to participate
1866	Jonathan Worth (C)	Robert W. Best (C)	Sion H. Rogers (C)	vacant	Kemp P. Battle (C)	Calvin H. Wiley (W)	50NP	120NP	vacant	vacant		ineligible to participate
1867	Jonathan Worth (C)	Robert W. Best (C)	Sion H. Rogers (C)	vacant	Kemp P. Battle (C)	office abolished	40R, 10C	66R, 54C	vacant	vacant		ineligible to participate

== 1868–present ==
Year	Council of State										General Assembly		United States Congress			Electoral votes
Year	Gov.	Lt. Gov.	Sec. of State	Atty. Gen.	Auditor	Treasurer	Supt. of Pub. Inst.	Comm. of Ag.	Comm. of Labor	Comm. of Ins.	State Senate	State House	Senator (Class II)	Senator (Class III)	House	Electoral votes
1868	William Woods Holden (R)	Tod Robinson Caldwell (R)	Henry J. Menninger (R)	William M. Coleman (R)	Henderson Adams (R)	David A. Jenkins (R)	Samuel S. Ashley (R)	no such office	no such office	no such office	40R, 10C	66R, 54C	Joseph Carter Abbott (R)	John Pool (R)	6R, 1Cons	
1869	William Woods Holden (R)	Tod Robinson Caldwell (R)	Henry J. Menninger (R)	Lewis P. Olds (R)	Henderson Adams (R)	David A. Jenkins (R)	Samuel S. Ashley (R)	no such office	no such office	no such office	38R, 12C	82R, 38C	Joseph Carter Abbott (R)	John Pool (R)	6R, 1D	Grant/ Colfax (R) ✓
1870	Tod Robinson Caldwell (R)	Tod Robinson Caldwell (R)	Henry J. Menninger (R)	William M. Shipp (C)	Henderson Adams (R)	David A. Jenkins (R)	Samuel S. Ashley (R)	no such office	no such office	no such office	38R, 12C	82R, 38C	Joseph Carter Abbott (R)	John Pool (R)	6R, 1D	Grant/ Colfax (R) ✓
1871	Tod Robinson Caldwell (R)	Tod Robinson Caldwell (R)	Henry J. Menninger (R)	William M. Shipp (C)	Henderson Adams (R)	David A. Jenkins (R)	Alexander McIver (R)	no such office	no such office	no such office	36C, 14R	75C, 42R, 3I	vacant	John Pool (R)	5D, 2R	Grant/ Colfax (R) ✓
1872	Tod Robinson Caldwell (R)	vacant	Henry J. Menninger (R)	William M. Shipp (C)	Henderson Adams (R)	David A. Jenkins (R)	Alexander McIver (R)	no such office	no such office	no such office	36C, 14R	75C, 42R, 3I	Matt W. Ransom (D)	John Pool (R)	5D, 2R	Grant/ Colfax (R) ✓
1873	Tod Robinson Caldwell (R)	Curtis Hooks Brogden (R)	William H. Howerton (R)	Tazewell L. Hargrove (R)	John Reilly (R)	David A. Jenkins (R)	Alexander McIver (R)	no such office	no such office	no such office	32D, 18R	65D, 54R, 1I	Matt W. Ransom (D)	Augustus Summerfield; Merrimon (D)	5D, 3R	Grant/ Wilson (R) ✓
1874	Curtis Hooks Brogden (R)	Curtis Hooks Brogden (R)	William H. Howerton (R)	Tazewell L. Hargrove (R)	John Reilly (R)	David A. Jenkins (R)	Alexander McIver (R)	no such office	no such office	no such office	32D, 18R	65D, 54R, 1I	Matt W. Ransom (D)	Augustus Summerfield; Merrimon (D)	5D, 3R	Grant/ Wilson (R) ✓
1875	Curtis Hooks Brogden (R)	vacant	William H. Howerton (R)	Tazewell L. Hargrove (R)	John Reilly (R)	David A. Jenkins (R)	Stephen D. Pool (C)	no such office	no such office	no such office	37D, 11R, 2I	84D, 34R, 2I	Matt W. Ransom (D)	Augustus Summerfield; Merrimon (D)	7D, 1R	Grant/ Wilson (R) ✓
1876	Curtis Hooks Brogden (R)	vacant	William H. Howerton (R)	Tazewell L. Hargrove (R)	John Reilly (R)	John M. Worth (D)	John Pool (R)	no such office	no such office	no such office	37D, 11R, 2I	84D, 34R, 2I	Matt W. Ransom (D)	Augustus Summerfield; Merrimon (D)	7D, 1R	Grant/ Wilson (R) ✓
1877	Zebulon Vance (D)	Thomas J. Jarvis (D)	Joseph A. Engelhard (D)	Thomas Kenan (D)	Samuel L. Love (D)	John M. Worth (D)	John C. Scarborough (D)	Leonidas L. Polk (D)	no such office	no such office	40D, 10R	84D, 36R	Matt W. Ransom (D)	Augustus Summerfield; Merrimon (D)	7D, 1R	Tilden/ Hendricks (D) ✗
1878	Zebulon Vance (D)	Thomas J. Jarvis (D)	Joseph A. Engelhard (D)	Thomas Kenan (D)	Samuel L. Love (D)	John M. Worth (D)	John C. Scarborough (D)	Leonidas L. Polk (D)	no such office	no such office	40D, 10R	84D, 36R	Matt W. Ransom (D)	Augustus Summerfield; Merrimon (D)	7D, 1R	Tilden/ Hendricks (D) ✗
1879	Thomas J. Jarvis (D)	Thomas J. Jarvis (D)	William L. Saunders (D)	Thomas Kenan (D)	Samuel L. Love (D)	John M. Worth (D)	John C. Scarborough (D)	Leonidas L. Polk (D)	no such office	no such office	34D, 16R	79D, 41R	Matt W. Ransom (D)	Zebulon Vance (D)	6D, 1R, 1GB	Tilden/ Hendricks (D) ✗
1880	Thomas J. Jarvis (D)	vacant	William L. Saunders (D)	Thomas Kenan (D)	Samuel L. Love (D)	John M. Worth (D)	John C. Scarborough (D)	Montford McGehee (D)	no such office	no such office	34D, 16R	79D, 41R	Matt W. Ransom (D)	Zebulon Vance (D)	7D, 1GB	Tilden/ Hendricks (D) ✗
1881	Thomas J. Jarvis (D)	James L. Robinson (D)	William L. Saunders (D)	Thomas Kenan (D)	William Paul Roberts (D)	John M. Worth (D)	John C. Scarborough (D)	Montford McGehee (D)	no such office	no such office	38D, 12R	83D, 37R	Matt W. Ransom (D)	Zebulon Vance (D)	7D, 1R	Hancock/ English (D) ✗
1882	Thomas J. Jarvis (D)	James L. Robinson (D)	William L. Saunders (D)	Thomas Kenan (D)	William Paul Roberts (D)	John M. Worth (D)	John C. Scarborough (D)	Montford McGehee (D)	no such office	no such office	38D, 12R	83D, 37R	Matt W. Ransom (D)	Zebulon Vance (D)	7D, 1R	Hancock/ English (D) ✗
1883	Thomas J. Jarvis (D)	James L. Robinson (D)	William L. Saunders (D)	Thomas Kenan (D)	William Paul Roberts (D)	John M. Worth (D)	John C. Scarborough (D)	Montford McGehee (D)	no such office	no such office	34D, 16R	68D, 52R	Matt W. Ransom (D)	Zebulon Vance (D)	7D, 2R	Hancock/ English (D) ✗
1884	Thomas J. Jarvis (D)	James L. Robinson (D)	William L. Saunders (D)	Thomas Kenan (D)	William Paul Roberts (D)	John M. Worth (D)	John C. Scarborough (D)	Montford McGehee (D)	no such office	no such office	34D, 16R	68D, 52R	Matt W. Ransom (D)	Zebulon Vance (D)	8D, 1R	Hancock/ English (D) ✗
1885	Alfred Moore Scales (D)	Charles Manly Stedman (D)	William L. Saunders (D)	Theodore F. Davidson (D)	William Paul Roberts (D)	Donald W. Bain (D)	Sidney M. Finger (D)	Montford McGehee (D)	no such office	no such office	43D, 7R	97D, 23R	Matt W. Ransom (D)	Zebulon Vance (D)	8D, 1R	Cleveland/ Hendricks (D) ✓
1886	Alfred Moore Scales (D)	Charles Manly Stedman (D)	William L. Saunders (D)	Theodore F. Davidson (D)	William Paul Roberts (D)	Donald W. Bain (D)	Sidney M. Finger (D)	Montford McGehee (D)	no such office	no such office	43D, 7R	97D, 23R	Matt W. Ransom (D)	Zebulon Vance (D)	8D, 1R	Cleveland/ Hendricks (D) ✓
1887	Alfred Moore Scales (D)	Charles Manly Stedman (D)	William L. Saunders (D)	Theodore F. Davidson (D)	William Paul Roberts (D)	Donald W. Bain (D)	Sidney M. Finger (D)	John Robinson (D)	Wesley N. Jones	no such office	33D, 17R	65D, 55R	Matt W. Ransom (D)	Zebulon Vance (D)	7D, 1R, 1I	Cleveland/ Hendricks (D) ✓
1888	Alfred Moore Scales (D)	Charles Manly Stedman (D)	William L. Saunders (D)	Theodore F. Davidson (D)	William Paul Roberts (D)	Donald W. Bain (D)	Sidney M. Finger (D)	John Robinson (D)	Wesley N. Jones	no such office	33D, 17R	65D, 55R	Matt W. Ransom (D)	Zebulon Vance (D)	7D, 1R, 1I	Cleveland/ Hendricks (D) ✓
1889	Daniel Gould Fowle (D)	Thomas Michael Holt (D)	William L. Saunders (D)	Theodore F. Davidson (D)	George W. Sanderlin	Donald W. Bain (D)	Sidney M. Finger (D)	John Robinson (D)	John C. Scarborough (D)	no such office	37D, 13R	85D, 35R	Matt W. Ransom (D)	Zebulon Vance (D)	6D, 3R	Cleveland/ Thurman (D) ✗
1890	Daniel Gould Fowle (D)	Thomas Michael Holt (D)	William L. Saunders (D)	Theodore F. Davidson (D)	George W. Sanderlin	Donald W. Bain (D)	Sidney M. Finger (D)	John Robinson (D)	John C. Scarborough (D)	no such office	37D, 13R	85D, 35R	Matt W. Ransom (D)	Zebulon Vance (D)	6D, 3R	Cleveland/ Thurman (D) ✗
1891	Thomas Michael Holt (D)	Thomas Michael Holt (D)	Octavius Coke (D)	Theodore F. Davidson (D)	George W. Sanderlin	Donald W. Bain (D)	Sidney M. Finger (D)	John Robinson (D)	John C. Scarborough (D)	no such office	43D, 7R	102D, 17R, 1I	Matt W. Ransom (D)	Zebulon Vance (D)	8D, 1R	Cleveland/ Thurman (D) ✗
1892	Thomas Michael Holt (D)	vacant	Octavius Coke (D)	Theodore F. Davidson (D)	George W. Sanderlin	Samuel McDowell Tate (D)	Sidney M. Finger (D)	John Robinson (D)	William I. Harris	no such office	43D, 7R	102D, 17R, 1I	Matt W. Ransom (D)	Zebulon Vance (D)	8D, 1R	Cleveland/ Thurman (D) ✗
1893	Elias Carr (D)	Rufus A. Doughton (D)	Octavius Coke (D)	Frank I. Osborne (D)	Robert M. Furman (D)	Samuel McDowell Tate (D)	John C. Scarborough (D)	John Robinson (D)	Benjamin R. Lacy (D)	no such office	46D, 3Pop, 1R	92D, 19R, 9Pop	Matt W. Ransom (D)	Zebulon Vance (D)	7D, 1R, 1Pop	Cleveland/ Stevenson (D) ✓
1894	Elias Carr (D)	Rufus A. Doughton (D)	Octavius Coke (D)	Frank I. Osborne (D)	Robert M. Furman (D)	Samuel McDowell Tate (D)	John C. Scarborough (D)	John Robinson (D)	Benjamin R. Lacy (D)	no such office	46D, 3Pop, 1R	92D, 19R, 9Pop	Matt W. Ransom (D)	Thomas J. Jarvis (D)	7D, 1R, 1Pop	Cleveland/ Stevenson (D) ✓
1895	Elias Carr (D)	Rufus A. Doughton (D)	Charles M. Cooke (D)	Frank I. Osborne (D)	Robert M. Furman (D)	William H. Worth (Pop)	John C. Scarborough (D)	Samuel L. Patterson (D)	Benjamin R. Lacy (D)	no such office	24Pop, 18R, 8D (Note: The Populists, in coalition with the Republicans, controlled the Senate in a pact of electoral fusion.)	46D, 38R, 36Pop (Note: The Republicans, in coalition with the Populists, controlled the House in a pact of electoral fusion.)	Marion Butler (Pop)	Jeter C. Pritchard (R)	3Pop, 3R, 3D	Cleveland/ Stevenson (D) ✓
1896	Elias Carr (D)	Rufus A. Doughton (D)	Charles M. Cooke (D)	Frank I. Osborne (D)	Robert M. Furman (D)	William H. Worth (Pop)	John C. Scarborough (D)	Samuel L. Patterson (D)	Benjamin R. Lacy (D)	no such office	24Pop, 18R, 8D	46D, 38R, 36Pop	Marion Butler (Pop)	Jeter C. Pritchard (R)	3Pop, 3R, 3D	Cleveland/ Stevenson (D) ✓
1897	Daniel Lindsay Russell (R) (Note: Russell, while a Republican, was supported by many in the Populist Party as part of an electoral fusion coalition, though a separate Populist candidate was also nominated.)	Charles A. Reynolds (R)	Cyrus Thompson (Pop)	Zeb V. Walser (R)	Hal W. Ayer (Pop)	William H. Worth (Pop)	Charles H. Mebane (Pop)	James M. Mewborne (Pop)	James Y. Hamrick (Pop)	no such office	24Pop, 17R, 9D	49R, 36D, 35Pop	Marion Butler (Pop)	Jeter C. Pritchard (R)	5Pop, 3R, 1D	6 – Bryan/ Sewall (D) ✗ 5 – Bryan/ Watson (Pop) ✗
1898	Daniel Lindsay Russell (R)	Charles A. Reynolds (R)	Cyrus Thompson (Pop)	Zeb V. Walser (R)	Hal W. Ayer (Pop)	William H. Worth (Pop)	Charles H. Mebane (Pop)	John R. Smith (R)	James Y. Hamrick (Pop)	no such office	24Pop, 17R, 9D	49R, 36D, 35Pop	Marion Butler (Pop)	Jeter C. Pritchard (R)	5Pop, 3R, 1D	6 – Bryan/ Sewall (D) ✗ 5 – Bryan/ Watson (Pop) ✗
1899	Daniel Lindsay Russell (R)	Charles A. Reynolds (R)	Cyrus Thompson (Pop)	Zeb V. Walser (R)	Hal W. Ayer (Pop)	William H. Worth (Pop)	Charles H. Mebane (Pop)	Samuel L. Patterson (D)	Benjamin R. Lacy (D)	James R. Young	40D, 10Pop (Note: The Populists ran with the Republicans on a merged ticket in a pact of electoral fusion.)	94D, 26Pop	Marion Butler (Pop)	Jeter C. Pritchard (R)	6D, 2R, 1Pop	6 – Bryan/ Sewall (D) ✗ 5 – Bryan/ Watson (Pop) ✗
1900	Daniel Lindsay Russell (R)	Charles A. Reynolds (R)	Cyrus Thompson (Pop)	Robert Dick Douglas (R)	Hal W. Ayer (Pop)	William H. Worth (Pop)	Charles H. Mebane (Pop)	Samuel L. Patterson (D)	Benjamin R. Lacy (D)	James R. Young	40D, 10Pop	94D, 26Pop	Marion Butler (Pop)	Jeter C. Pritchard (R)	6D, 2R, 1Pop	6 – Bryan/ Sewall (D) ✗ 5 – Bryan/ Watson (Pop) ✗
1901	Charles Brantley Aycock (D)	Wilfred D. Turner (D)	John Bryan Grimes (D)	Robert D. Gilmer (D)	Benjamin F. Dixon	Benjamin R. Lacy (D)	Thomas F. Toon (D)	Samuel L. Patterson (D)	Henry B. Varner (D)	James R. Young	39D, 8R, 3Pop	101D, 17R, 2Pop	F. M. Simmons (D)	Jeter C. Pritchard (R)	2R, 7D	Bryan/ Stevenson (D) ✗
1902	Charles Brantley Aycock (D)	Wilfred D. Turner (D)	John Bryan Grimes (D)	Robert D. Gilmer (D)	Benjamin F. Dixon	Benjamin R. Lacy (D)	James Y. Joyner (D)	Samuel L. Patterson (D)	Henry B. Varner (D)	James R. Young	39D, 8R, 3Pop	101D, 17R, 2Pop	F. M. Simmons (D)	Jeter C. Pritchard (R)	2R, 7D	Bryan/ Stevenson (D) ✗
1903	Charles Brantley Aycock (D)	Wilfred D. Turner (D)	John Bryan Grimes (D)	Robert D. Gilmer (D)	Benjamin F. Dixon	Benjamin R. Lacy (D)	James Y. Joyner (D)	Samuel L. Patterson (D)	Henry B. Varner (D)	James R. Young	45D, 5R	100D, 17R, 3ID	F. M. Simmons (D)	Lee S. Overman (D)	10D	Bryan/ Stevenson (D) ✗
1904	Charles Brantley Aycock (D)	Wilfred D. Turner (D)	John Bryan Grimes (D)	Robert D. Gilmer (D)	Benjamin F. Dixon	Benjamin R. Lacy (D)	James Y. Joyner (D)	Samuel L. Patterson (D)	Henry B. Varner (D)	James R. Young	45D, 5R	100D, 17R, 3ID	F. M. Simmons (D)	Lee S. Overman (D)	10D	Bryan/ Stevenson (D) ✗
1905	Robert Broadnax Glenn (D)	Francis D. Winston (D)	John Bryan Grimes (D)	Robert D. Gilmer (D)	Benjamin F. Dixon	Benjamin R. Lacy (D)	James Y. Joyner (D)	Samuel L. Patterson (D)	Henry B. Varner (D)	James R. Young	44D, 6R	104D, 16R	F. M. Simmons (D)	Lee S. Overman (D)	1R, 9D	Parker/ Davis (D) ✗
1906	Robert Broadnax Glenn (D)	Francis D. Winston (D)	John Bryan Grimes (D)	Robert D. Gilmer (D)	Benjamin F. Dixon	Benjamin R. Lacy (D)	James Y. Joyner (D)	Samuel L. Patterson (D)	Henry B. Varner (D)	James R. Young	44D, 6R	104D, 16R	F. M. Simmons (D)	Lee S. Overman (D)	1R, 9D	Parker/ Davis (D) ✗
1907	Robert Broadnax Glenn (D)	Francis D. Winston (D)	John Bryan Grimes (D)	Robert D. Gilmer (D)	Benjamin F. Dixon	Benjamin R. Lacy (D)	James Y. Joyner (D)	Samuel L. Patterson (D)	Henry B. Varner (D)	James R. Young	46D, 4R	99D, 21R	F. M. Simmons (D)	Lee S. Overman (D)	10D	Parker/ Davis (D) ✗
1908	Robert Broadnax Glenn (D)	Francis D. Winston (D)	John Bryan Grimes (D)	Robert D. Gilmer (D)	Benjamin F. Dixon	Benjamin R. Lacy (D)	James Y. Joyner (D)	William A. Graham (D)	Henry B. Varner (D)	James R. Young	46D, 4R	99D, 21R	F. M. Simmons (D)	Lee S. Overman (D)	10D	Parker/ Davis (D) ✗
1909	William Walton Kitchin (D)	William C. Newland (D)	John Bryan Grimes (D)	Thomas Walter Bickett (D)	Benjamin F. Dixon	Benjamin R. Lacy (D)	James Y. Joyner (D)	William A. Graham (D)	Mitchell L. Shipman (D)	James R. Young	40D, 10R	96D, 24R	F. M. Simmons (D)	Lee S. Overman (D)	3R, 7D	Bryan/ Kern (D) ✗
1910	William Walton Kitchin (D)	William C. Newland (D)	John Bryan Grimes (D)	Thomas Walter Bickett (D)	Benjamin F. Dixon Jr.	Benjamin R. Lacy (D)	James Y. Joyner (D)	William A. Graham (D)	Mitchell L. Shipman (D)	James R. Young	40D, 10R	96D, 24R	F. M. Simmons (D)	Lee S. Overman (D)	3R, 7D	Bryan/ Kern (D) ✗
1911	William Walton Kitchin (D)	William C. Newland (D)	John Bryan Grimes (D)	Thomas Walter Bickett (D)	William P. Wood (D)	Benjamin R. Lacy (D)	James Y. Joyner (D)	William A. Graham (D)	Mitchell L. Shipman (D)	James R. Young	43D, 7R	99D, 21R	F. M. Simmons (D)	Lee S. Overman (D)	10D	Bryan/ Kern (D) ✗
1912	William Walton Kitchin (D)	William C. Newland (D)	John Bryan Grimes (D)	Thomas Walter Bickett (D)	William P. Wood (D)	Benjamin R. Lacy (D)	James Y. Joyner (D)	William A. Graham (D)	Mitchell L. Shipman (D)	James R. Young	43D, 7R	99D, 21R	F. M. Simmons (D)	Lee S. Overman (D)	10D	Bryan/ Kern (D) ✗
1913	Locke Craig (D)	Elijah L. Daughtridge (D)	John Bryan Grimes (D)	Thomas Walter Bickett (D)	William P. Wood (D)	Benjamin R. Lacy (D)	James Y. Joyner (D)	William A. Graham (D)	Mitchell L. Shipman (D)	James R. Young	47D, 3R	107D, 13R	F. M. Simmons (D)	Lee S. Overman (D)	10D	Wilson/ Marshall (D) ✓
1914	Locke Craig (D)	Elijah L. Daughtridge (D)	John Bryan Grimes (D)	Thomas Walter Bickett (D)	William P. Wood (D)	Benjamin R. Lacy (D)	James Y. Joyner (D)	William A. Graham (D)	Mitchell L. Shipman (D)	James R. Young	47D, 3R	107D, 13R	F. M. Simmons (D)	Lee S. Overman (D)	10D	Wilson/ Marshall (D) ✓
1915	Locke Craig (D)	Elijah L. Daughtridge (D)	John Bryan Grimes (D)	Thomas Walter Bickett (D)	William P. Wood (D)	Benjamin R. Lacy (D)	James Y. Joyner (D)	William A. Graham (D)	Mitchell L. Shipman (D)	James R. Young	43D, 7R	98D, 20R, 2I	F. M. Simmons (D)	Lee S. Overman (D)	1R, 9D	Wilson/ Marshall (D) ✓
1916	Locke Craig (D)	Elijah L. Daughtridge (D)	John Bryan Grimes (D)	Thomas Walter Bickett (D)	William P. Wood (D)	Benjamin R. Lacy (D)	James Y. Joyner (D)	William A. Graham (D)	Mitchell L. Shipman (D)	James R. Young	43D, 7R	98D, 20R, 2I	F. M. Simmons (D)	Lee S. Overman (D)	1R, 9D	Wilson/ Marshall (D) ✓
1917	Thomas Walter Bickett (D)	Oliver Max Gardner (D)	John Bryan Grimes (D)	James S. Manning (D)	William P. Wood (D)	Benjamin R. Lacy (D)	James Y. Joyner (D)	William A. Graham (D)	Mitchell L. Shipman (D)	James R. Young	41D, 9R	97D, 22R, 1I	F. M. Simmons (D)	Lee S. Overman (D)	10D	Wilson/ Marshall (D) ✓
1918	Thomas Walter Bickett (D)	Oliver Max Gardner (D)	John Bryan Grimes (D)	James S. Manning (D)	William P. Wood (D)	Benjamin R. Lacy (D)	James Y. Joyner (D)	William A. Graham (D)	Mitchell L. Shipman (D)	James R. Young	41D, 9R	97D, 22R, 1I	F. M. Simmons (D)	Lee S. Overman (D)	10D	Wilson/ Marshall (D) ✓
1919	Thomas Walter Bickett (D)	Oliver Max Gardner (D)	John Bryan Grimes (D)	James S. Manning (D)	William P. Wood (D)	Benjamin R. Lacy (D)	Eugene C. Brooks (D)	William A. Graham (D)	Mitchell L. Shipman (D)	James R. Young	40D, 10R	93D, 27R	F. M. Simmons (D)	Lee S. Overman (D)	10D	Wilson/ Marshall (D) ✓
1920	Thomas Walter Bickett (D)	Oliver Max Gardner (D)	John Bryan Grimes (D)	James S. Manning (D)	William P. Wood (D)	Benjamin R. Lacy (D)	Eugene C. Brooks (D)	William A. Graham (D)	Mitchell L. Shipman (D)	James R. Young	40D, 10R	93D, 27R	F. M. Simmons (D)	Lee S. Overman (D)	10D	Wilson/ Marshall (D) ✓
1921	Cameron A. Morrison (D)	William B. Cooper (D)	John Bryan Grimes (D)	James S. Manning (D)	Baxter Durham (D)	Benjamin R. Lacy (D)	Eugene C. Brooks (D)	William A. Graham (D)	Mitchell L. Shipman (D)	Stacey W. Wade (D)	39D, 11R	91D, 29R	F. M. Simmons (D)	Lee S. Overman (D)	10D	Cox/ Roosevelt (D) ✗
1922	Cameron A. Morrison (D)	William B. Cooper (D)	John Bryan Grimes (D)	James S. Manning (D)	Baxter Durham (D)	Benjamin R. Lacy (D)	Eugene C. Brooks (D)	William A. Graham (D)	Mitchell L. Shipman (D)	Stacey W. Wade (D)	39D, 11R	91D, 29R	F. M. Simmons (D)	Lee S. Overman (D)	10D	Cox/ Roosevelt (D) ✗
1923	Cameron A. Morrison (D)	William B. Cooper (D)	William N. Everett (D)	James S. Manning (D)	Baxter Durham (D)	Benjamin R. Lacy (D)	Arch T. Allen (D)	William A. Graham Jr. (D)	Mitchell L. Shipman (D)	Stacey W. Wade (D)	47D, 3R	110D, 10R	F. M. Simmons (D)	Lee S. Overman (D)	10D	Cox/ Roosevelt (D) ✗
1924	Cameron A. Morrison (D)	William B. Cooper (D)	William N. Everett (D)	James S. Manning (D)	Baxter Durham (D)	Benjamin R. Lacy (D)	Arch T. Allen (D)	William A. Graham Jr. (D)	Mitchell L. Shipman (D)	Stacey W. Wade (D)	47D, 3R	110D, 10R	F. M. Simmons (D)	Lee S. Overman (D)	10D	Cox/ Roosevelt (D) ✗
1925	Angus Wilton McLean (D)	J. Elmer Long (D)	William N. Everett (D)	Dennis G. Brummitt (D)	Baxter Durham (D)	Benjamin R. Lacy (D)	Arch T. Allen (D)	William A. Graham Jr. (D)	Franklin D. Grist (D)	Stacey W. Wade (D)	47D, 3R	102D, 18R	F. M. Simmons (D)	Lee S. Overman (D)	10D	Davis/ Bryan (D) ✗
1926	Angus Wilton McLean (D)	J. Elmer Long (D)	William N. Everett (D)	Dennis G. Brummitt (D)	Baxter Durham (D)	Benjamin R. Lacy (D)	Arch T. Allen (D)	William A. Graham Jr. (D)	Franklin D. Grist (D)	Stacey W. Wade (D)	47D, 3R	102D, 18R	F. M. Simmons (D)	Lee S. Overman (D)	10D	Davis/ Bryan (D) ✗
1927	Angus Wilton McLean (D)	J. Elmer Long (D)	William N. Everett (D)	Dennis G. Brummitt (D)	Baxter Durham (D)	Benjamin R. Lacy (D)	Arch T. Allen (D)	William A. Graham Jr. (D)	Franklin D. Grist (D)	Daniel C. Boney (D)	47D, 3R	104D, 16R	F. M. Simmons (D)	Lee S. Overman (D)	10D	Davis/ Bryan (D) ✗
1928	Angus Wilton McLean (D)	J. Elmer Long (D)	James A. Hartness (D)	Dennis G. Brummitt (D)	Baxter Durham (D)	Benjamin R. Lacy (D)	Arch T. Allen (D)	William A. Graham Jr. (D)	Franklin D. Grist (D)	Daniel C. Boney (D)	47D, 3R	104D, 16R	F. M. Simmons (D)	Lee S. Overman (D)	10D	Davis/ Bryan (D) ✗
1929	Oliver Max Gardner (D)	Richard T. Fountain (D)	James A. Hartness (D)	Dennis G. Brummitt (D)	Baxter Durham (D)	Nathan O'Berry (D)	Arch T. Allen (D)	William A. Graham Jr. (D)	Franklin D. Grist (D)	Daniel C. Boney (D)	38D, 12R	84D, 36R	F. M. Simmons (D)	Lee S. Overman (D)	8D, 2R	Hoover/ Curtis (R) ✓
1930	Oliver Max Gardner (D)	Richard T. Fountain (D)	James A. Hartness (D)	Dennis G. Brummitt (D)	Baxter Durham (D)	Nathan O'Berry (D)	Arch T. Allen (D)	William A. Graham Jr. (D)	Franklin D. Grist (D)	Daniel C. Boney (D)	38D, 12R	84D, 36R	F. M. Simmons (D)	Lee S. Overman (D)	8D, 2R	Hoover/ Curtis (R) ✓
1931	Oliver Max Gardner (D)	Richard T. Fountain (D)	James A. Hartness (D)	Dennis G. Brummitt (D)	Baxter Durham (D)	Nathan O'Berry (D)	Arch T. Allen (D)	William A. Graham Jr. (D)	Franklin D. Grist (D)	Daniel C. Boney (D)	48D, 2R	115D, 5R	Josiah Bailey (D)	Cameron A. Morrison (D)	10D	Hoover/ Curtis (R) ✓
1932	Oliver Max Gardner (D)	Richard T. Fountain (D)	James A. Hartness (D)	Dennis G. Brummitt (D)	Baxter Durham (D)	John P. Stedman (D)	Arch T. Allen (D)	William A. Graham Jr. (D)	Franklin D. Grist (D)	Daniel C. Boney (D)	48D, 2R	115D, 5R	Josiah Bailey (D)	Cameron A. Morrison (D)	10D	Hoover/ Curtis (R) ✓
1933	John C. B. Ehringhaus (D)	Alexander H. Graham (D)	Stacey W. Wade (D)	Dennis G. Brummitt (D)	Baxter Durham (D)	Charles M. Johnson (D)	Arch T. Allen (D)	William A. Graham Jr. (D)	Arthur L. Fletcher (D)	Daniel C. Boney (D)	48D, 2R	112D, 8R	Josiah Bailey (D)	Robert R. Reynolds (D)	11D	Roosevelt/ Garner (D) ✓
1934	John C. B. Ehringhaus (D)	Alexander H. Graham (D)	Stacey W. Wade (D)	Dennis G. Brummitt (D)	Baxter Durham (D)	Charles M. Johnson (D)	Clyde A. Erwin (D)	William A. Graham Jr. (D)	Arthur L. Fletcher (D)	Daniel C. Boney (D)	48D, 2R	112D, 8R	Josiah Bailey (D)	Robert R. Reynolds (D)	11D	Roosevelt/ Garner (D) ✓
1935	John C. B. Ehringhaus (D)	Alexander H. Graham (D)	Stacey W. Wade (D)	Aaron A. F. Seawell (D)	Baxter Durham (D)	Charles M. Johnson (D)	Clyde A. Erwin (D)	William A. Graham Jr. (D)	Arthur L. Fletcher (D)	Daniel C. Boney (D)	48D, 2R	108D, 12R	Josiah Bailey (D)	Robert R. Reynolds (D)	11D	Roosevelt/ Garner (D) ✓
1936	John C. B. Ehringhaus (D)	Alexander H. Graham (D)	Charles G. Powell (D)	Aaron A. F. Seawell (D)	Baxter Durham (D)	Charles M. Johnson (D)	Clyde A. Erwin (D)	William A. Graham Jr. (D)	Arthur L. Fletcher (D)	Daniel C. Boney (D)	48D, 2R	108D, 12R	Josiah Bailey (D)	Robert R. Reynolds (D)	11D	Roosevelt/ Garner (D) ✓
1937	Clyde R. Hoey (D)	Wilkins P. Horton (D)	Thad A. Eure (D)	Aaron A. F. Seawell (D)	George Ross Pou (D)	Charles M. Johnson (D)	Clyde A. Erwin (D)	W. Kerr Scott (D)	Arthur L. Fletcher (D)	Daniel C. Boney (D)	48D, 2R	112D, 8R	Josiah Bailey (D)	Robert R. Reynolds (D)	11D	Roosevelt/ Garner (D) ✓
1938	Clyde R. Hoey (D)	Wilkins P. Horton (D)	Thad A. Eure (D)	Harry McMullan (D)	George Ross Pou (D)	Charles M. Johnson (D)	Clyde A. Erwin (D)	W. Kerr Scott (D)	Forrest H. Shuford (D)	Daniel C. Boney (D)	48D, 2R	112D, 8R	Josiah Bailey (D)	Robert R. Reynolds (D)	11D	Roosevelt/ Garner (D) ✓
1939	Clyde R. Hoey (D)	Wilkins P. Horton (D)	Thad A. Eure (D)	Harry McMullan (D)	George Ross Pou (D)	Charles M. Johnson (D)	Clyde A. Erwin (D)	W. Kerr Scott (D)	Forrest H. Shuford (D)	Daniel C. Boney (D)	48D, 2R	114D, 6R	Josiah Bailey (D)	Robert R. Reynolds (D)	11D	Roosevelt/ Garner (D) ✓
1940	Clyde R. Hoey (D)	Wilkins P. Horton (D)	Thad A. Eure (D)	Harry McMullan (D)	George Ross Pou (D)	Charles M. Johnson (D)	Clyde A. Erwin (D)	W. Kerr Scott (D)	Forrest H. Shuford (D)	Daniel C. Boney (D)	48D, 2R	114D, 6R	Josiah Bailey (D)	Robert R. Reynolds (D)	11D	Roosevelt/ Garner (D) ✓
1941	J. Melville Broughton (D)	Reginald L. Harris (D)	Thad A. Eure (D)	Harry McMullan (D)	George Ross Pou (D)	Charles M. Johnson (D)	Clyde A. Erwin (D)	W. Kerr Scott (D)	Forrest H. Shuford (D)	Daniel C. Boney (D)	48D, 2R	114D, 6R	Josiah Bailey (D)	Robert R. Reynolds (D)	11D	Roosevelt/ Wallace (D) ✓
1942	J. Melville Broughton (D)	Reginald L. Harris (D)	Thad A. Eure (D)	Harry McMullan (D)	George Ross Pou (D)	Charles M. Johnson (D)	Clyde A. Erwin (D)	W. Kerr Scott (D)	Forrest H. Shuford (D)	William P. Hodges (D)	48D, 2R	114D, 6R	Josiah Bailey (D)	Robert R. Reynolds (D)	11D	Roosevelt/ Wallace (D) ✓
1943	J. Melville Broughton (D)	Reginald L. Harris (D)	Thad A. Eure (D)	Harry McMullan (D)	George Ross Pou (D)	Charles M. Johnson (D)	Clyde A. Erwin (D)	W. Kerr Scott (D)	Forrest H. Shuford (D)	William P. Hodges (D)	48D, 2R	108D, 12R	Josiah Bailey (D)	Robert R. Reynolds (D)	12D	Roosevelt/ Wallace (D) ✓
1944	J. Melville Broughton (D)	Reginald L. Harris (D)	Thad A. Eure (D)	Harry McMullan (D)	George Ross Pou (D)	Charles M. Johnson (D)	Clyde A. Erwin (D)	W. Kerr Scott (D)	Forrest H. Shuford (D)	William P. Hodges (D)	48D, 2R	108D, 12R	Josiah Bailey (D)	Robert R. Reynolds (D)	12D	Roosevelt/ Wallace (D) ✓
1945	R. Gregg Cherry (D)	Lynton Y. Ballentine (D)	Thad A. Eure (D)	Harry McMullan (D)	George Ross Pou (D)	Charles M. Johnson (D)	Clyde A. Erwin (D)	W. Kerr Scott (D)	Forrest H. Shuford (D)	William P. Hodges (D)	47D, 3R	106D, 14R	Josiah Bailey (D)	Clyde R. Hoey (D)	12D	Roosevelt/ Truman (D) ✓
1946	R. Gregg Cherry (D)	Lynton Y. Ballentine (D)	Thad A. Eure (D)	Harry McMullan (D)	George Ross Pou (D)	Charles M. Johnson (D)	Clyde A. Erwin (D)	W. Kerr Scott (D)	Forrest H. Shuford (D)	William P. Hodges (D)	47D, 3R	106D, 14R	Josiah Bailey (D)	Clyde R. Hoey (D)	12D	Roosevelt/ Truman (D) ✓
1947	R. Gregg Cherry (D)	Lynton Y. Ballentine (D)	Thad A. Eure (D)	Harry McMullan (D)	Henry L. Bridges (D)	Charles M. Johnson (D)	Clyde A. Erwin (D)	W. Kerr Scott (D)	Forrest H. Shuford (D)	William P. Hodges (D)	48D, 2R	108D, 12R	William B. Umstead (D)	Clyde R. Hoey (D)	12D	Roosevelt/ Truman (D) ✓
1948	R. Gregg Cherry (D)	Lynton Y. Ballentine (D)	Thad A. Eure (D)	Harry McMullan (D)	Henry L. Bridges (D)	Charles M. Johnson (D)	Clyde A. Erwin (D)	David S. Coltrane (D)	Forrest H. Shuford (D)	William P. Hodges (D)	48D, 2R	108D, 12R	William B. Umstead (D)	Clyde R. Hoey (D)	12D	Roosevelt/ Truman (D) ✓
1949	W. Kerr Scott (D)	Hoyt Patrick Taylor(D)	Thad A. Eure (D)	Harry McMullan (D)	Henry L. Bridges (D)	Brandon P. Hodges (D)	Clyde A. Erwin (D)	Lynton Y. Ballentine (D)	Forrest H. Shuford (D)	Waldo C. Cheek (D)	48D, 2R	109D, 11R	J. Melville Broughton (D)	Clyde R. Hoey (D)	12D	Truman/ Barkley (D) ✓
1950	W. Kerr Scott (D)	Hoyt Patrick Taylor(D)	Thad A. Eure (D)	Harry McMullan (D)	Henry L. Bridges (D)	Brandon P. Hodges (D)	Clyde A. Erwin (D)	Lynton Y. Ballentine (D)	Forrest H. Shuford (D)	Waldo C. Cheek (D)	48D, 2R	109D, 11R	Frank Porter Graham (D)	Clyde R. Hoey (D)	12D	Truman/ Barkley (D) ✓
1951	W. Kerr Scott (D)	Hoyt Patrick Taylor(D)	Thad A. Eure (D)	Harry McMullan (D)	Henry L. Bridges (D)	Brandon P. Hodges (D)	Clyde A. Erwin (D)	Lynton Y. Ballentine (D)	Forrest H. Shuford (D)	Waldo C. Cheek (D)	48D, 2R	111D, 9R	Willis Smith (D)	Clyde R. Hoey (D)	12D	Truman/ Barkley (D) ✓
1952	W. Kerr Scott (D)	Hoyt Patrick Taylor(D)	Thad A. Eure (D)	Harry McMullan (D)	Henry L. Bridges (D)	Brandon P. Hodges (D)	Charles F. Carroll (D)	Lynton Y. Ballentine (D)	Forrest H. Shuford (D)	Waldo C. Cheek (D)	48D, 2R	111D, 9R	Willis Smith (D)	Clyde R. Hoey (D)	12D	Truman/ Barkley (D) ✓
1953	William B. Umstead (D)	Luther H. Hodges (D)	Thad A. Eure (D)	Harry McMullan (D)	Henry L. Bridges (D)	Edwin M. Gill (D)	Charles F. Carroll (D)	Lynton Y. Ballentine (D)	Forrest H. Shuford (D)	Charles F. Gold (D)	48D, 2R	106D, 14R	Alton Lennon (D)	Clyde R. Hoey (D)	11D, 1R	Stevenson/ Sparkman (D) ✗
1954	Luther H. Hodges (D)	vacant	Thad A. Eure (D)	Harry McMullan (D)	Henry L. Bridges (D)	Edwin M. Gill (D)	Charles F. Carroll (D)	Lynton Y. Ballentine (D)	Frank Crane (D)	Charles F. Gold (D)	48D, 2R	106D, 14R	Alton Lennon (D)	Sam Ervin (D) (Note: Initially appointed to fill vacancy; later elected in his own right.)	11D, 1R	Stevenson/ Sparkman (D) ✗
1955	Luther H. Hodges (D)	vacant	Thad A. Eure (D)	William B. Rodman Jr. (D)	Henry L. Bridges (D)	Edwin M. Gill (D)	Charles F. Carroll (D)	Lynton Y. Ballentine (D)	Frank Crane (D)	Charles F. Gold (D)	49D, 1R	110D, 10R	W. Kerr Scott (D)	Sam Ervin (D)	11D, 1R	Stevenson/ Sparkman (D) ✗
1956	Luther H. Hodges (D)	vacant	Thad A. Eure (D)	George B. Patton (D)	Henry L. Bridges (D)	Edwin M. Gill (D)	Charles F. Carroll (D)	Lynton Y. Ballentine (D)	Frank Crane (D)	Charles F. Gold (D)	49D, 1R	110D, 10R	W. Kerr Scott (D)	Sam Ervin (D)	11D, 1R	Stevenson/ Sparkman (D) ✗
1957	Luther H. Hodges (D)	Luther E. Barnhardt (D)	Thad A. Eure (D)	George B. Patton (D)	Henry L. Bridges (D)	Edwin M. Gill (D)	Charles F. Carroll (D)	Lynton Y. Ballentine (D)	Frank Crane (D)	Charles F. Gold (D)	47D, 3R	107D, 13R	W. Kerr Scott (D)	Sam Ervin (D)	11D, 1R	Stevenson/ Kefauver (D) ✗
1958	Luther H. Hodges (D)	Luther E. Barnhardt (D)	Thad A. Eure (D)	Malcolm Buie Seawell (D)	Henry L. Bridges (D)	Edwin M. Gill (D)	Charles F. Carroll (D)	Lynton Y. Ballentine (D)	Frank Crane (D)	Charles F. Gold (D)	47D, 3R	107D, 13R	B. Everett Jordan (D)	Sam Ervin (D)	11D, 1R	Stevenson/ Kefauver (D) ✗
1959	Luther H. Hodges (D)	Luther E. Barnhardt (D)	Thad A. Eure (D)	Malcolm Buie Seawell (D)	Henry L. Bridges (D)	Edwin M. Gill (D)	Charles F. Carroll (D)	Lynton Y. Ballentine (D)	Frank Crane (D)	Charles F. Gold (D)	49D, 1R	116D, 4R	B. Everett Jordan (D)	Sam Ervin (D)	11D, 1R	Stevenson/ Kefauver (D) ✗
1960	Luther H. Hodges (D)	Luther E. Barnhardt (D)	Thad A. Eure (D)	T. Wade Bruton (D)	Henry L. Bridges (D)	Edwin M. Gill (D)	Charles F. Carroll (D)	Lynton Y. Ballentine (D)	Frank Crane (D)	Charles F. Gold (D)	49D, 1R	116D, 4R	B. Everett Jordan (D)	Sam Ervin (D)	11D, 1R	Stevenson/ Kefauver (D) ✗
1961	Terry Sanford (D)	Harvey Cloyd Philpott (D)	Thad A. Eure (D)	T. Wade Bruton (D)	Henry L. Bridges (D)	Edwin M. Gill (D)	Charles F. Carroll (D)	Lynton Y. Ballentine (D)	Frank Crane (D)	Charles F. Gold (D)	48D, 2R	105D, 15R	B. Everett Jordan (D)	Sam Ervin (D)	11D, 1R	Kennedy/ Johnson (D) ✓
1962	Terry Sanford (D)	vacant	Thad A. Eure (D)	T. Wade Bruton (D)	Henry L. Bridges (D)	Edwin M. Gill (D)	Charles F. Carroll (D)	Lynton Y. Ballentine (D)	Frank Crane (D)	Edwin S. Lanier (D)	48D, 2R	105D, 15R	B. Everett Jordan (D)	Sam Ervin (D)	11D, 1R	Kennedy/ Johnson (D) ✓
1963	Terry Sanford (D)	vacant	Thad A. Eure (D)	T. Wade Bruton (D)	Henry L. Bridges (D)	Edwin M. Gill (D)	Charles F. Carroll (D)	Lynton Y. Ballentine (D)	Frank Crane (D)	Edwin S. Lanier (D)	48D, 2R	99D, 21R	B. Everett Jordan (D)	Sam Ervin (D)	9D, 2R	Kennedy/ Johnson (D) ✓
1964	Terry Sanford (D)	vacant	Thad A. Eure (D)	T. Wade Bruton (D)	Henry L. Bridges (D)	Edwin M. Gill (D)	Charles F. Carroll (D)	James Allen Graham (D)	Frank Crane (D)	Edwin S. Lanier (D)	48D, 2R	99D, 21R	B. Everett Jordan (D)	Sam Ervin (D)	9D, 2R	Kennedy/ Johnson (D) ✓
1965	Dan K. Moore (D)	Robert W. Scott (D)	Thad A. Eure (D)	T. Wade Bruton (D)	Henry L. Bridges (D)	Edwin M. Gill (D)	Charles F. Carroll (D)	James Allen Graham (D)	Frank Crane (D)	Edwin S. Lanier (D)	49D, 1R	106D, 14R	B. Everett Jordan (D)	Sam Ervin (D)	9D, 2R	Johnson/ Humphrey (D) ✓
1966	Dan K. Moore (D)	Robert W. Scott (D)	Thad A. Eure (D)	T. Wade Bruton (D)	Henry L. Bridges (D)	Edwin M. Gill (D)	Charles F. Carroll (D)	James Allen Graham (D)	Frank Crane (D)	Edwin S. Lanier (D)	49D, 1R	106D, 14R	B. Everett Jordan (D)	Sam Ervin (D)	9D, 2R	Johnson/ Humphrey (D) ✓
1967	Dan K. Moore (D)	Robert W. Scott (D)	Thad A. Eure (D)	T. Wade Bruton (D)	Henry L. Bridges (D)	Edwin M. Gill (D)	Charles F. Carroll (D)	James Allen Graham (D)	Frank Crane (D)	Edwin S. Lanier (D)	43D, 7R	94D, 26R	B. Everett Jordan (D)	Sam Ervin (D)	8D, 3R	Johnson/ Humphrey (D) ✓
1968	Dan K. Moore (D)	Robert W. Scott (D)	Thad A. Eure (D)	T. Wade Bruton (D)	Henry L. Bridges (D)	Edwin M. Gill (D)	Charles F. Carroll (D)	James Allen Graham (D)	Frank Crane (D)	Edwin S. Lanier (D)	43D, 7R	94D, 26R	B. Everett Jordan (D)	Sam Ervin (D)	8D, 3R	Johnson/ Humphrey (D) ✓
1969	Robert W. Scott (D)	Hoyt Patrick Taylor Jr. (D)	Thad A. Eure (D)	Robert B. Morgan (D)	Henry L. Bridges (D)	Edwin M. Gill (D)	A. Craig Phillips (D)	James Allen Graham (D)	Frank Crane (D)	Edwin S. Lanier (D)	38D, 12R	91D, 29R	B. Everett Jordan (D)	Sam Ervin (D)	7D, 4R	Nixon/ Agnew (R) ✓
1970	Robert W. Scott (D)	Hoyt Patrick Taylor Jr. (D)	Thad A. Eure (D)	Robert B. Morgan (D)	Henry L. Bridges (D)	Edwin M. Gill (D)	A. Craig Phillips (D)	James Allen Graham (D)	Frank Crane (D)	Edwin S. Lanier (D)	38D, 12R	91D, 29R	B. Everett Jordan (D)	Sam Ervin (D)	7D, 4R	Nixon/ Agnew (R) ✓
1971	Robert W. Scott (D)	Hoyt Patrick Taylor Jr. (D)	Thad A. Eure (D)	Robert B. Morgan (D)	Henry L. Bridges (D)	Edwin M. Gill (D)	A. Craig Phillips (D)	James Allen Graham (D)	Frank Crane (D)	Edwin S. Lanier (D)	43D, 7R	96D, 24R	B. Everett Jordan (D)	Sam Ervin (D)	7D, 4R	Nixon/ Agnew (R) ✓
1972	Robert W. Scott (D)	Hoyt Patrick Taylor Jr. (D)	Thad A. Eure (D)	Robert B. Morgan (D)	Henry L. Bridges (D)	Edwin M. Gill (D)	A. Craig Phillips (D)	James Allen Graham (D)	Frank Crane (D)	Edwin S. Lanier (D)	43D, 7R	96D, 24R	B. Everett Jordan (D)	Sam Ervin (D)	7D, 4R	Nixon/ Agnew (R) ✓
1973	James Holshouser (R)	Jim Hunt (D)	Thad A. Eure (D)	Robert B. Morgan (D)	Henry L. Bridges (D)	Edwin M. Gill (D)	A. Craig Phillips (D)	James Allen Graham (D)	William C. Creel (D)	John Ingram (D)	34D, 16R	85D, 35R	Jesse Helms (R)	Sam Ervin (D)	7D, 4R	Nixon/ Agnew (R) ✓
1974	James Holshouser (R)	Jim Hunt (D)	Thad A. Eure (D)	James H. Carson Jr. (R)	Henry L. Bridges (D)	Edwin M. Gill (D)	A. Craig Phillips (D)	James Allen Graham (D)	William C. Creel (D)	John Ingram (D)	34D, 16R	85D, 35R	Jesse Helms (R)	Sam Ervin (D)	7D, 4R	Nixon/ Agnew (R) ✓
1975	James Holshouser (R)	Jim Hunt (D)	Thad A. Eure (D)	James H. Carson Jr. (R)	Henry L. Bridges (D)	Edwin M. Gill (D)	A. Craig Phillips (D)	James Allen Graham (D)	Thomas Avery Nye Jr. (R)	John Ingram (D)	49D, 1R	111D, 9R	Jesse Helms (R)	Robert B. Morgan (D)	9D, 2R	Nixon/ Agnew (R) ✓
1976	James Holshouser (R)	Jim Hunt (D)	Thad A. Eure (D)	Rufus Edmisten (D)	Henry L. Bridges (D)	Edwin M. Gill (D)	A. Craig Phillips (D)	James Allen Graham (D)	Thomas Avery Nye Jr. (R)	John Ingram (D)	49D, 1R	111D, 9R	Jesse Helms (R)	Robert B. Morgan (D)	9D, 2R	Nixon/ Agnew (R) ✓
1977	Jim Hunt (D)	James C. Green (D)	Thad A. Eure (D)	Rufus Edmisten (D)	Henry L. Bridges (D)	Harlan E. Boyles (D)	A. Craig Phillips (D)	James Allen Graham (D)	John C. Brooks (D)	John Ingram (D)	46D, 4R	114D, 6R	Jesse Helms (R)	Robert B. Morgan (D)	9D, 2R	Carter/ Mondale (D) ✓
1978	Jim Hunt (D)	James C. Green (D)	Thad A. Eure (D)	Rufus Edmisten (D)	Henry L. Bridges (D)	Harlan E. Boyles (D)	A. Craig Phillips (D)	James Allen Graham (D)	John C. Brooks (D)	John Ingram (D)	46D, 4R	114D, 6R	Jesse Helms (R)	Robert B. Morgan (D)	9D, 2R	Carter/ Mondale (D) ✓
1979	Jim Hunt (D)	James C. Green (D)	Thad A. Eure (D)	Rufus Edmisten (D)	Henry L. Bridges (D)	Harlan E. Boyles (D)	A. Craig Phillips (D)	James Allen Graham (D)	John C. Brooks (D)	John Ingram (D)	45D, 5R	105D, 15R	Jesse Helms (R)	Robert B. Morgan (D)	9D, 2R	Carter/ Mondale (D) ✓
1980	Jim Hunt (D)	James C. Green (D)	Thad A. Eure (D)	Rufus Edmisten (D)	Henry L. Bridges (D)	Harlan E. Boyles (D)	A. Craig Phillips (D)	James Allen Graham (D)	John C. Brooks (D)	John Ingram (D)	45D, 5R	105D, 15R	Jesse Helms (R)	Robert B. Morgan (D)	9D, 2R	Carter/ Mondale (D) ✓
1981	Jim Hunt (D)	James C. Green (D)	Thad A. Eure (D)	Rufus Edmisten (D)	Ed Renfrow (D)	Harlan E. Boyles (D)	A. Craig Phillips (D)	James Allen Graham (D)	John C. Brooks (D)	John Ingram (D)	40D, 10R	96D, 24R	Jesse Helms (R)	John P. East (R)	7D, 4R	Reagan/ Bush (R) ✓
1982	Jim Hunt (D)	James C. Green (D)	Thad A. Eure (D)	Rufus Edmisten (D)	Ed Renfrow (D)	Harlan E. Boyles (D)	A. Craig Phillips (D)	James Allen Graham (D)	John C. Brooks (D)	John Ingram (D)	40D, 10R	96D, 24R	Jesse Helms (R)	John P. East (R)	7D, 4R	Reagan/ Bush (R) ✓
1983	Jim Hunt (D)	James C. Green (D)	Thad A. Eure (D)	Rufus Edmisten (D)	Ed Renfrow (D)	Harlan E. Boyles (D)	A. Craig Phillips (D)	James Allen Graham (D)	John C. Brooks (D)	John Ingram (D)	44D, 6R	102D, 18R	Jesse Helms (R)	John P. East (R)	9D, 2R	Reagan/ Bush (R) ✓
1984	Jim Hunt (D)	James C. Green (D)	Thad A. Eure (D)	Rufus Edmisten (D)	Ed Renfrow (D)	Harlan E. Boyles (D)	A. Craig Phillips (D)	James Allen Graham (D)	John C. Brooks (D)	John Ingram (D)	44D, 6R	102D, 18R	Jesse Helms (R)	John P. East (R)	9D, 2R	Reagan/ Bush (R) ✓
1985	James G. Martin (R)	Robert B. Jordan (D)	Thad A. Eure (D)	Lacy Thornburg (D)	Ed Renfrow (D)	Harlan E. Boyles (D)	A. Craig Phillips (D)	James Allen Graham (D)	John C. Brooks (D)	James E. Long (D)	38D, 12R	82D, 38R	Jesse Helms (R)	John P. East (R)	6D, 5R	Reagan/ Bush (R) ✓
1986	James G. Martin (R)	Robert B. Jordan (D)	Thad A. Eure (D)	Lacy Thornburg (D)	Ed Renfrow (D)	Harlan E. Boyles (D)	A. Craig Phillips (D)	James Allen Graham (D)	John C. Brooks (D)	James E. Long (D)	38D, 12R	82D, 38R	Jesse Helms (R)	Jim Broyhill (R)	6D, 5R	Reagan/ Bush (R) ✓
1987	James G. Martin (R)	Robert B. Jordan (D)	Thad A. Eure (D)	Lacy Thornburg (D)	Ed Renfrow (D)	Harlan E. Boyles (D)	A. Craig Phillips (D)	James Allen Graham (D)	John C. Brooks (D)	James E. Long (D)	40D, 10R	81D, 39R	Jesse Helms (R)	Terry Sanford (D)	8D, 3R	Reagan/ Bush (R) ✓
1988	James G. Martin (R)	Robert B. Jordan (D)	Thad A. Eure (D)	Lacy Thornburg (D)	Ed Renfrow (D)	Harlan E. Boyles (D)	A. Craig Phillips (D)	James Allen Graham (D)	John C. Brooks (D)	James E. Long (D)	40D, 10R	81D, 39R	Jesse Helms (R)	Terry Sanford (D)	8D, 3R	Reagan/ Bush (R) ✓
1989	James G. Martin (R)	Jim Gardner (R)	Rufus Edmisten (D)	Lacy Thornburg (D)	Ed Renfrow (D)	Harlan E. Boyles (D)	Bob Etheridge (D)	James Allen Graham (D)	John C. Brooks (D)	James E. Long (D)	37D, 13R	74D, 46R	Jesse Helms (R)	Terry Sanford (D)	8D, 3R	Bush/ Quayle (R) ✓
1990	James G. Martin (R)	Jim Gardner (R)	Rufus Edmisten (D)	Lacy Thornburg (D)	Ed Renfrow (D)	Harlan E. Boyles (D)	Bob Etheridge (D)	James Allen Graham (D)	John C. Brooks (D)	James E. Long (D)	37D, 13R	74D, 46R	Jesse Helms (R)	Terry Sanford (D)	8D, 3R	Bush/ Quayle (R) ✓
1991	James G. Martin (R)	Jim Gardner (R)	Rufus Edmisten (D)	Lacy Thornburg (D)	Ed Renfrow (D)	Harlan E. Boyles (D)	Bob Etheridge (D)	James Allen Graham (D)	John C. Brooks (D)	James E. Long (D)	36D, 14R	81D, 39R	Jesse Helms (R)	Terry Sanford (D)	7D, 4R	Bush/ Quayle (R) ✓
1992	James G. Martin (R)	Jim Gardner (R)	Rufus Edmisten (D)	Lacy Thornburg (D)	Ed Renfrow (D)	Harlan E. Boyles (D)	Bob Etheridge (D)	James Allen Graham (D)	John C. Brooks (D)	James E. Long (D)	36D, 14R	81D, 39R	Jesse Helms (R)	Terry Sanford (D)	7D, 4R	Bush/ Quayle (R) ✓
1993	Jim Hunt (D)	Dennis A. Wicker (D)	Rufus Edmisten (D)	Mike Easley (D)	Ralph Campbell Jr. (D)	Harlan E. Boyles (D)	Bob Etheridge (D)	James Allen Graham (D)	Harry Payne (D)	James E. Long (D)	39D, 11R	78D, 42R	Jesse Helms (R)	Lauch Faircloth (R)	8D, 4R	Bush/ Quayle (R) ✗
1994	Jim Hunt (D)	Dennis A. Wicker (D)	Rufus Edmisten (D)	Mike Easley (D)	Ralph Campbell Jr. (D)	Harlan E. Boyles (D)	Bob Etheridge (D)	James Allen Graham (D)	Harry Payne (D)	James E. Long (D)	39D, 11R	78D, 42R	Jesse Helms (R)	Lauch Faircloth (R)	8D, 4R	Bush/ Quayle (R) ✗
1995	Jim Hunt (D)	Dennis A. Wicker (D)	Rufus Edmisten (D)	Mike Easley (D)	Ralph Campbell Jr. (D)	Harlan E. Boyles (D)	Bob Etheridge (D)	James Allen Graham (D)	Harry Payne (D)	James E. Long (D)	26D, 24R	68R, 52D	Jesse Helms (R)	Lauch Faircloth (R)	8R, 4D	Bush/ Quayle (R) ✗
1996	Jim Hunt (D)	Dennis A. Wicker (D)	Janice Faulkner (D)	Mike Easley (D)	Ralph Campbell Jr. (D)	Harlan E. Boyles (D)	Bob Etheridge (D)	James Allen Graham (D)	Harry Payne (D)	James E. Long (D)	26D, 24R	68R, 52D	Jesse Helms (R)	Lauch Faircloth (R)	8R, 4D	Bush/ Quayle (R) ✗
1997	Jim Hunt (D)	Dennis A. Wicker (D)	**Elaine Marshall (D)**	Mike Easley (D)	Ralph Campbell Jr. (D)	Harlan E. Boyles (D)	Michael E. Ward (D)	James Allen Graham (D)	Harry Payne (D)	James E. Long (D)	30D, 20R	61R, 59D	Jesse Helms (R)	Lauch Faircloth (R)	6R, 6D	Dole/ Kemp (R) ✗
1998	Jim Hunt (D)	Dennis A. Wicker (D)	**Elaine Marshall (D)**	Mike Easley (D)	Ralph Campbell Jr. (D)	Harlan E. Boyles (D)	Michael E. Ward (D)	James Allen Graham (D)	Harry Payne (D)	James E. Long (D)	30D, 20R	61R, 59D	Jesse Helms (R)	Lauch Faircloth (R)	6R, 6D	Dole/ Kemp (R) ✗
1999	Jim Hunt (D)	Dennis A. Wicker (D)	**Elaine Marshall (D)**	Mike Easley (D)	Ralph Campbell Jr. (D)	Harlan E. Boyles (D)	Michael E. Ward (D)	James Allen Graham (D)	Harry Payne (D)	James E. Long (D)	35D, 15R	66D, 54R	Jesse Helms (R)	John Edwards (D)	7R, 5D	Dole/ Kemp (R) ✗
2000	Jim Hunt (D)	Dennis A. Wicker (D)	**Elaine Marshall (D)**	Mike Easley (D)	Ralph Campbell Jr. (D)	Harlan E. Boyles (D)	Michael E. Ward (D)	James Allen Graham (D)	Harry Payne (D)	James E. Long (D)	35D, 15R	66D, 54R	Jesse Helms (R)	John Edwards (D)	7R, 5D	Dole/ Kemp (R) ✗
2001	Mike Easley (D)	Bev Perdue (D)	**Elaine Marshall (D)**	Roy Cooper (D)	Ralph Campbell Jr. (D)	Richard H. Moore (D)	Michael E. Ward (D)	Meg Scott Phipps (D)	Cherie Berry (R)	James E. Long (D)	35D, 15R	62D, 58R	Jesse Helms (R)	John Edwards (D)	7R, 5D	Bush/ Cheney (R) ✓
2002	Mike Easley (D)	Bev Perdue (D)	**Elaine Marshall (D)**	Roy Cooper (D)	Ralph Campbell Jr. (D)	Richard H. Moore (D)	Michael E. Ward (D)	Meg Scott Phipps (D)	Cherie Berry (R)	James E. Long (D)	35D, 15R	62D, 58R	Jesse Helms (R)	John Edwards (D)	7R, 5D	Bush/ Cheney (R) ✓
2003	Mike Easley (D)	Bev Perdue (D)	**Elaine Marshall (D)**	Roy Cooper (D)	Ralph Campbell Jr. (D)	Richard H. Moore (D)	Michael E. Ward (D)	Britt Cobb (D)	Cherie Berry (R)	James E. Long (D)	28D, 22R	60D, 60R (Note: Was 61R, 59D after the 2002 elections, but Michael P. Decker switched parties from Republican to Democratic to establish split control of the House before the start of the 2003 session.)	Elizabeth Dole (R)	John Edwards (D)	7R, 6D	Bush/ Cheney (R) ✓
2004	Mike Easley (D)	Bev Perdue (D)	**Elaine Marshall (D)**	Roy Cooper (D)	Ralph Campbell Jr. (D)	Richard H. Moore (D)	Patricia N. Willoughby (D)	Britt Cobb (D)	Cherie Berry (R)	James E. Long (D)	28D, 22R	60D, 60R	Elizabeth Dole (R)	John Edwards (D)	7R, 6D	Bush/ Cheney (R) ✓
2005	Mike Easley (D)	Bev Perdue (D)	**Elaine Marshall (D)**	Roy Cooper (D)	Les Merritt (R)	Richard H. Moore (D)	June Atkinson (D)	**Steve Troxler (R)**	Cherie Berry (R)	James E. Long (D)	29D, 21R	63D, 57R	Elizabeth Dole (R)	Richard Burr (R)	7R, 6D	Bush/ Cheney (R) ✓
2006	Mike Easley (D)	Bev Perdue (D)	**Elaine Marshall (D)**	Roy Cooper (D)	Les Merritt (R)	Richard H. Moore (D)	June Atkinson (D)	**Steve Troxler (R)**	Cherie Berry (R)	James E. Long (D)	29D, 21R	63D, 57R	Elizabeth Dole (R)	Richard Burr (R)	7R, 6D	Bush/ Cheney (R) ✓
2007	Mike Easley (D)	Bev Perdue (D)	**Elaine Marshall (D)**	Roy Cooper (D)	Les Merritt (R)	Richard H. Moore (D)	June Atkinson (D)	**Steve Troxler (R)**	Cherie Berry (R)	James E. Long (D)	31D, 19R	68D, 52R	Elizabeth Dole (R)	Richard Burr (R)	7D, 6R	Bush/ Cheney (R) ✓
2008	Mike Easley (D)	Bev Perdue (D)	**Elaine Marshall (D)**	Roy Cooper (D)	Les Merritt (R)	Richard H. Moore (D)	June Atkinson (D)	**Steve Troxler (R)**	Cherie Berry (R)	James E. Long (D)	31D, 19R	68D, 52R	Elizabeth Dole (R)	Richard Burr (R)	7D, 6R	Bush/ Cheney (R) ✓
2009	Bev Perdue (D)	Walter Dalton (D)	**Elaine Marshall (D)**	Roy Cooper (D)	Beth Wood (D)	Janet Cowell (D)	June Atkinson (D)	**Steve Troxler (R)**	Cherie Berry (R)	Wayne Goodwin (D)	30D, 20R	68D, 52R	Kay Hagan (D)	Richard Burr (R)	8D, 5R	Obama/ Biden (D) ✓
2010	Bev Perdue (D)	Walter Dalton (D)	**Elaine Marshall (D)**	Roy Cooper (D)	Beth Wood (D)	Janet Cowell (D)	June Atkinson (D)	**Steve Troxler (R)**	Cherie Berry (R)	Wayne Goodwin (D)	30D, 20R	68D, 52R	Kay Hagan (D)	Richard Burr (R)	8D, 5R	Obama/ Biden (D) ✓
2011	Bev Perdue (D)	Walter Dalton (D)	**Elaine Marshall (D)**	Roy Cooper (D)	Beth Wood (D)	Janet Cowell (D)	June Atkinson (D)	**Steve Troxler (R)**	Cherie Berry (R)	Wayne Goodwin (D)	31R, 19D	67R, 52D, 1I	Kay Hagan (D)	Richard Burr (R)	7D, 6R	Obama/ Biden (D) ✓
2012	Bev Perdue (D)	Walter Dalton (D)	**Elaine Marshall (D)**	Roy Cooper (D)	Beth Wood (D)	Janet Cowell (D)	June Atkinson (D)	**Steve Troxler (R)**	Cherie Berry (R)	Wayne Goodwin (D)	31R, 19D	68R, 52D (Note: Independent representative Bert Jones became a Republican.)	Kay Hagan (D)	Richard Burr (R)	7D, 6R	Obama/ Biden (D) ✓
2013	Pat McCrory (R)	Dan Forest (R)	**Elaine Marshall (D)**	Roy Cooper (D)	Beth Wood (D)	Janet Cowell (D)	June Atkinson (D)	**Steve Troxler (R)**	Cherie Berry (R)	Wayne Goodwin (D)	33R, 17D	77R, 43D	Kay Hagan (D)	Richard Burr (R)	9R, 4D (Note: The 12th district was vacant from January to November 2014, after the resignation of Mel Watt.)	Romney/ Ryan (R) ✗
2014	Pat McCrory (R)	Dan Forest (R)	**Elaine Marshall (D)**	Roy Cooper (D)	Beth Wood (D)	Janet Cowell (D)	June Atkinson (D)	**Steve Troxler (R)**	Cherie Berry (R)	Wayne Goodwin (D)	33R, 17D	77R, 43D	Kay Hagan (D)	Richard Burr (R)	9R, 4D	Romney/ Ryan (R) ✗
2015	Pat McCrory (R)	Dan Forest (R)	**Elaine Marshall (D)**	Roy Cooper (D)	Beth Wood (D)	Janet Cowell (D)	June Atkinson (D)	**Steve Troxler (R)**	Cherie Berry (R)	Wayne Goodwin (D)	34R, 16D	74R, 45D, 1I (Note: A Democrat, Paul Tine, switched parties before the 2015 session and became an independent while caucusing with the Republicans.)	**Thom Tillis (R)**	Richard Burr (R)	10R, 3D	Romney/ Ryan (R) ✗
2016	Pat McCrory (R)	Dan Forest (R)	**Elaine Marshall (D)**	Roy Cooper (D)	Beth Wood (D)	Janet Cowell (D)	June Atkinson (D)	**Steve Troxler (R)**	Cherie Berry (R)	Wayne Goodwin (D)	34R, 16D	74R, 45D, 1I	**Thom Tillis (R)**	Richard Burr (R)	10R, 3D	Romney/ Ryan (R) ✗
2017	Roy Cooper (D)	Dan Forest (R)	**Elaine Marshall (D)**	Josh Stein (D)	Beth Wood (D)	Dale Folwell (R)	Mark Johnson (R)	**Steve Troxler (R)**	Cherie Berry (R)	**Mike Causey (R)**	35R, 15D	74R, 46D	**Thom Tillis (R)**	Richard Burr (R)	10R, 3D	Trump/ Pence (R) ✓
2018	Roy Cooper (D)	Dan Forest (R)	**Elaine Marshall (D)**	Josh Stein (D)	Beth Wood (D)	Dale Folwell (R)	Mark Johnson (R)	**Steve Troxler (R)**	Cherie Berry (R)	**Mike Causey (R)**	35R, 15D	74R, 46D	**Thom Tillis (R)**	Richard Burr (R)	10R, 3D	Trump/ Pence (R) ✓
2019	Roy Cooper (D)	Dan Forest (R)	**Elaine Marshall (D)**	Josh Stein (D)	Beth Wood (D)	Dale Folwell (R)	Mark Johnson (R)	**Steve Troxler (R)**	Cherie Berry (R)	**Mike Causey (R)**	29R, 21D	65R, 55D	**Thom Tillis (R)**	Richard Burr (R)	10R, 3D	Trump/ Pence (R) ✓
2020	Roy Cooper (D)	Dan Forest (R)	**Elaine Marshall (D)**	Josh Stein (D)	Beth Wood (D)	Dale Folwell (R)	Mark Johnson (R)	**Steve Troxler (R)**	Cherie Berry (R)	**Mike Causey (R)**	29R, 21D	65R, 55D	**Thom Tillis (R)**	Richard Burr (R)	9R, 3D (Note: The 11th district was vacant from April to December 2020, after the resignation of Mark Meadows.)	Trump/ Pence (R) ✓
2021	Roy Cooper (D)	Mark Robinson (R)	**Elaine Marshall (D)**	Josh Stein (D)	Beth Wood (D)	Dale Folwell (R)	Catherine Truitt (R)	**Steve Troxler (R)**	Josh Dobson (R)	**Mike Causey (R)**	28R, 22D	69R, 51D	**Thom Tillis (R)**	Richard Burr (R)	8R, 5D	Trump/ Pence (R) ✗
2022	Roy Cooper (D)	Mark Robinson (R)	**Elaine Marshall (D)**	Josh Stein (D)	Beth Wood (D)	Dale Folwell (R)	Catherine Truitt (R)	**Steve Troxler (R)**	Josh Dobson (R)	**Mike Causey (R)**	28R, 22D	69R, 51D	**Thom Tillis (R)**	Richard Burr (R)	8R, 5D	Trump/ Pence (R) ✗
2023	Roy Cooper (D)	Mark Robinson (R)	**Elaine Marshall (D)**	Josh Stein (D)	Beth Wood (D)	Dale Folwell (R)	Catherine Truitt (R)	**Steve Troxler (R)**	Josh Dobson (R)	**Mike Causey (R)**	**30R, 20D**	72R, 48D (Note: Democrat Tricia Cotham switched parties to Republican during the 2023 session.)	**Thom Tillis (R)**	**Ted Budd (R)**	7D, 7R	Trump/ Pence (R) ✗
2024	Roy Cooper (D)	Mark Robinson (R)	**Elaine Marshall (D)**	Josh Stein (D)	Jessica Holmes (D)	Dale Folwell (R)	Catherine Truitt (R)	**Steve Troxler (R)**	Josh Dobson (R)	**Mike Causey (R)**	**30R, 20D**	72R, 48D	**Thom Tillis (R)**	**Ted Budd (R)**	7D, 7R	Trump/ Pence (R) ✗
2025	**Josh Stein (D)**	**Rachel Hunt (D)**	**Elaine Marshall (D)**	**Jeff Jackson (D)**	**Dave Boliek (R)**	**Brad Briner (R)**	**Mo Green (D)**	**Steve Troxler (R)**	**Luke Farley (R)**	**Mike Causey (R)**	**30R, 20D**	**71R, 49D**	**Thom Tillis (R)**	**Ted Budd (R)**	**10R, 4D**	Trump/ Vance (R) ✓
2026	**Josh Stein (D)**	**Rachel Hunt (D)**	**Elaine Marshall (D)**	**Jeff Jackson (D)**	**Dave Boliek (R)**	**Brad Briner (R)**	**Mo Green (D)**	**Steve Troxler (R)**	**Luke Farley (R)**	**Mike Causey (R)**	**30R, 20D**	**71R, 49D**	**Thom Tillis (R)**	**Ted Budd (R)**	**10R, 4D**	Trump/ Vance (R) ✓
2027	**Josh Stein (D)**	**Rachel Hunt (D)**	**Elaine Marshall (D)**	**Jeff Jackson (D)**	**Dave Boliek (R)**	**Brad Briner (R)**	**Mo Green (D)**	**Steve Troxler (R)**	**Luke Farley (R)**	**Mike Causey (R)**	26R, 24D	71D, 48R, 1I	Roy Cooper (D)	**Ted Budd (R)**	11D, 3R	Trump/ Vance (R) ✓

Key to party colors and abbreviations for members of the U.S. Congress and other politicians or officials
Alaskan Independence (AKIP) Know Nothing (KN) American Labor (AL) Anti-Jacksonian (Anti-J); National Republican (NR) Anti-Administration (AA) Anti-Masonic (Anti-M) Conservative (Con) Covenant (Cov)	Democratic (D) Democratic–Farmer–Labor (DFL) Democratic–NPL (D-NPL) Dixiecrat (Dix), States' Rights (SR) Democratic-Republican (DR) Farmer–Labor (FL) Federalist (F); Pro-Administration (PA)	Free Soil (FS) Fusion (Fus) Greenback (GB) Independence (IPM) Jacksonian (J) Liberal (Lib) Libertarian (L) National Union (NU)	Nonpartisan League (NPL) Nullifier (N) Opposition Northern (O); Opposition Southern (O) Populist (Pop) Progressive (Prog) Prohibition (Proh) Readjuster (Rea)	Republican (R) Silver (Sv) Silver Republican (SvR) Socialist (Soc) Union (U) Unconditional Union (UU) Vermont Progressive (VP) Whig (W)	Independent (I) Nonpartisan (NP)

== See also ==
- Politics of North Carolina
- Elections in North Carolina
