= Seawell =

Seawell is a surname. Notable people with the surname include:

- Aaron A. F. Seawell (1864–1950), North Carolina politician and jurist
- Buie Seawell (born 1937), professor at the University of Denver, attorney, and former Colorado Democratic Party figure
- Donald Seawell (1912-2015), attorney and federal official from North Carolina
- Emmett Seawell (1862–1939), American judge, justice of the Supreme Court of California
- Herbert F. Seawell (1869–1949), North Carolina lawyer and politician
- Molly Elliot Seawell (1860–1916), American writer
- Samuel Seawell (fl. 1700), lawyer and printer in Massachusetts
- Wallace Seawell (1916–2007), photographer best known for his portraits of Hollywood stars
- William Seawell (1918-2005), Brigadier General in the United States Air Force

== See also ==
- Grantley Adams International Airport, formerly named Seawell Airport
- Justice Seawell (disambiguation)
