= Attorney General Olds =

Attorney General Olds may refer to:

- Chauncey N. Olds (1816–1890), Attorney General of Ohio
- Lewis P. Olds (fl. 1860s–1880s), Attorney General of North Carolina

== See also ==
- General Olds (disambiguation)
