= Senator Rodman =

Senator Rodman may refer to:

- Isaac P. Rodman (1822–1862), Rhode Island State Senate
- William B. Rodman Jr. (1889–1976), North Carolina State Senate
- William Rodman (Pennsylvania politician) (1757–1824), Pennsylvania State Senate
