= Senator Olds =

Senator Olds may refer to:

- Chauncey N. Olds (1816–1890), Ohio State Senate
- Edson B. Olds (1802–1869), Ohio State Senate
- Lewis P. Olds, North Carolina State Senate
- Walter Olds (1846–1925), Indiana State Senate
