= Benjamin Lacy =

Benjamin Lacy may refer to:

- Benjamin W. Lacy (1839–1895), Virginia politician and jurist
- Benjamin R. Lacy (1854–1929), North Carolina politician
