= Malcolm Buie Seawell =

American lawyer and politician (1909–1977)

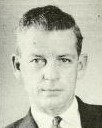
- Seawell circa 1959

41st Attorney General of North Carolina
- In office April 15, 1958 – February 29, 1960
- Governor: Luther H. Hodges
- Preceded by: George B. Patton
- Succeeded by: T. Wade Bruton

Personal details
- Born: December 18, 1909 Jonesboro, Lee County, North Carolina, U.S.
- Died: January 19, 1977 (aged 67) Lumberton, North Carolina, U.S.
- Party: Democratic
- Spouse: Frances Poole
- Children: 2
- Education: University of North Carolina at Chapel Hill; University of North Carolina School of Law

Malcolm Buie Seawell (December 18, 1909 – January 19, 1977) was an American lawyer and politician. A member of the Democratic Party, he served as North Carolina attorney general from 1958 to 1960. Seawell was raised in Lee County, North Carolina. After law school, he moved to Lumberton and joined a law firm. From 1942 to 1945, he worked for the U.S. Department of War in Washington, D.C. He then returned to Lumberton and successfully ran for the office of mayor in 1947. He held the post until the following year when he was appointed 9th Solicitorial District Solicitor. While working as solicitor, Seawell gained state-wide prominence for his aggressive efforts to prosecute the Ku Klux Klan (KKK), and was credited for ultimately pushing the organization out of Robeson County. Governor Luther H. Hodges later made him a judge before appointing him attorney general of North Carolina in 1958 to fill a vacancy.

As attorney general, Seawell felt that the decision of the United States Supreme Court, which he begrudgingly accepted, to desegregate schools in Brown v. Board of Education had to be respected and supported token integration efforts. His stance on Brown was controversial and cost him the support of conservative whites. He also opposed labor union activism and criticized the sit-in movement. In February 1960, Seawell resigned from the attorney general's office to seek the Democratic nomination to run for governor of North Carolina. Though he had the quiet backing of Hodges and the support of many North Carolina businessmen, his moderate stance on racial issues deprived him of wide popular support as racial liberals supported Terry Sanford and racial conservatives supported I. Beverly Lake. He placed third in the Democratic primary election and subsequently withdrew his candidacy.

In 1965, Governor Dan K. Moore appointed Seawell Chairman of the State Board of Elections. The following year Moore made him chair of a Committee on Law and Order, tasked with investigating the activities of the KKK. Seawell resigned in protest after accusing the State Bureau of Investigation of withholding documents evidencing criminal activity that would allow North Carolina to revoke the KKK's state charter. He shortly thereafter resigned from the State Board of Elections and withdrew from politics. Seawell later served as an executive for the Leaf Tobacco Exporter's Association and Tobacco Association of the United States in Chapel Hill. He retired in April 1976 and moved back to Lumberton, where he died in 1977.

== Early life ==
Malcolm Buie Seawell was born on December 18, 1909, in Jonesboro, Lee County, North Carolina, United States. He was the son of jurist Aaron A. F. Seawell and Bertha (née Smith) Seawell. He graduated from Sanford High School in 1927. He then attended the University of North Carolina at Chapel Hill, graduating in 1931. He went on to graduate from the University of North Carolina School of Law in 1934, and worked at the school's Institute of Government from then until the following year, when he was admitted to the North Carolina State Bar. He then spent the next three years working for the North Carolina Commissioner of Paroles before moving to Lumberton in January 1938 and joining a law firm. In April 1942, he became acting solicitor of the Lumberton district recorder's court. That December he was hired as an attorney by the Civilian Legal Personnel Committee of the U.S. Department of War in Washington, D.C. He worked there until 1945. Seawell married Frances Poole on June 9, 1936, and had a son, Malcolm Jr., and a daughter, Terrell.

== Political career ==
=== Local offices ===
Seawell, a member of the Democratic Party, ran in 1947 to become Mayor of Lumberton. He campaigned on a broad platform of impartial administration, the hiring of experts to manage zoning, increased playgrounds for children, and the holding of a referendum to adopt a city manager system of government. He defeated the incumbent mayor in the April primary election, 787 to 780. He proceeded to win the May general election, securing 380 of the 415 total votes, and was sworn in on May 7. As mayor he implemented a city manager system of government.

He held the office until the following year when he was appointed 9th Solicitorial District Solicitor (equivalent to district attorney) by North Carolina Governor R. Gregg Cherry, filling a vacancy created by Frank Ertel Carlyle's departure. He was sworn in on November 6, 1948, and vacated the office of mayor. The law firm of which he was a partner formally dissolved. He ran unopposed for the office in 1950 and won reelection in 1954 by a substantial margin. While serving as solicitor, Seawell worked closely with Robeson County Sheriff Malcolm McLeod to shut down illegal distilleries and arrest bootleggers.

He gained state-wide prominence for his efforts to combat the Ku Klux Klan (KKK), a white supremacist organization. He intensively researched its culture and protocols. In 1950, he told Imperial Wizard Thomas L. Hamilton of the Association of Carolina Klans to leave his solicitorial district or face legal action. Hamilton promptly moved to South Carolina.

In February 1952, Seawell, using a membership roster seized from a KKK recruiter, arrested 16 klansmen for violating an 1868 state statute prohibiting participation in secret political societies. Although the arrest warrants did not mention the KKK explicitly, Seawell told the detainees, "You were arrested...because you are members of the KKK." In response to reports that klansmen were abducting people from their homes and taking them to South Carolina to flog them, Seawell issued a threat to the group, stating that anyone caught doing so would be charged with first-degree burglary, a crime then punishable by death. Hamilton criticised the invocation of the 1868 law in a letter to Seawell, to which the latter responded by daring Hamilton to appear in Robeson County and face arrest. Twelve of the men were released after renouncing their KKK membership and the others were acquitted after a jury could not decide whether to convict them.

In March 1952, a cross was burned on the front lawn of Seawell's home, although police attributed the incident to pranksters and doubted that klansmen were responsible. Seawell was credited for ultimately pushing the KKK out of Robeson County.

On June 4, 1955, Governor Luther H. Hodges appointed Seawell to be the judge of North Carolina's new 16th Judicial District representing Robeson and Scotland counties. He was elected unopposed to keep the post in 1956. That year there was a vacancy in the Office of the North Carolina Attorney General. A group of Seawell's friends lobbied for him to be nominated to the post, but Hodges ultimately appointed George B. Patton instead.

=== State offices ===
In April 1958, Seawell was appointed by Hodges to become North Carolina Attorney General after Patton announced his resignation. He was sworn in on April 15 and vacated his judgeship.

Shortly after assuming office, Seawell declared his opposition to the strategy of "massive resistance", whereby governments would close public schools rather than follow court orders to racially desegregate them. He felt that the decision of the United States Supreme Court to integrate schools in Brown v. Board of Education had to be respected. While personally disappointed with the outcome of the case, he felt it would be easier to defend North Carolina's actions in court if he took a moderate approach towards segregation, and he supported token integration efforts. His stance on Brown caused conservative whites in North Carolina to consider him "soft on race". In late 1958, he said on the matter, "I intend to take my stand on the side of the law ... If this is politically inexpedient, dangerous, or fatal, I'll just have to be content with what my future holds for me."

Seawell was also opposed to labor union activism and aggressively sought the prosecution of organizer Boyd E. Payton following a period of labor unrest in 1959. He condemned the sit-in movement, which protested segregationist business practices, as he thought it worsened race relations. In January 1959, Hodges sent him to Monroe to argue on behalf of the state against the granting of a writ of habeas corpus to the defendants in the "Kissing Case", which concerned two young black boys who had been sentenced to juvenile reformatory school after being kissed by a white girl. Seawell attempted to use the hearing to present himself as more racially conservative, specifically by intensely questioning civil rights activist Robert F. Williams on the witness stand. The judge in the case ultimately denied the petition for the writ. Seawell subsequently denounced some civil rights groups, chiefly those who had intervened in the "Kissing Case", as a greater threat to peace in North Carolina than the KKK.

Upon the commencement of the Greensboro sit-ins in early 1960 by black college students aimed at desegregating lunch counters, Seawell suggested that store owners could have demonstrators removed for trespassing and advised university administrators to keep their students on campus.

On February 20, 1960, Seawell announced his intention to seek the Democratic nomination to become Governor of North Carolina and sent a letter of resignation from the Attorney's General office to Hodges, effective February 29. He ran as a fiscal conservative, emphasizing industrialization as a means of improving North Carolinians' wages and supporting public schools. His opponents were Terry Sanford, I. Beverly Lake, and John Larkins. Seawell had the quiet backing of Hodges and the support of many North Carolina businessmen. He also had the support of his cousin Chub Seawell, who had run as a Republican candidate for governor in 1952.

Sanford and Larkins were both convinced that Hodges had recruited Seawell, although both men denied this. Sanford was disappointed that Seawell had entered the race, and later said that had he not run he would have appointed him to the North Carolina Supreme Court. He was the only candidate at this stage to publicly affirm that the Brown ruling was legally legitimate. However, his moderate stance on racial issues deprived him of wide popular support; racial liberals supported Sanford, and racial conservatives supported Lake. He placed third in the May Democratic primary election, garnering 101,148 votes. He subsequently dropped out of the race and endorsed Sanford in the runoff election, saying that Sanford's moderate stance on school desegregation would guarantee the continued operation of public schools, unlike Lake's strong segregationist position.

In 1961, North Carolina's two U.S. Senators recommended that President John F. Kennedy nominate Seawell to the second federal judgeship of North Carolina's U.S. Middle District. He was ultimately passed over for the appointment, a decision he attributed to the lobbying of labor unions.

In 1965, Governor Dan K. Moore appointed Seawell Chairman of the State Board of Elections. At the first board meeting he chaired the body adopted a policy that "The law is to be obeyed." When the federal Voting Rights Act of 1965 was passed, Seawell expressed his disapproval of it but said that he was bound to enforce it. He was troubled by the abolition of literacy tests under the law, saying "this means the moron or the nit-wit can vote without knowing the issues". In January 1966 Moore appointed Seawell chairman of a Committee on Law and Order, tasked with investigating the activities of the KKK. While working on the committee Seawell came into conflict with the State Bureau of Investigation, which he felt was withholding documents evidencing criminal activity that would allow North Carolina to revoke the KKK's state charter. Moore sided with the head of the bureau, asserting that it had turned over all relevant documents to the committee. Seawell resigned from the committee on June 24 in protest of the withholding of documents. On July 28, he resigned from his position as Chairman of the State Board of Elections and declared that he had no further political ambitions.

== Later life ==
Seawell later served as an executive for the Leaf Tobacco Exporter's Association and Tobacco Association of the United States in Chapel Hill. He retired in April 1976 and moved back to Lumberton. He died in his sleep at his home on January 19, 1977.

Party political offices
| Preceded by George B. Patton | Democratic nominee for Attorney General of North Carolina; 1958 | Succeeded by T. Wade Bruton |
