= Justice Seawell =

Justice Seawell may refer to:

- Aaron A. F. Seawell (1864–1950), associate justice of the North Carolina Supreme Court
- Emmett Seawell (1862–1939), associate justice of the Supreme Court of California
