= Dennis G. Brummitt =

American politician

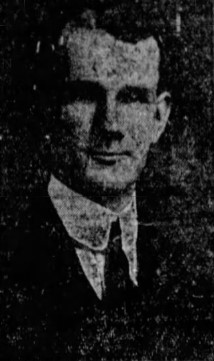

Dennis Garfield Brummitt (February 7, 1881-1935) was Attorney General of North Carolina and Speaker of the North Carolina House of Representatives.

He grew up on a farm in Granville County, North Carolina during the Great Depression.

He graduated from Wake Forest College and received his law license in 1907. He was active in the county Democratic Party and served as mayor of Oxford, North Carolina.

He served in the state house from 1915 to 1919 and was elected Attorney General in 1924. He was Speaker of the House in 1919. He married Kate Hays Fleming.

After his death, he was succeeded as Attorney General of North Carolina by Aaron Ashley Flowers Seawell.
