= General Olds =

General Olds may refer to:

- Robert Olds (1896–1943), U.S. Army Air Forces major general
- Robin Olds (1922–2007), U.S. Air Force brigadier general

== See also ==
- Attorney General Olds (disambiguation)
