= Tazewell L. Hargrove =

North Carolina politician (1830–1889)

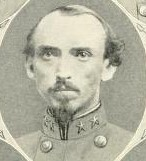
Hargrove in 1901

Tazewell Lee Hargrove (1830 – December 16, 1889) was a lawyer, politician, and Confederate Army officer who served as Attorney General of North Carolina. A Democrat before the Civil War he held office as a Republican after the war.

He was born in Townsville, North Carolina, and graduated from Randolph Macon College in 1848. He served with the 44th North Carolina Infantry Regiment, was a lieutenant colonel, and reportedly helped defend a bridge against a superior force for several hours during the Civil War. He was in Company A. He was captured.

A lawyer in Granville County, North Carolina, he served as a delegate to North Carolina's Secession Convention.

In 1872 at the Republican Party's state convention, he was chosen unanimously as nominee for attorney general. He was preceded as North Carolina Attorney General by William Marcus Shipp and succeeded by Thomas S. Kenan.
