= Buie Seawell =

American political activist (born 1937)

- Born: Malcolm Buie Seawell Jr. July 8, 1937 (age 89); Lumberton, North Carolina, U.S.
- Education: Davidson College, Union Seminary - Richmond, University of Denver
- Occupations: educator, political activist, minister, attorney

Malcolm Buie Seawell Jr. (born July 8, 1937) is an American professor at the University of Denver. He is also an attorney, and former Colorado Democratic Party chair. Born in North Carolina, he is the son of the state's former Attorney General, Malcolm Buie Seawell.

== Education and political leadership ==
Seawell earned a bachelor's degree from Davidson College and a master's degree in Theology from Richmond, Virginia's Union Seminary, after which he served as a Presbyterian minister in Alabama and North Carolina. After earning a Juris Doctor degree from the University of Denver, Seawell practiced law in Colorado. He served Colorado Governor Richard Lamm as Director of the Colorado Office of Energy Conservation and later as Legislative Liaison. He later worked for Senator Gary Hart as Chief of Staff for his Senate office and as a member of his 1984 presidential campaign.

Seawell served as chairman of the state's Democratic Party from 1985 to 1989, during which time he dramatically increased the party budget. He unsuccessfully ran for the Democratic Party nomination for the United States Senate in 1989–1990.

== Professional service and family ==
Seawell worked at the University of Colorado at Denver from 1993 to 1995. He was founder and director of the Norwest Public Policy Center and the Mind of Colorado at UCD, and taught in the Graduate School of Public Policy. He joined the Daniels Business College at the University of Denver in 1995. In 2003, he was honored with the university's "Distinguished Teacher of the Year" Award.

Seawell has three children from his first marriage to Dorothy Burns, as well as three children from his second marriage to Marjorie Beaird.

Seawell's daughter, Mary Seawell, was elected to the Denver School Board in 2009.
