= Boyd E. Payton =

Boyd Ellsworth Payton (April 21, 1908 – 1984) was a labor organizer born in Bobbin, West Virginia. He eventually began work at the Chemical Division of the Celanese Corporation of American plant. During his time there he established the Celanese Benefit Club to help employees in need of financial assistance. In 1936 he helped start the Celabese Local No. 1874 of the Textile Workers Union of America (TWUA). Payton became the chapters president and advocated the hiring of black workers to compensate for the labor shortage caused by World War II.

In 1943 the TWUA named Payton regional director for Virginia, West Virginia and Maryland. In 1953 Payton was appointed director of the southern region, which was headquartered in Charlotte, North Carolina.

Payton is most remembered for his work in the Harriet-Henderson Mills strike which began in 1958. Payton went to Henderson, North Carolina to assist in negotiations between two local TWUA chapters and the Harriet-Henderson Mill. The strike began after the mill tried to revise the existing worker contract. The mill called in strike breakers, which led to violence across the mill community. There were 16 bombings, over 150 arrests and even Payton himself was assaulted. Union members felt that the textile industry was trying to subvert all unions. They were also unhappy with state government and policy after the Highway Patrol and National Guard were sent to protect strike breakers.

Payton, along with seven other men, was arrested in June 1959 for conspiring to dynamite a Carolina Power & Light Company substation and planning to destroy two mill buildings. The only evidence the state had against Payton was a phone call in which he warned his caller that the phone was bugged. Payton was sentenced to six to ten years in prison in 1960. Evangelist Billy Graham, Harry Golden and Burlington Industries President J. Spencer Love proclaimed his innocence and called for his release. Governor Terry Sanford commuted the sentences of Boyd and other union activists on July 4, 1961. On December 31, 1964, he granted Boyd a full pardon.

Payton wrote a book about his experience called Scapegoat: Prejudice/Politics/Prison.

After his time in prison Payton worked for the United States Department of Labor, from which he retired in 1977. Payton died in 1984 and is buried in Charlotte, NC.

== Works cited ==
- Glass, Brent D. (1992). The Textile Industry in North Carolina: A History. Raleigh: North Carolina Department of Cultural Resources Division of Archives and History. ISBN 9780865262560.
