= George B. Patton =

American jurist and politician

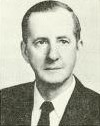

40th Attorney General of North Carolina
- In office August 21, 1956 – March 25, 1958
- Governor: Luther H. Hodges
- Preceded by: William B. Rodman Jr.
- Succeeded by: Malcolm Buie Seawell

Personal details
- Born: August 27, 1898 Franklin, North Carolina, United States
- Died: July 2, 1987 (aged 88) Franklin, North Carolina
- Party: Democratic Party
- Spouse: Kate Penland
- Education: University of North Carolina

George Brabson Patton (August 27, 1898 – July 2, 1987) was an American jurist and politician who served as North Carolina Attorney General from August 21, 1956, to March 25, 1958.

== Early life ==
George Brabson Patton was born on August 27, 1898, in Franklin, North Carolina, United States to Erwin Patton and Maggie Crawford. He studied law at the University of North Carolina from 1921 to 1923. He married Kate Penland on April 30, 1928.

== Career ==
Patton became licensed to practice law in February 1923. He served as Mayor of Franklin from 1928 to 1933 and again from 1936 to 1938. He was the Macon County Attorney from 1933 to 1939. In 1939 Patton represented Macon County in the North Carolina House of Representatives. Shortly thereafter he became an assistant in the North Carolina Attorney General's office. He served as a special judge on the North Carolina Superior Court from 1947 to 1956.

On August 21, 1956, Governor Luther H. Hodges appointed Patton North Carolina Attorney General, filling in a vacancy created by William B. Rodman Jr.'s departure. The appointment was well received by state newspapers. He won election to a full four-year term on November 6. In March 1957 he went to Washington D.C. to testify before U.S. Senate Subcommittee on Constitutional Rights on President Dwight D. Eisenhower's proposed civil rights legislation. He declared his opposition to the bill, saying race relations in North Carolina had worsened since the decision of the United States Supreme Court to integrate schools in Brown v. Board of Education in May 1954. He also stated that existing federal civil rights statutes "will cause dissension, and, regrettably, even violence, for years". In June he dismissed the head of the State Bureau of Investigation, Jimmy Powell, citing "morale conditions" in the agency.

Patton resigned on March 25, 1958, to compete in the Democratic primary for the resident judgeship in the 30th Judicial District. He won the Democratic primary and faced no opposition in the general election. In June Hodges appointed him to the vacant judgeship to serve in the interim until the end of the year. Patton was sworn in on June 16. He was sworn in again in January 1959. He held the office for eight years, and then subsequently served as an emergency judge for the Superior Court until he died on July 2, 1987, at a hospital in Franklin.

== Works cited ==
- North Carolina Manual. Raleigh: North Carolina Secretary of State. 1957. OCLC 244106583.

Party political offices
Preceded by Harry McMullan	Democratic nominee for Attorney General of North Carolina; 1956	Succeeded by Malcolm Buie Seawell
