= T. Wade Bruton =

American lawyer and politician

Wade Bruton
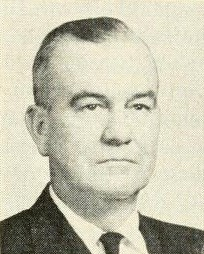

42nd Attorney General of North Carolina
- In office March 2, 1960 – 1969
- Governor: Luther H. Hodges; Terry Sanford; Dan K. Moore
- Preceded by: Malcolm B. Seawell
- Succeeded by: Robert Burren Morgan

Member of the North Carolina House of Representatives from Montgomery County
- In office 1929–1933
- Preceded by: Oscar Haywood
- Succeeded by: Daniel A. Monroe

Personal details
- Born: Thomas Wade Bruton; September 10, 1902 Capelsie, Montgomery County, North Carolina
- Died: May 21, 1976 (aged 73) Raleigh, North Carolina
- Party: Democratic
- Occupation: lawyer

Thomas Wade Bruton (September 10, 1902 – May 21, 1976) was an American lawyer and politician who served as the Attorney General of North Carolina from March 2, 1960, through January 1, 1969.

== Early life ==
Thomas Wade Bruton was born on September 10, 1902, in Capelsie, North Carolina, United States to David Dudley Bruton and Susan Eleanor Wade. He attended Montgomery County public schools and the Virginia Military Institute. He received a bachelor's degree from Duke University in 1925 and from then until 1927 he attended the Duke University Law School. He married Marion Sheppard Piatt the following year. She died in February 1960.

== Career ==
Bruton began practicing law in 1927. The following year he sought a seat in the North Carolina House of Representatives, representing Montgomery County. He lost the first primary election by 10 votes, but in the run-off contest won by five votes. In the subsequent general election he won by 23 votes. He ultimately served two terms in the House in 1929 and 1931. He served three months in 1933 as a clerk of court in Montgomery County before joining the state attorney general's office as Assistant Attorney General of North Carolina on July 1, 1933.

Having served in the National Guard since 1930, in 1942 he was called into service by the United States Army with the rank of captain. In early 1945 he was sent to Germany to head the army's prosecution division in Wiesbaden, and prepared trials for German war criminals. He returned to the United States the following year and resumed his post as Assistant Attorney General of North Carolina.

On February 20, 1960, Governor Luther H. Hodges declared that he would appoint Bruton Attorney General of North Carolina following the resignation of Malcolm B. Seawell. He was sworn in on March 2. During his tenure, assistant attorneys general were entrusted with advising different departments of state government. He held daily staff meetings to coordinate their work and make changes to their assignments. He retired from the National Guard with the rank of colonel in 1962.

He won two full terms as attorney general until losing in a Democratic primary to Robert Burren Morgan in 1968. Following the end of his tenure, he became a lobbyist.

== Works cited ==
- North Carolina Manual. Raleigh: North Carolina Secretary of State. 1961. OCLC 244106586.
- Bell, Harold Leonard (1972). The Office of State Attorney General in the South (PhD thesis). University of Illinois at Urbana-Champaign. OCLC 77774350.

Party political offices
Preceded by Malcolm Buie Seawell	Democratic nominee for Attorney General of North Carolina; 1960, 1964	Succeeded by Robert Burren Morgan
