= Harry McMullan =

American politician

Harry McMullan (23 July 1884 – 24 June 1955) was an American lawyer and politician who served as North Carolina Attorney General from 1938 until his death in 1955. He served in that office longer than any other person to date (17 years).

McMullan served in the North Carolina Senate from 1929 through 1933, representing the Beaufort County area. He subsequently served as director of the Collections and Assessments Division of the state Department of Revenue, chairman of the North Carolina Industrial Commission, and assistant attorney general of the state. In 1938, Governor Clyde R. Hoey elevated McMullan to the position of attorney general to replace Aaron A. F. Seawell, who had been appointed to the North Carolina Supreme Court.

Party political offices
Preceded by Aaron A. F. Seawell	Democratic nominee for Attorney General of North Carolina; 1938, 1940, 1944, 1948, 1952	Succeeded by George B. Patton
Legal offices
Preceded by Aaron A. F. Seawell	Attorney General of North Carolina; 1938–1955	Succeeded by William B. Rodman Jr.
