= William Marcus Shipp =

American politician (1819–1890)

William Marcus Shipp (November 9, 1819 - June 28, 1890) was a lawyer, legislator, and judge in North Carolina who served as Attorney General of North Carolina. His father Bartlett Shipp was a lawyer who served in the War of 1812 and served two terms in the North Carolina House of Commons.

Shipp attended Pleasant Retreat Institute in Lincolnton and the University of North Carolina. He set up his law practice in Rutherfordton and represented Rutherford County in North Carolina's House of Commons from 1854 to 1855. He was a delegate to the state's constitutional convention in 1861 and 1862 and was elected to the North Carolina Senate in 1862. He was a captain in the Confederate Army before becoming a judge.

He served as Attorney General of North Carolina. He lost re-election in 1872 to Tazewell L. Hargrove.

From 1872 to 1881 he was a lawyer in Charlotte, North Carolina.

As a judge, he presided over Tom Dula's murder case.

He married twice and had five children. Catherine LaFayette Cameron Shipp was his wife. She established Fassifern School in Lincolnton in 1907. It was relocated to Hendersonville.
