= William B. Rodman Jr. =

American judge

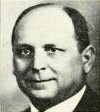
Rodman c. 1955

William Blount Rodman Jr. (1889–1976)—also known as William B. Rodman III, as his father was named William B. Rodman II—was a North Carolina lawyer and politician. He served in the North Carolina Senate (1937–1939) and the North Carolina House of Representatives (1950–1955), as North Carolina Attorney General (1955–1956) and as a justice of the North Carolina Supreme Court (1956–1965).

He was the grandson of William B. Rodman, who was also a state Supreme Court justice.

Legal offices
Preceded by Harry McMullan	Attorney General of North Carolina; 1955–1956	Succeeded by George B. Patton
