= Benjamin R. Lacy =

American politician (1854–1929)

Benjamin Rice Lacy
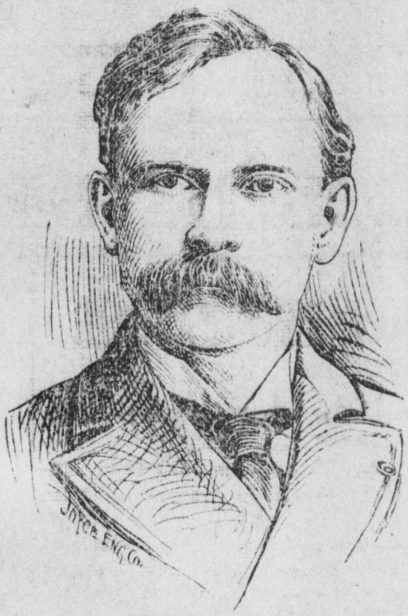
- Engraving, 1901

19th North Carolina State Treasurer
- In office January 15, 1901 – February 21, 1929
- Governor: Charles Brantley Aycock; Robert Broadnax Glenn; William Walton Kitchin; Locke Craig; Thomas Walter Bickett; Cameron A. Morrison; Angus Wilton McLean; Oliver Max Gardner
- Preceded by: William H. Worth
- Succeeded by: Nathan O'Berry

Personal details
- Born: June 19, 1854 Raleigh, Wake County, North Carolina
- Died: February 21, 1929 (aged 74)
- Party: Democratic Party
- Spouse: Mary Burwell
- Profession: Locomotive engineer, public servant

Benjamin Rice Lacy (June 19, 1854 – February 21, 1929) served as North Carolina Commissioner of Labor from 1893–1897 and 1899–1901, and as North Carolina State Treasurer from 1901–1929. Lacy died one month after taking office for his eighth term as Treasurer.

Lacy's father, Rev. Drury Lacy II, was the president of Davidson College and his grandfather, Drury Lacy, was president of Hampden–Sydney College.

Party political offices
Preceded by Benjamin F. Aycock	Democratic nominee for North Carolina State Treasurer; 1900, 1904, 1908, 1912, 1916, 1920, 1924, 1928	Succeeded by Nathan O'Berry
Political offices
Preceded by William H. Worth	Treasurer of North Carolina; 1901–1929	Succeeded by Nathan O'Berry
