= Lewis P. Olds =

American politician

Lewis P. Olds was an American lawyer and politician who served as North Carolina Attorney General from 1869 to 1870.

In 1868, he was offered the presidency of the University of North Carolina at Chapel Hill. Kemp P. Battle wrote, "As there was no treasury in sight from which a salary could be drawn, Mr. Olds wisely declined [the offer of the presidency]." According to Battle, Olds was the son-in-law of then-Governor William W. Holden. He represented Wake County in the North Carolina Senate in 1870-71, when he voted against removing his father-in-law from office.

Governor William W. Holden found Attorney General William M. Coleman to be deficient but—not wishing to remove him—arranged for President Ulysses S. Grant to offer him a consulship in April 1869. With Coleman's resignation creating a vacancy, the governor appointed Olds on June 1 to fill the vacancy. The State Republican Party Convention declined to formally nominate him for the office in the 1870 elections, instead endorsing Samuel F. Phillips.

President Ulysses S. Grant appointed Olds to be U.S. consul to St. Helena, where he served in 1876 and 1877.

Olds' first wife, Pauline Eugenia Olds, died of typhoid fever in 1864, at the age of 36. He married his second wife, Laura Holden, on January 28, 1869. She was committed to an insane asylum in April 1888, and died on March 11, 1895.

== Works cited ==
- Brisson, Jim D. (April 2011). "'Civil Government Was Crumbling Around Me': The Kirk-Holden War of 1870". The North Carolina Historical Review. 8 (2): 123–163. JSTOR 23523540.
- North Carolina Manual (PDF). Raleigh: North Carolina Department of the Secretary of State. 2011. OCLC 2623953. Archived from the original (PDF) on 2023-08-02.
- Raper, Horace W. (1985). William W. Holden: North Carolina's Political Enigma. University of North Carolina Press. ISBN 9780807850602.

Legal offices
Preceded by William M. Coleman	Attorney General of North Carolina; 1869–1870	Succeeded by William M. Shipp
