= North Carolina Attorney General =

Attorney general for the U.S. state of North Carolina

Attorney General of North Carolina
- Seal of the attorney general

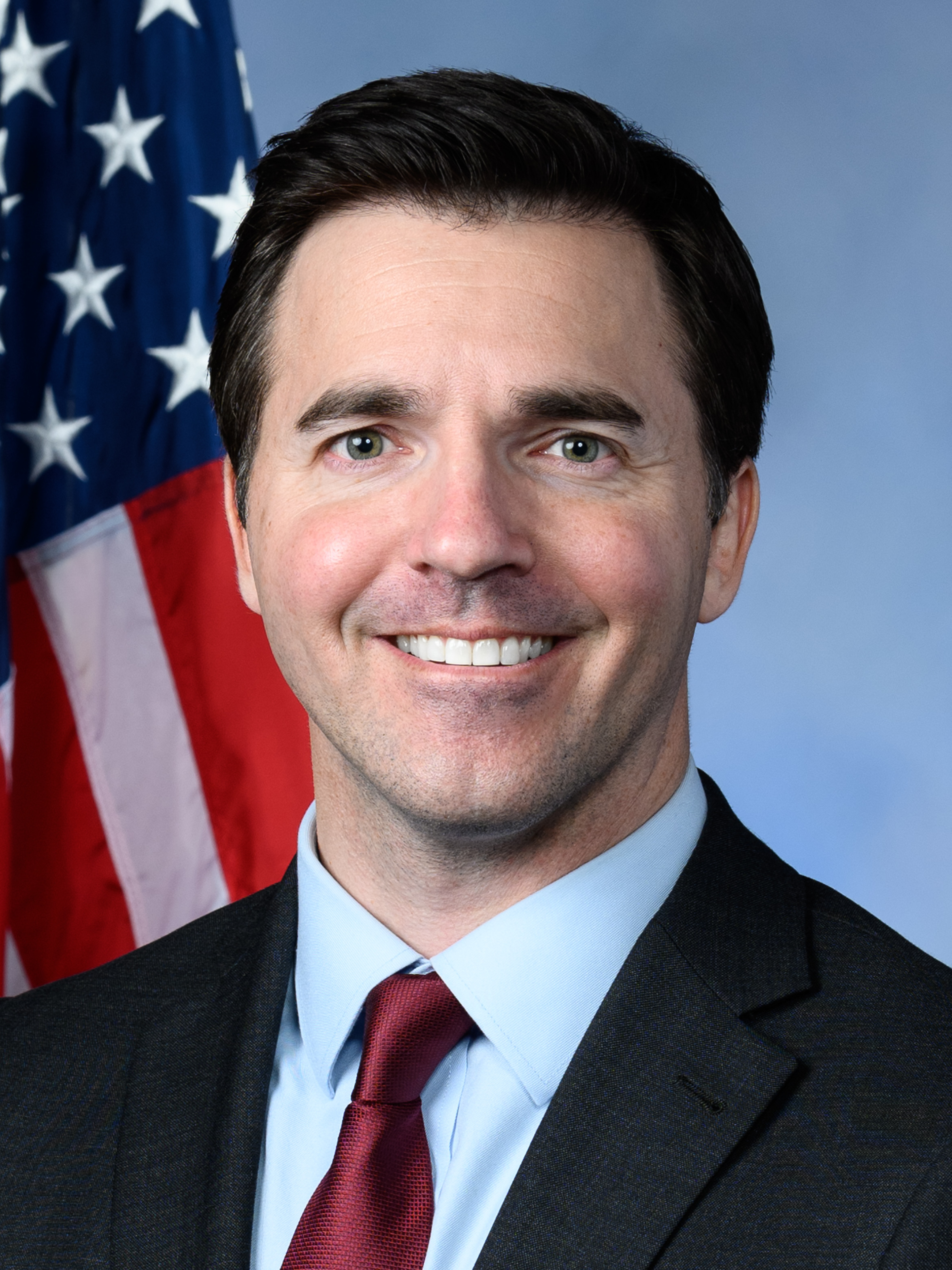
- Incumbent; Jeff Jackson since January 1, 2025
- Member of: Council of State
- Term length: Four years
- Inaugural holder: Waightstill Avery
- Formation: 1776
- Succession: Seventh
- Salary: US$168,384 annually
- Website: ncdoj.gov

The attorney general of North Carolina is a statewide elected office in the U.S. state of North Carolina. The attorney general is a constitutional officer responsible for representing state agencies in legal matters, supplying other state officials and prosecutors with legal advice, and leading the North Carolina Department of Justice. The incumbent attorney general, Jeff Jackson, assumed office on January 1, 2025. The position of attorney general dates back to North Carolina's colonial history. North Carolina's 1776 constitution established the office as an official appointed by the North Carolina General Assembly. The state's 1868 constitution made the attorney general an elected executive official with their duties prescribed by law. Since 1971, the officer has sat on the North Carolina Council of State.

== History ==
The title "Attorney General" was used in the colonial territory encompassing what became North Carolina as early as 1677, when George Durant was appointed by Governor John Jenkins. In 1697 the British Crown appointed an attorney general for the entire Province of Carolina; such attorneys general would serve the entire province until it was split into the provinces North Carolina and South Carolina and both received their own attorneys general. The attorneys general in North Carolina and other British American colonies served as representatives of and exercised the same powers as the British attorneys general. The last colonial attorney general, Thomas McGuire, was appointed in 1767 and, according to the Office of the North Carolina Secretary of State, "presumably" served until the outbreak of the American Revolution.

Following the start of the revolution, the new states of the United States ratified constitutions, most of which provided for the position of attorney general. The Constitution of North Carolina, ratified on December 18, 1776, established the office in Article XIII. Under the article, the attorney general was to be appointed by the North Carolina General Assembly and to serve as long as they maintained "good behavior", similar to judges. Like other state attorneys general, North Carolina's officer exercised authority derived from English common law, colonial traditions, and state laws. The first attorney general for the independent state of North Carolina was Waightstill Avery, who served from 1777 to 1779. The General Assembly placed significant limits on the attorney general's authority, appointing their deputies and, by 1806, curtailing their ability to prosecute cases to one of six specified jurisdictions in the state. In 1835, a new state constitution provided for the attorney general to serve a four-year term.

The 1868 constitution made the attorney general an elected member of the executive branch. Under this framework, the attorney general served as the legal advisor to the North Carolina Council of State, but was not formally one of its members. The constitution made the attorney general an ex officio member of the State Board of Education and provided for the officer's duties to be determined by law. That year, the General Assembly prescribed eight statutory duties for the attorney general: defending the state's interests in legal matters, representing government agencies upon request, advising local prosecutors, delivering an annual report to the legislature, summarizing reports from local prosecutors, providing legal advice to the legislature and other government agencies, delivering funds to the state, and maintaining a record of their office's accounts. Most prosecutions for criminal offenses were made the responsibility of district solicitors.

The state's new constitution in 1971 altered the attorney general's office and duties little, though it made the officer a full member of the Council of State and removed them from the State Board of Education. The North Carolina Department of Justice—combining the Office of the Attorney General, the State Bureau of Investigation (SBI), the General Statutes Commission, and the police information network—was created by the General Assembly in 1971. In the early 1970s, incumbent Robert Burren Morgan shifted the office's emphasis from government legal matters and law enforcement towards consumer protection, and raised its political profile by forming relationships with the governor, the General Assembly, and other states' attorneys general. In 1984, a referendum approved an amendment to the constitution to require that the attorney general be licensed to practice law in North Carolina. In 2014, the SBI was removed from the attorney general's purview and made an independent agency responsible to the governor. The incumbent attorney general, Democrat Jeff Jackson, assumed office on January 1, 2025.

== Powers and duties ==
Article III, Section 7, of the Constitution of North Carolina stipulates the popular election of the attorney general every four years. The office holder is not subject to term limits. In the event of a vacancy in the office, the Governor of North Carolina has the authority to appoint a successor until a candidate is elected at the next general election for members of the General Assembly. Per Article III, Section 8 of the constitution, the attorney general sits on the Council of State. They are seventh in the line of succession to the governor. As with all Council of State officers, the attorney general's salary is fixed by the General Assembly and cannot be reduced during their term of office. As of 2025, the attorney general's annual salary is $168,384.

The attorney general serves as the state government's top legal officer. Their duties and responsibilities are mostly enumerated in North Carolina's general statutes. Their duties include providing legal representation to all state agencies; supplying advice upon request to judges, magistrates, and county and city attorneys in accordance with the American Bar Association Model Rules of Professional Conduct; and addressing appeals to state trial court verdicts. The attorney general may initiate legal action in the public interest or intervene in proceedings before any federal and state courts, regulatory officers, agencies or bodies on behalf of the state. The attorney general is restricted by law from contravening the stances of the General Assembly in court proceedings or arguing that its actions are unconstitutional.

Per statute, the attorney general renders nonbinding legal opinions upon questions of law submitted by the General Assembly, the governor, or any other state officer. (Note: The attorney general's office states that its advice "should be complied with by [s]tate agencies and officials." On sporadic occasions when the attorney general has felt unable to provide a suitable opinion, they have redirected questions for advice to the justices of the North Carolina Supreme Court.) Despite their role as the top legal representative for the state, attorneys' general views are often passed over by governors, who frequently seek the advice of their appointed legal counsel. Generally, the attorney general cannot give legal advice to private entities. The General Assembly has also affirmed that the attorney general has power vested in them by common law tradition, as long as such authority is exercised in a manner consistent with state laws and the constitution. The Supreme Court of North Carolina has not delineated the scope of the officer's common law authority, though it has ruled that this bestows upon the attorney general a "duty to prosecute all actions necessary for the protection and defense of the property and revenue of the sovereign people of North Carolina." The attorney general is forbidden by law from assuming the stance in court litigation that any segment of state legislation is unconstitutional.

The attorney general leads the North Carolina Department of Justice and appoints its director. It is in charge of the state crime lab. They cannot prosecute cases themselves unless asked to do so by a local district attorney. The attorney general does not have any authority over courts, local district attorneys, or local law enforcement agencies.

== Political trends and dynamics ==
Historically, most North Carolina attorneys general have been Democrats. As of 2024, the last Republican to win election to the office was Zeb V. Walser in 1896. Republican James H. Carson Jr. was appointed to the office in 1974 to fill a vacancy and served for several months.

Beginning in 1968, every Democrat elected to the attorney general's office has eventually campaigned to be elected governor except for Morgan, who was elected to the U.S. Senate in 1974. As of 2024, three of them, Mike Easley, Roy Cooper, and Josh Stein were successful, while two others were unsuccessful.

== List of attorneys general ==
=== Elected by the legislature ===
Attorneys General
No.	Attorney General	Term in office	Source
1	Thomas McGuire	1767 – 1776	
2	Waightstill Avery	1777 – 1779	
3	James Iredell	1779 – 1782	
4	Alfred Moore	1782 – 1791	
5	John Haywood	1792 – 1795	
6	Blake Baker Jr.	1795 – 1803	
7	Henry Seawell	1803 – 1808	
8	Oliver Fitts	1808 – 1810	
9	William Miller	1810	
10	Hutchins Gordon Burton	1810 – 1816	
11	William P. Drew	1816 – 1824	
12	James F. Taylor	1825 – 1828	
13	Robert H. Jones	1828	
14	Romulus Mitchell Saunders	1828 – 1834	
15	John Reeves Jones Daniel	1835 – 1841	
16	Hugh McQueen	1841 – 1842	
17	Spier Whitaker	1842 – 1846	
18	Edward Stanly	1846 – 1848	
19	Bartholomew F. Moore	1848 – 1851	
20	William Eaton Jr.	1851 – 1852	
21	Matt Whitaker Ransom	1853 – 1855	
22	Joseph B. Batchelor	1855 – 1856	
23	William Henry Bailey	1857	
24	William A. Jenkins	1857 – 1862	
25	Sion Hart Rogers	1863 – 1868	

=== Popularly elected ===
Attorneys General
No.	Attorney General	Term in office	Party	Source
26	William M. Coleman	1868 – 1869	Republican	
27	Lewis P. Olds	1869 – 1870	Republican	
28	William Marcus Shipp	1870 – 1873	Democratic	
29	Tazewell L. Hargrove	1873 – 1877	Republican	
30	Thomas S. Kenan	1877 – 1885	Democratic	
31	Theodore F. Davidson	1885 – 1893	Democratic	
32	Frank I. Osborne	1893 – 1897	Democratic	
33	Zeb V. Walser	1897 – 1900	Republican	
34	Robert Dick Douglas	1900 – 1901	Republican	
35	Robert D. Gilmer	1901 – 1909	Democratic	
36	Thomas Walter Bickett	1909 – 1917	Democratic	
37	James S. Manning	1917 – 1925	Democratic	
38	Dennis G. Brummitt	1925 – 1935	Democratic	
39	Aaron A. F. Seawell	1935 – 1938	Democratic	
40	Harry McMullan	1938 – 1955	Democratic	
41	William B. Rodman Jr.	1955 – 1956	Democratic	
42	George B. Patton	1956 – 1958	Democratic	
43	Malcolm B. Seawell	1958 – 1960	Democratic	
44	T. Wade Bruton	1960 – 1969	Democratic	
45	Robert B. Morgan	1969 – 1974	Democratic	
46	James H. Carson Jr.	1974 – 1975	Republican	
47	Rufus L. Edmisten	1975 – 1985	Democratic	
48	Lacy Thornburg	1985 – 1993	Democratic	
49	Mike Easley	1993 – 2001	Democratic	
50	Roy Cooper	2001 – 2017	Democratic	
51	Josh Stein	2017 – 2025	Democratic	
52	Jeff Jackson	2025 – present	Democratic	

== Works cited ==
- Bledsoe, Margaret M. (September 1992). "The Advisory Opinion in North Carolina: 1947 to 1991". North Carolina Law Review. 70 (6): 1853–1898.
- Crawford, Wright W. (March 2024). "Private Equity Investment and the Corporate Practice of Medicine in North Carolina". North Carolina Banking Institute. 28 (1): 527–555.
- Eamon, Tom (2014). The Making of a Southern Democracy: North Carolina Politics from Kerr Scott to Pat McCrory. Chapel Hill: University of North Carolina Press. ISBN 9781469606972. - See profile at Google Books
- Fleer, Jack (2007). Governors Speak. University Press of America. ISBN 9780761835646.
- Guillory, Ferrel (June 1988). "The Council of State and North Carolina's Long Ballot : A Tradition Hard to Change" (PDF). N.C. Insight. N.C. Center for Public Policy Research. pp. 40–44.
- Harris, John E. (September 2014). "Holes in the Defense: Evaluating the North Carolina Attorney General's Duty to Defend and the Responses of Other Government Actors". North Carolina Law Review. 92 (6): 2027–2064.
- Mays, David John (2008). Sweeney, James R. (ed.). Race, Reason, and Massive Resistance: The Diary of David J. Mays, 1954-1959. University of Georgia Press. ISBN 9780820330259.
- North Carolina Manual. Raleigh: North Carolina Secretary of State. 2001. OCLC 436873840.
- North Carolina Manual (PDF). Raleigh: North Carolina Department of the Secretary of State. 2011. OCLC 2623953. Archived from the original (PDF) on 2023-08-02.
- Orth, John V.; Newby, Paul M. (2013). The North Carolina State Constitution (second ed.). Oxford University Press. ISBN 9780199300655.
- Orth, John V. (September 1992). "Tuesday, February 11, 1868: The Day North Carolina Chose Direct Election of Judges--A Transcript of the Debates from the 1868 Constitutional Convention". North Carolina Law Review. 70 (6): 1825–1851.
- Vick, Wesleigh C. (September 2018). "A Defense of the Defense: An Analysis of the North Carolina Attorney General's Legal Ability to Refuse to Defend State Laws". North Carolina Law Review. 96 (6): 1855–1881.
