= Aaron A. F. Seawell =

American judge (1864–1950)

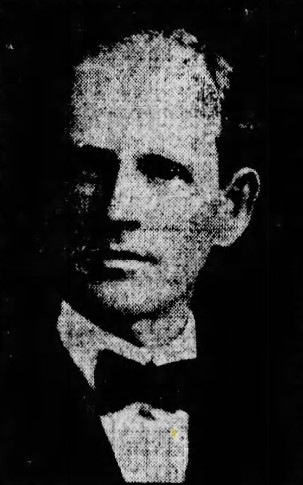
- Seawell in 1913

Representative of Moore and Lee County in the North Carolina General Assembly
- In office 1901–1931

39th North Carolina Attorney General
- In office 1938–1935
- Preceding: Dennis G. Brummitt
- Preceded by: Harry McMullan

Judge in the North Carolina Supreme Court
- In office 1938–1950

Personal details
- Born: 1864
- Died: 1950 (aged 85–86)
- Children: Malcolm Buie Seawell; Donald Seawell
- Education: University of North Carolina at Chapel Hill (1884)

Aaron Ashley Flowers Seawell (1864 – 1950) was an American politician and jurist. He served as Attorney General of North Carolina. He then served on the North Carolina Supreme Court.

== Biography ==
The son of Aaron Ashley Flowers Sr. (1822–1894) and Jeannette Ann (Buie) Seawell (1829-1907), he graduated from the University of North Carolina at Chapel Hill in 1884 and later studied law there.

He was elected to represent first Moore County and then Lee County in the North Carolina General Assembly for several noncontinuous terms from 1901 to 1931. He was appointed by governor Ehringhaus to succeed Dennis Garfield Brummitt as North Carolina Attorney General and was then elected to the office. He served from 1935 to 1938, when he was appointed to the North Carolina Supreme Court, where he served until his death in 1950.

== Legacy ==
His son, Malcolm Buie Seawell, followed in his footsteps as state Attorney General from 1958 to 1960. Another son, Donald Seawell, was an attorney, Broadway producer, and publisher of The Denver Post, before founding The Denver Center for the Performing Arts. Seawell Elementary School in Chapel Hill was named in honor of his daughter Elizabeth Seawell, who taught there for several decades. He was also the father of Sarah Jeanette Seawell Sommers Eddleman and Edward Harding Seawell, who graduated with honors from law school. Edward was aboard the USS Quincy on Aug. 9, 1942, when the Quincy was sunk, and 529 of her crew perished. Edward was among those missing in action and was awarded the Purple Heart.

Aaron's grandson, Buie Seawell, moved to Colorado and became chairman of the state Democratic Party.

== Additional sources ==
- Political Graveyard
- North Carolina Manual

Party political offices
Preceded by Dennis G. Brummitt	Democratic nominee for Attorney General of North Carolina; 1936	Succeeded by Harry McMullan
Legal offices
Preceded by Dennis G. Brummitt	Attorney General of North Carolina; 1935–1938	Succeeded by Harry McMullan
