= 2020 North Carolina Commissioner of Agriculture election =

- November 3, 2020
- Turnout: 75.35%
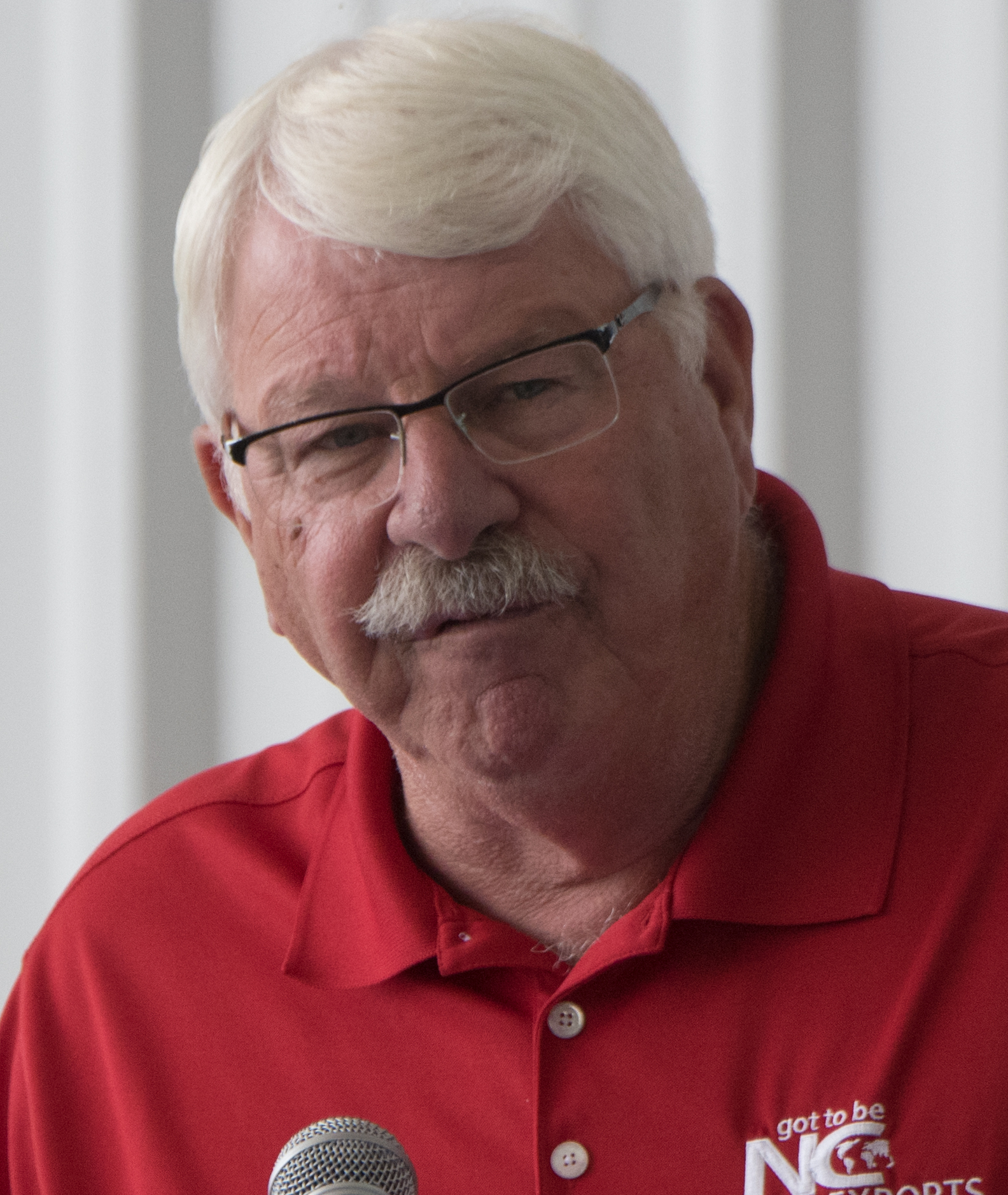

Candidate	Steve Troxler	Jenna Wadsworth
Party	Republican	Democratic
Popular vote	2,901,849	2,485,722
Percentage	53.86%	46.14%
- County results Troxler: 50–60% 60–70% 70–80% 80–90% Wadsworth: 50–60% 60–70% 70–80%
Commissioner of Agriculture before election
Steve Troxler
Republican
Elected Commissioner of Agriculture
Steve Troxler
Republican

The 2020 North Carolina Commissioner of Agriculture election was held on November 3, 2020, to elect the North Carolina Commissioner of Agriculture, concurrently with the 2020 presidential election, as well as elections to the United States Senate, U.S. House of Representatives, governor, the Council of State, and other state, local, and judicial elections.

Incumbent Republican agriculture commissioner Steve Troxler won re-election to a fourth full term in office, defeating Wake County Soil and Water Conservation board member Jenna Wadsworth.

== Republican primary ==
=== Candidates ===
==== Nominee ====
- Steve Troxler, incumbent agriculture commissioner (2005–present)

=== Results ===
Republican primary results
Party	Candidate	Votes	%
Republican	Steve Troxler (incumbent)	Unopposed	
Total votes		—N/a	100.0

== Democratic primary ==
=== Candidates ===
==== Nominee ====
- Jenna Wadsworth, member of the Wake County Soil and Water Conservation District Board

==== Eliminated in primary ====
- Walter Smith, former mayor of Boonville and nominee for agriculture commissioner in 2012 and 2016
- Donovan Alexander Watson, orchard owner

=== Endorsements ===
Jenna Wadsworth

Newspapers and other media

- The Charlotte Observer (Democratic primary only)
- The News & Observer (Democratic primary only)

=== Results ===
Results by county Wadsworth: 40–50%; 50–60%; 60–70%; 70–80%; Smith: 30–40%; 40–50%; 50–60%; 60–70%; 70–80%

Democratic primary results
Party	Candidate	Votes	%
Democratic	Jenna Wadsworth	609,910	54.01%
Democratic	Walter Smith	344,111	30.47%
Democratic	Donovan Alexander Watson	175,207	15.52%
Total votes		1,129,228	100.00%

== General election ==
=== Endorsements ===
Steve Troxler (R)

Newspapers and other media

- The Charlotte Observer
- The News & Observer
Jenna Wadsworth (D)

Newspapers and other media

- INDY Week

=== Predictions ===
Source	Ranking	As of
Elections Daily	Likely R	September 15, 2020

=== Polling ===
Poll source	Date(s) administered	Sample size (Note: Key: A – all adults RV – registered voters LV – likely voters V – unclear)	Margin of error	Steve Troxler (R)	Jenna Wadsworth (D)	Undecided
Meeting Street Insights (R) (Note: Poll sponsored by Carolina Partnership for Reform)	October 24–27, 2020	600 (LV)	± 4.0%	50%	42%	6%
Harper Polling/Civitas (R)	October 22–25, 2020	504 (LV)	± 4.37%	47%	44%	9%
Harper Polling/Civitas (R)	August 6–10, 2020	600 (LV)	± 4.0%	42%	34%	24%

=== Results ===
2020 North Carolina Commissioner of Agriculture election
Party	Candidate	Votes	%
Republican	Steve Troxler (incumbent)	2,901,849	53.86%
Democratic	Jenna Wadsworth	2,485,722	46.14%
Total votes		5,387,571	100.00%
Republican hold			
