= 2024 North Carolina Council of State elections =

2024 North Carolina Council of State election
- November 5, 2024

All 10 members of the North Carolina Council of State
	Majority party	Minority party
Party	Democratic	Republican
Last election	4	6
Seats won	5	5
Seat change	▲1	▼1
Popular vote	27,398,728 (Note: Popular vote figures represent the total amounts of Democratic and Republican votes)	27,390,299 (Note: Popular vote figures represent the total amounts of Democratic and Republican votes)
Percentage	49.34%	49.32%

Elections were held in North Carolina were held on November 5, 2024, to select the ten officers of the North Carolina Council of State. These elections coincided with the presidential election, elections to the House of Representatives, elections to the North Carolina General Assembly and top state courts. Primary elections took place on March 5, 2024, for offices for which more than one candidate filed per party.

The ten members of the North Carolina Council of State are statewide-elected officers serving four-year terms.

The November general election had mixed results for both parties. The Republican Party picked up the office of State Auditor while maintaining control of the offices of State Treasurer, Agriculture Commissioner, Labor Commissioner, and Insurance Commissioner. In contrast, the Democrats held the offices of Attorney General, Governor, and Secretary of State, while also flipping the offices of Lieutenant Governor and Superintendent of Public Instruction.

== Governor ==
The 2024 North Carolina gubernatorial election was held on November 5, 2024, to elect the governor of North Carolina. Democratic state attorney general Josh Stein won his first term in office, defeating Republican lieutenant governor Mark Robinson. He succeeded Democratic incumbent Roy Cooper, who was term-limited.

== Lieutenant governor ==
Incumbent Lt. Gov. Mark Robinson, a Republican, was eligible to run for a second term, but decided instead to run for governor. Democratic state senator Rachel Hunt won her first term in office, defeating Republican state official Hal Weatherman.

== Attorney general ==
The 2024 North Carolina Attorney General election was held on November 5, 2024, to elect the next attorney general of North Carolina. Democratic congressman Jeff Jackson defeated Republican congressman Dan Bishop in the contest to succeed Democratic incumbent Josh Stein, who did not seek re-election in order to run for governor. Republicans have not won a North Carolina attorney general election since 1896.

== Secretary of state ==
The 2024 North Carolina Secretary of State election was held on November 5, 2024, to elect the secretary of state of North Carolina, concurrently with the 2024 U.S. presidential election, as well as elections to the United States Senate, elections to the United States House of Representatives, and various other state and local elections. Incumbent Democratic Secretary of State Elaine Marshall won re-election to an eighth term in office, defeating Republican nominee Chad Brown. This was the only Democratic-held secretary of state held up for election in 2024 in a state Donald Trump won in 2020. Primary elections took place on March 5, 2024.

== State auditor ==
=== Results ===
2024 North Carolina State Auditor election
Party	Candidate	Votes	%	±%
Republican	Dave Boliek	2,729,780	49.35%	+0.23%
Democratic	Jessica Holmes (incumbent)	2,633,607	47.61%	−3.27%
Libertarian	Bob Drach	167,701	3.03%	N/A
Total votes		5,531,088	100.0%	
Republican gain from Democratic				

== State treasurer ==
Incumbent Republican Treasurer Dale Folwell was eligible to run for a third term, but decided instead to run for governor.

=== Results ===
2024 North Carolina State Treasurer election
Party	Candidate	Votes	%	±%
Republican	Brad Briner	2,900,059	52.45%	–0.13%
Democratic	Wesley Harris	2,629,444	47.55%	+0.13%
Total votes		5,529,503	100.0%	
Republican hold				

== Superintendent of Public Instruction ==
Incumbent Republican Superintendent Catherine Truitt ran for re-election to a second term in office, but was eliminated in the Republican primary. Democratic nominee Mo Green won the general election over Republican nominee Michele Morrow.

=== Results ===
2024 North Carolina Superintendent of Public Instruction election
Party	Candidate	Votes	%	±%
Democratic	Mo Green	2,837,606	51.18%	+2.56%
Republican	Michele Morrow	2,706,953	48.82%	–2.56%
Total votes		5,544,559	100.0%	
Democratic gain from Republican				

== Commissioner of Agriculture ==
2024 North Carolina Commissioner of Agriculture election
- November 5, 2024
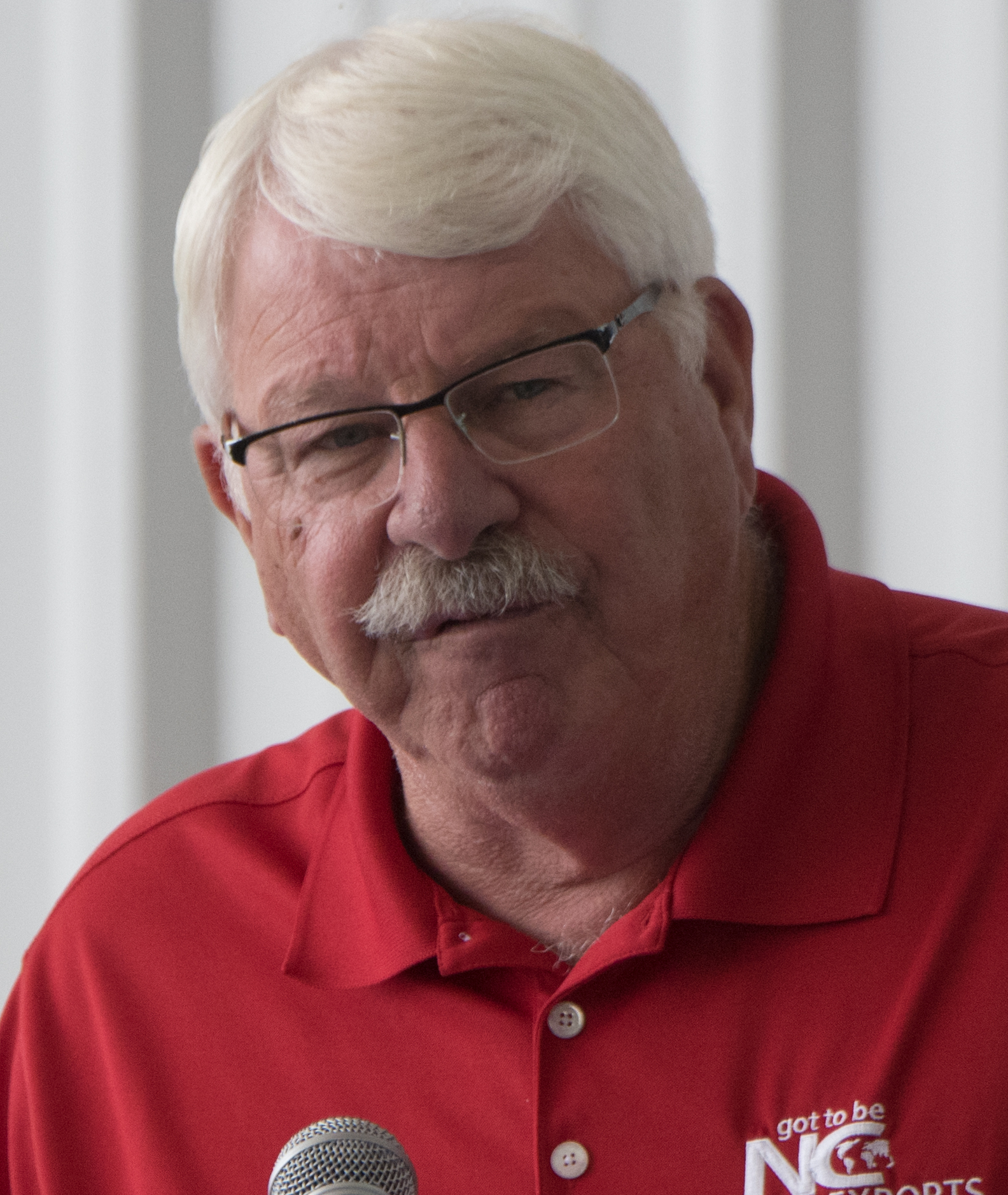

Nominee	Steve Troxler	Sarah Taber
Party	Republican	Democratic
Popular vote	2,922,483	2,496,474
Percentage	52.61%	44.95%
- Troxler: 40–50% 50–60% 60–70% 70–80% 80–90% Taber: 40–50% 50–60% 60–70% 70–80%
Commissioner of Agriculture before election
Steve Troxler
Republican
Elected Commissioner of Agriculture
Steve Troxler
Republican

Incumbent Republican Commissioner Steve Troxler ran for re-election to a sixth term in office.

=== Republican primary ===
==== Candidates ====
===== Nominee =====
- Steve Troxler, incumbent commissioner of agriculture

==== Eliminated in primary ====
- Colby (Bear) Hammonds, rancher

==== Results ====
Results by county Troxler: 50–60%; 60–70%; 70–80%; 80–90%; Hammonds: 50–60%

Republican primary results
Party	Candidate	Votes	%
Republican	Steve Troxler (incumbent)	644,720	69.10%
Republican	Bear Hammonds	288,347	30.90%
Total votes		933,067	100.0%

=== Democratic primary ===
==== Candidates ====
===== Nominee =====
- Sarah Taber, agricultural consultant

=== Libertarian primary ===
==== Candidates ====
===== Nominee =====
- Sean Haugh, former Libertarian Party national political director and perennial candidate

=== General election ===
==== Polling ====
Poll source	Date(s) administered	Sample size (Note: Key: A – all adults RV – registered voters LV – likely voters V – unclear)	Margin of error	Steve Troxler (R)	Sarah Taber (D)	Sean Haugh (L)	Undecided
ActiVote	October 8–26, 2024	400 (LV)	± 4.9%	53%	47%	–	–
Cygnal (R) (Note: Poll sponsored by the Carolina Journal)	October 12–14, 2024	600 (LV)	± 3.99%	45%	38%	2%	14%
ActiVote	August 20 – September 22, 2024	400 (LV)	± 4.9%	52%	48%	–	–
Cygnal (R)	September 15–16, 2024	600 (LV)	± 4.0%	41%	38%	2%	19%
YouGov (D) (Note: Poll sponsored by Carolina Forward)	August 5–9, 2024	802 (RV)	± 3.9%	43%	39%	–	20%

==== Results ====
2024 North Carolina Commissioner of Agriculture election
Party	Candidate	Votes	%	±%
Republican	Steve Troxler (incumbent)	2,922,483	52.61%	–1.25%
Democratic	Sarah Taber	2,496,474	44.95%	–1.19%
Libertarian	Sean Haugh	135,513	2.44%	N/A
Total votes		5,554,470	100.0%	
Republican hold				

== Commissioner of Labor ==
2024 North Carolina Commissioner of Labor election
- November 5, 2024
Nominee	Luke Farley	Braxton Winston II
Party	Republican	Democratic
Popular vote	2,904,331	2,601,255
Percentage	52.75%	47.25%
- Farley: 50–60% 60–70% 70–80% 80–90% Winston: 50–60% 60–70% 70–80%
Commissioner of Labor before election
Josh Dobson
Republican
Elected Commissioner of Labor
Luke Farley
Republican

Incumbent Republican Commissioner Josh Dobson did not run for re-election to a second term in office.

=== Republican primary ===
==== Candidates ====
===== Nominee =====
- Luke Farley, attorney

==== Eliminated in primary ====
- Jon Hardister, state representative
- Chuck Stanley, construction manager and candidate for commissioner of labor in 2020
- Travis Wilson, grocery stocker

===== Withdrawn =====
- Ben Moss, state representative

===== Declined =====
- Josh Dobson, incumbent commissioner of labor (endorsed Hardister)

==== Endorsements ====
Luke Farley

Statewide officials

- Cherie Berry, former commissioner of labor (2001–2021)
Jon Hardister

Statewide officials

- Josh Dobson, incumbent commissioner of labor

==== Polling ====
Hypothetical polling

Poll source	Date(s) administered	Sample size	Margin of error	Jon Hardister	Ben Moss	Undecided
SurveyUSA (Note: Poll sponsored by the John Locke Foundation)	April 25–29, 2023	707 (LV)	± 4.0%	16%	12%	72%

==== Results ====
Results by county Farley: 20–30%; 30–40%; 40–50%; 50–60%; Hardister: 30–40%; 40–50%; 50–60%; 60–70%; Stanley: 30–40%; 60–70%

Republican primary results
Party	Candidate	Votes	%
Republican	Luke Farley	315,490	36.94%
Republican	Jon Hardister	239,551	28.05%
Republican	Chuck Stanley	184,458	21.60%
Republican	Travis Wilson	114,563	13.41%
Total votes		854,062	100.0%

=== Democratic primary ===
==== Candidates ====
===== Nominee =====
- Braxton Winston II, former at-large Charlotte city councilor

=== General election ===
==== Polling ====
Poll source	Date(s) administered	Sample size	Margin of error	Luke Farley (R)	Braxton Winston II (D)	Undecided
ActiVote	October 8–26, 2024	400 (LV)	± 4.9%	52%	48%	–
Cygnal (R)	October 12–14, 2024	600 (LV)	± 3.99%	44%	42%	15%
ActiVote	August 20 – September 22, 2024	400 (LV)	± 4.9%	49%	51%	–
Cygnal (R)	September 15–16, 2024	600 (LV)	± 4.0%	41%	41%	18%
YouGov (D)	August 5–9, 2024	802 (RV)	± 3.9%	40%	40%	20%
Cygnal (R)	August 4–5, 2024	600 (LV)	± 4.0%	40%	36%	25%
Cygnal (R)	March 6–7, 2024	600 (LV)	± 4.0%	42%	35%	23%

==== Results ====
2024 North Carolina Commissioner of Labor election
Party	Candidate	Votes	%	±%
Republican	Luke Farley	2,904,331	52.75%	+1.92%
Democratic	Braxton Winston II	2,601,255	47.25%	–1.92%
Total votes		5,505,586	100.0%	
Republican hold				

== Commissioner of Insurance ==
Incumbent Republican Commissioner Mike Causey ran for re-election to a third term in office.

=== Results ===
2024 North Carolina Commissioner of Insurance election
Party	Candidate	Votes	%	±%
Republican	Mike Causey (incumbent)	2,883,996	52.12%	+0.36%
Democratic	Natasha Marcus	2,649,353	47.88%	–0.36%
Total votes		5,533,349	100.0%	
Republican hold				

== See also ==
- 2024 North Carolina elections

== Notes ==
Partisan clients
