= 1948 North Carolina lieutenant gubernatorial election =

- November 2, 1948
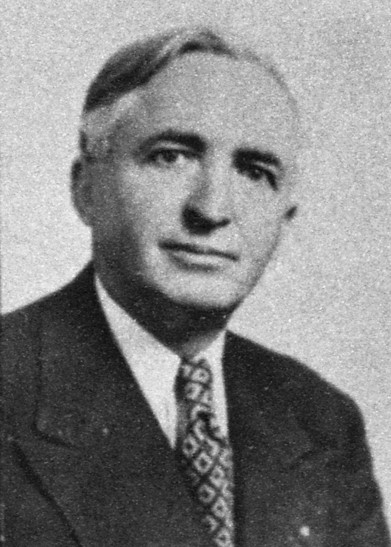

Nominee	Hoyt Patrick Taylor	R. Kyle Hayes
Party	Democratic	Republican
Popular vote	544,560	206,511
Percentage	72.18%	27.37%
Lieutenant Governor before election
Lynton Y. Ballentine
Democratic
Elected Lieutenant Governor
Hoyt Patrick Taylor
Democratic

The 1948 North Carolina lieutenant gubernatorial election was held on November 2, 1948. Democratic nominee Hoyt Patrick Taylor defeated Republican nominee R. Kyle Hayes with 72.18% of the vote.

== Primary elections ==
Primary elections were held on May 29, 1948.

=== Democratic primary ===
==== Candidates ====
- Hoyt Patrick Taylor, former State Senator
- Daniel L. Tompkins, unsuccessful candidate for nomination for Lieutenant Governor in 1940

==== Results ====
Democratic primary results
Party	Candidate	Votes	%
Democratic	Hoyt Patrick Taylor	240,663	70.62
Democratic	Daniel L. Tompkins	100,101	29.38
Total votes		340,764	

== General election ==
=== Candidates ===
Major party candidates

- R. Kyle Hayes, Republican
- Hoyt P. Taylor, Democratic

Other candidates

- A. Kenneth Harris, Progressive

=== Results ===
1948 North Carolina lieutenant gubernatorial election
Party	Candidate	Votes	%	±%
Democratic	Hoyt Patrick Taylor	544,560	72.18%	
Republican	R. Kyle Hayes	206,511	27.37%	
Progressive	A. Kenneth Harris	3,368	0.45%	
Majority		338,049	44.81%	
Turnout		754,439		
Democratic hold		Swing		

== Bibliography ==
- North Carolina Manual 1949. 1916.
