= 1944 North Carolina lieutenant gubernatorial election =

- November 7, 1944

Nominee	Lynton Y. Ballentine	George L. Greene
Party	Democratic	Republican
Popular vote	520,850	227,430
Percentage	69.61%	30.39%
Lieutenant Governor before election
Reginald L. Harris
Democratic
Elected Lieutenant Governor
Lynton Y. Ballentine
Democratic

The 1944 North Carolina lieutenant gubernatorial election was held on November 7, 1944. Democratic nominee Lynton Y. Ballentine defeated Republican nominee George L. Greene with 69.61% of the vote.

== Primary elections ==
Primary elections were held on May 27, 1944.

=== Democratic primary ===
==== Candidates ====
- Lynton Y. Ballentine, former State Senator
- William I. Halstead, State Senator
- Jamie T. Lyda

==== Results ====
Democratic primary results
Party	Candidate	Votes	%
Democratic	Lynton Y. Ballentine	181,002	69.83
Democratic	William I. Halstead	59,246	22.86
Democratic	Jamie T. Lyda	18,940	7.31
Total votes		259,188	100.00

=== Republican primary ===
==== Candidates ====
- George L. Greene
- A. Harold Morgan
- Robert L. Lovelace

==== Results ====
Republican primary results
Party	Candidate	Votes	%
Republican	George L. Greene	3,796	51.67
Republican	A. Harold Morgan	1,896	25.81
Republican	Robert L. Lovelace	1,654	22.52
Total votes		7,346	100.00

== General election ==
=== Candidates ===
- Lynton Y. Ballentine, Democratic
- George L. Greene, Republican

=== Results ===
1944 North Carolina lieutenant gubernatorial election
Party	Candidate	Votes	%	±%
Democratic	Lynton Y. Ballentine	520,850	69.61%	
Republican	George L. Greene	227,430	30.39%	
Majority		293,420		
Turnout				
Democratic hold		Swing		
