= Hoyt Taylor =

Hoyt Taylor may refer to:

- Hoyt Patrick Taylor (1890–1964), Lieutenant Governor of North Carolina
- Hoyt Patrick Taylor Jr. (1924–2018), known as "Pat" Taylor, his son
- Albert H. Taylor (1879–1961), American electrical engineer; radar developer
- Frank Hoyt Taylor (born 1953), American actor
