= North Carolina Republican Party =

North Carolina affiliate of the Republican Party

- Chairperson: Jason Simmons
- Senate President (pro tempore): Phil Berger
- House Speaker: Destin Hall
- Founded: 1867; 159 years ago
- Headquarters: 1506 Hillsborough St, Raleigh, NC 27605
- Student wing: North Carolina Federation of College Republicans
- Youth wing: North Carolina Federation of Young Republicans; North Carolina Teenage Republicans
- Membership (2025): ▲2,325,833
- Ideology: Conservatism
- National affiliation: Republican Party
- Colors: Red
- Council of State: 5 / 10
- Seats in the North Carolina Senate: 30 / 50
- Seats in the North Carolina House of Representatives: 71 / 120
- U.S. Senate: 2 / 2
- U.S. House of Representatives: 10 / 14
- State Supreme Court: 5 / 7

Election symbol

Website
- www.nc.gop

The North Carolina Republican Party (NCRP) is the affiliate of the Republican Party in North Carolina. It is currently the state's dominant party, controlling 10 of North Carolina's 14 U.S. House seats, both U.S. Senate seats, majorities in both of its state legislative chambers (3/5 supermajority in the North Carolina Senate), and a majority on the state supreme court.

The party was established in 1867, in the aftermath of the American Civil War. Gaining support from the newly enfranchised freedmen, Republicans were briefly successful in state politics, dominating the convention that wrote the Constitution of North Carolina of 1868 and electing several governors. After Reconstruction, Democrats returned to power, often suppressing the black vote by violence and electoral fraud. Republicans had success in the 1890s when they joined forces with the Populist party in an "electoral fusion." They gained enough seats in the legislature to control it in 1896, and elected Daniel L. Russell as governor in 1896.

== History ==
=== Nineteenth century ===
Although Republicans first nominated a candidate for President of the United States, John C. Fremont, in 1856, the party was not established in North Carolina until 1867, after the American Civil War. With the help of the newly enfranchised freedmen, Republicans were briefly successful in state politics, dominating the convention that wrote the Constitution of North Carolina of 1868 and electing several governors. After Reconstruction, Democrats returned to power, often suppressing the black vote by violence and fraud. Republicans had success in the 1890s when they joined forces with the Populist party in an "electoral fusion." They gained enough seats in the legislature to control it in 1896, and elected Daniel L. Russell as governor in 1896.

=== Twentieth century ===
To prevent this kind of challenge, after Democrats regained control of the state legislature, in 1900 they adopted a constitutional suffrage amendment which required prepayment of a poll tax and an educational qualification (to be assessed by a registrar, which meant that it could be subjectively applied), and lengthened the residence period required before registration. A grandfather clause exempted from the poll tax those entitled to vote on January 1, 1867, which limited exemptions to white men. These barriers to voter registration caused a dramatic drop in the number of African-American voters in the state by 1904, although they constituted one-third of the population. An estimated 75,000 black male citizens lost the vote.

With North Carolina a one-party Democratic state of the Solid South following the disfranchisement of blacks, North Carolina Republicans struggled to survive as a party during the first half of the twentieth century. African Americans were virtually excluded from the political system in the state until the late 1960s. In 1928, Republicans carried the state's electoral votes for president (for candidate Herbert Hoover). White members of the Republican Party generally lived in the Piedmont near Charlotte and Winston-Salem, and the mountains in the western part of the state. In 1952, Charles R. Jonas was elected to Congress from the western part of the state as the first Republican since before the Great Depression. He was joined in 1962 by Jim Broyhill. From this base, and nearly winning the electoral votes for the state in the Presidential elections from 1952 to 1960, the party began to grow.

As in other southern states, in the late 20th century, white conservatives began to shift from the Democratic Party to the Republican one, especially after national Democratic leaders supported the Civil Rights Act of 1964 and the Voting Rights Act of 1965. White conservatives first voted for Republican presidential candidates. From 1968 through 2004, the majority of North Carolina voters supported Republicans in every presidential election, except 1976, when favorite son Democrat Jimmy Carter was elected from Georgia. When they re-entered the political system, African Americans shifted their alliance from the Republican to the Democratic Party, which had national leaders who had supported the civil rights effort and legislation enforcing their constitutional rights as citizens.

In 1972, Republicans became competitive in statewide elections for the first time since 1900: James Holshouser was elected Governor of the state, and Jesse Helms, a former Democrat who held office for a long time, was elected to the U.S. Senate. Jack Lee, who was elected state party chairperson in 1977, is widely credited with unifying the North Carolina Republican Party in this period.

The parties were generally competitive, with the state's voters split between them, through much of the rest of the 20th century.

=== Twenty-first century ===
The elections of 2010 led to Republican control of both houses of the North Carolina General Assembly for the first time since 1896 when it had gained success in a fusionist campaign with the Populist Party.

When the Republican-controlled legislature conducted redistricting in 2011, it established districts biased in favor of Republicans. As a result, although more voters chose Democratic congressional candidates in the state in 2012, Republicans won a majority of the seats. The district maps have been challenged in several lawsuits for racial gerrymandering, and the maps were struck down by a state court in 2019.

In 2012, Republicans retained control of the legislature and elected two Republicans, Pat McCrory and Dan Forest, as Governor and Lieutenant Governor, respectively. Most of the other Council of State offices (the Governor and Lieutenant Governor are Chairman and Vice Chairman, respectively) were won by Democratic candidates. (The other Republicans are Cherie K. Berry, Commissioner of Labor and Steve Troxler, Commissioner of Agriculture.)

In February 2021, the North Carolina Republican Party censured Senator Richard Burr after he voted to impeach Donald Trump for his role in inciting a pro-Trump mob to storm the U.S. Capitol. The next month, the party did not censure House Representative Madison Cawthorn amid numerous accusations of sexual harassment, as well as exposure of false and baseless claims that he had made about himself.

2025 congressional redistricting

In November 2025, Republican legislature in the North Carolina General Assembly redrew its congressional maps in response to the redistricting battles in Texas and California. It was being held up in court but was unanimously upheld at the U.S. District Court gaining another Republican seat.

== Party platform ==
In 2016, North Carolina Republicans passed laws to order transgender people to use bathrooms according to their sex assigned at birth. On March 23, 2016, Governor McCrory signed the Public Facilities Privacy & Security Act (commonly known as House Bill 2 or HB2), described at the time as the most anti-LGBT legislation in the United States. It eliminated anti-discrimination protections for gay, transgender, and intersex people and forbids cities to re-establish such protections. It also required people who enter government buildings to use only the restrooms that correspond to the sex on their birth certificates. While some transgender people alter the gender marker on their birth certificates, others have not yet done so or cannot do so, and this law would have prevented them from using the restroom consistent with the gender identity in which they live. However, on March 30, 2017, the portion of the law regarding bathroom use was repealed, and a sunset provision of December 1, 2020 was applied to the ban on local governments passing antidiscrimination laws.

At the state party's annual convention in June 2023, delegates voted to censure U.S. Senator Thom Tillis for his support of same-sex marriage. The North Carolina Republican party platform opposes same-sex marriage.

In June 2025, the state party adopted an updated party platform reaffirming their values and ideals.

== Current elected officials ==
The party has maintain power in the state since the 2010 election, controlling five of the ten statewide Council of State offices and a majority in the North Carolina House of Representatives and in the North Carolina Senate. Republicans also hold both of the state's U.S. Senate seats and 10 of the state's 14 U.S. House seats.

=== Members of Congress ===
==== U.S. Senate ====
Republicans have controlled both of North Carolina's seats in the U.S. Senate since 2014:

- Class II: Thom Tillis (senior senator)
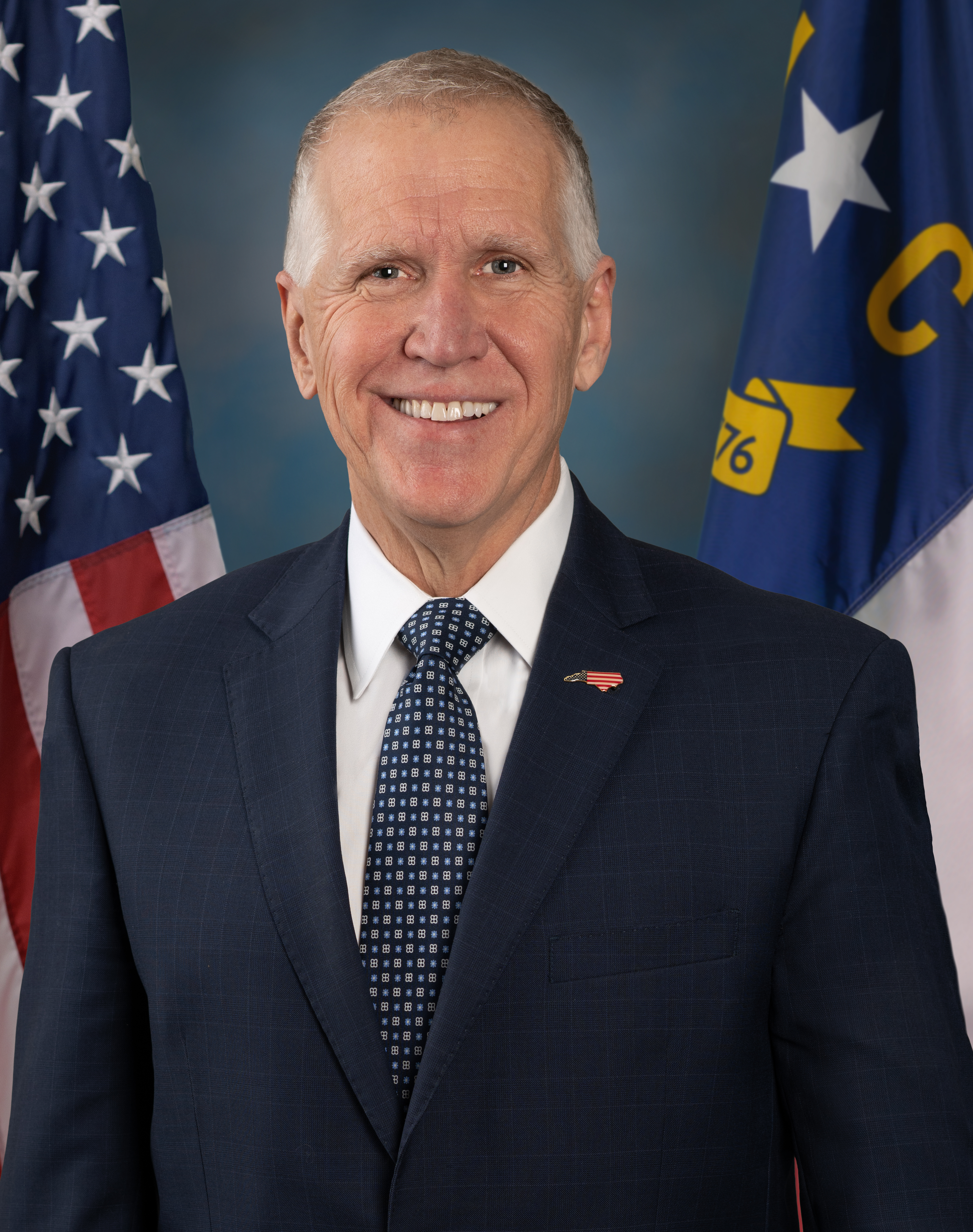
  Senior Senator Tillis
- Class III: Ted Budd (junior senator)
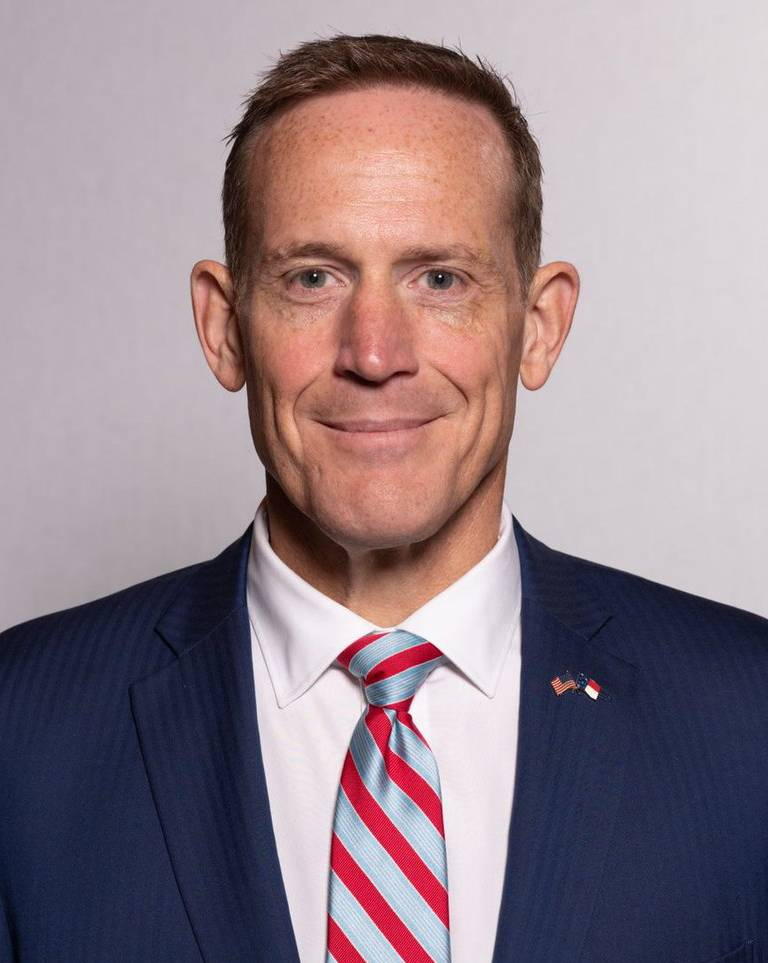
  Junior Senator Budd

==== U.S. House of Representatives ====
Republicans hold 10 out of the 14 seats in North Carolina apportioned in the U.S. House of Representatives:

District	Member	Photo
3rd	Greg Murphy	
5th	Virginia Foxx	
6th	Addison McDowell	
7th	David Rouzer	
8th	Mark Harris	
9th	Richard Hudson	
10th	Pat Harrigan	
11th	Chuck Edwards	
13th	Brad Knott	
14th	Tim Moore	

=== Statewide offices ===
Republicans control five of the 10 elected statewide Council of State offices:

- Auditor: Dave Boliek
- Commissioner of Agriculture: Steve Troxler
- Commissioner of Insurance: Mike Causey
- Commissioner of Labor: Luke Farley
- Treasurer: Brad Briner

=== North Carolina General Assembly ===
- Senate President Pro Tempore: Phil Berger
  - Senate Majority Leader: Michael V. Lee
- Speaker of the House: Destin Hall
  - Speaker Pro Tempore: Mitchell S. Setzer
  - House Majority Leader: Brenden Jones

== List of Chairs ==
- Alfred E. Holton (1894–1897)
- Spencer B. Adams (1906–1910)
- John Motley Morehead II (1910–1916)
- Frank A. Linney (1913–1921)
- William G. Bramham (1920–1924)
- James S. Duncan (1930–1934)
- William C. Meekins (1934–1938)
- Sim A. DeLapp (1942–1950)
- James M. Baley Jr. (1951–1953)
- William E. Cobb (1958–1962)
- Robert L. Gavin (1962–1963)
- J. Herman Saxon (1964–1965)
- Jim Gardner (1965–1966)
- James Holshouser (1966–1971)
- Frank Rouse (1971–1974)
- Jack Lee (1977–1981)
- Jack Hawke (1987–1995)
- Sam Currin (1996–1999)
- Bill Cobey (1999–2003)
- Ferrell Blount (2003–2006)
- Linda Daves (2007–2009)
- Tom Fetzer (2009–2011)
- Robin Hayes (2011–2013)
- Claude Pope (2013–2015)
- Hassan Harnett (2015-2016)
- Robin Hayes (2016–2019)
- Michael Whatley (2019–2024)
- Jason Simmons (2024–Present)

== See also ==
- North Carolina Democratic Party
- North Carolina Libertarian Party
- North Carolina Green Party
