= James M. Mewborne =

American farmer and politician

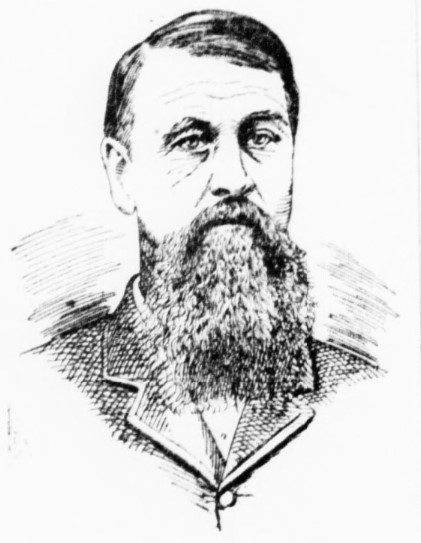
- Mewborne c. 1894

5th North Carolina Commissioner of Agriculture
- In office June 15, 1897 – January 1, 1898
- Appointed by: State Board of Agriculture
- Preceded by: Samuel L. Patterson
- Succeeded by: John R. Smith

Personal details
- Born: March 22, 1848 Vance Township, Lenoir County, North Carolina, U.S.
- Died: October 28, 1924 (aged 76) Kinston, North Carolina, U.S.
- Party: Populist

James Marion Mewborne (March 22, 1848 – October 28, 1924) was an American farmer and politician who served as North Carolina Commissioner of Agriculture from 1897 to 1898.

== Early life ==
James Marion Mewborne was born in Vance Township, Lenoir County, North Carolina on March 22, 1848, to Levi and Susan Parrott Mewborne.

Mewborne was active in the North Carolina chapter of the Farmers' Alliance. In 1889, he became the business agent for the Alliance's Lenoir County chapter and was elected to the organization's state executive committee. He served as president of the state Alliance from 1893 to 1895.

== Political career ==
Mewborne was initially a member of the Democratic Party. In 1890, he ran for the U.S. House of Representatives seat in North Carolina's 2nd congressional district as a Democrat with the support of the Farmers' Alliance after the initial Democratic nominee withdrew due to illness. Weakened by his late entry into the contest and doubts among Democrats about his loyalty to their party, he lost to Republican incumbent Henry P. Cheatham.

Mewborne joined the Populist Party in 1892. He attended the party's first state convention that year. After party chairman Harry Skinner withdrew his candidacy for the party's gubernatorial nomination, Mewborne offered himself as a candidate. In the first round of balloting he lost to Wyatt P. Exum, garnering only 220 delegates' votes to Exum's 263. He served in the North Carolina Senate in 1895 while the Fusionists, a coalition of Populists and Republicans, dominated the North Carolina General Assembly. With the backing of Skinner, he sought the Populist nomination for a lieutenant gubernatorial candidacy in 1896 but was defeated in a vote at the party's state convention by Oliver H. Dockery.

On March 23, 1897, the State Board of Agriculture elected Mewborne to serve as North Carolina Commissioner of Agriculture. He took office on June 15, 1897. During his tenure he failed to file certain reports on his department's activities as required by law, causing some public controversy. Governor Daniel Lindsay Russell uncovered evidence of malfeasance by Superintendent of the State Penitentiary John R. Smith later that year. To resolve the issue, he arranged for Smith to switch jobs with Mewborne. Mewborne tendered his resignation with the Board of Agriculture effective January 1, 1898, and the board passed a resolution thanking him for his service. He then served as Superintendent of the State Penitentiary for a year until the Fusionists lost power. Following the collapse of the Populist Party, Mewborne became a Republican and for several years chaired the party's Lenoir County chapter.

== Later life ==
Mewborne spent much of his later life focused on farming, though he direct collection efforts for the 1910 United States census in North Carolina's 2nd congressional district. He died on October 28, 1924, in Kinston and was buried in the city's Maplewood Cemetery.

== Works cited ==
- Beeby, James M. (2008). Revolt of the Tar Heels: The North Carolina Populist Movement, 1890-1901. University Press of Mississippi. ISBN 9781604733242.
- Graham, Jim (1998). The Sodfather: A Friend of Agriculture (PDF). Raleigh: James A. Graham Scholarship Endowment. ISBN 9780963455925.
- Hunt, James L. (2003). Marion Butler and American Populism. Chapel Hill: University of North Carolina Press. ISBN 9780807862506.
- Powell, William S. (2010). North Carolina Through Four Centuries (reprint ed.). Chapel Hill: UNC Press. ISBN 9780807898987.
- Ragsdale, Bruce A.; Treese, Joel D. (1990). Black Americans in Congress, 1870-1989. Washington D.C.: U.S. Government Printing Office.

Party political offices
First	Republican nominee for North Carolina Commissioner of Agriculture; 1900	Succeeded by W.R. Dixon
First	Populist nominee for North Carolina Commissioner of Agriculture; 1900	Succeeded by none
Preceded by W.R. Dixon	Republican nominee for North Carolina Commissioner of Agriculture; 1908	Succeeded by Alfred L. French
