= 2004 North Carolina Council of State election =

- November 2, 2004

All 10 members of the North Carolina Council of State
	Majority party	Minority party
Party	Democratic	Republican
Last election	9	1
Seats won	7	3
Seat change	▼2	▲2

Elections to choose members of the North Carolina Council of State (who head executive branch departments) were held on Tuesday, November 2, 2004. The U.S. Presidential election, U.S. House election, U.S. Senate election, the North Carolina General Assembly election, and North Carolina judicial elections were all held on the same day.

In all but two races (Superintendent of Public Instruction and Labor Commissioner), incumbents Democrats sought re-election and Democrats held both. However, two Democratic incumbents lost for Auditor and Agriculture Commissioner.

== Governor ==
The general election was between the Democratic incumbent Mike Easley and the Republican nominee Patrick J. Ballantine. Easley won by 56% to 43%, winning his second term as governor.

== Lieutenant Governor ==
2004 North Carolina lieutenant governor election
Party	Candidate	Votes	%	±%
Democratic	Bev Perdue (incumbent)	1,888,397	55.57	
Republican	Jim Snyder	1,453,705	42.78	
Libertarian	Chris Cole	56,368	1.66	
Turnout		3,398,470		
Democratic hold		Swing		

The 2004 North Carolina lieutenant governor election was held on November 2, 2004, as part of the elections to the Council of State. North Carolina also held a gubernatorial election on the same day, but the offices of Governor and Lieutenant Governor are elected independently. Incumbent Bev Perdue was re-elected with 55% of the vote.

== Secretary of State ==
2004 North Carolina Secretary of State election
Party	Candidate	Votes	%	±%
Democratic	Elaine Marshall (incumbent)	1,911,585	57.32	+2.89
Republican	Jay Rao	1,423,109	42.68	–2.89
Turnout		3,206,847		

Incumbent Democratic Secretary of State Elaine Marshall defeated both a primary challenge from Doris A. Sanders and from Republican challenger Jay Rao.

Results by county Marshall: 50–60%; 60–70%; 70–80%; 80–90%; Rao: 50–60%; 60–70%

== State Auditor ==
2004 North Carolina State Auditor election
Party	Candidate	Votes	%	±%
Republican	Les Merritt	1,662,354	50.44	+0.95
Democratic	Ralph Campbell (incumbent)	1,633,639	49.56	–0.95
Turnout		3,292,587		

Les Merritt, a former Wake County commissioner, and 2000 candidate, narrowly defeated 3-term incumbent State Auditor Ralph Campbell.

Results by county Merritt: 50–60%; 60–70%; 70–80%; Campbell: 50–60%; 60–70%; 70–80%

== Attorney General ==
2004 North Carolina Attorney General election
Party	Candidate	Votes	%	±%
Democratic	Roy Cooper (incumbent)	1,872,097	55.61	+4.40
Republican	Joe Knott	1,494,121	44.39	–2.01
Turnout		3,366,218		

North Carolina's incumbent Attorney General, Roy Cooper, defeated Republican challenger Joe Knott.

Results by county Cooper: 50–60%; 60–70%; 70–80%; 80–90%; Knott: 50–60%; 60–70%

== State Treasurer ==
2004 North Carolina State Treasurer election
Party	Candidate	Votes	%	±%
Democratic	Richard H. Moore (incumbent)	1,812,201	54.51	–0.84
Republican	Edward Meyer	1,512,619	45.49	+0.84
Turnout		3,324,820		

Incumbent State Treasurer Richard H. Moore defeated Republican challenger Edward Meyer by an eight-point margin.

Results by county Moore: 50–60%; 60–70%; 70–80%; 80–90%; Meyer: 50–60%; 60–70%

== Superintendent of Public Instruction ==
=== Results of November 2, 2004 ===
2004 North Carolina Superintendent of Public Instruction election – Popular vote
Party	Candidate	Votes	%	±%
Democratic	June Atkinson	1,655,719	50.13	–3.23
Republican	Bill Fletcher	1,647,184	49.87	+3.23
Turnout		3,302,903		

Results by county Atkinson: 50–60%; 60–70%; 70–80%; Fletcher: 50–60%; 60–70%; 70–80%

=== General Assembly vote of August 24, 2005 ===
2004 North Carolina Superintendent of Public Instruction election – General Assembly
Party	Candidate	Votes	%	±%
Democratic	June Atkinson	93	54.7	
Republican	Bill Fletcher	21	12.4	
	Undecided	26	15.3	
Turnout		140	82.35	

With the resignation of Mike Ward, the Superintendent of Public Instruction race was the only 2004 Council of State contest in which there was no incumbent; consequently both major parties saw contested primaries. On the Republican side, former Wake County board of education member Bill Fletcher easily bested retired professor Jeanne Smoot. The Democratic primary between state Department of Instruction official June Atkinson, North Carolina Board of Education member J. B. Buxton and state agricultural education coordinator Marshall Stewart led to a second primary. Stewart polled narrowly ahead of Atkinson in the first primary, but failed to capture the 40% support needed to take the nomination. In a statewide runoff primary, Atkinson captured the Democratic nomination.

The race, along with the race for Agriculture Commissioner (see below) was caught up for nearly a month in a statewide recount because of the narrow margin. Fletcher argued that provisional ballots, required under the Help America Vote Act of 2002 for federal races, were improperly counted in state races under North Carolina law. However, on 30 November 2004, the State Board of Elections certified Atkinson the winner. Fletcher appealed the recision to the North Carolina Supreme Court. Atkinson, in turn, petitioned the North Carolina General Assembly to resolve the disputed election. On August 24, 2005, the General Assembly met in a joint session to vote on the disputed election, as the state constitution called for. Atkinson won this vote and was sworn in that afternoon.

The election of the Superintendent of Public Instruction was the last American election from 2004 to be decided.

== North Carolina Commissioner of Agriculture ==
2004 North Carolina Commissioner of Agriculture election
Party	Candidate	Votes	%	±%
Republican	Steve Troxler	1,666,197	50.03	+0.60
Democratic	Britt Cobb (incumbent)	1,663,910	49.97	–0.60
Turnout		3,330,107		

Interim Agriculture Commissioner Britt Cobb defeated former state representative Tom Gilmore to take the Democratic nomination; Steve Troxler, the 2000 candidate for this position, was unopposed for the Republican nomination.

Due to the loss of about 4,000 votes in Carteret County, North Carolina, the race for State Agriculture Commissioner could not be resolved for several months. Although the North Carolina Board of Elections certified the close race for State Superintendent of Public Instruction on 30 November 2004, they reached an impasse on the Agriculture Commissioner Race, splitting 3–2 in favor of calling a new statewide election for the seat over calling a new election in Carteret County alone; 4 votes would have been required to take action on either option.

In early December, the North Carolina Board of Elections ordered a new election for January 11, 2005, in Carteret County alone, for voters whose ballots had been lost or who had not voted in the November 2 election. Both candidates appealed the decision, Cobb arguing that a statewide revote should be held, Troxler arguing that a revote should be limited to those voters whose votes were lost. A Wake County superior court judge overturned this decision on December 17, calling it "arbitrary and capricious" and "contrary to law", requiring the State Board of Elections to revisit the issue.

On December 29, the State Board of Elections ordered a new statewide election for the post. On January 13, 2005, the superior court invalidated this order as well, and sent the contest back to the Elections Board for resolution. Following this ruling, Cobb conceded defeat. On February 4, the State Board of Elections officially certified Troxler as the winner of the 2004 election.

Results by county Troxler: 50–60%; 60–70%; 70–80%; Cobb: 50–60%; 60–70%; 70–80%

== Commissioner of Labor ==
2004 North Carolina Commissioner of Labor election
Party	Candidate	Votes	%	±%
Republican	Cherie Berry (incumbent)	1,723,004	52.09	+1.96
Democratic	Wayne Goodwin	1,584,488	47.91	–1.96
Turnout		3,307,492		

Incumbent Cherie Berry, the only sitting Republican on the Council of State, defeated both a primary challenge from Lloyd T. Funderburg and a general election challenge from state representative Wayne Goodwin.

Results by county Berry: 50–60%; 60–70%; 70–80%; Goodwin: 50–60%; 60–70%; 70–80%

== State Insurance Commissioner ==
2004 North Carolina Commissioner of Insurance election
Party	Candidate	Votes	%	±%
Democratic	James E. Long (incumbent)	1,934,076	57.64	+1.10
Republican	C. Robert Brawley	1,421,398	42.36	–1.10
Turnout		3,355,474		

Five-term incumbent Jim Long defeated a challenge from Republican C. Robert Brawley to win the greatest number of votes for any candidate in the 2004 Council of State elections.

Results by county Long: 50–60%; 60–70%; 70–80%; 80–90%; Brawley: 50–60%; 60–70%
