= Samuel L. Patterson =

American politician

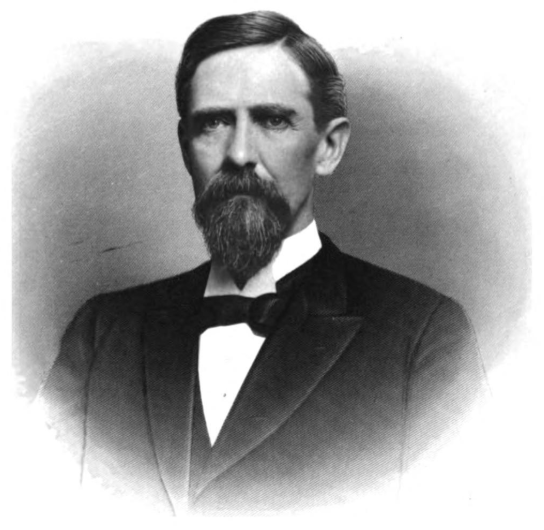

7th North Carolina Commissioner of Agriculture
- In office 1899–1908
- Appointed by: State Board of Agriculture
- Governor: Daniel L. Russell; Charles B. Aycock; Robert B. Glenn
- Preceded by: John R. Smith
- Succeeded by: William A. Graham

4th North Carolina Commissioner of Agriculture
- In office 1895–1897
- Governor: Elias Carr
- Preceded by: John Robinson
- Succeeded by: James M. Mewborne

Member of the North Carolina State Senate
- In office 1893–1893

Member of the North Carolina House of Representatives
- In office 1899–1900

Member of the North Carolina House of Representatives
- In office 1891–1891

Personal details
- Born: Samuel Legerwood Patterson; March 6, 1850 Caldwell County, North Carolina, U.S.
- Died: September 14, 1908 (aged 58) Caldwell County, North Carolina, U.S.

Samuel Legerwood Patterson (March 6, 1850 – September 14, 1908) was a North Carolina politician and farmer.

== Biography ==
The son of Samuel F. Patterson and his wife, Phoebe Caroline, Patterson was born in 1850 at Palmyra, the family plantation in Caldwell County, North Carolina.

He served in the state House of Representatives in 1891 and 1899 and in the North Carolina Senate in 1893. In the legislature, he was chair of the committee on agriculture. He was also a trustee of the University of North Carolina at Chapel Hill. Patterson was appointed commissioner of agriculture from 1895 to 1897, when he was removed by the fusion of Republicans and Populists that came to power that year. He was reappointed in 1899 and then became the first popularly elected commissioner in 1900. He served until his death on September 14, 1908. Patterson Hall at North Carolina State University is named in his honor. He and his wife bequeathed Palmyra to the Episcopal Church as a school, which operated as The Patterson School from 1909 through 2009.

Political offices
Preceded by John Robinson	North Carolina Commissioner of Agriculture; 1895 – 1897	Succeeded by James M. Mewborne
Preceded by John R. Smith	North Carolina Commissioner of Agriculture; 1899 – 1908	Succeeded by William A. Graham
