= Montford McGehee =

American politician

2nd North Carolina Commissioner of Agriculture
- In office 1880–1887
- Appointed by: State Board of Agriculture
- Governor: Thomas J. Jarvis; Alfred M. Scales
- Preceded by: Leonidas L. Polk
- Succeeded by: John Robinson

Member of the North Carolina House of Representatives from Caswell County, North Carolina
- In office 1864–1864

Member of the North Carolina House of Representatives from Person County, North Carolina
- In office 1879–1879

Member of the North Carolina House of Representatives from Person County, North Carolina
- In office 1876–1876

Member of the North Carolina House of Representatives from Person County, North Carolina
- In office 1872–1872

Delegate to the North Carolina Constitutional Convention
- In office 1865–1866

Personal details
- Born: December 4, 1822 Person County, North Carolina, U.S.
- Died: March 31, 1895 (aged 72) Raleigh, North Carolina, U.S.
- Resting place: Oakwood Cemetery
- Party: Whig, Democratic
- Spouse: Sally Polk Badger
- Children: Lucius Polk McGehee
- Education: University of North Carolina, B.A., 1841; M.A. 1844; Harvard Law School

Montford McGehee (December 4, 1822 – March 31, 1895) was a North Carolina politician and farmer who served in the North Carolina General Assembly, and as the second North Carolina Commissioner of Agriculture.

== Education ==
McGehee graduated with his bachelor's degrees from the University of North Carolina in 1841, where in 1844, he also received his Master of Arts degree. From 1841 to 1842 McGehee studied law at Harvard Law School. After he left Harvard, McGehee furthered his legal education by reading for the law under the tutelage of North Carolina Judge W.H. Battle, and was admitted to the North Carolina Bar in 1844.

== Family life ==
=== Marriage ===
On September 25, 1854, McGehee married Sally Polk Badger, daughter of U.S. Senator George Edmund Badger, at Christ Church Raleigh, North Carolina.

=== Children ===
McGehee had a son Lucius Polk McGehee who was also a lawyer.

== Death ==
McGehee died on March 31, 1895, at age seventy-three at his home in Raleigh, North Carolina, after a long illness.

== End Notes ==
Political offices
Preceded by Leonidas L. Polk	2nd North Carolina Commissioner of Agriculture; 1880–1887	Succeeded by John Robinson
