= Britt Cobb =

American politician

Secretary of the North Carolina Department of Administration
- In office 2006–2010
- Governor: Mike Easley; Bev Perdue
- Preceded by: Gwynn T. Sinson
- Succeeded by: Moses Carey, Jr.

15th Agriculture Commissioner of North Carolina
- In office June 2003 – February 2005
- Governor: Mike Easley
- Preceded by: Meg Scott Phipps
- Succeeded by: Steve Troxler

Personal details
- Education: University of North Carolina at Chapel Hill

W. Britt Cobb, Jr. is a former North Carolina government official. His last position was as chief of staff for North Carolina Governor Beverly Perdue until she left office in January 2013. Previously, he had served as her Secretary of Administration (a member of Governor's Cabinet). Cobb was also Commissioner of Agriculture for the state of North Carolina between June 2003 and February 2005. He was appointed to the post in June 2003 following the resignation of Agriculture Commissioner Meg Scott Phipps and lost a hotly disputed race for the seat in 2004 to Republican Steve Troxler.

== Early life, education and career ==
Cobb was born in Elm City, North Carolina, and earned a bachelor's degree in business administration from the University of North Carolina at Chapel Hill. Cobb began working for the North Carolina Department of Agriculture shortly after his graduation as a food-distribution representative, and was the first agriculture director at North Carolina's European Office in West Germany during the late 1970s.

In 1991, Cobb was named assistant director of marketing for the Agriculture department, and he was appointed to the post of interim agriculture commissioner in June 2003 following the resignation of Meg Scott Phipps.

== Agriculture Commissioner ==
Cobb's appointment by Governor Mike Easley as North Carolina Commissioner of Agriculture was made official in December 2003; that same month, he announced his candidacy for the post in the 2004 statewide general elections. Cobb faced Republican Steve Troxler and finished only about 2,000 votes behind his opponent; however, 4,000 lost votes in Carteret County led to an extended legal dispute, in which Cobb and his attorneys pressed for a new statewide election for the race. On February 4, 2005, Cobb conceded the race and Troxler was sworn in as Agriculture Commissioner on February 8.

== Secretary of Administration ==
In 2005, Cobb became a Deputy Secretary in the North Carolina Department of Administration, and in January 2006, Governor Easley appointed him Secretary for the Department, succeeding Secretary Gwynn Swinson. In 2009, newly elected Governor Beverly Perdue chose to keep Cobb in her cabinet.

Party political offices
Preceded by Meg Scott Phipps	Democratic nominee for North Carolina Commissioner of Agriculture; 2004	Succeeded by Ronnie Ansley
Political offices
Preceded by Meg Scott Phipps	15th Agriculture Commissioner of North Carolina; 2003–2005	Succeeded by Steve Troxler
