= Good Neighbor Council =

Anti-racism organization in North Carolina

The Good Neighbor Council was an effort in North Carolina proposed by Governor Terry Sanford to fight racial segregation and encourage the employment of Black people in the state. David S. Coltrane was the first chairman and director of the Good Neighbor Council.

== Creation ==
On January 18, 1963, Governor Terry Sanford created the Good Neighbor Council to help ease racial tensions that were building in the state because of civil rights struggles and integration issues. The purpose of the councils was two-fold: to encourage the employment of qualified people without regard to race; and to encourage youth to become better trained and qualified for employment.

Governor Sanford established this council on January 13, 1968, and appointed David S. Coltrane as the first Chairman and Executive Director. He held this position until his death in 1968.

== Local branches ==
Local branches of the Good Neighbor Council were initially formed in Alamance County, North Carolina, Albemarle, North Carolina, Asheville, North Carolina, Chapel Hill, North Carolina, Charlotte, North Carolina, Dunn, North Carolina, Durham, North Carolina, Elizabeth City, North Carolina, Fayetteville, North Carolina, Gastonia, North Carolina, Goldsboro, North Carolina, Greensboro, North Carolina, Greenville, North Carolina, Hickory, North Carolina, High Point, North Carolina, Kinston, North Carolina, Laurinburg, North Carolina, Lexington, North Carolina, Mooresville, North Carolina, Mount Airy, North Carolina, Oxford, North Carolina, Raleigh, North Carolina, Rockingham, North Carolina, Roxboro, North Carolina, Rocky Mount, North Carolina, Salisbury, North Carolina, Sanford, North Carolina, Shelby, North Carolina, Smithfield, North Carolina, Thomasville, North Carolina, Wadesboro, North Carolina, Warrenton, North Carolina, Whiteville, North Carolina, Wilmington, North Carolina, Williamston, North Carolina, Winston-Salem, North Carolina, and Wilson, North Carolina.

== Evolution of the Good Neighbor Council ==
The Good Neighbor Council evolved into the state's North Carolina Human Relations Council, now North Carolina Human Relations Commission.

== Bibliography ==
- Coltrane, D. S. Guidelines for the Establishment of County-Wide Good Neighbor or Human Relations Councils. [Raleigh? N.C.]: [North Carolina Good Neighbor Council], 1965. At head of title: Memorandum. To: County Commissioners. From: D.S. Coltrane, chairman N.C. Good Neighbor Council.
- Coltrane, D. S. Speech by D.S. Coltrane, Chairman of the North Carolina Good Neighbor Council, to the Burke County Board of Education Desegregation Institute, Morganton, N.C. [Raleigh, N.C.]: [D.S. Coltrane], 1966.
- North Carolina Good Neighbor Council. At Work in North Carolina Today: 48 Case Reports on North Carolina Negroes Now Employed or Preparing Themselves for Employment ... Their Education, Job Qualifications, and Career Aspirations. Raleigh: The Council, 1965.
- North Carolina Good Neighbor Council. Equal Employment Opportunity in North Carolina: A Workbook for Community Leaders. Raleigh, N.C.: Equal Employment Project, N.C. Good Neighbor Council, 1968.
- North Carolina Good Neighbor Council. High Point, Progress in Human Relations: A Brief Report of the East Central Urban Renewal Project. Raleigh, N.C.: North Carolina Good Neighbor Council, 1967. "April, 1967." "Three articles which appeared in The High Point Enterprise ... and one article prepared by the staff of The High Point Redevelopment Commission"--Foreword.
- North Carolina Good Neighbor Council. [North Carolina]: [The Council], 1960.
- North Carolina Good Neighbor Council. Brief Summary: Economic Opportunity Act. [Raleigh?]: [Place of publication not identified], 1964.
- North Carolina Good Neighbor Council. Fourth Meeting of North Carolina Good Neighbor Council: Benbow Hall, A. and T. College, Greensboro. Raleigh, N.C.: The Council, 1964. "April 28, 1964." Includes reports presented by various participants during Council's one day session. Cover title: Reports and speeches of the fourth meeting.
- North Carolina Good Neighbor Council. The North Carolina Good Neighbor Program: A Description of Activities by the State Council and Suggestions for Local Councils. Raleigh, N.C.: North Carolina Good Neighbor Council, 1963.
- North Carolina Good Neighbor Council. The North Carolina Good Neighbor Council: As Seen Through Editorial Comments from North Carolina Newspapers. Raleigh, N.C.: North Carolina Good Neighbor Council, 1966.
- North Carolina Good Neighbor Council. Progress Report. Raleigh? N.C.: Good Neighbor Council, 1960.
- North Carolina Good Neighbor Council. Racial Incidents in North Carolina: Calendar 1970. [Raleigh? N.C.]: [North Carolina Good Neighbor Council], 1971.
- North Carolina Good Neighbor Council. Reports and Speeches of the Meeting, North Carolina Good Neighbor Council. Raleigh: North Carolina Good Neighbor Council], Journal, magazine: State or province government publication: English.
- North Carolina Good Neighbor Council. Survey of Employment in State Government. Raleigh, N.C.: The Council, 1964.
- North Carolina Good Neighbor Council. The Uniter. Raleigh, N.C.: The Council, 1970. Government publication, Periodical,
- North Carolina Good Neighbor Council. Vocational Training Opportunities in North Carolina. Raleigh, N.C.: The Council, 1963.
- Sanford, Terry. Terry Sanford Papers. 1946. In the Southern Historical Collection, University of North Carolina at Chapel Hill (#3531).
