= Josh Dobson =

American politician

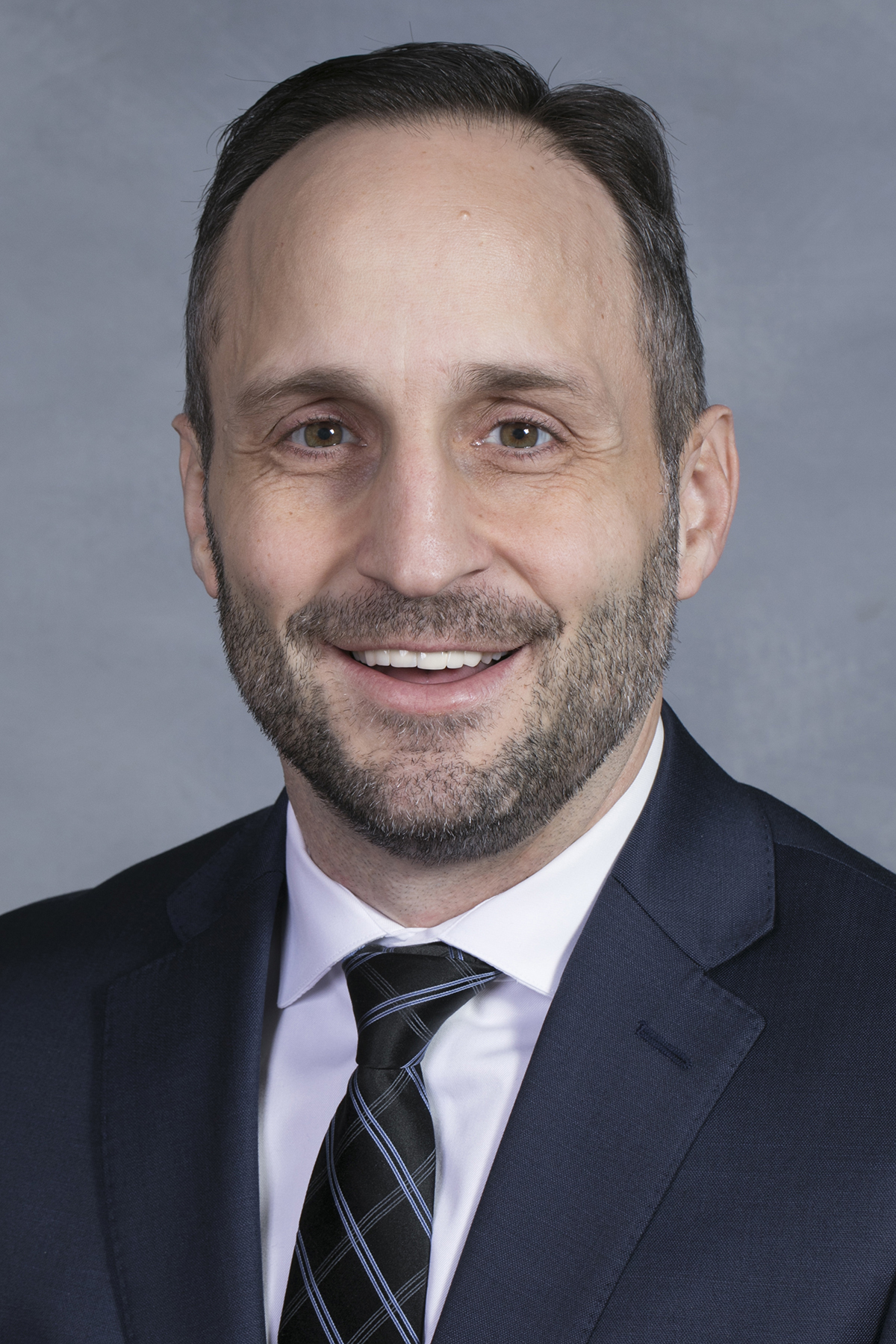

18th Labor Commissioner of North Carolina
- In office January 2, 2021 – November 6, 2024
- Governor: Roy Cooper
- Preceded by: Cherie Berry
- Succeeded by: Luke Farley

Member of the North Carolina House of Representatives from the 85th district
- In office January 29, 2013 – January 1, 2021
- Preceded by: Mitch Gillespie
- Succeeded by: Dudley Greene

Personal details
- Born: July 19, 1981 (age 45)
- Party: Republican
- Education: McDowell Technical Community College; Gardner-Webb University (BA); Appalachian State University (MPA)

Josh Dobson (born July 19, 1981) is a retired American politician. A member of the Republican Party, he served as North Carolina Commissioner of Labor from 2021 to 2024. He previously served in the North Carolina House of Representatives, representing McDowell County.

He resigned as Commissioner of Labor in 2024 after declining to run for reelection, stating he was leaving public service for private sector opportunities. Following his resignation, he became president and CEO of the North Carolina Healthcare Association.

== Early life and education ==
Dobson was born on July 19, 1981, in North Carolina. He grew up in Avery County, and graduated from Avery High School. He then went to McDowell Technical Community College, where he completed an associate’s degree. He later received a bachelor's degree from Gardner-Webb University, and earned a master’s degree in public administration from Appalachian State University.

== Political career ==
Before becoming a State Representative, Dobson was a county commissioner for McDowell County.

=== House of Representatives ===
He was appointed to the North Carolina House of Representatives on January 29, 2013, after Mitch Gillespie resigned.

=== Legislative tenure ===
==== 2014 election ====
Dobson was unopposed in the Republican primary, and he defeated JR Edwards in the general election.

2014 North Carolina House of Representatives election
Party	Candidate	Votes	%
Republican	Josh Dobson	15,467	74.9
Democratic	JR Edwards	5,188	25.1

==== 2016 election ====
Dobson was unopposed in both the Republican primary and the general election.

==== 2018 election ====
Dobson was unopposed in the Republican primary, and he defeated Howard Larsen in the general election.

2018 North Carolina House of Representatives election
Party	Candidate	Votes	%
Republican	Josh Dobson	20,408	74.9
Democratic	Howard Larson	6,822	25.1

=== Commissioner of Labor ===
==== 2020 election ====
In May 2019, Dobson decided to run for North Carolina Commissioner of Labor. He defeated Democrat Jessica Holmes in the November 2020 general election. He assumed office on January 2, 2021.

==== Tenure ====
On December 6, 2022, Dobson announced that he would not seek reelection or election to any other public office in 2024. He resigned on November 6, 2024, the day after 2024 elections, saying, "After 21 years of public service, I look forward to pursuing new opportunities in the private sector."

== Post-political career ==
Less than a week after resigning his position, it was announced he would become president and CEO of the North Carolina Healthcare Association.

Party political offices
Preceded by Cherie Berry	Republican nominee for Labor Commissioner of North Carolina; 2020	Succeeded by Luke Farley
Political offices
Preceded by Cherie Berry	Labor Commissioner of North Carolina; 2021–2024	Succeeded by Kevin O'Barr; Acting
