= John Robinson (agriculture commissioner) =

American politician (1831–1899)

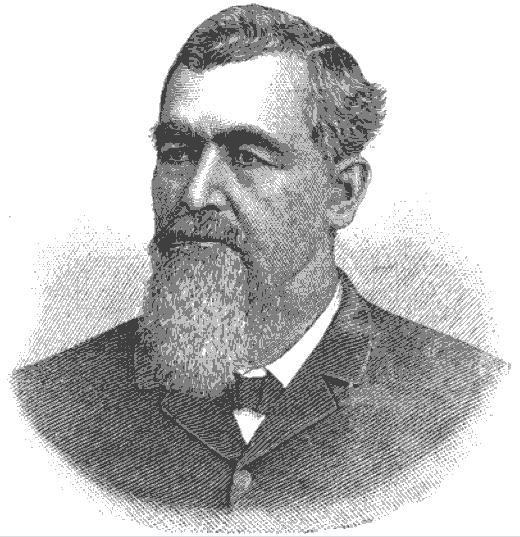

3rd North Carolina Commissioner of Agriculture
- In office 1887–1895
- Appointed by: State Board of Agriculture
- Governor: Alfred M. Scales; Daniel G. Fowle; Thomas M. Holt; Elias Carr
- Preceded by: Montford McGehee
- Succeeded by: Samuel L. Patterson

Personal details
- Born: March 20, 1831 Marlboro County, South Carolina, U.S.
- Died: March 29, 1899 (aged 68) near Raleigh, North Carolina, U.S.

John Robinson (March 20, 1831 – March 29, 1899) was a North Carolina politician who served as the third North Carolina Commissioner of Agriculture.

John Robinson was born on March 20, 1831, in Marlboro County, South Carolina. Shortly after his birth, his family moved to Anson County, North Carolina. He married twice, fathering six sons and one daughter.

In late January 1899, Robinson became afflicted by heart trouble. He died on March 29, 1899, at his home near Raleigh, North Carolina.

Political offices
Preceded by Montford McGehee	3rd North Carolina Commissioner of Agriculture; 1898 – 1899	Succeeded by Samuel L. Patterson
