= North Carolina's 85th House district =

American legislative district

North Carolina's 85th State House of Representatives district
Representative
Dudley Greene; R–Newland
- Demographics: 87% White; 3% Black; 7% Hispanic; 1% Asian; 2% Multiracial
- Population (2024): 91,522

North Carolina's 85th House district is one of 120 districts in the North Carolina House of Representatives. It has been represented by Republican Dudley Greene since 2021.

== Geography ==
Since 2023, the district has included all of Avery, Mitchell, and Yancey counties, as well as most of McDowell County. The district overlaps with the 46th and 47th Senate districts.

== District officeholders ==
Representative	Party	Dates	Notes	Counties
District created January 1, 1993.
Ronnie Sutton (Pembroke)	Democratic	January 1, 1993 – January 1, 2003	Redistricted to the 47th district.	1993–2003; Parts of Robeson and Hoke counties.
Mitch Gillespie (Marion)	Republican	January 1, 2003 – January 6, 2013	Redistricted from the 49th district. Resigned.	2003–2013; All of McDowell County; Part of Burke County.
Mitch Gillespie (Marion)	Republican	January 1, 2003 – January 6, 2013	Redistricted from the 49th district. Resigned.	2013–2023; All of Avery, Mitchell, and McDowell counties.
Vacant		January 6, 2013 – January 29, 2013		2013–2023; All of Avery, Mitchell, and McDowell counties.
Josh Dobson (Nebo)	Republican	January 29, 2013 – January 1, 2021	Appointed to finish Gillespie's term. Retired to run for Labor Commissioner.	2013–2023; All of Avery, Mitchell, and McDowell counties.
Dudley Greene (Newland)	Republican	January 1, 2021 – Present		2013–2023; All of Avery, Mitchell, and McDowell counties.
Dudley Greene (Newland)	Republican	January 1, 2021 – Present		2023–Present; All of Avery, Mitchell, and Yancey counties. Part of McDowell County.

== Election results ==
=== 2024 ===
North Carolina House of Representatives 85th district general election, 2024
Party	Candidate	Votes	%
Republican	Dudley Greene (incumbent)	36,145	74.19%
Democratic	John Ford	12,574	25.81%
Total votes		48,719	100%
Republican hold			

=== 2022 ===
North Carolina House of Representatives 85th district general election, 2022
Party	Candidate	Votes	%
Republican	Dudley Greene (incumbent)	26,613	74.59%
Democratic	Robert Cordle	9,066	25.41%
Total votes		35,679	100%
Republican hold			

=== 2020 ===
North Carolina House of Representatives 85th district general election, 2020
Party	Candidate	Votes	%
Republican	Dudley Greene	31,073	77.48%
Democratic	Ted Remington	9,031	22.52%
Total votes		40,104	100%
Republican hold			

=== 2018 ===
North Carolina House of Representatives 85th district general election, 2018
Party	Candidate	Votes	%
Republican	Josh Dobson (incumbent)	20,408	74.95%
Democratic	Howard Larsen	6,822	25.05%
Total votes		27,230	100%
Republican hold			

=== 2016 ===
North Carolina House of Representatives 85th district general election, 2016
Party	Candidate	Votes	%
Republican	Josh Dobson (incumbent)	29,064	100%
Total votes		29,064	100%
Republican hold			

=== 2014 ===
North Carolina House of Representatives 85th district general election, 2014
Party	Candidate	Votes	%
Republican	Josh Dobson (incumbent)	15,467	74.88%
Democratic	JR Edwards	5,188	25.12%
Total votes		20,655	100%
Republican hold			

=== 2012 ===
North Carolina House of Representatives 85th district general election, 2012
Party	Candidate	Votes	%
Republican	Mitch Gillespie (incumbent)	21,895	68.48%
Democratic	JR Edwards	10,077	31.52%
Total votes		31,972	100%
Republican hold			

=== 2010 ===
North Carolina House of Representatives 85th district Democratic primary election, 2010
Party	Candidate	Votes	%
Democratic	Beth Ostgaard	1,048	54.13%
Democratic	Aaron Bradley Scott	888	45.87%
Total votes		1,936	100%

North Carolina House of Representatives 85th district general election, 2010
Party	Candidate	Votes	%
Republican	Mitch Gillespie (incumbent)	12,421	69.01%
Democratic	Beth Ostgaard	5,577	30.99%
Total votes		17,998	100%
Republican hold			

=== 2008 ===
North Carolina House of Representatives 85th district general election, 2008
Party	Candidate	Votes	%
Republican	Mitch Gillespie (incumbent)	16,432	59.24%
Democratic	Chuck Aldridge	11,304	40.76%
Total votes		27,736	100%
Republican hold			

=== 2006 ===
North Carolina House of Representatives 85th district general election, 2006
Party	Candidate	Votes	%
Republican	Mitch Gillespie (incumbent)	8,899	54.07%
Democratic	Chuck Aldridge	7,560	45.93%
Total votes		16,459	100%
Republican hold			

=== 2004 ===
North Carolina House of Representatives 85th district general election, 2004
Party	Candidate	Votes	%
Republican	Mitch Gillespie (incumbent)	16,047	66.09%
Democratic	Philip J. Tate	8,234	33.91%
Total votes		24,281	100%
Republican hold			

=== 2002 ===
North Carolina House of Representatives 85th district general election, 2002
Party	Candidate	Votes	%
Republican	Mitch Gillespie (incumbent)	10,318	58.16%
Democratic	A. Everette Clark	7,424	41.84%
Total votes		17,742	100%
Republican hold			

=== 2000 ===
North Carolina House of Representatives 85th district general election, 2000
Party	Candidate	Votes	%
Democratic	Ronnie Sutton (incumbent)	12,927	100%
Total votes		12,927	100%
Democratic hold			
