= Dudley Greene =

American politician

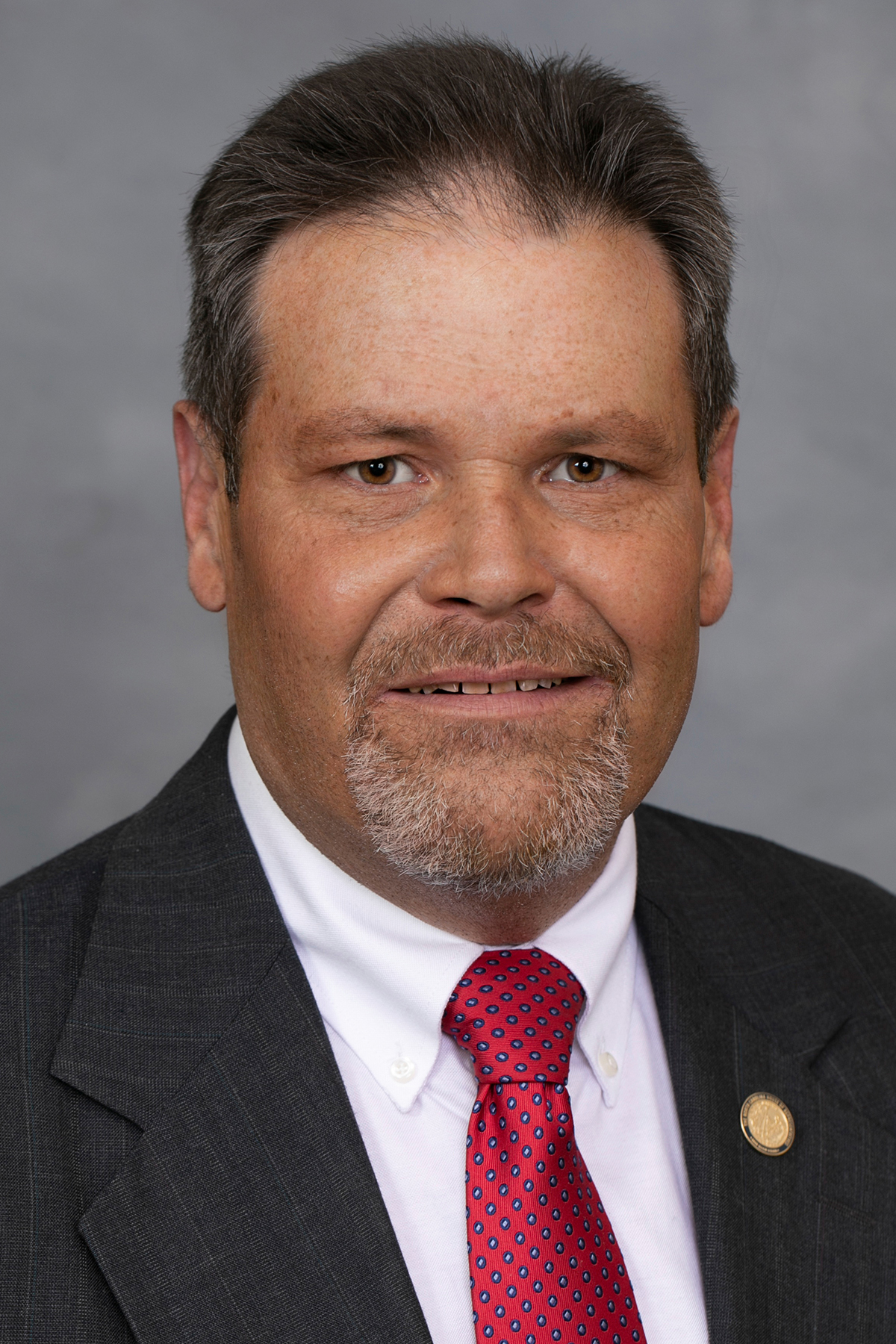

Member of the North Carolina House of Representatives from the 85th district
- Incumbent
- Assumed office January 1, 2021
- Preceded by: Josh Dobson

Personal details
- Born: Edwin Dudley Greene Newland, North Carolina, U.S.
- Party: Republican
- Spouse: Allyson
- Children: 2
- Education: Mayland Community College (AAS)
- Occupation: Retired sheriff
- Website: Official website

Edwin Dudley Greene is a Republican member of the North Carolina House of Representatives who has represented the 85th district (including all of Avery, McDowell, and Mitchell counties) since 2021.

Greene is a career law enforcement officer, previously working for the North Carolina Alcohol Law Enforcement division, Newland Police Department, Avery County Sheriff's Office and McDowell County Sheriff's Office. He served as Sheriff of McDowell County from 2008-2018, first being appointed in 2008 and was subsequently re-elected twice.

== Committee assignments ==
=== 2023-2024 session ===
- Appropriations (Vice chair)
- Appropriations, Justice and Public Safety (Chair)
- Families, Children, and Aging Policy
- House Select Committee on Helene Recovery (Chair)
- Judiciary II
- State Government
- State Personnel (Vice chair)

=== 2021-2022 session ===
- Appropriations - Justice and Public Safety
- Families, Children, and Aging Policy
- Judiciary II (Vice chair)
- Local Government - Land Use, Planning and Development
- State Personnel (Vice chair)
- Appropriations

== Electoral history ==
North Carolina House of Representatives 85th district general election, 2024
Party	Candidate	Votes	%
Republican	Dudley Greene	36,145	74.19%
Democratic	John Ford	12,574	25.81%
Total votes		48,719	100%
Republican hold			

North Carolina House of Representatives 85th district general election, 2022
Party	Candidate	Votes	%
Republican	Dudley Greene	26,613	74.59%
Democratic	Robert Cordle	9,066	25.41%
Total votes		35,679	100%
Republican hold			

North Carolina House of Representatives 85th district general election, 2020
Party	Candidate	Votes	%
Republican	Dudley Greene	31,073	77.48%
Democratic	Ted Remington	9,031	22.52%
Total votes		40,104	100%
Republican hold			

North Carolina House of Representatives
Preceded by Josh Dobson	Member of the North Carolina House of Representatives from the 85th district 2021–present	Incumbent
