= John R. Smith (agriculture commissioner) =

American politician (1837–1921)

6th North Carolina Commissioner of Agriculture
- In office January 1, 1898 – 1899
- Appointed by: State Board of Agriculture
- Governor: Daniel L. Russell
- Preceded by: James M. Mewborne
- Succeeded by: Samuel L. Patterson

Personal details
- Born: July 1837
- Died: April 14, 1921 (aged 83) Goldsboro, North Carolina, U.S.
- Party: Republican

John R. Smith (July 1837 – April 14, 1921) was an American politician who served as the sixth North Carolina Commissioner of Agriculture.

Smith was born in July 1837. He married twice.

Smith was a Republican. He was appointed superintendent of the State Penitentiary by Governor Daniel Lindsay Russell. He took office on March 7, 1897. Upon uncovering evidence of misconduct, Russell arranged for Smith swap to positions with James M. Mewborne, the commissioner of agriculture. The State Board of Agriculture elected him on December 14, 1897, to succeed Mewborne effective January 1, 1898. At the board's next meeting on June 14, a motion was introduced to deem Smith unfit for office and form a committee to ask for his resignation. After heated debate, the motion was tabled. Smith was succeeded by Samuel L. Patterson in 1899.

Smith died at his home in Goldsboro on April 14, 1921.

Political offices
Preceded by James M. Mewborne	6th North Carolina Commissioner of Agriculture; 1898 – 1899	Succeeded by Samuel L. Patterson
