= David S. Coltrane =

American politician

11th North Carolina Commissioner of Agriculture
- In office February 14, 1948 – 1949
- Appointed by: R. Gregg Cherry
- Preceded by: W. Kerr Scott
- Succeeded by: Lynton Y. Ballentine

Personal details
- Born: David Stanton Coltrane; July 27, 1893 Randolph County, North Carolina, U.S.
- Died: 1968 Raleigh, North Carolina, U.S.
- Education: Guilford College, North Carolina State College

David Stanton Coltrane (July 27, 1893 – 1968) was an American politician who served as the eleventh North Carolina Commissioner of Agriculture.

== Early life and education ==
Davis Stanton Coltrane was born, July 27, 1893, in Randolph County, North Carolina. He graduated from Guilford College in 1918 and received a graduate degree from North Carolina State College.

In the early 1930s Coltrane worked for the Mascot Lime Company.

== Political career ==
In the fall of 1935, Coltrane urged William Kerr Scott to run for the office of North Carolina Commissioner of Agriculture. When Scott entered the race for Agriculture Commissioner Coltrane stopped working for the lime company and worked for Scott full-time on the campaign trail.

=== Agriculture Commission ===
Coltrane worked as an assistant to Agriculture Commissioner Scott. As assistant commissioner Coltrane worked to improve the quality of fertilizer and feed sold to North Carolina farmers. When Scott resigned to run for governor, Coltrane was appointed by Governor R. Gregg Cherry as North Carolina Commissioner of Agriculture on February 14, 1948.

=== State budget officer ===
Coltrane continued to serve in state government later becoming a State Budget Officer for the North Carolina Department of Administration. He became special consultant to Governor Terry Sanford on economy and efficiency in government in December 1961. From 1958 to 1959, Coltrane was President of the National Association of State Budget Officers.

=== Good Neighbor Council ===
In the 1960s, Governor Sanford created the Good Neighbor Council to help ease racial tensions that were building in the state because of civil rights struggles and integration issues. Sanford established this council on January 13, 1963, and appointed Coltrane as the first chairman and executive director. He held this position until his death in 1968.

== Honors ==
- The North Carolina Human Relations Commission awards the David S. Coltrane Award in his memory.
- Coltrane Hall on the campus of North Carolina Agricultural and Technical State University is named after him, as well as Coltrane Hall on the campus of Appalachian State University in Boone, North Carolina.

Party political offices
Preceded by W. Kerr Scott	Democratic nominee for North Carolina Commissioner of Agriculture; 1948	Succeeded by Lynton Y. Ballentine
Political offices
Preceded by W. Kerr Scott	11th North Carolina Commissioner of Agriculture; February 14, 1948 – 1949	Succeeded by Lynton Y. Ballentine
