= Mitch Gillespie =

American politician from North Carolina

Representative Mitch Gillespie
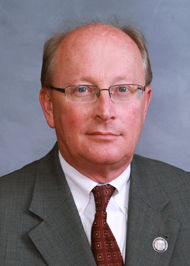
- Gillespie in 2011

Member of the North Carolina House of Representatives
- In office January 1, 1999 – January 6, 2013
- Preceded by: Annette Bryant
- Succeeded by: Josh Dobson
- Constituency: 49th District (1999-2003); 85th District (2003-2013)

Personal details
- Born: August 19, 1959 (age 67)
- Party: Republican
- Education: Wake Technical
- Occupation: Small Business Owner
- NCGA WebsiteProject Vote Smart

Robert Mitchell Gillespie is a former Assistant Secretary of the North Carolina Department of Environment and Natural Resources, and a former Republican member of the North Carolina General Assembly. He represented the eighty-fifth district in the North Carolina House of Representatives, which included constituents from Burke, Caldwell and McDowell counties. A small business owner from Marion, North Carolina, Gillespie served seven terms in the state House and was re-elected to an eighth term, but resigned to take his position in the executive branch in January 2013.

== Recent electoral history ==
=== 2012 ===
North Carolina House of Representatives 85th district general election, 2012
| Party | Candidate | Votes | % |
|---|---|---|---|
| Republican | Mitch Gillespie (incumbent) | 21,895 | 68.48% |
| Democratic | JR Edwards | 10,077 | 31.52% |
| Total votes | | 31,972 | 100% |
| Republican hold | | | |

=== 2010 ===
North Carolina House of Representatives 85th district general election, 2010
| Party | Candidate | Votes | % |
|---|---|---|---|
| Republican | Mitch Gillespie (incumbent) | 12,421 | 69.01% |
| Democratic | Beth Ostgaard | 5,577 | 30.99% |
| Total votes | | 17,998 | 100% |
| Republican hold | | | |

=== 2008 ===
North Carolina House of Representatives 85th district general election, 2008
| Party | Candidate | Votes | % |
|---|---|---|---|
| Republican | Mitch Gillespie (incumbent) | 16,432 | 59.24% |
| Democratic | Chuck Aldridge | 11,304 | 40.76% |
| Total votes | | 27,736 | 100% |
| Republican hold | | | |

=== 2006 ===
North Carolina House of Representatives 85th district general election, 2006
| Party | Candidate | Votes | % |
|---|---|---|---|
| Republican | Mitch Gillespie (incumbent) | 8,899 | 54.07% |
| Democratic | Chuck Aldridge | 7,560 | 45.93% |
| Total votes | | 16,459 | 100% |
| Republican hold | | | |

=== 2004 ===
North Carolina House of Representatives 85th district general election, 2004
| Party | Candidate | Votes | % |
|---|---|---|---|
| Republican | Mitch Gillespie (incumbent) | 16,047 | 66.09% |
| Democratic | Philip J. Tate | 8,234 | 33.91% |
| Total votes | | 24,281 | 100% |
| Republican hold | | | |

=== 2002 ===
North Carolina House of Representatives 85th district general election, 2002
| Party | Candidate | Votes | % |
|---|---|---|---|
| Republican | Mitch Gillespie (incumbent) | 10,318 | 58.16% |
| Democratic | A. Everette Clark | 7,424 | 41.84% |
| Total votes | | 17,742 | 100% |
| Republican hold | | | |

=== 2000 ===
North Carolina House of Representatives 49th district general election, 2000
| Party | Candidate | Votes | % |
|---|---|---|---|
| Republican | Mitch Gillespie (incumbent) | 14,174 | 60.34% |
| Democratic | David Huskins | 9,315 | 39.66% |
| Total votes | | 23,489 | 100% |
| Republican hold | | | |

North Carolina House of Representatives
| Preceded by Annette Bryant | Member of the North Carolina House of Representatives from the 49th district 1999–2003 | Succeeded by Lucy Allen |
| Preceded by Ronnie Sutton | Member of the North Carolina House of Representatives from the 85th district 2003–2013 | Succeeded by Josh Dobson |
