= Steve Troxler =

American politician (born 1952)

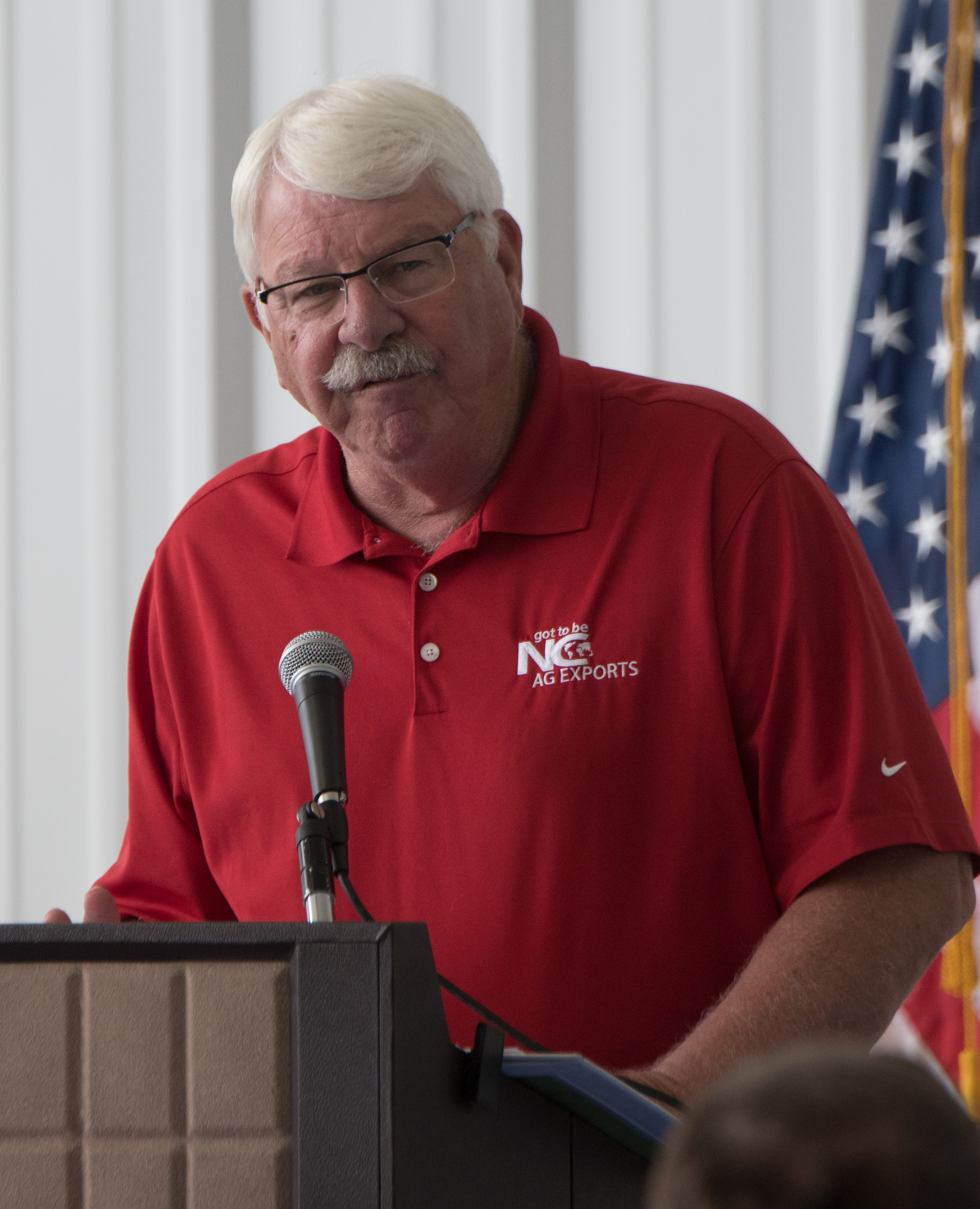

16th Agriculture Commissioner of North Carolina
- Incumbent
- Assumed office February 8, 2005
- Governor: Mike Easley; Bev Perdue; Pat McCrory; Roy Cooper; Josh Stein
- Preceded by: Britt Cobb

Personal details
- Born: 1952 (age 73–74) Browns Summit, North Carolina, U.S.
- Party: Republican
- Education: North Carolina State University (BS)

Steve W. Troxler (born 1952) is an American farmer and politician who has served as the 16th Agriculture Commissioner of North Carolina since 2005. Because of a contested election due to lost ballots in the November 2004 statewide elections, he was not sworn in until February 8, 2005. He was re-elected in 2008, 2012, 2016, 2020 and 2024.

== Biography ==
Troxler was born and grew up in Browns Summit, North Carolina, where he attended local schools. He studied conservation at North Carolina State University, earning a bachelor's degree in 1974.

Troxler originally leased farmland in Browns Summit before he purchased some after he got his degree and primarily grew tobacco. After he was elected to office, he planted less tobacco in favor of wheat and produce.

== Political career ==
Troxler was originally a member of the Democratic Party, but left the organization in the late 1990s, feeling that Democrats were hostile to tobacco production. Jerry Blackwelder, a Republican Party consultant, recruited him as a candidate for the office of North Carolina Commissioner of Agriculture. Troxler ran in 2000, losing to Meg Scott Phipps. Due to a financial corruption scandal, Phipps was replaced by Democrat Britt Cobb in 2003.

Troxler ran again for the same position in the 2004 Council of State election, finishing 2,287 votes ahead of incumbent Cobb. However, because more than 4,000 votes were lost in Carteret County, the race was unresolved for more than three months. After extended legal challenges between Cobb and Troxler, Cobb conceded the race on February 4, 2005.

Troxler was sworn in as North Carolina Agriculture Commissioner on February 8, 2005. He was the first Republican to be elected as Agriculture Commissioner in the state's history, reflecting the ascendancy of the party in the state. After his inauguration at the North Carolina State Fairgrounds, Troxler rode a tractor to his downtown offices. Troxler was re-elected in 2008 as Commissioner of Agriculture and Consumer Services for the state of North Carolina. As of 2025 he is currently serving his sixth term.

Because of a state law passed in 2013 that expanded venues for carrying legally permitted weapons, in 2014 a gun owners group challenged the no-guns policy of the North Carolina State Fair. Troxler enforced the ban that year while court cases were litigated. A Wake County Superior Court upheld the ban at the fair later that year. By early 2015, some legislators introduced bills to allow guns, while others introduced a bill to maintain the ban on carrying guns at the fair. The ban continues as of 2023.

== Electoral history ==
North Carolina Commissioner of Agriculture Republican Primary Election, 2000
Party	Candidate	Votes	%
Republican	Steve Troxler	66,257	27.37
Republican	Tom Davidson	58,189	24.04
Republican	Billy Guthrie	50,386	20.81
Republican	David Rouzer	28,134	11.62
Republican	Frank Tadlock	20,020	8.27
Republican	Elbie Powers	19,098	7.89

North Carolina Commissioner of Agriculture Election, 2000
Party	Candidate	Votes	%
Democratic	Meg Scott Phipps	1,418,164	50.57
Republican	Steve Troxler	1,386,311	49.43

North Carolina Commissioner of Agriculture Election, 2004
Party	Candidate	Votes	%
Republican	Steve Troxler	1,666,197	50.03
Democratic	Britt Cobb (inc.)	1,663,910	49.97

North Carolina Commissioner of Agriculture Election, 2008
Party	Candidate	Votes	%
Republican	Steve Troxler (inc.)	2,130,146	52.05
Democratic	Ronnie Ansley	1,962,741	47.95

North Carolina Commissioner of Agriculture Election, 2012
Party	Candidate	Votes	%
Republican	Steve Troxler (inc.)	2,303,586	53.22
Democratic	Walter Smith	2,025,054	46.78

North Carolina Commissioner of Agriculture Republican Primary Election, 2016
Party	Candidate	Votes	%
Republican	Steve Troxler (inc.)	634,100	68.77
Republican	Andy Stevens	287,948	31.23

North Carolina Commissioner of Agriculture Election, 2016
Party	Candidate	Votes	%
Republican	Steve Troxler (inc.)	2,524,445	55.56
Democratic	Walter Smith	2,018,872	44.44

North Carolina Commissioner of Agriculture Election, 2020
Party	Candidate	Votes	%
Republican	Steve Troxler (inc.)	2,901,849	53.86
Democratic	Jenna Wadsworth	2,485,722	46.14

North Carolina Commissioner of Agriculture Republican Primary Election, 2024
Party	Candidate	Votes	%
Republican	Steve Troxler (inc.)	634,100	68.77
Republican	Colby Hammonds	288,247	30.90

North Carolina Commissioner of Agriculture Election, 2024
Party	Candidate	Votes	%
Republican	Steve Troxler (inc.)	2,922,483	52.61
Democratic	Sarah Taber	2,496,474	44.95
Libertarian	Sean Haugh	135,513	2.44

Party political offices
Preceded by Tom Davidson	Republican nominee for Agriculture Commissioner of North Carolina; 2000, 2004, 2008, 2012, 2016, 2020, 2024	Most recent
Political offices
Preceded by Britt Cobb	16th Agriculture Commissioner of North Carolina; 2005–present	Incumbent
