= Lynton Y. Ballentine =

American politician (1899–1964)

Lynton Yates Ballentine
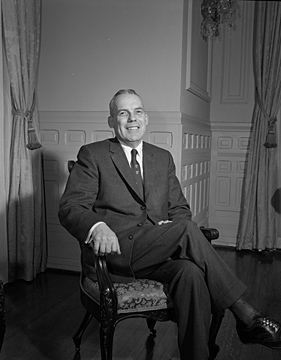

12th North Carolina Commissioner of Agriculture
- In office 1949 – July 19, 1964
- Governor: W. Kerr Scott; William B. Umstead; Luther H. Hodges; Terry Sanford
- Preceded by: David S. Coltrane
- Succeeded by: James Allen Graham

20th Lieutenant Governor of North Carolina
- In office January 4, 1945 – January 6, 1949
- Governor: R. Gregg Cherry
- Preceded by: Reginald L. Harris
- Succeeded by: Hoyt Patrick Taylor

Member of the North Carolina Senate Thirteenth Senatorial District
- In office 1937–1943

Member of the Wake County Board of Commissioners
- In office 1926–1934

Personal details
- Born: April 6, 1899 Varina, North Carolina, U.S.
- Died: July 19, 1964 (aged 65) White Sulphur Springs, West Virginia, U.S.
- Party: Democratic
- Education: Wake Forest University (BA)
- Nickname: Stag

Lynton Yates Ballentine (April 6, 1899 – July 19, 1964) was a North Carolina politician who served as the 20th Lieutenant Governor of North Carolina from 1945 to 1949 and as the 12th North Carolina Commissioner of Agriculture from 1949 until his death on July 19, 1964.

== Early life ==
Ballentine, also known by the nickname "Stag", was born on April 6, 1899, to James Erastus and Lillian (Yates) Ballentine on a farm in Varina, North Carolina.

== Education ==
Ballentine attended Oakwood and Cardenas Elementary Schools and from 1913–1917 Holly Springs High School. In 1921 Ballentine received his B.A. in Political Economy from Wake Forest College, now known as Wake Forest University.

== Early political career ==
After graduating from Wake Forest College, Ballentine returned home to help operate the family dairy farm. Ballentine was active in the North Carolina Democratic Party, and was elected to the Wake County Board of Commissioners and to the North Carolina Senate before seeking statewide office.

== Death ==
Ballentine died on July 19, 1964, of coronary thrombosis, coronary atherosclerosis in White Sulphur Springs, West Virginia.

== See also ==
- 1944 North Carolina lieutenant gubernatorial election

== End Notes ==
Party political offices
| Preceded by Reginald L. Harris | Democratic nominee for Lieutenant Governor of North Carolina; 1944 | Succeeded by Hoyt Patrick Taylor |
| Preceded by David S. Coltrane | Democratic nominee for North Carolina Commissioner of Agriculture; 1948, 1952, 1956, 1960 | Succeeded by James Allen Graham |
Political offices
| Preceded by Reginald L. Harris | 20th Lieutenant Governor of North Carolina; 1945-1949 | Succeeded by Hoyt Patrick Taylor |
| Preceded by David S. Coltrane | 12th North Carolina Commissioner of Agriculture; 1949–July 19, 1964 | Succeeded by James Allen Graham |
