= Luke Farley =

American politician from North Carolina

20th Labor Commissioner of North Carolina
- Incumbent
- Assumed office January 1, 2025
- Governor: Josh Stein
- Preceded by: Josh Dobson

Personal details
- Born: 1985 (age 40–41) Jacksonville, North Carolina, U.S.
- Party: Republican
- Children: 3
- Education: University of North Carolina, Chapel Hill (BA); Wake Forest University (JD)

Luke John Farley (born 1985) is an American politician and attorney who has served as the 19th and current North Carolina Commissioner of Labor since 2025. A member of the Republican Party, he supports right-to-work laws, vocational education and apprenticeship programs, while opposing vaccination mandates for workers.

== Early life and career ==
Farley was born in 1986 in Jacksonville, North Carolina, and was raised in Onslow County. He received his bachelor's degree from the University of North Carolina at Chapel Hill and his Juris Doctor from Wake Forest University School of Law.

Before running for office, Farley worked as an OSHA attorney in private practice for over 14 years.

== North Carolina Labor Commissioner ==
In October 2023, Farley declared his candidacy for North Carolina commissioner of labor after incumbent commissioner Josh Dobson announced he wouldn't seek re-election. In March 2024, he defeated several candidates in the Republican primary, including state representative Jon Hardister. Farley was endorsed during the primary by former Labor commissioner Cherie Berry, while Hardister was endorsed by commissioner Josh Dobson.

Farley faced former Charlotte city councilman Braxton Winston in the 2024 North Carolina commissioner of labor election. Winston campaigned on progressive issues and increasing the minimum wage while Farley supported increasing occupational safety and health as well as his "Make Elevators Great Again" program. Farley received the endorsement of the North Carolina Chamber of Commerce during the race and defeated Winston in the general election by over 300,000 votes.

On January 1, 2025, Farley was sworn in as the 19th Labor commissioner of North Carolina.

== Personal life ==
Farley is a religious Christian. He is married to his wife; they have three sons and live in Raleigh, North Carolina.

Political offices
| Preceded by Kevin O'Barr; Acting | Labor Commissioner of North Carolina; 2021–2024 | Incumbent |
