= Hoyt Patrick Taylor =

American politician

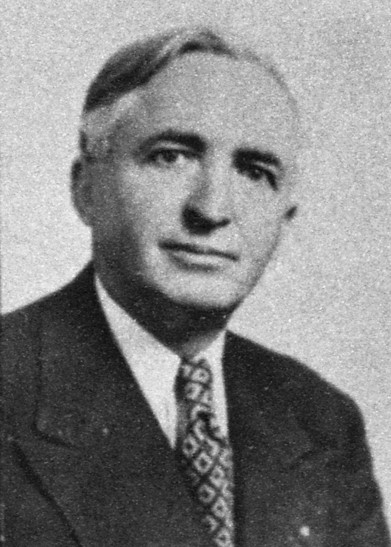

21st Lieutenant Governor of North Carolina
- In office January 6, 1949 – January 8, 1953
- Governor: W. Kerr Scott
- Preceded by: Lynton Y. Ballentine
- Succeeded by: Luther H. Hodges

Member of the North Carolina Senate from the 19th district
- In office 1943–1945 Serving with Coble Funderburk
- Preceded by: Robert Ray Ingram
- Succeeded by: Robert E. Little Jr.
- In office 1936–1941
- Preceded by: W. Erskine Smith
- Succeeded by: Coble Funderburk

Mayor of Wadesboro, North Carolina
- In office 1919–1921

Personal details
- Born: June 11, 1890 Winton, North Carolina, U.S.
- Died: April 12, 1964 (aged 73)
- Party: Democratic
- Spouse: Inez Wooten (m. 1923)
- Children: 3, including Pat
- Education: Wake Forest College

Military service
- Branch/service: United States Army
- Rank: Second Lieutenant
- Commands: 371st Infantry Regiment
- Battles/wars: World War I
- Awards: Silver Star; Purple Heart

Hoyt Patrick Taylor Sr. (June 11, 1890 – April 12, 1964) was the 21st Lieutenant Governor of North Carolina from 1949 to 1953.

== Early life ==
Taylor was born in Winton, North Carolina on June 11, 1890 to Simeon P. and Kate (née Ward) Taylor.

== Education ==
Taylor attended Winton Academy, Winton High School, Horner Military Academy and Wake Forest College.

== Family life ==
In 1923 Taylor married Inez Wooten of Chadbourn. They had three children: Hoyt Patrick Taylor Jr., Caroline Corbett Taylor Craig (married to Tom Craig), and Frank Wooten Taylor. Hoyt Patrick "Pat" Taylor Jr. was also elected lieutenant governor, twenty years after his father.

== Military service ==
Taylor served as a second lieutenant in the 371st Infantry during World War I and received the Silver Star and Purple Heart as well as a personal citation from General John Joseph Pershing.

== Business career ==
For many years Taylor practiced law in Wadesboro, North Carolina, for a time in partnership with Congressman A. Paul Kitchin.

== Early political career ==
A Democrat, Taylor served as mayor of Wadesboro, as chairman of the Anson County Democratic Executive Committee, as a member of the North Carolina Senate from the 19th district (sessions of 1936, 1937, 1938, 1939, and 1943), and as legislative assistant to Governor Robert Gregg Cherry (1945).

Taylor served as a trustee of the University of North Carolina at Chapel Hill and Meredith College.

== End Notes ==
Party political offices
Preceded by Lynton Y. Ballentine	Democratic nominee for Lieutenant Governor of North Carolina; 1948	Succeeded by Luther H. Hodges
Political offices
Preceded by Lynton Y. Ballentine	Lieutenant Governor of North Carolina; 1949–1953	Succeeded by Luther H. Hodges
