= Reginald L. Harris =

American politician

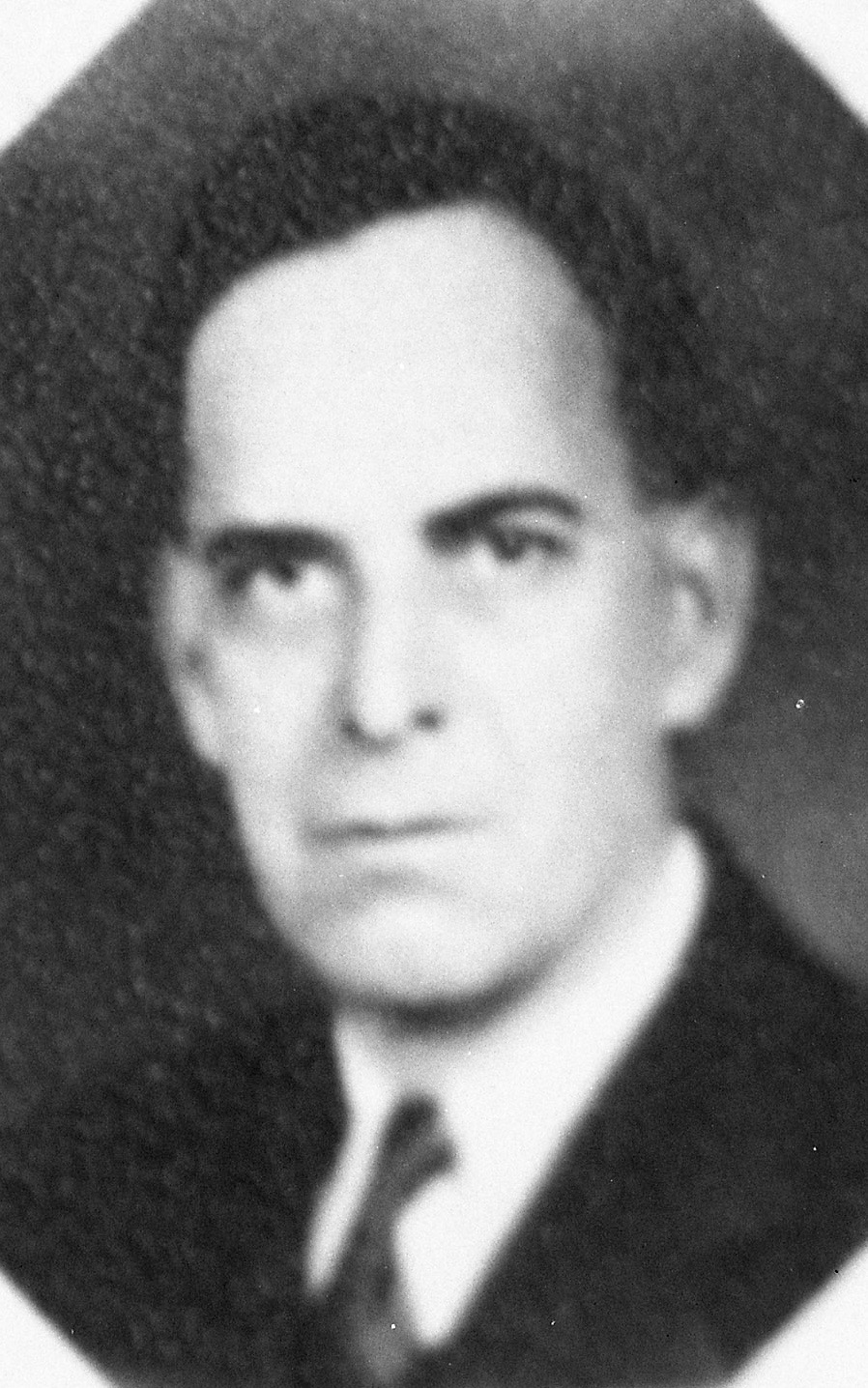
Harris in 1935

Reginald Lee Harris (September 9, 1890 – October 27, 1959) was a North Carolina politician who served as Speaker of the North Carolina House of Representatives in 1933 and as the 19th Lieutenant Governor of North Carolina from 1941 to 1945 serving under Governor J. Melville Broughton. A Democrat, Harris lived in Roxboro, North Carolina.

Party political offices
Preceded by Wilkins P. Horton	Democratic nominee for Lieutenant Governor of North Carolina; 1940	Succeeded by Lynton Y. Ballentine
Political offices
Preceded by Wilkins P. Horton	Lieutenant Governor of North Carolina; 1941-1945	Succeeded by Lynton Y. Ballentine
