= 1940 North Carolina lieutenant gubernatorial election =

- November 5, 1940
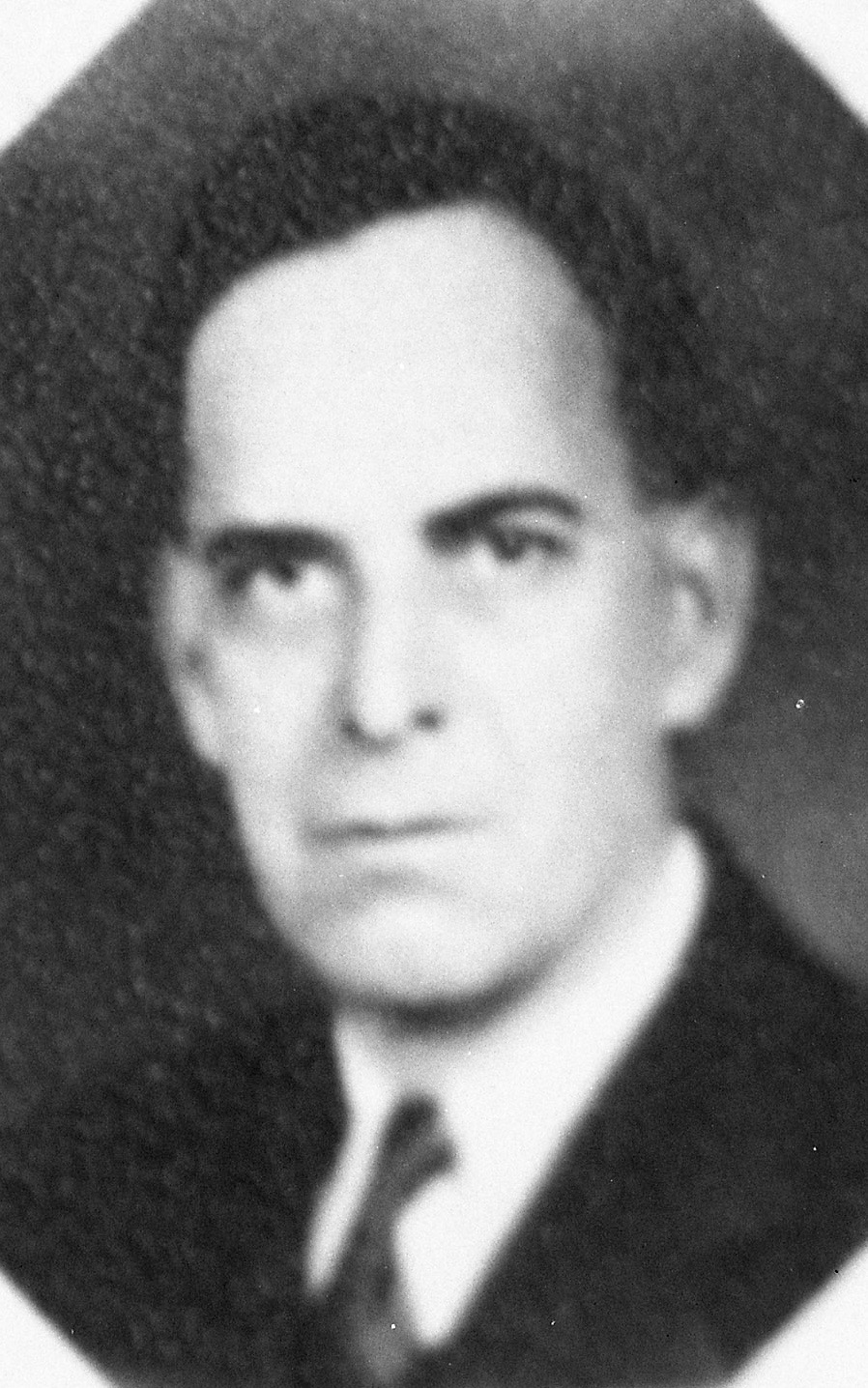

Nominee	Reginald L. Harris	Halsey B. Leavitt
Party	Democratic	Republican
Popular vote	600,706	193,433
Percentage	75.64%	24.36%
Lieutenant Governor before election
Wilkins P. Horton
Democratic
Elected Lieutenant Governor
Reginald L. Harris
Democratic

The 1940 North Carolina lieutenant gubernatorial election was held on November 5, 1940. Democratic nominee Reginald L. Harris defeated Republican nominee Halsey B. Leavitt with 75.64% of the vote.

== Primary elections ==
Primary elections were held on May 25, 1940.

=== Democratic primary ===
==== Candidates ====
- Reginald L. Harris, former Speaker of the North Carolina House of Representatives
- W. Erskine Smith, businessman
- Lister A. Martin
- Daniel L. Tompkins

==== Results ====
Democratic primary results
Party	Candidate	Votes	%
Democratic	Reginald L. Harris	150,661	37.88
Democratic	W. Erskine Smith	127,522	32.06
Democratic	Lister A. Martin	76,861	19.33
Democratic	Daniel L. Tompkins	42,672	10.73
Total votes		397,716	100.00

=== Republican primary ===
==== Candidates ====
- Halsey B. Leavitt, businessman
- J. Forrest Witten

==== Results ====
Republican primary results
Party	Candidate	Votes	%
Republican	Halsey B. Leavitt	11,777	52.62
Republican	J. Forrest Witten	10,606	47.38
Total votes		407,273	100.00

== General election ==
=== Candidates ===
- Reginald L. Harris, Democratic
- Halsey B. Leavitt, Republican

=== Results ===
1940 North Carolina lieutenant gubernatorial election
Party	Candidate	Votes	%	±%
Democratic	Reginald L. Harris	600,706	75.64%	
Republican	Halsey B. Leavitt	193,433	24.36%	
Majority		407,273		
Turnout				
Democratic hold		Swing		
