= James Allen Graham =

American politician (1921–2003)

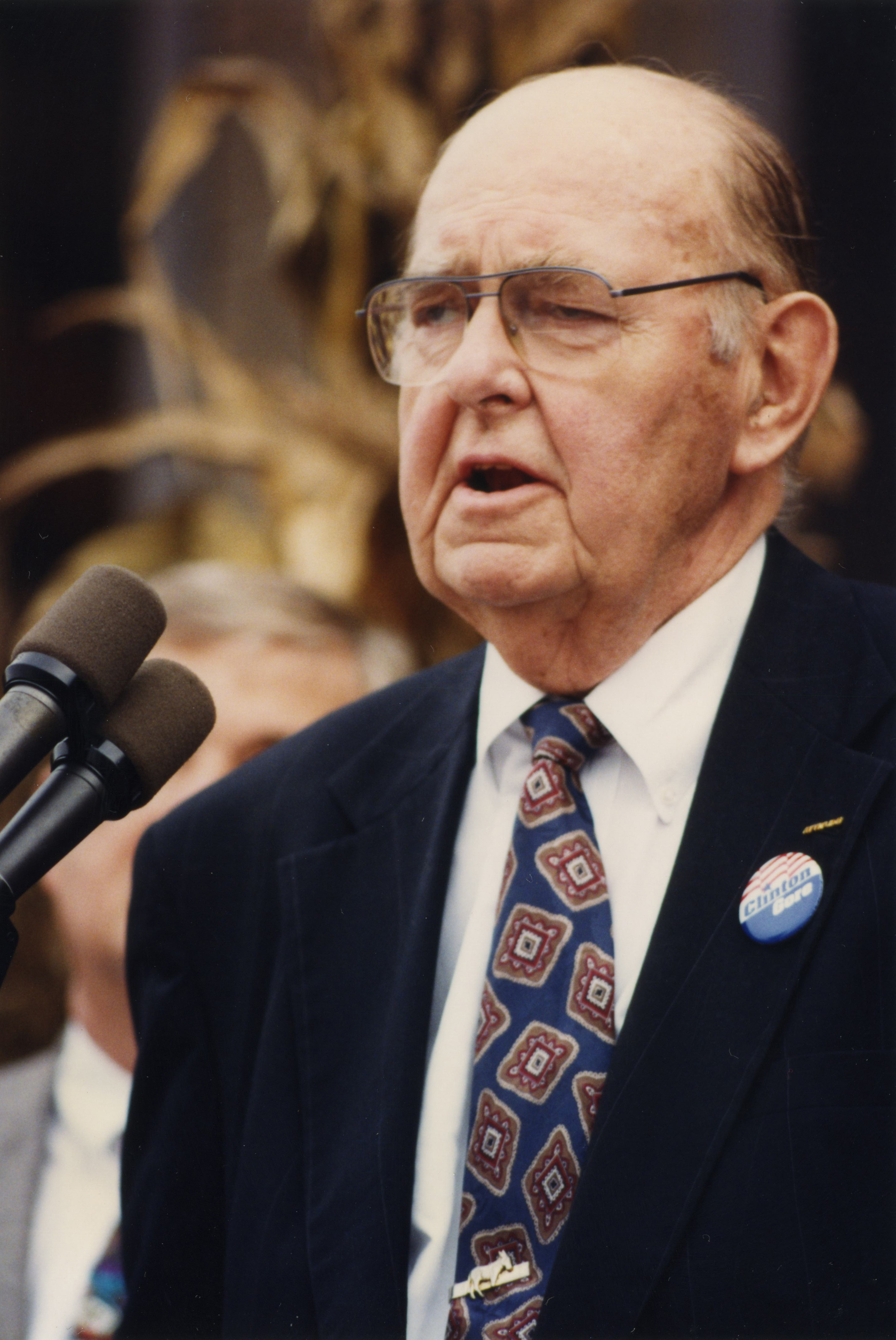
- Graham in 1992

13th North Carolina Commissioner of Agriculture
- In office July 19, 1964 – January 2001
- Appointed by: Terry Sanford
- Governor: Terry Sanford; Dan K. Moore; Robert W. Scott; James Holshouser; Jim Hunt; James G. Martin
- Preceded by: Lynton Y. Ballentine
- Succeeded by: Meg Scott Phipps

Personal details
- Born: April 7, 1921 Cleveland, North Carolina, U.S.
- Died: November 20, 2003 (aged 82)
- Party: Democratic
- Spouse: Helen Ida Kirk (October 30, 1942 – her death 1999)
- Education: North Carolina State University (BS)
- Nickname: Jim

James Allen Graham (April 27, 1921 – November 20, 2003) was an American teacher and politician who served as the thirteenth North Carolina commissioner of agriculture.

== Early life ==
Graham was born on April 7, 1921, to James Turner and Laura Blanche Allen Graham in Cleveland, North Carolina. Graham was raised in Rowan County, North Carolina, on a 250-acre farm where the family raised cotton, cattle and grain.

== Education ==
Graham graduated from Cleveland High School in 1938, where he played on the High School football team. In 1942 Graham graduated with a Bachelor of Science in Agricultural Education from North Carolina State College where he was a member of Tau Kappa Epsilon fraternity.

== Family life ==
Jim Graham married Helen Ida Kirk, on October 30, 1942, they had two daughters, Alice Kirk Graham, and Laura Constance Graham.

== Commissioner of Agriculture ==
On July 19, 1964, Graham was appointed North Carolina Commissioner of Agriculture, by Governor Terry Sanford, to fill the unexpired term of the late Lynton Y. Ballentine. Graham was elected Commissioner of Agriculture in November 1964 and reelected eight times.

== Writings ==
- Graham, James A.: The Sodfather: A Friend of Agriculture, (1998).

Party political offices
Preceded by Lynton Y. Ballentine	Democratic nominee for North Carolina Commissioner of Agriculture; 1964, 1968, 1972, 1976, 1980, 1984, 1988, 1992, 1996	Succeeded by Meg Scott Phipps
Political offices
Preceded by Lynton Y. Ballentine	13th North Carolina Commissioner of Agriculture; July 19, 1964 – January 2001	Succeeded by Meg Scott Phipps
