= Meg Scott Phipps =

American politician

14th North Carolina Commissioner of Agriculture
- In office 2001 – June 6, 2003
- Governor: Mike Easley
- Preceded by: James Allen Graham
- Succeeded by: Britt Cobb

Personal details
- Education: Wake Forest University (BA); Campbell University (JD); University of Arkansas (LLM); University of North Carolina at Greensboro (MA)

Meg Scott Phipps is an American former politician who served as the Commissioner of Agriculture for the state of North Carolina from 2001 to 2003.

== Early life and education ==
From Mebane, North Carolina, she is the daughter of former North Carolina governor Bob Scott and Jessie Rae Scott, as well as the granddaughter of former U.S. Senator and North Carolina Governor W. Kerr Scott. Phipps is a 1978 graduate of Wake Forest University and a 1981 graduate of the Norman Adrian Wiggins School of Law at Campbell University. She also received her Masters in Law in Agricultural Law from the University of Arkansas School of Law.

== Career ==
A Democrat, she was elected to the position of Agriculture Commissioner in November 2000. Controversy erupted less than a month into her term when she selected a new midway vendor for the North Carolina State Fair, replacing a longtime vendor, who immediately filed suit against the state.

In May 2001, allegations emerged of inappropriate use of campaign funds from her 2000 campaign.

=== Resignation and criminal charges ===
After two campaign aides were indicted and one pleaded guilty to federal fraud and extortion charges, North Carolina Governor Mike Easley asked Phipps to resign her position. On June 6, 2003, she resigned and was replaced by interim commissioner Britt Cobb.

In October 2003, Phipps was tried and found guilty of perjury and obstruction of justice charges; soon afterwards, she pleaded guilty to five of the original 30 federal charges against her, including fraud, conspiracy, and witness tampering. In March 2004, she was sentenced to four years in federal prison and served her sentence at Alderson Federal Prison Camp in West Virginia.

While in prison, Phipps became friends with Martha Stewart, who was also incarcerated there. While serving her sentence, Phipps taught English and other courses to her fellow inmates. She was briefly allowed out to attend her brother Kerr's funeral.

== Later life ==
On April 23, 2007, Phipps was released from prison. Hawfields Presbyterian Church hired her as its director of Christian education. Monitored by an ankle bracelet for six months, she could only leave her house to tend to work-related affairs. After three years she was hired by Alamance Community College to teach women's studies and undertook further education at the University of North Carolina at Greensboro, earning a Master of Arts degree. She later worked as an administrator for assisted living facilities in Mebane and Chapel Hill before retiring and moving with her husband to Lake Lure in 2017.

== Works cited ==
- Christensen, Rob (2019). The Rise and Fall of the Branchhead Boys: North Carolina's Scott Family and the Era of Progressive Politics. Chapel Hill: The University of North Carolina Press. ISBN 9781469651057.

Party political offices
Preceded by James Allen Graham	Democratic nominee for North Carolina Commissioner of Agriculture; 2000	Succeeded by Britt Cobb
Preceded by James Allen Graham	14th North Carolina Commissioner of Agriculture; 2001 – 2003	Succeeded by Britt Cobb
