= North Carolina Commissioner of Agriculture =

Elected state government official in North Carolina, United States

Commissioner of Agriculture of North Carolina
- Seal of the North Carolina Department of Agriculture and Consumer Services

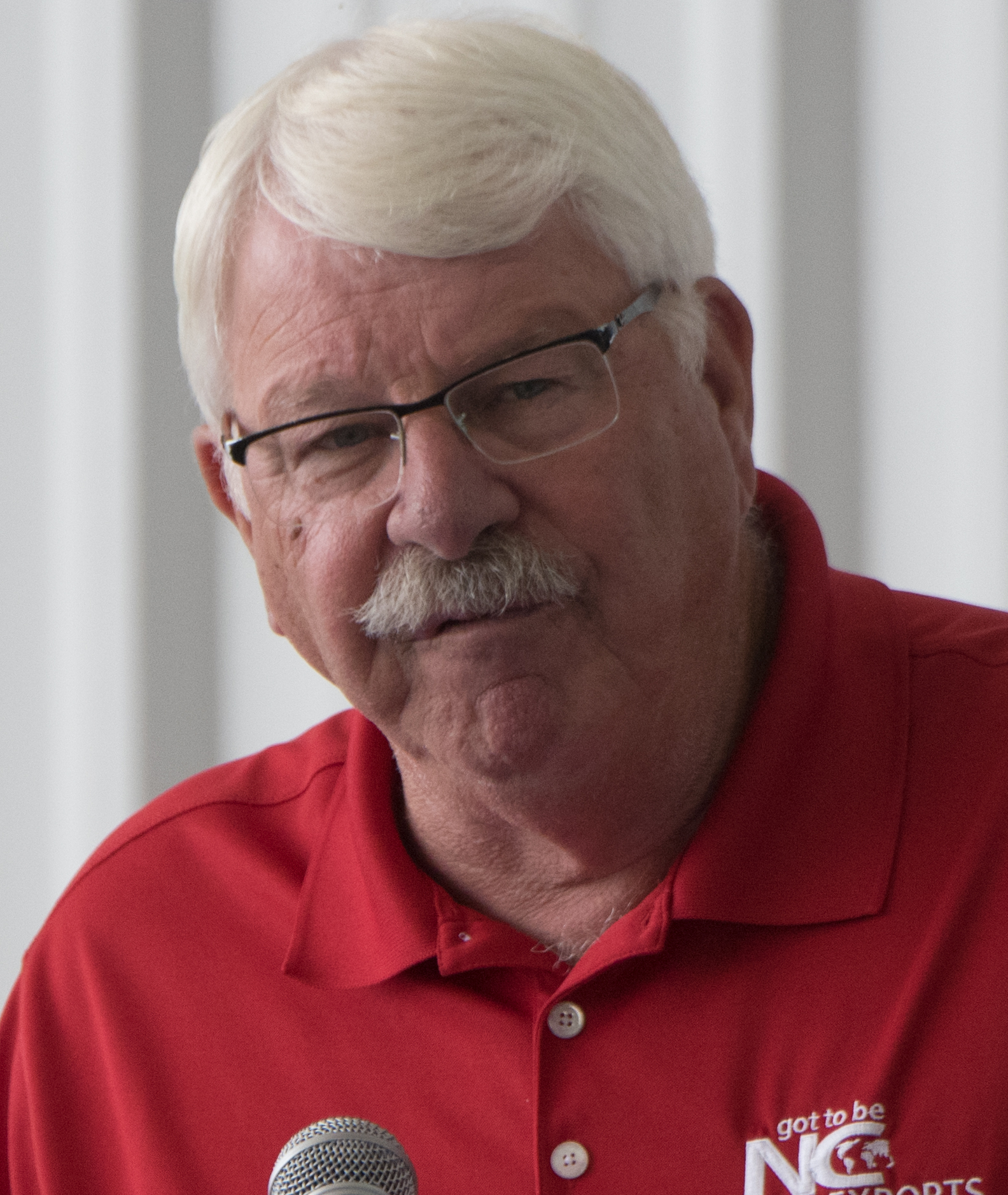
- Incumbent; Steve Troxler since February 8, 2005
- Member of: Council of State
- Term length: Four years, no term limit
- Inaugural holder: Leonidas L. Polk
- Formation: 1877
- Succession: Eighth
- Website: www.ncagr.gov

The Commissioner of Agriculture is a statewide elected office in the U.S. state of North Carolina. The commissioner is a constitutional officer who serves as the head of the state's Department of Agriculture and Consumer Services, which is responsible for promoting agriculture in the state. They are also a member of the Council of State. The incumbent is Steve Troxler, who has served since 2005.

Leonidas L. Polk was the first Commissioner when the office was established in 1877. At the time, the commissioner was appointed by the state Board of Agriculture. In 1899 another act was passed providing that the commissioner, beginning with the general election of 1900, be elected by the people. The office was elevated to constitutional status in 1944.

== History of the office ==
In 1875 the Constitution of North Carolina was amended to allow the North Carolina General Assembly to create an independent Department of Agriculture, Immigration, and Statistics. The assembly created the department in March 1877 under the supervision of a Board of Agriculture and a Commissioner of Agriculture, who was to be appointed by the board. Leonidas L. Polk was named the first commissioner on April 2. The commissionership was weakened by a legislative reorganization of the Department of Agriculture in 1879, which reduced clerical staff and split control of the department between the commissioner, a state chemist, and a state geologist. The office remained weak through the 1890s. In 1899 the General Assembly passed a measure making the commissionership an elective office, and selected an interim commissioner until the following general elections. Samuel L. Patterson appointed by the legislature was subsequently elected to the office in 1900. The commissionership was made a constitutional office in 1944.

While of significant prominence in the early 20th century, the office's political profile diminished over subsequent decades as the importance of agriculture in the state's economy declined. A 1968 constitutional study commission recommended making the governor responsible for the selection of the commissioner to reduce voters' burden by shortening the ballot, but this proposal was disregarded by the General Assembly when it revised the state constitution in 1971. Commissioners have historically won office by large margins in elections. James Allen Graham was the longest-serving agriculture commissioner. Meg Scott Phipps, who took office in 2001, was the first woman to serve as commissioner. The incumbent, Steve Troxler, has served as commissioner since February 8, 2005.

== Powers, duties, and structure ==
Article III, Section 7, of the Constitution of North Carolina stipulates the popular election of the Commissioner of Agriculture every four years. North Carolina is one of 12 states to make this office elective. The office holder is not subject to term limits. In the event of a vacancy in the office, the Governor of North Carolina has the authority to appoint a successor until a candidate is elected at the next general election for members of the General Assembly. Per Article III, Section 8 of the constitution, the commissioner sits on the Council of State. They are eighth in line of succession to the governor.

The Commissioner of Agriculture serves as head of the North Carolina Department of Agriculture and Consumer Services, which is responsible for promoting agriculture in the state and enforcing various health and safety regulations through the implementation of over 75 laws and programs. The commissioner chairs the North Carolina Board of Agriculture, which has statutory authority to adopt rules for the department. The department is split into 20 divisions. As of December 2022, the department has 1,753 employees retained under the terms of the State Human Resources Act. As with all Council of State officers, the commissioner's salary is fixed by the General Assembly and cannot be reduced during their term of office. As of 2025, the commissioner's annual salary is $168,384.

== List of commissioners ==
Commissioners of Agriculture
No.	Commissioner	Term in office	Party	Source
1	Leonidas L. Polk	1877 – 1880	Populist	
2	Montford McGehee	1880 – 1887		
3	John Robinson	1887 – 1895		
4	Samuel L. Patterson	1895 – 1897		
5	James M. Mewborne	1897 – 1898	Populist	
6	John R. Smith	1898 – 1899	Republican	
7	Samuel L. Patterson	1899 – 1908	Democratic	
8	William A. Graham Jr.	1908 – 1923	Democratic	
9	William A. Graham III	1923 – 1937	Democratic	
10	W. Kerr Scott	1937 – 1948	Democratic	
11	David S. Coltrane	1948 – 1949	Democratic	
12	Lynton Y. Ballentine	1949 – 1964	Democratic	
13	James Allen Graham	1964 – 2000	Democratic	
14	Meg Scott Phipps	2001 – 2003	Democratic	
15	Britt Cobb	2003 – 2005	Democratic	
16	Steve Troxler	2005 – present	Republican	

== Works cited ==
- Christensen, Rob (2019). The Rise and Fall of the Branchhead Boys: North Carolina's Scott Family and the Era of Progressive Politics. Chapel Hill: The University of North Carolina Press. ISBN 9781469651057.
- Graham, Jim (1998). The Sodfather: A Friend of Agriculture (PDF). Raleigh: James A. Graham Scholarship Endowment. ISBN 9780963455925.
- Guillory, Ferrel (June 1988). "The Council of State and North Carolina's Long Ballot : A Tradition Hard to Change" (PDF). N.C. Insight. N.C. Center for Public Policy Research. pp. 40–44.
- North Carolina Manual (PDF). Raleigh: North Carolina Department of the Secretary of State. 2011. OCLC 2623953. Archived from the original (PDF) on August 2, 2023.
- Orth, John V.; Newby, Paul M. (2013). The North Carolina State Constitution (second ed.). Oxford University Press. ISBN 9780199300655.
