= 1884 North Carolina gubernatorial election =

- November 4, 1884
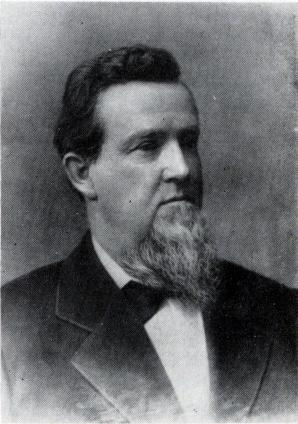

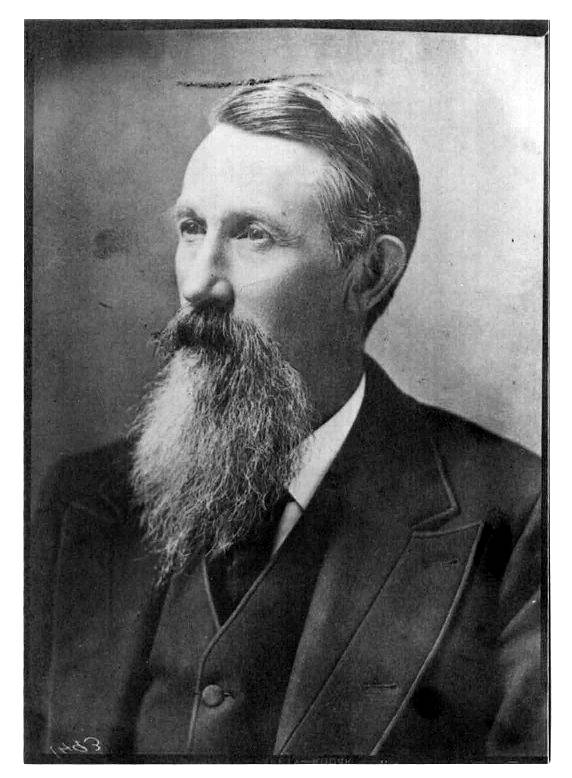
Nominee	Alfred Moore Scales	Tyre York
Party	Democratic	Republican
Popular vote	143,249	122,795
Percentage	53.80%	46.12%
- County results Scales: 50–60% 60–70% 70–80% York: 50–60% 60–70%
Governor before election
Thomas Jordan Jarvis
Democratic
Elected Governor
Alfred Moore Scales
Democratic

The 1884 North Carolina gubernatorial election was held on November 4, 1884. Democratic nominee Alfred Moore Scales defeated Republican nominee Tyre York with 53.80% of the vote.

== Democratic convention ==
The Democratic convention was held on June 25, 1884.

=== Candidates ===
- Alfred Moore Scales, U.S. Representative
- Octavius Coke
- Thomas Michael Holt, State Representative

=== Results ===
Democratic convention results
Party	Candidate	Votes	%
Democratic	Alfred Moore Scales	552	67.73
Democratic	Octavius Coke	240	29.45
Democratic	Thomas Michael Holt	23	2.82
Total votes		815	100.00

== Republican convention ==
The Republican convention was held on May 1, 1884.

=== Candidates ===
- Tyre York, U.S. Representative
- Oliver H. Dockery, former U.S. Representative

=== Results ===
Republican convention results
Party	Candidate	Votes	%
Republican	Tyre York	212	98.61
Republican	Oliver H. Dockery	3	1.40
Total votes		215	100.00

== General election ==
=== Candidates ===
Major party candidates

- Alfred Moore Scales, Democratic
- Tyre York, Republican

Other candidates

- William T. Walker, Independent

=== Results ===
1884 North Carolina gubernatorial election
Party	Candidate	Votes	%	±%
Democratic	Alfred Moore Scales	143,249	53.80%	
Republican	Tyre York	122,795	46.12%	
Independent	William T. Walker	215	0.08%	
Majority		20,454		
Turnout				
Democratic hold		Swing		
