= 1880 North Carolina gubernatorial election =

- November 2, 1880
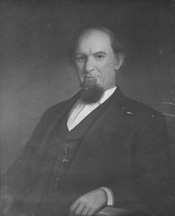

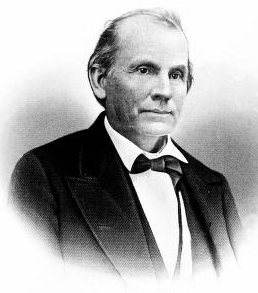
Nominee	Thomas Jordan Jarvis	Ralph P. Buxton
Party	Democratic	Republican
Popular vote	121,837	115,559
Percentage	51.32%	48.68%
- County results Jarvis: 50–60% 60–70% 70–80% 80–90% Buxton: 50–60% 60–70% 70–80% No Data/Vote
Governor before election
Thomas Jordan Jarvis
Democratic
Elected Governor
Thomas Jordan Jarvis
Democratic

The 1880 North Carolina gubernatorial election was held on November 2, 1880. Incumbent Democrat Thomas Jordan Jarvis defeated Republican nominee Ralph P. Buxton with 51.32% of the vote.

== Democratic convention ==
The Democratic convention was held on June 17, 1880.

=== Candidates ===
- Thomas Jordan Jarvis, incumbent governor
- Daniel Gould Fowle, former chairman of the North Carolina Democratic Party
- Alfred Moore Scales, U.S. representative

=== Results ===
Democratic convention results
Party	Candidate	Votes	%
Democratic	Thomas Jordan Jarvis	680	54.93
Democratic	Daniel Gould Fowle	449	36.27
Democratic	Alfred Moore Scales	108	8.72
Total votes		1,238	100.00

== Republican convention ==
The Republican convention was held on July 7, 1880.

=== Candidates ===
- Ralph P. Buxton, Judge of the North Carolina Superior Court
- Oliver H. Dockery, former U.S. Representative

=== Results ===
Republican convention results
Party	Candidate	Votes	%
Republican	Ralph P. Buxton	215	92.67
Republican	Oliver H. Dockery	17	7.33
Total votes		232	100.00

== General election ==
=== Candidates ===
- Thomas Jordan Jarvis, Democratic
- Ralph P. Buxton, Republican

=== Results ===
1880 North Carolina gubernatorial election
Party	Candidate	Votes	%	±%
Democratic	Thomas Jordan Jarvis (incumbent)	121,837	51.32%	
Republican	Ralph P. Buxton	115,559	48.68%	
Majority		6,278		
Turnout				
Democratic hold		Swing		
