= 1888 North Carolina gubernatorial election =

- November 6, 1888
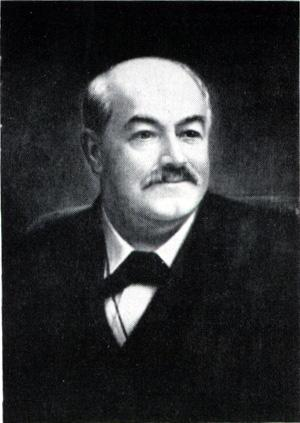

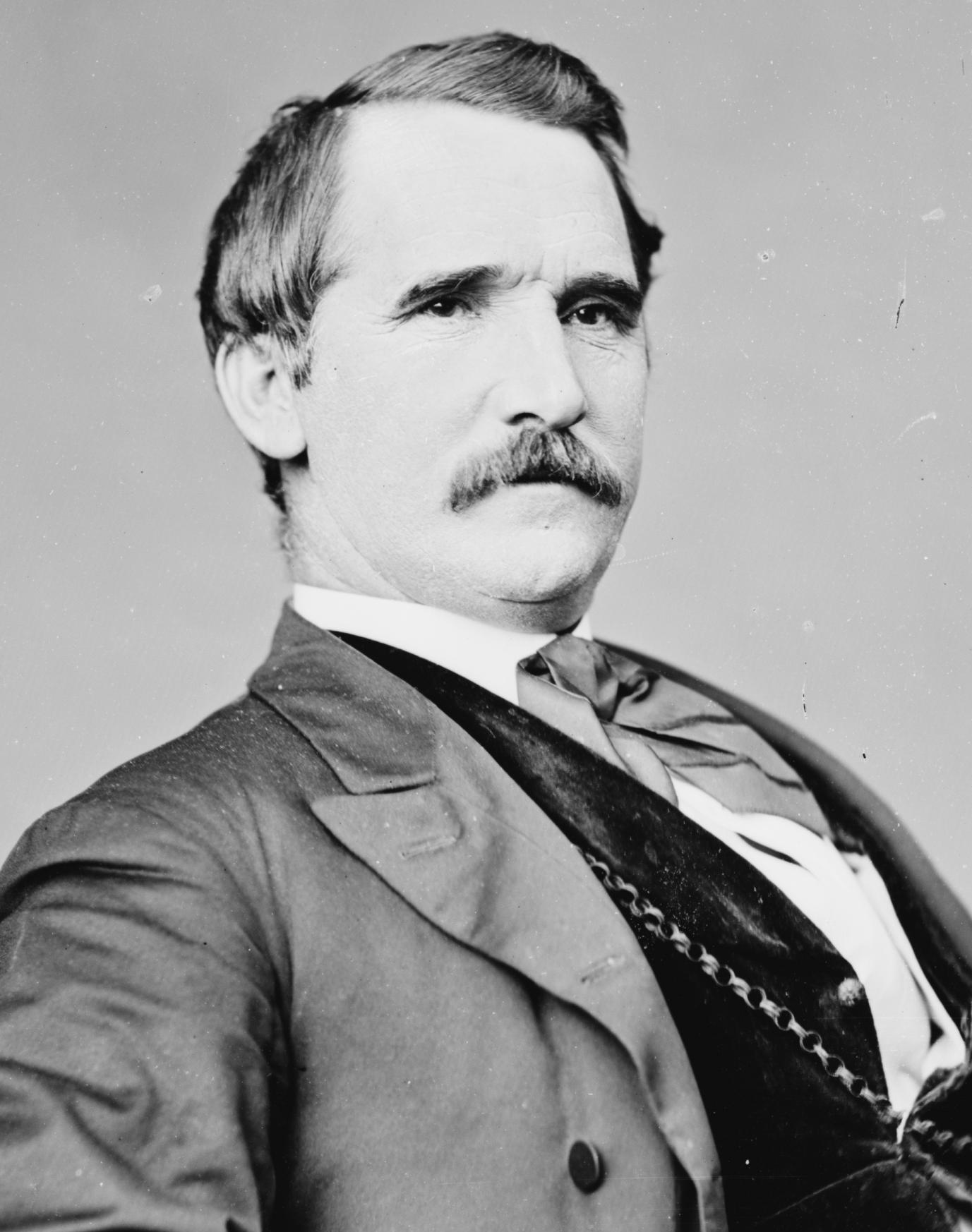
Nominee	Daniel Gould Fowle	Oliver H. Dockery
Party	Democratic	Republican
Popular vote	148,405	134,035
Percentage	51.97%	46.93%
- County results Fowle: 50–60% 60–70% 70–80% Dockery: 40–50% 50–60% 60–70%
Governor before election
Alfred Moore Scales
Democratic
Elected Governor
Daniel Gould Fowle
Democratic

The 1888 North Carolina gubernatorial election was held on November 6, 1888. Democratic nominee Daniel Gould Fowle defeated Republican nominee Oliver H. Dockery with 51.97% of the vote.

== Democratic convention ==
The Democratic convention was held on May 30, 1888.

=== Candidates ===
- Daniel Gould Fowle, former chairman of the North Carolina Democratic Party
- Charles Manly Stedman, incumbent lieutenant governor
- Sydenham Benoni Alexander, state senator
- Robert D. Gilmer
- William H. Kitchin, former U.S. representative
- W.W. Fuller
- Walter Clark, judge of the North Carolina Superior Court
- Richard H. Battle, chairman of the North Carolina Democratic Party
- Risden Tyler Bennett, former U.S. representative

=== Results ===
The results of the balloting were as follows:

	Gubernatorial Ballot																						
	1st	2nd	3rd	4th	5th	6th	7th	8th	9th	10th	11th	12th	13th	14th	15th	16th	17th	18th	19th	20th	21st	22nd	23rd
Fowle	374.64	403	415	417	418	393	380	399	398	370	423	414	404	389	352	393	401	388	399	373	437	449	523.1
Stedman	331.78	326	317	315	325	309	322	313	331	330	313	216	312	351	294	298	326	344	339	336	317	330	435.9
Alexander	245.55	230	228	231	258	258	258	258	230	259	230	327	212	204	203	231	233	228	221	251	205	180	2
Gilmer	8														105	29							
Bennett	1												2										
Battle											11												
Fuller													11										
Kitchin														13									
Clark																8							

Democratic gubernatorial nomination, 23rd ballot
Party	Candidate	Votes	%
Democratic	Daniel Gould Fowle	523.1	54.43
Democratic	Charles Manly Stedman	435.9	45.36
Democratic	Sydenham Benoni Alexander	2	0.21
Total votes		961	100.00

== General election ==
=== Candidates ===
Major party candidates

- Daniel Gould Fowle, Democratic
- Oliver H. Dockery, Republican

Other candidates

- William T. Walker, Prohibition

=== Results ===
1888 North Carolina gubernatorial election
Party	Candidate	Votes	%	±%
Democratic	Daniel Gould Fowle	148,405	51.97%	
Republican	Oliver H. Dockery	134,035	46.93%	
Prohibition	William T. Walker	3,124	1.09%	
Majority		14,370		
Turnout				
Democratic hold		Swing		
