= Louisa Moore Holt =

American political hostess

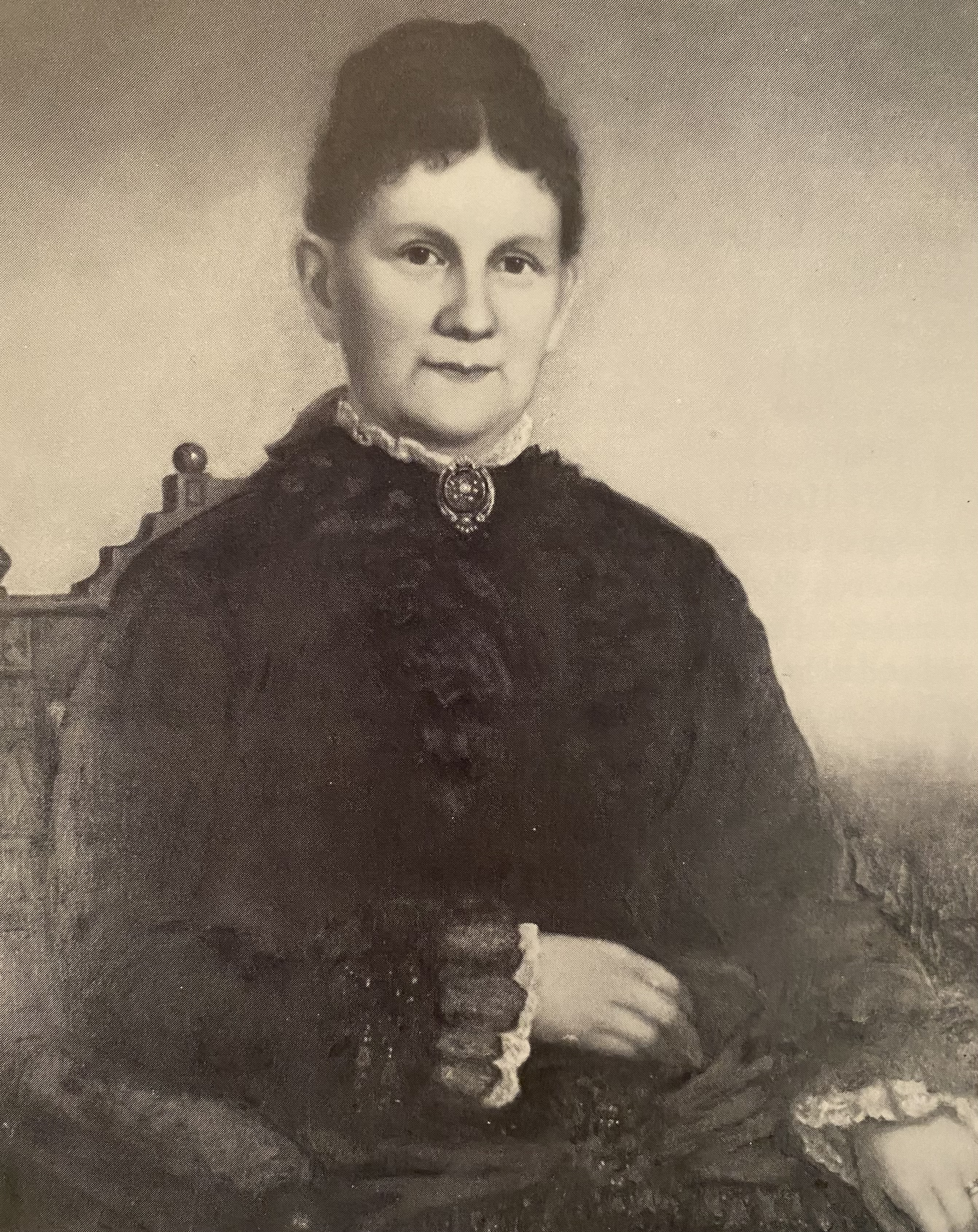

First Lady of North Carolina
- In office April 7, 1891 – January 18, 1893
- Governor: Thomas Michael Holt
- Preceded by: Helen Whitaker Fowle
- Succeeded by: Eleanor Kearny Carr

Second Lady of North Carolina
- In office January 17, 1889 – April 7, 1891
- Governor: Daniel Gould Fowle
- Preceded by: Catherine Defosset Wright Stedman
- Succeeded by: Sue Parks Doughton

Personal details
- Born: October 15, 1833 Caswell County, North Carolina, US
- Died: December 9, 1899 (aged 66) Burlington, North Carolina, US
- Resting place: Linwood Cemetery, Graham, North Carolina
- Party: Democratic
- Spouse: Thomas Michael Holt
- Children: 6
- Parent(s): Samuel Holt; Mary A. Bethel

Louise Matilda Moore Holt (October 15, 1833 – December 9, 1899), also known as Louisa Holt, was an American political hostess who, as the wife of Thomas Michael Holt, served as the Second Lady of North Carolina from 1889 to 1891 and as the First Lady of North Carolina from 1891 to 1893.

== Early life, marriage, and family ==
Holt was born Louise Matilda Moore on October 15, 1833, in Caswell County to Samuel Holt, a wealthy planter, and his wife, Mary A. Bethel Holt. Her parents, who were from Rockingham County, owned Mount Pleasant Plantation.

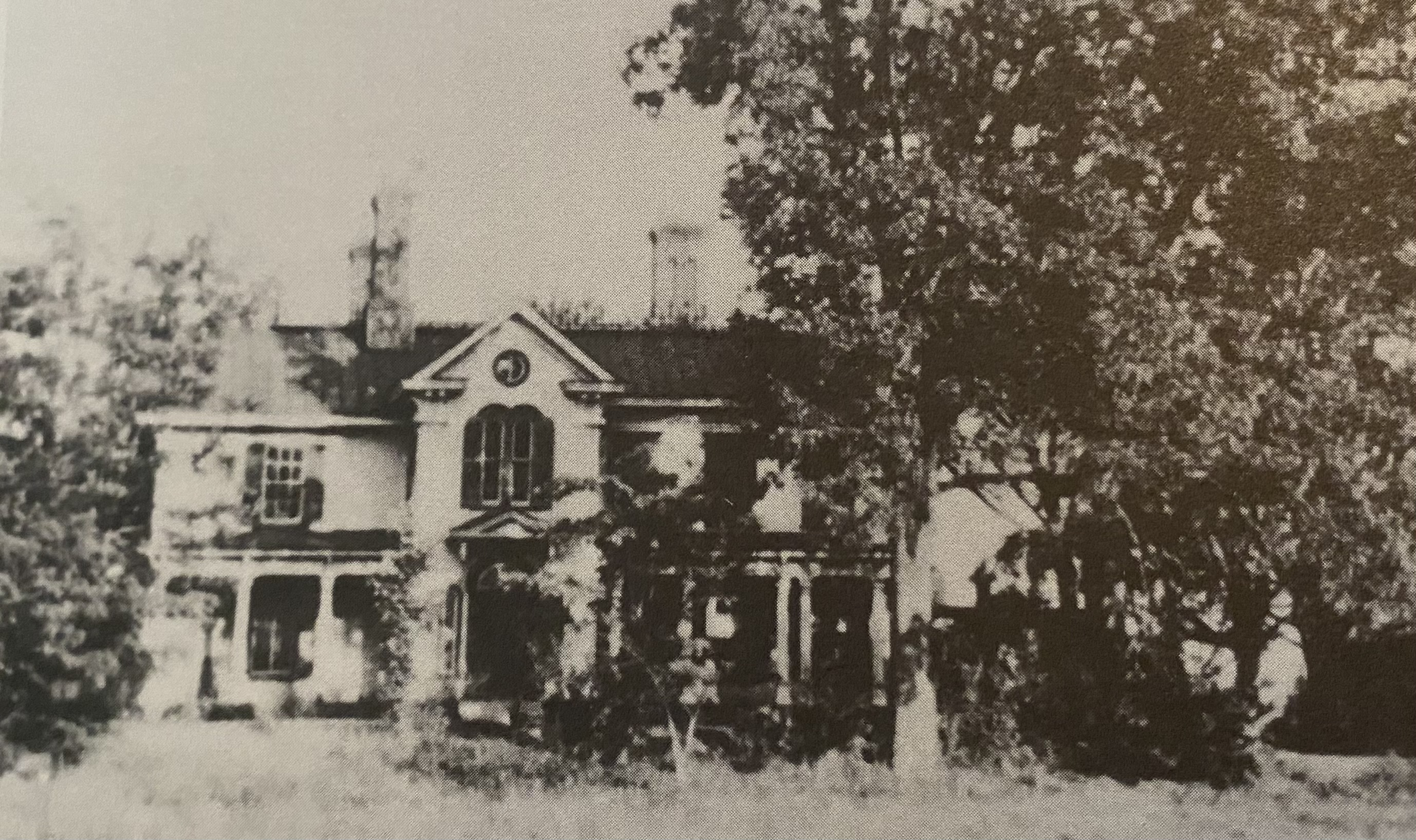
The Holt's estate in Haw River

On October 17, 1855, she married Thomas Michael Holt, a wealthy industrialist, in a ceremony held at her family's plantation. The couple first resided at Lindwood Plantation, the Holt family's estate in Davidson County. They later moved to Haw River, where her husband owned textile mills. The Holts built a large, ornate mansion on their estate that had seven bedrooms, two bathrooms, a connected kitchen, and numerous outbuildings. Their estate included more than four-hundred acres of land which included a lawn, vegetable gardens, forests, and orchards.

Holt gave birth to six children: Alice Linwood Holt in 1856, Charles Thomas Holt in 1858, Cora May Holt in 1859, Louisa "Daisy" Moore in 1861, Ella Moore Holt in 1862, and Thomas Michael Holt Jr. in 1871.

== Public life ==
From 1889 to 1891, Holt's husband served as the Lieutenant Governor of North Carolina, making her the state's Second Lady. During this term, she resided at the family plantation. Holt and her husband arrived in Raleigh on April 9, 1891, following the death of Governor Daniel Gould Fowle, whose body lay in state at the North Carolina State Capitol. Due to the late governor's death, her husband's inauguration as governor was a somber affair. Holt succeeded Helen Whitaker Fowle, the daughter of the late governor, as First Lady of North Carolina.

Holt, as an upper-class woman, had never cooked a meal and delegated household duties and chores at the North Carolina Executive Mansion to servants. She did not particularly enjoy of being a political hostess, and often let other women take on the responsibilities of entertaining. Her daughter, Daisy, often carried out the duties of hostess at the mansion on behalf of her mother.

Holt was doted upon by her husband and enjoyed daily afternoon naps and frequent carriage rides around Blount Street. As her husband suffered from Bright's disease, they often went on medical treatment stays in Philadelphia and Florida. As part of the upper class, they also enjoyed visiting fashionable resorts including Buffalo Lithia Springs.

== Death ==
Holt died of heart failure on December 9, 1899, while visiting her sister in Burlington. She had a simple funeral at the Presbyterian Church in Graham and was buried in Linwood Cemetery, beside her husband and several of their children who predeceased her.
