= Tyre York =

American politician (1836–1916)

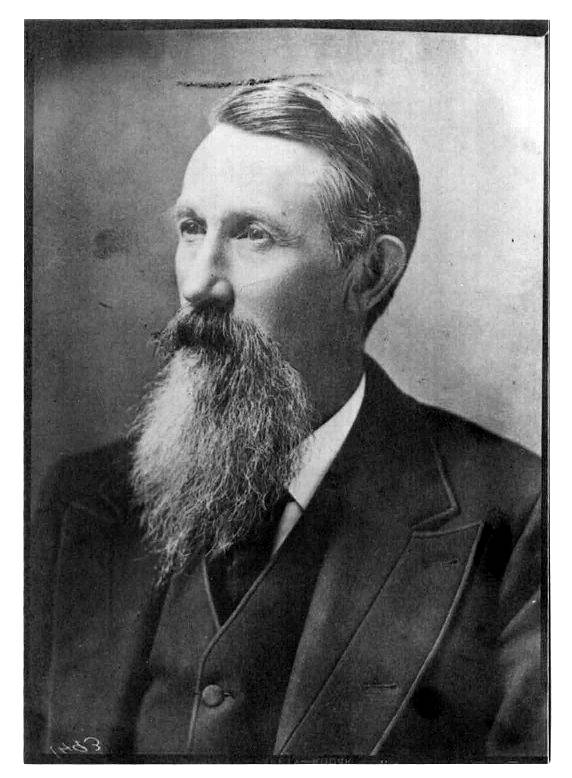

Member of the U.S. House of Representatives from North Carolina's 7th district
- In office March 4, 1883 – March 3, 1885
- Preceded by: Robert Franklin Armfield
- Succeeded by: John S. Henderson

Personal details
- Born: May 4, 1836 Rockford, North Carolina
- Died: January 28, 1916 (aged 79) Traphill, North Carolina
- Party: Liberal Anti-Prohibition (1882–1885); Republican (from 1884); Democratic (before 1882)
- Occupation: Physician, farmer

Tyre Glenn York (May 4, 1836 – January 28, 1916) was a U.S. Congressman from North Carolina between 1883 and 1885. Prior to that he served in the North Carolina House of Representatives and North Carolina Senate.

York, born in Rockford, North Carolina, attended common schools and then the Charleston, South Carolina Medical College. He practiced medicine and farming in Traphill, North Carolina beginning in 1859.

During the American Civil War, York was a surgeon with the Wilkes County Home Guards. In 1865, he was elected to a term in the North Carolina House of Representatives; he served again in 1866 and 1879, in addition to terms in the North Carolina Senate in 1876 and 1881.

In the election of 1882, opponents of the 1881 Prohibition referendum formed a unity ticket with the Republican Party, called the "Liberal Anti-Prohibition" ticket (LAP). York was elected on the LAP ticket to the 48th United States Congress; he served one term and was considered an "Independent Democrat." York did not run again for the U.S. House in 1884, choosing instead to campaign for Governor of North Carolina, running on a fusion ticket of Liberals and Republicans. He lost. When the returns were canvassed, 215 votes in Robeson County were recorded for a local citizen named "Tyler York" rather than for Tyre York. After the 1884 election, Rep. York retired to his home in Traphill, though he served one term in the North Carolina House in 1887. He died on his farm in 1916 and is buried in the Traphill Cemetery.

== Electoral history ==
U.S. House Election, NC-07, July 11, 1882
| Tyre York (LAP) | 11,435 | 48.6% |
| William M. Robbins (D) | 11,165 | 47.5 |
| Columbus L. Cook (G) | 924 | 3.9 |
| Robert F. Armfield (D write-in*) | 2 | 0.0 |

NC Governor Election, April 11, 1884
| Alfred M. Scales (D) | 143,249 | 53.8% |
| Tyre York (R/L) | 122,795 | 46.1 |
| Tyler York (I) | 215 | 0.1 |
| Scattering write-in | 3 | 0.0 |

== Notes ==
Party political offices
| Preceded by Ralph P. Buxton | Republican nominee for Governor of North Carolina; 1884 | Succeeded by Oliver H. Dockery |
U.S. House of Representatives
| Preceded by Robert F. Armfield | Member of the U.S. House of Representatives from North Carolina's 7th congressional district 1883–1885 | Succeeded by John S. Henderson |
