= William M. Robbins =

American politician (1828–1905)

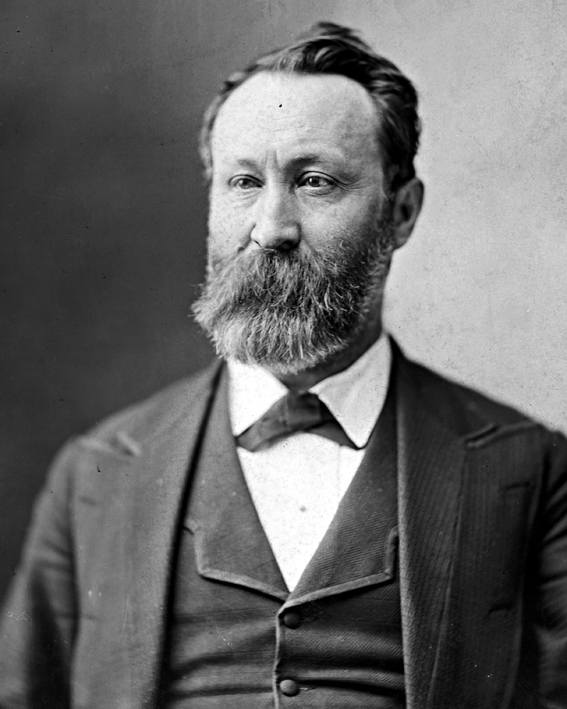
- Portrait of Robbins by Mathew Brady, taken between 1865 and 1880

Member of the U.S. House of Representatives from North Carolina's 7th district
- In office March 4, 1873 – March 3, 1879
- Preceded by: James C. Harper
- Succeeded by: Robert Franklin Armfield

Member of the North Carolina Senate
- In office 1868–1872

Personal details
- Born: William McKendree Robbins; October 26, 1828 Trinity, North Carolina, US
- Died: May 5, 1905 (aged 76) Salisbury, North Carolina, US
- Party: Democratic
- Relations: Lucius Quintus Cincinnatus Lamar I (cousin); Mirabeau B. Lamar (cousin); Lucius Quintus Cincinnatus Lamar (cousin); Joseph Rucker Lamar (cousin); James M. Leach (uncle); Gaston A. Robbins (nephew); Benjamin Franklin Long (son-in-law)
- Occupation: Politician, lawyer, military officer

Military service
- Allegiance: Confederate States of America
- Branch/service: Confederate States Army
- Rank: Major
- Unit: 167th Infantry Regiment
- Battles/wars: American Civil War; First Battle of Bull Run; Seven Days Battles; Battle of Gettysburg; Battle of the Wilderness; Battle of Appomattox Court House

William McKendree Robbins (October 26, 1828 – May 5, 1905) was an American politician, lawyer, and military officer. A Democrat, he was a member of the United States House of Representatives from North Carolina.

Born in Trinity, North Carolina, Robbins studied at Randolph–Macon College. He became a lawyer. During the American Civil War, he fought in the Confederate States Army. He served in the North Carolina Senate, then served in Congress from 1873 to 1879. Politically, he was conservative.

== Early life and education ==
Robbins was born on October 26, 1828, near Trinity, North Carolina, the son of Ahi Robbins and Mary Brown (née Leach) Robbins. He was the third cousin of Lucius Quintus Cincinnatus Lamar I and Mirabeau B. Lamar, and the fourth cousin of Lucius Quintus Cincinnatus Lamar and Joseph Rucker Lamar. Through his mother, he was the nephew of James M. Leach.

Robbins was educated at local subscription schools and academies. He studied classics, attending Randolph–Macon College for two years before graduating in 1851.

== Career ==
For one or two years, Robbins taught language and mathematics at Trinity College. He taught at the University of Alabama, at times teaching history, literature, and mathematics. In 1855, he moved to Glenville, where he founded a women's college. He later left the college and practiced law in Selma. However, the Biographical Directory of the United States Congress claims he read law and was admitted to the bar in 1854, commencing practice in Eufaula the same year.

During the American Civil War, Robbins served in the Confederate States Army. In January and February 1861, he served as a private into the Marion Rifles and was stationed between Fort Gaines and Fort Morgan. In March, he joined the 167th Infantry Regiment as a first lieutenant in Company G, under James Longstreet. On April 18, as his first duty, he travelled to Fort Sumter to retreige weaponry. He fought in Tennessee and Virginia, participating in the First Battle of Bull Run, the Seven Days Battles, the Battle of Gettysburg, the Battle of the Wilderness, and the Battle of Appomattox Court House, among other conflicts. At the Battle of the Wilderness, he received a severe head wound. He achieved the rank of major.

After the war, Robbins returned to North Carolina due to African Americans holding major political power where he lived in Alabama. In December 1865, he moved to Salisbury, North Carolina, practicing law there. In February 1873, he moved to Statesville.

Robbins was a Democrat. He was a member of the North Carolina Senate from 1868 to 1872. He was possibly elected for another term in 1879. In the House, he pushed greatly for municipal bonds and supported the impeachment of William Woods Holden.

Robbins was a member of the United States House of Representatives from March 4, 1873, to March 3, 1879, representing North Carolina's 7th district. While in the House, he was chairman of the Committee on Expenditures in the Department of War and a member of the Committee on Ways and Means. Politically, he was conservative, supporting prohibition and opposing black suffrage. However, Keith T. Poole claims Robbins was liberal.

In 1878, Robbins entered a law partnership with his son-in-law, Benjamin Franklin Long, and practiced in Statesville. During the Second presidency of Grover Cleveland, he was offered the roles of Ambassadors of the United States to Mexico and general-consul to Havana, both of which he declined. In 1894, President Grover Cleveland appointed him to the Gettysburg Battlefield Memorial Association, which he served on until his death.

== Personal life and death ==
On September 7, 1854, Robbins married Mary Montgomery (died 1858), with whom he had two children. During the war, he married her sister, Martha Montgomery, with whom he had three children. He was a member of the Methodist Episcopal Church, South, though converted to Presbyterianism in his later life, due to the Methodist church fighting to regain its property from the United States government after the war.

Robbins died on May 5, 1905, aged 76, in Salisbury, from an illness in the stomach. He was buried at Oakwood Cemetery, in Statesville. He was the uncle of Gaston A. Robbins.

U.S. House of Representatives
Preceded by James C. Harper	Member of the U.S. House of Representatives from North Carolina's 7th congressional district 1873–1879	Succeeded by Robert F. Armfield
