= Israel G. Lash =

American politician

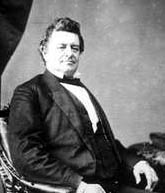

Member of the U.S. House of Representatives from North Carolina's 5th district
- In office July 20, 1868 – March 3, 1871
- Preceded by: Civil War
- Succeeded by: James M. Leach

Personal details
- Born: Israel George Lash; August 18, 1810 near Bethania, North Carolina, U.S.
- Died: April 1, 1878 (aged 67) Salem, North Carolina, U.S.
- Resting place: Moravian Cemetery
- Party: Republican
- Occupation: cigar manufacturing

Israel George Lash (August 18, 1810 – April 1, 1878) was an American businessman and politician who served two terms as a U.S. representative from North Carolina from 1868 to 1871.

== Early life and education ==
Born in Bethania, North Carolina, August 18, 1810, Lash attended the common schools and the local academy in his native city.

== Career ==
He engaged in mercantile pursuits and subsequently became a cigar manufacturer. He also engaged in banking in Salem, North Carolina.

== Political career ==
He was a delegate to the State constitutional convention in 1868. Upon the readmission of the State of North Carolina to representation he was elected as a Republican to the Fortieth Congress. He was reelected to the Forty-first Congress and served from July 20, 1868, to March 3, 1871. He was not a candidate for renomination in 1870.

== Later career and death ==
After leaving Congress, he again engaged in banking in Salem (now Winston-Salem) N.C., until his death there on April 1, 1878.

His interment was in the Moravian Cemetery, Bethania, N.C.

== Slaveholder ==
Lash owned at least thirty enslaved people in Forsyth County, North Carolina.

== See also ==
- 40th United States Congress
- 41st United States Congress

U.S. House of Representatives
Preceded by Civil War	Member of the U.S. House of Representatives from North Carolina's 5th congressional district 1868–1871	Succeeded by James M. Leach
