= James L. Robinson =

American politician (1838–1887)

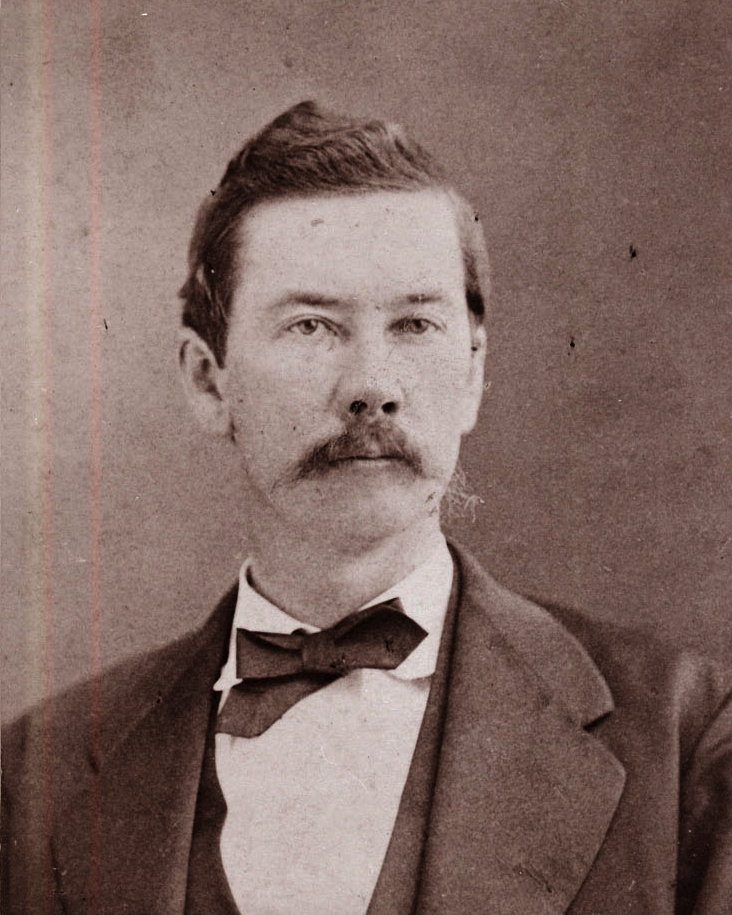

4th Lieutenant Governor of North Carolina
- In office February 5, 1879 – October 31, 1884
- Governor: Thomas J. Jarvis
- Preceded by: Thomas J. Jarvis
- Succeeded by: Charles M. Stedman

Member of the North Carolina Senate from the 42nd district
- In office November 20, 1876 – January 5, 1881
- Preceded by: James R. Love
- Succeeded by: Burton K. Dickey

Speaker of the North Carolina House of Representatives
- In office November 18, 1872 – November 20, 1876
- Preceded by: Thomas J. Jarvis
- Succeeded by: Charles Price

Member of the North Carolina House of Representatives for Macon
- In office January 7, 1885 – January 5, 1887
- Preceded by: J. Frank Ray
- Succeeded by: W. N. Allman
- In office November 16, 1868 – November 20, 1876
- Preceded by: J. G. Crawford (as Member, House of Commons)
- Succeeded by: G. N. Rush

Personal details
- Born: James Lowry Robinson; September 17, 1838 Franklin, North Carolina, U.S.
- Died: July 11, 1887 (aged 48) Franklin, North Carolina, U.S.
- Party: Democratic
- Spouse: Alice Louisa Siler

Military service
- Allegiance: Confederate States
- Branch/service: Confederate States Army
- Years of service: 1861–1863
- Battles/wars: American Civil War: Battle of Seven Pines (WIA)

James Lowry Robinson (September 17, 1838 – July 11, 1887) was a Democratic politician from the U.S. state of North Carolina; he served as the fourth lieutenant governor of the state for four years under Governor Thomas J. Jarvis and as acting Governor of North Carolina for one month in 1883. Earlier in his political career he served in the North Carolina House of Representatives, including as Speaker, and then the North Carolina Senate.

== Early life ==
Robinson was born and raised in Franklin, North Carolina; he served in the North Carolina militia during the American Civil War and was wounded at the Battle of Seven Pines. Robinson left the military in 1863 and opened a general store in Macon County.

== Politics ==
Robinson was first elected to public office in 1868, when he was chosen to represent Macon County in the North Carolina House of Representatives. He served there until 1875, the last three years as House Speaker. Robinson then moved up to the state senate, where he served three terms between 1876 and 1880, including one as Senate President Pro Tempore.

As president pro tempore, Robinson became (unofficially) acting lieutenant governor in 1879, after Thomas Jordan Jarvis's succession to the governorship. He was elected Lt. Governor is his own right in the 1880 election on the Democratic ticket with Jarvis. Robinson served as acting Governor of North Carolina for four weeks in September 1883 when Governor Jarvis left the state for an extended period to attend an exhibition. The most notable events of his administration were two official pardons granted to prisoners, one to a dying Cherokee man, and one to a murderer who Robinson judged acted in self-defense. Robinson resigned as the lieutenant governor on October 31, 1884 in order to be a candidate for the state house. He was elected to the state house from Macon County and served in the legislature of 1885.

== Later life and death ==
After his term in the state house, Robinson suffered from financial difficulties. The Raleigh News and Observer reported on November 6, 1887 that Robinson was deathly ill and was being treated by a doctor from Asheville. Robinson died later in the year, according to a list of North Carolinians who died in 1887 listed in the Fayetteville Observer on January 19, 1888.

The town of Robbinsville, North Carolina is thought to be named in his honor.

== See also ==
- North Carolina General Assembly of 1868–1869

Party political offices
Preceded by Thomas J. Jarvis	Democratic nominee for Lieutenant Governor of North Carolina; 1880	Succeeded by Charles Manly Stedman
Political offices
Preceded by Thomas J. Jarvis	Lieutenant Governor of North Carolina; 1879–1885 (Acting until Jan. 1881)	Succeeded by Charles M. Stedman
