= Clinton A. Cilley =

American judge

Clinton Albert Cilley
- Born: February 16, 1837; Rockingham County, New Hampshire
- Died: May 9, 1900 (aged 63); North Carolina
- Burial place: Oakwood Cemetery, Hickory, North Carolina
- Education: Harvard College (1859)
- Military career
- Allegiance: United States of America
- Branch: United States Army
- Service years: 1861–1866
- Rank: Major; Brevet Colonel
- Unit: 2nd Regiment Minnesota Volunteer Infantry
- Conflicts: American Civil War: Battle of Chickamauga
- Awards: Medal of Honor
- Other work: lawyer, judge, politician

Clinton Albert Cilley (February 16, 1837 – May 9, 1900) was a North Carolina lawyer and judge, and a recipient of the Medal of Honor for his actions as an officer in the Union Army at the Battle of Chickamauga in the American Civil War.

== Biography ==
Cilley joined the 2nd Minnesota Infantry as a sergeant in June 1861, and was commissioned as a second lieutenant six months later. He mustered out in September 1866 with the rank of major and a brevet (honorary promotion) to the rank of colonel.

Cilley moved to western North Carolina at the end of the Civil War and became regional administrator for the Freedmens Bureau. Although he was essentially a carpetbagger, Cilley became very popular as a lawyer in Lenoir, North Carolina, where he was elected one of the town's first mayors. He married Emma Harper, daughter of Congressman James C. Harper.

In 1890, he joined the New Hampshire Society of the Sons of the American Revolution. He was assigned national membership number 7521 and state society number 21.

He died May 9, 1900, and is buried in Oakwood Cemetery in Hickory, North Carolina. His grave can be found in Section 2-E, Row 2.

== Honors ==
The Catawba County Museum of History contains the Clinton Cilley Collection of Civil War artifacts.

== Medal of Honor citation ==
Rank and organization: Captain, Company C, 2d Minnesota Infantry. Place and date: At Chickamauga, Ga., September 20, 1863. Entered service at: Wasioja, Minn. Birth: Rockingham County, N.H. Date of issue: June 12, 1895.

Citation:

Seized the colors of a retreating regiment and led it into the thick of the attack.

== See also ==
- List of Medal of Honor recipients
- List of American Civil War Medal of Honor recipients: A–F § C
