= Mary Woodson Jarvis =

First Lady of North Carolina (1879–1885)

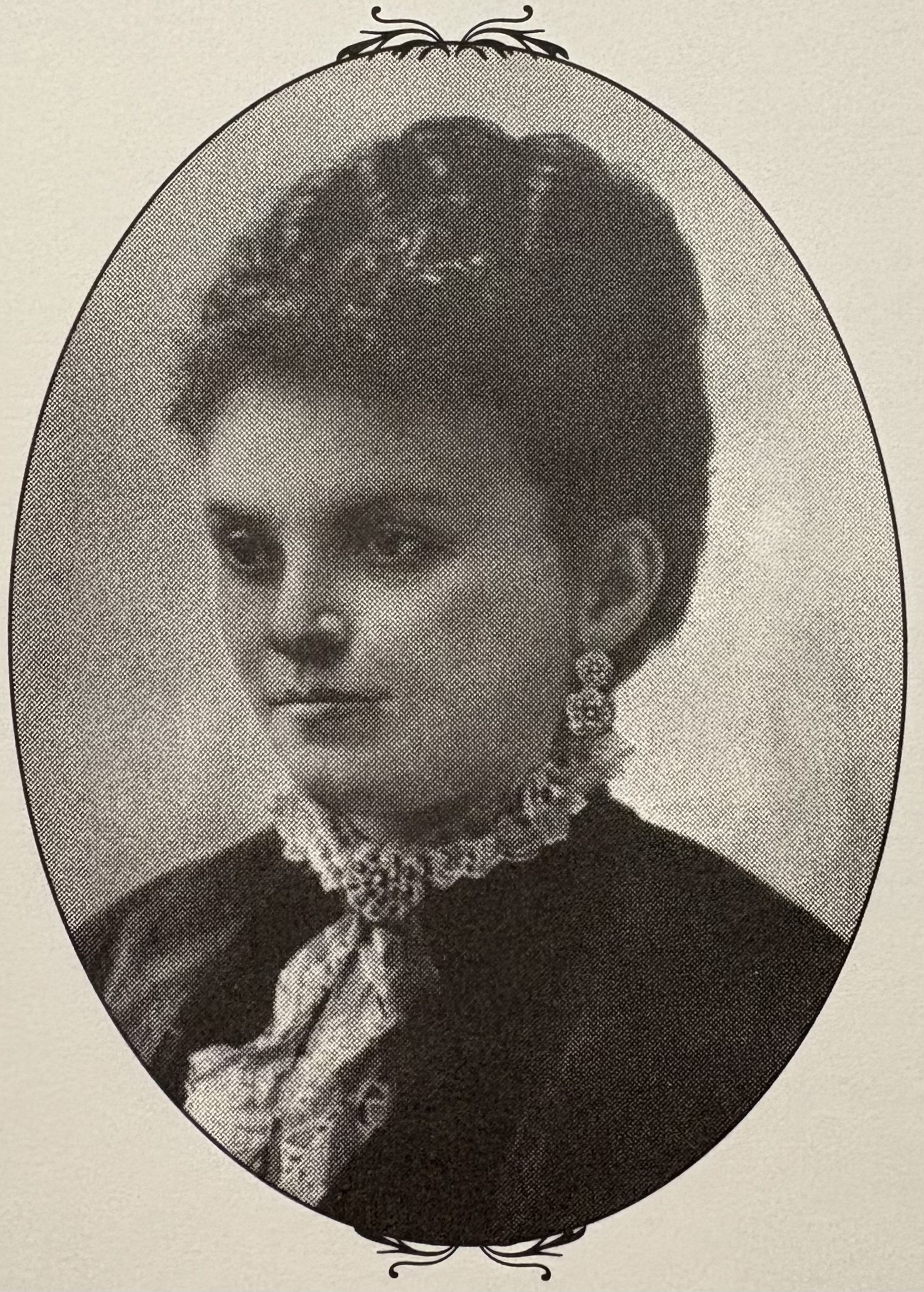

First Lady of North Carolina
- In role February 5, 1879 – January 21, 1885
- Governor: Thomas J. Jarvis
- Preceded by: Harriett Newell Espy Vance
- Succeeded by: Catherine Bullock Henderson Scales

Second Lady of North Carolina
- In role January 1, 1877 – February 5, 1879
- Governor: Zebulon Vance
- Lieutenant Governor: Thomas J. Jarvis
- Preceded by: vacant
- Succeeded by: Alice Louisa Siler Robinson

Personal details
- Born: Mary Woodson; December 12, 1842
- Died: February 22, 1924 (aged 81) Greenville, North Carolina, U.S.
- Resting place: Cherry Hill Cemetery
- Party: Democratic
- Spouse: Thomas J. Jarvis
- Occupation: writer

Mary Woodson Jarvis (December 12, 1842 – February 22, 1924) was an American white supremacist, writer, and civic leader who, as the wife of Thomas J. Jarvis, served as the Second Lady of North Carolina from 1877 to 1879 and as the First Lady of North Carolina from 1879 to 1885. She was an active member of the North Carolina Division of the United Daughters of the Confederacy, serving as president of the George B. Singletary Chapter from 1899 to 1916. A promotor of the pseudo-historical Lost Cause of the Confederacy, she authored the book The Ku-Klux Klans, and the booklet The Conditions that Led to the Ku Klux Klans, which glorified the Ku-Klux Klan and condoned the Klan's use of terror against African-Americans in North Carolina.

== Biography ==
Jarvis was born Mary Woodson on December 12, 1842. She was the daughter of John Woodson, a judge from Goochland County, Virginia.

In 1874, she married Thomas J. Jarvis, the former Speaker of the North Carolina House of Representatives. They had no children. Her husband served as North Carolina's third lieutenant governor from January 1, 1877 to February 5, 1879, during which time she was the state's second lady. From February 5, 1879 to January 21, 1885, she served as the first lady of North Carolina, during her husband's term as governor.

In 1899, Jarvis founded the George B. Singletary Chapter of the United Daughters of the Confederacy in Greenville, North Carolina and served as chapter president from 1899 to 1916. During her time as president, the chapter unveiled a Confederate monument at the Pitt County Courthouse. She also served as president of the Ladies’ Memorial Association of Beaufort County.

On April 10, 1902, Jarvis published the pseudo-historical booklet The Conditions that Led to the Ku Klux Klans. She also authored the book The Ku-Klux Klans. In her work, Jarvis glorified white supremacy and the condoned the Ku-Klux Klan's use of terror and violence against African-Americans in North Carolina while demonizing militant abolitionist organizations, particularly the movement started by John Brown.

She died on February 22, 1924, in Greenville and was buried in Cherry Hill Cemetery.
