= Helen Whitaker Fowle Knight =

First Lady of North Carolina

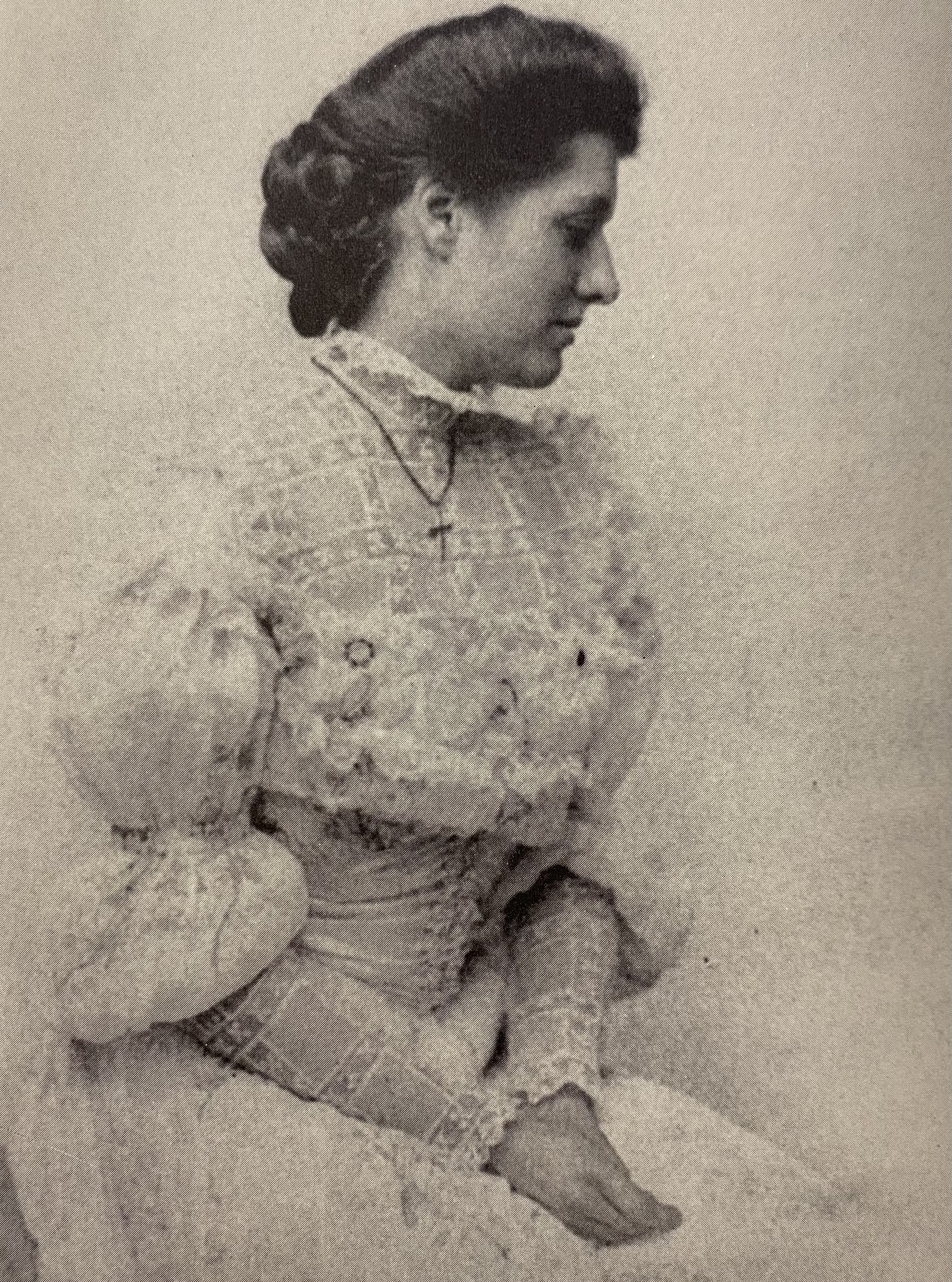

Acting First Lady of North Carolina
- In role January 17, 1889 – April 7, 1891
- Governor: Daniel Gould Fowle
- Preceded by: Catherine Bullock Henderson Scales
- Succeeded by: Louisa Matilda Moore Holt

Personal details
- Born: Helen Whitaker Fowle; June 14, 1869 Raleigh, North Carolina, U.S.
- Died: May 4, 1948 (aged 78) Chicago, Illinois, U.S.
- Resting place: Cave Hill Cemetery; Louisville, Kentucky, U.S.
- Party: Democratic
- Spouse: Thomas Duerson Knight (m. 1891)
- Children: 2, including Duerson Knight
- Parent(s): Daniel Gould Fowle; Mary Eagles Haywood
- Education: Saint Mary's School

Helen Whitaker Fowle Knight (June 14, 1869 – May 4, 1948) was an American political hostess. When her widowed father, Daniel Gould Fowle, became Governor of North Carolina in 1889, she served as the state's First Lady. She was the first North Carolinian first lady to live in the North Carolina Executive Mansion.

== Early life and education ==
Knight was born Helen Whitaker Fowle in Raleigh, North Carolina on June 14, 1869, to Lieutenant-Colonel Daniel Gould Fowle, a Confederate officer and member of the North Carolina General Assembly, and his second wife, Mary Eagles Haywood. Her paternal grandfather, Samuel Richardson Fowle of Woburn, came from a prominent Massachusetts family. Through her father, she was related to colonial printers Daniel Fowle and Zechariah Fowle and the civil engineer James Fowle Baldwin. She was a great-granddaughter of John Haywood of Haywood Hall, who served as North Carolina State Treasurer, and a great-great-granddaughter of John Pugh Williams, a veteran of the American Revolutionary War.

In 1886, Fowle's mother died and her older brother, Fabius Haywood Fowle, was killed in a hunting accident. She was educated at Saint Mary's School in Raleigh.

== Adult life and career ==
When her father was elected Governor of North Carolina, Knight assumed the role of First Lady of North Carolina. Her father was inaugurated on January 17, 1889. Knight took on the role of hostess during the inaugural festivities, and many of her friends attended the events. W.H. Anthony, Chief Marshal of the Inaugural Reception, presented his regalia to Knight. Her two older half-sisters, Margaret Fowle Andrews and Martha Fowle Avera, from the governor's first marriage to Ellen Brent Pearson, also attended the ceremonies. An article in The News & Observer covering the inauguration noted that, "Miss Helen Fowle, in white plush, silver brocade and diamonds, was the favorite of the ball and was indeed a poem of beauty, grace and loveliness."

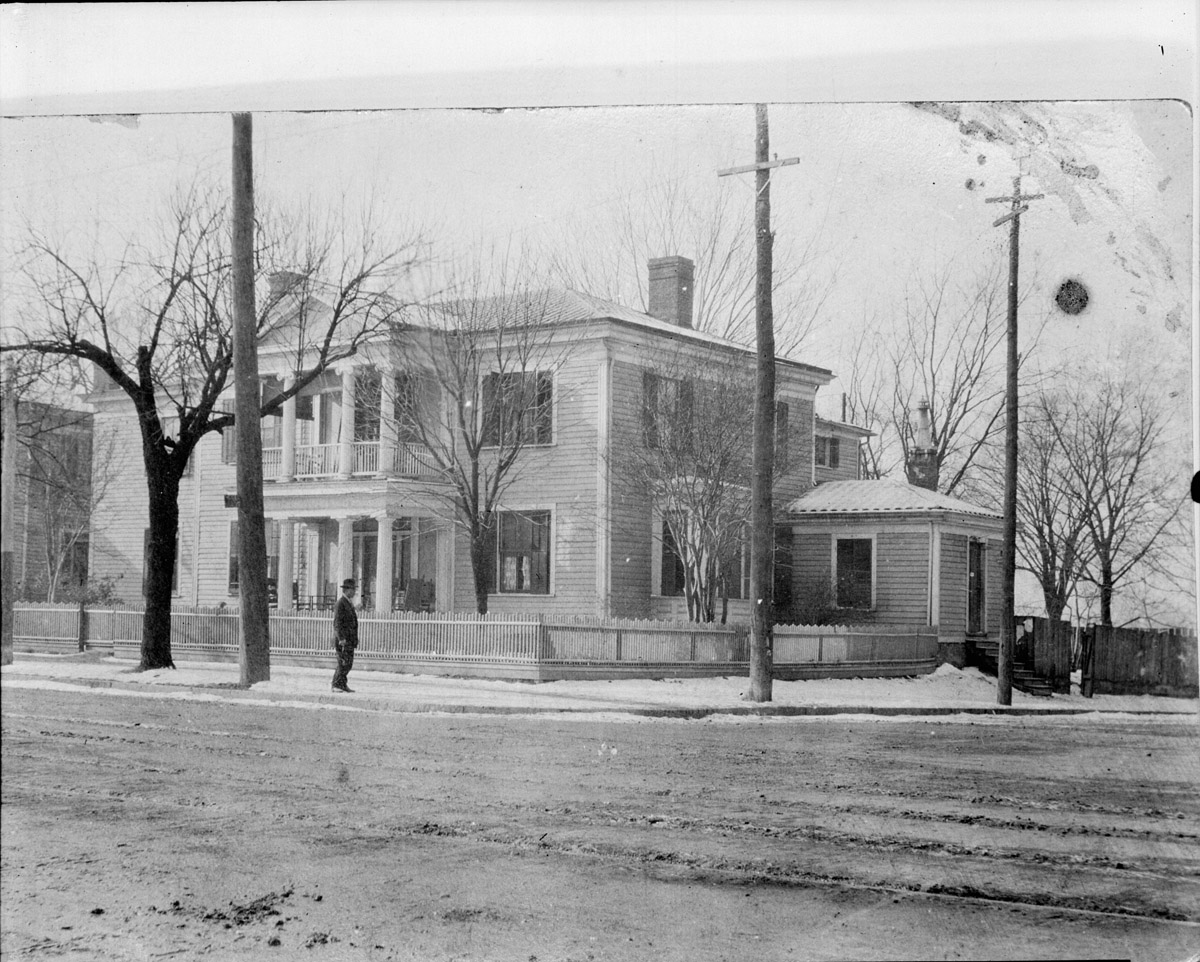
The Fowle family home in downtown Raleigh

Since the North Carolina Executive Mansion was still under construction when the Fowles assumed office, they continued to live in their family home on the future site of the Sir Walter Hotel. Governor Fowle believed the mansion would never be finished were it to remain unoccupied, so he and Knight, and her two younger siblings, Mary Elizabeth Fowle and Daniel Gould Fowle Jr., moved into the unfinished residence on January 5, 1891. On January 13, 1891, Knight hosted an elegant reception at the mansion as its first official hostess. Her time as first lady was short, as her father died of heart failure at the executive mansion on April 7, 1891. She and her sisters carried out the duties of hostess during the funeral, held at First Presbyterian Church.

After her father's death, Knight remained in Raleigh, where she married Thomas Duerson Knight on July 22, 1891. She and her husband moved to Chicago, where her husband served as an assistant state attorney. She gave birth to two sons; the first son was Duerson Knight, was a flying ace in World War I and the second died in infancy.

== Death ==
Knight died of heart failure in Chicago on May 4, 1948. She is buried in her husband's family's plot at Cave Hill Cemetery in Louisville, Kentucky.
