= John Motley Morehead II =

American politician and businessman (1866–1923)

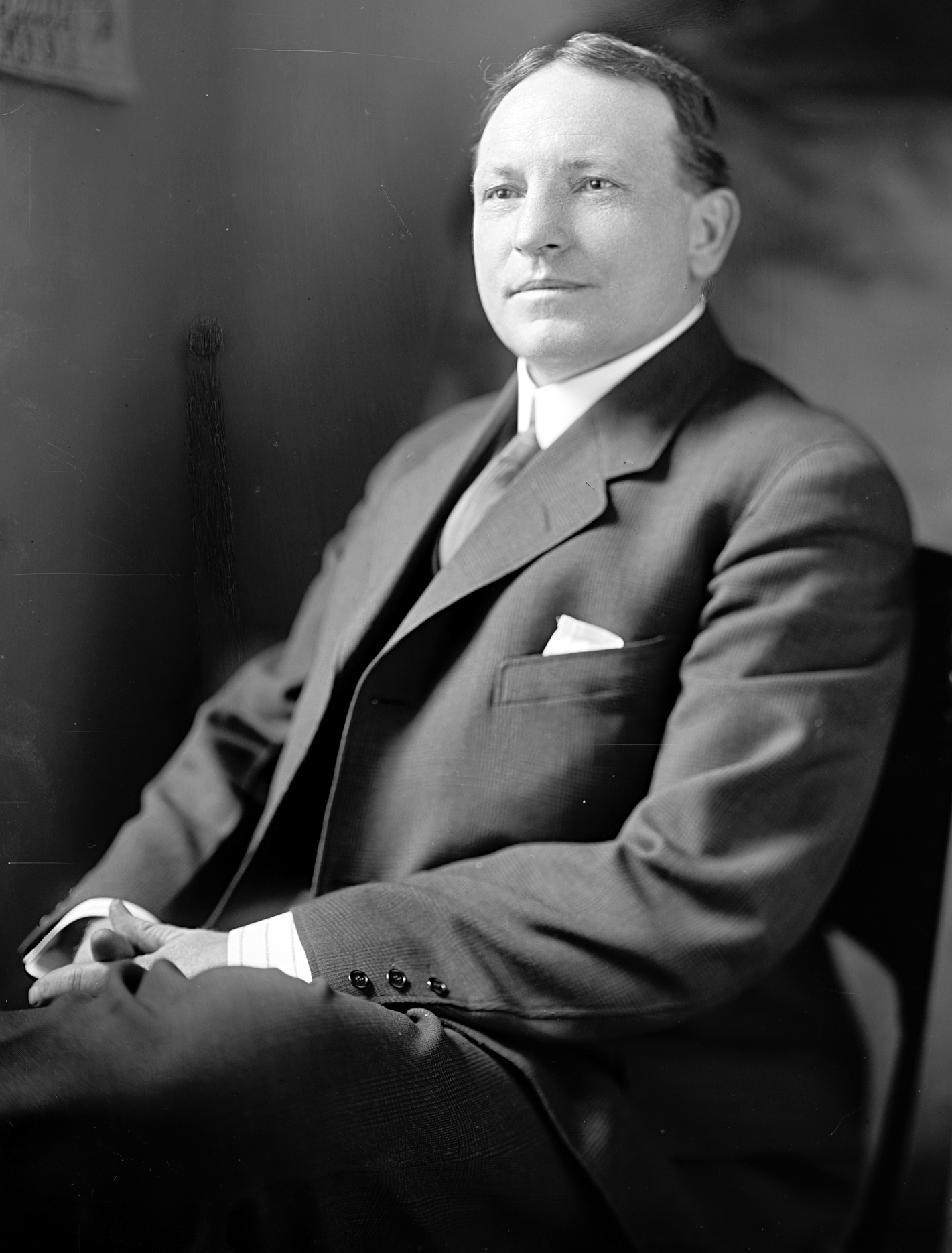
- Harris & Ewing portrait of Morehead, taken between 1905 and 1923

Member of the U.S. House of Representatives from North Carolina's 5th district
- In office March 4, 1909 – March 3, 1911
- Preceded by: William W. Kitchin
- Succeeded by: Charles M. Stedman

Chairman of the North Carolina Republican Party
- In office August 17, 1910 – 1916

Personal details
- Born: July 20, 1866 Charlotte, North Carolina, US
- Died: December 13, 1923 (aged 57) Charlotte, North Carolina, US
- Party: Democratic (until 1908); Republican (from 1908)
- Children: 3, including John
- Occupation: Politician, businessman

John Motley Morehead II (July 20, 1866 – December 13, 1923) was an American politician and businessman. A Republican, he was a member of the United States House of Representatives from North Carolina.

== Early life and education ==
Morehead was born on July 20, 1866, in Charlotte, North Carolina, one of four children born to John Lindsay Morehead and Sarah (née Phifer) Morehead. His grandfathers were John Motley Morehead I and William Fulenwider Phifer.

Educated at public schools, he attended the Bingham Military School and studied at the University of North Carolina at Chapel Hill, graduating from the latter in 1886 with a Bachelor of Arts. He also completed a business course at Bryant & Stratton College. He lived in Spray.

== Career ==
For two years, Morehead was the collecting teller of the First National Bank of Charlotte, then for the following two years was a tobacco merchant in Durham. He also had interests in the agricultural and manufacturing industries. In 1893 or 1894, he founded the James T. Morehead Company, a textile manufacturer created in the aftermath of the James T. Morehead Company, a compant owned by his father and uncle. Until 1908, Morehead was a Democrat, afterwards being a Republican. He was a member of the United States House of Representatives, from March 4, 1909, to March 3, 1911, representing North Carolina's 5th district. He refused to run for the following election. He was an unsuccessful candidate in the 1918 United States Senate election in North Carolina.

From August 17, 1910, to 1916, Morehead was chairman of the North Carolina Republican Party, and from 1916 to until his resignation in 1922, was a member of the Republican National Committee. Ideologically, he leaned conservative.

Following his political career, Morehead participated in the manufacturing industry, particularly that of wooden goods.

== Personal life and death ==
On April 5, 1893, Morehead married Mary Josephine Garrett; they had three children together, including John Lindsay Morehead. He was Presbyterian. He was also related to John Motley Morehead III. He died on December 13, 1923, aged 57, in Charlotte, from pneumonia, and was buried at Elmwood Cemetery, in Charlotte.

Party political offices
First	Republican nominee for U.S. Senator from North Carolina (Class 2); 1918	Succeeded by A. A. Whitener
U.S. House of Representatives
Preceded by William W. Kitchin	Member of the U.S. House of Representatives from North Carolina's 5th congressional district 1909–1911	Succeeded by Charles M. Stedman
