= Alexander H. Jones =

American politician

Alexander Hamilton Jones (July 21, 1822 – January 29, 1901) was an American Civil War veteran and politician who served two terms as a Congressional Representative from North Carolina. He edited the Hendersonville Pioneer newspaper. A Republican, he was part of the Union League.

== Biography ==
Jones was born near the city of Asheville in Buncombe County, North Carolina, United States, on July 21, 1822.

=== Civil War ===
He engaged in mercantile pursuits, and enlisted in the Union Army in 1863. He was captured in east Tennessee while raising a regiment of Union Volunteers and imprisoned, but made his escape November 14, 1864. He again joined the Union forces in Cumberland, Maryland.

=== Congress ===
After the war, Jones returned to North Carolina and became a member of the State convention in 1865. He was elected as a Republican in November 1865 to the Thirty-ninth Congress, but was not permitted to qualify. Upon the readmission of North Carolina to representation, he was elected (in April 1868) to the Fortieth and Forty-first Congresses and served from July 6, 1868, to March 3, 1871. He was an unsuccessful candidate for reelection in 1870 to the Forty-second Congress.

=== Retirement and death ===
Jones resided in Washington, D.C., until 1876, in Maryland until 1884, in Asheville, North Carolina, until 1890, and in Oklahoma until 1897, when he moved to California. He died in Long Beach, California, and was buried in Long Beach Municipal Cemetery.

U.S. House of Representatives
Preceded by Francis Burton Craige before Civil War (Vacant during War)	Member of the U.S. House of Representatives from North Carolina's 7th congressional district 1868–1871	Succeeded by James C. Harper
