= Robert Franklin Armfield =

American politician

Robert F. Armfield
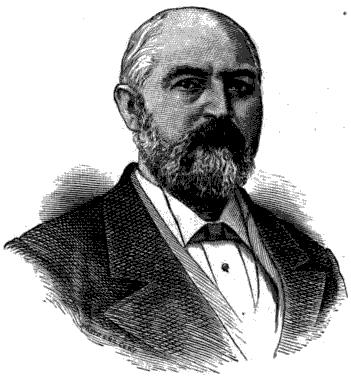
- Born: Robert Franklin Armfield; July 9, 1829; Greensboro, North Carolina, U.S.
- Died: November 9, 1898 (aged 69); Iredell County, North Carolina, U.S.
- Resting place: Oakwood Cemetery in Statesville
- Occupations: Attorney, politician
- Predecessor: William M. Robbins
- Successor: Tyre York
- Spouse: Mary A. Denny
- Children: 7

Robert Franklin Armfield (July 9, 1829 – November 9, 1898) was a 19th-century American lawyer and politician who served as the Lieutenant Governor of North Carolina from 1875 to 1876, and a two-term U.S. Representative from North Carolina between 1879 and 1883.

== Biography ==
Armfield, born near Greensboro, North Carolina in 1829, attended the common schools and later graduated from Trinity College (now Duke University). After reading law with John A. Gilmer, he was admitted to the bar in 1845 and practiced law in Yadkinville.

=== Civil War ===
In 1861, at the outbreak of the American Civil War, Armfield enlisted in the Confederate States Army. He served as lieutenant and later as lieutenant colonel of the Thirty-eighth Regiment of North Carolina state troops. After the war, Armfield moved to Statesville and resumed his law practice.

=== Early political career ===
While on furlough from the Army after being wounded in 1862, Armfield was state solicitor for the sixth district, until he was removed in 1865 by Governor William Woods Holden. He was elected to the North Carolina Senate in 1874 and 1875; during the 1874 session, he was Senate President. Armfield was chosen Lieutenant Governor of North Carolina and served in that post from 1875 to 1876.

=== Congress ===
In 1878, Armfield was elected to the United States House of Representatives and served two terms, in the 46th and 47th United States Congresses (March 4, 1879 – March 3, 1883). He did not stand for re-election to the House in 1882, but instead resumed his law practice.

=== Judicial career and death ===
In 1889, he was appointed and then elected to a term as a superior court judge, a post he held until his death in Statesville on November 9, 1898. Armfield is buried in Statesville's Oakwood Cemetery.

U.S. House of Representatives
Preceded by William M. Robbins	Member of the U.S. House of Representatives from North Carolina's 7th congressional district 1879–1883	Succeeded by Tyre York
