= James C. Harper =

American politician and businessman (1819–1890)

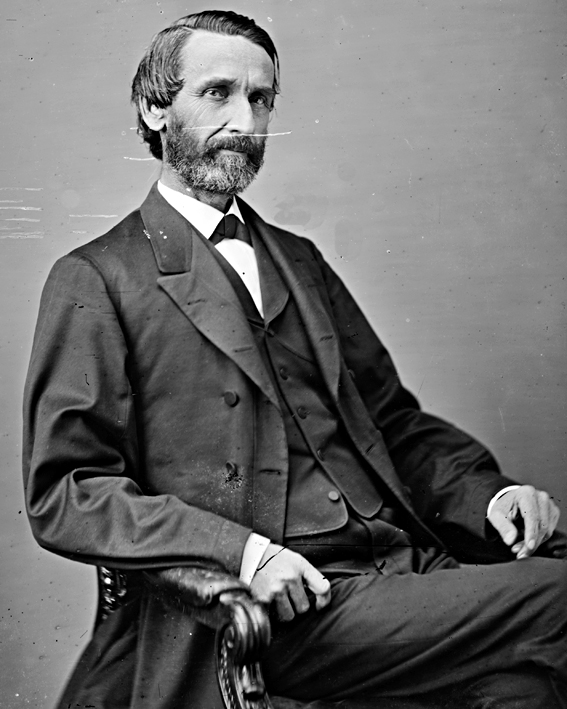
- Portrait of Harper by Mathew Brady, taken between 1860 and 1875

Member of the U.S. House of Representatives from North Carolina's 7th district
- In office March 4, 1871 – March 3, 1873
- Preceded by: Alexander H. Jones
- Succeeded by: William M. Robbins

Member of the North Carolina House of Representatives
- In office 1865–1866

Personal details
- Born: James Clarence Harper; December 6, 1819 Cumberland County, Pennsylvania, US
- Died: January 8, 1890 (aged 70) Patterson, North Carolina, US
- Party: Democratic
- Relations: William Lenoir (great-grandfather-in-law); Clinton A. Cilley (son-in-law); George Washington Finley Harper (cousin); James Harper (uncle)
- Occupation: Politician, businessman

James Clarence Harper (December 6, 1819 – January 8, 1890) was an American politician and businessman. A Democrat, he was a member of the United States House of Representatives from North Carolina.

== Early life ==
Harper was born on December 6, 1819, in Cumberland County, Pennsylvania, one of six children born to John Witherow Harper III and Eliza Love Horner Harper. He was of Irish ancestry. In 1831, he moved to Darke County, Ohio, where he was educated at common schools.

== Career ==
Harper later moved to North Carolina to live with his uncle, James Harper. In 1840, he moved to Lenoir, North Carolina. He laid out the city in 1841 and acted as its civil engineer, drafter, and land surveyor. He owned slaves.

Harper then worked as a businessman. As such, he surveyed the land on which a road from Lenoir to Blowing Rock in 1846 and 1847. He helped found the company which built the road, becoming its president in 1856. He built and mills for cotton, flour, oil, paper, wood, and wool, as well as a blacksmithery, icehouse, and tannery. He also worked as a banker, farmer, logger, and merchant. In 1861, he enlisted into the North Carolina State Militia as a private, later becoming a colonel. He was unable to fight in the American Civil War due to his health.

Harper was a Democrat. In 1865 and 1866, he was a member of the North Carolina House of Representatives. He was a member of the United States House of Representatives from March 4, 1871, to March 3, 1873, representing North Carolina's 7th district. Due to poor health, he introduced only two bills and made one speech, the speech being an argument against the Civil Rights Act of 1875. He was not nominated for the following election. Politically, he was moderately liberal.

After serving in Congress, Harper worked in the roadwork industry and owned a farm.

== Personal life and death ==
On September 12, 1843, Harper married Louisa C. McDowell, the great-granddaughter of William Lenoir; they had three children together. His daughter, Emma, married Clinton A. Cilley. He was Methodist. He died on January 8, 1890, aged 70, in Patterson, and was buried on January 16, at Harpers Chapel Cemetery, in Patterson. His cousin was George Washington Finley Harper.

U.S. House of Representatives
Preceded by Alexander H. Jones	Member of the U.S. House of Representatives from North Carolina's 7th congressional district 1871–1873	Succeeded by William M. Robbins
