= Thomas Michael Holt =

American politician

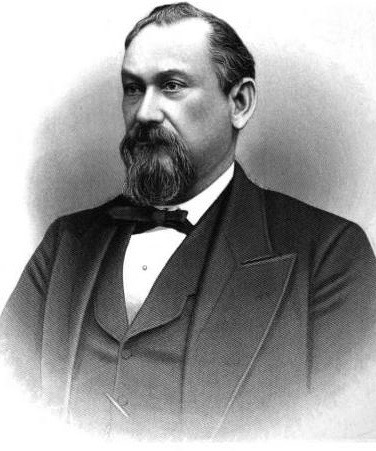

47th Governor of North Carolina
- In office April 7, 1891 – January 18, 1893
- Lieutenant: Vacant
- Preceded by: Daniel Gould Fowle
- Succeeded by: Elias Carr

6th Lieutenant Governor of North Carolina
- In office January 17, 1889 – April 7, 1891
- Governor: Daniel Gould Fowle
- Preceded by: Charles M. Stedman
- Succeeded by: Rufus A. Doughton

Member of the North Carolina House of Representatives

Member of the North Carolina Senate

Personal details
- Born: July 15, 1831 Alamance County, North Carolina, US
- Died: April 11, 1896 (aged 64) Haw River, North Carolina, US
- Party: Democratic
- Spouse: Louisa Matilda Moore
- Children: 6
- Education: University of North Carolina at Chapel Hill
- Profession: Industrialist, politician

Thomas Michael Holt (July 15, 1831 – April 11, 1896) was an American industrialist who served as the 47th governor of North Carolina from 1891 to 1893. Formerly a North Carolina State Senator and Speaker of the House of the North Carolina General Assembly, Holt was instrumental in the founding of North Carolina State University, as well as in establishing several railroads within the state and the state's department of agriculture. Holt was also responsible for the technology behind the family's Holt Mills "Alamance Plaids", the first colored cotton goods produced in the South – a development that revolutionized the Southern textile industry.

Thomas M. Holt AF & AM Masonic Lodge, located in Graham, NC, is named in honor of the former governor.

== Life and career ==
Holt was born in Alamance County, North Carolina, on July 15, 1831, the son of Emily Virginia (Farish) and Edwin Michael Holt. Holt was a descendant of Michael Holt or Holdt, one of the earliest settlers of the Germanna Colony in Virginia in the early 18th century. Holt studied at the University of North Carolina at Chapel Hill for one year before briefly moving to work in a Philadelphia, Pennsylvania, dry goods store.

In 1858, Thomas and his father acquired Benjamin Trollinger's bankrupt textile-manufacturing mill later known as the "Granite Mill" (located in Haw River, North Carolina). In 1861, Thomas acquired his father's interest in the mill and moved to Haw River to oversee the mill's operations. (Edwin Michael Holt had formerly manufactured the so-called Alamance Plaids, the first cotton goods produced in the South on power looms. Edwin M. Holt established his Alamance Cotton Mill in 1837, thus beginning the Southern textile industry.)

In 1868, Thomas's brother-in-law, Adolphus "Dolph" Moore, became business partners with Thomas and the operation was renamed Holt & Moore. In 1876, Moore was murdered, and the mills were consolidated as the Thomas M. Holt Manufacturing Company. (Other members of the Holt family were operating the Haw River Mills, Glencoe Mills, Carolina Mill, Lafayette Mill, the Pilot Mill of Raleigh, and others in their expanding family empire.)

After Thomas's death in 1896, his son, Thomas Jr., took over operations of the mills and expanded them. In 1900, the mills were organized by a local labor union, which sponsored a strike that was eventually broken by lockouts and mill housing evictions by the mill management.

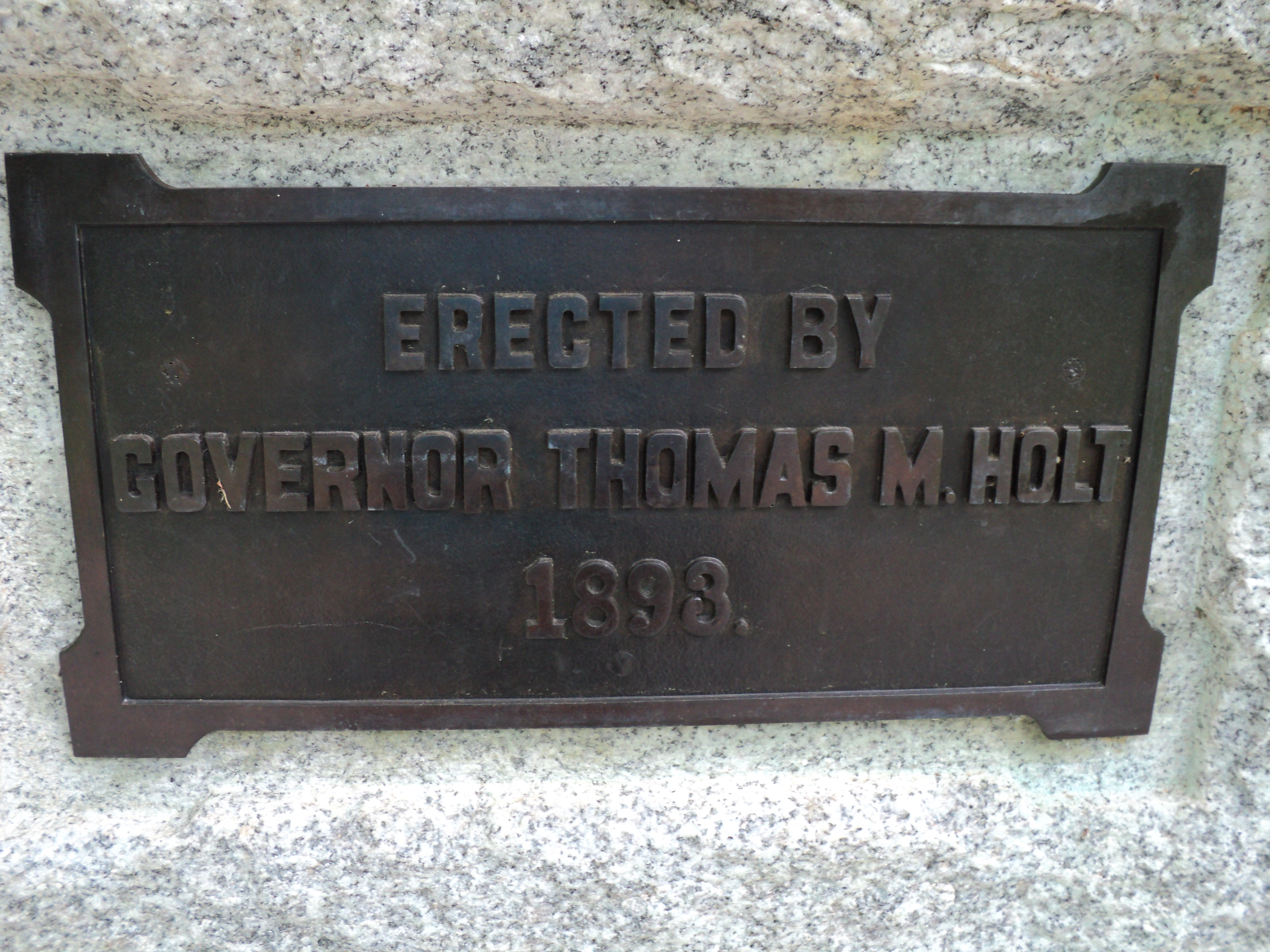
Plaque to Governor Holt on the Major Joseph Winston monument, commemorating Holt's role in establishing Guilford Battle Ground Company and his gift of the Winston monument

Thomas's party affiliation was Democratic, and he served as a local magistrate, a county commissioner, as a member of North Carolina's state senate (24th District) in 1876, as a member of North Carolina's state house of representatives from Alamance County, 1883–87, as the sixth lieutenant governor of North Carolina, 1889–91, and upon the death of governor (Daniel G. Fowle), as 47th governor of North Carolina, 1891–93.

As governor, he was actively involved in establishing a new system of county government, in the construction of the Western North Carolina Railroad and the Cape Fear and Yadkin Valley Railway as well as the North Carolina Railroad, which Holt served as president, as well as in increasing the funding for public schools, the university, and the state hospitals. He pushed for the establishment of an institution for the deaf at Morganton. An outstanding accomplishment was his getting the holders of bonds for the North Carolina Railroad to release the State from the lien on the State's shares. This saved the State money as the property was valued at more than $5 million. The Holt family had long ties to the railroad company, and these were undoubtedly useful in Holt's striking a deal with the bondholders. Following his service as governor, Holt sat on the boards of both the University of North Carolina and Davidson College.

In 1892, he was defeated by Elias Carr for the Democratic nomination for governor.

Holt was aided in the burgeoning Holt family mill empire by his brother-in-law, James Nathaniel Williamson, who had married Thomas Michael Holt's sister Mary. The Holt family eventually became the largest textile barons in the state, running scores of different mills, under various names, and as various Holt heirs and their in-laws broke off from the main enterprise and founded their own companies. Ultimately, however, the Holt mills were sold by the family and became the backbone of the emerging Burlington Mills (later Burlington Industries), overseen by rival industrialist Spencer Love.

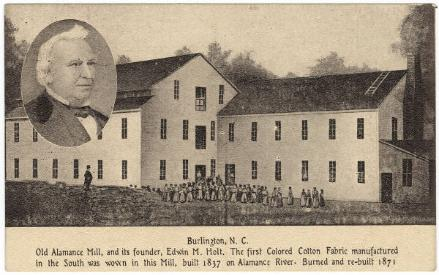
Alamance Cotton Factory, built by Edwin M. Holt, 1837, first manufacturer of colored cotton fabrics in the South on power looms

Thomas Holt died in Haw River on April 11, 1896.

Party political offices
Preceded by Charles Manly Stedman	Democratic nominee for Lieutenant Governor of North Carolina; 1888	Succeeded by Rufus A. Doughton
Political offices
Preceded by Charles M. Stedman	Lieutenant Governor of North Carolina; 1889–1891	Succeeded by Rufus A. Doughton
Preceded by Daniel Gould Fowle	Governor of North Carolina; 1891–1893	Succeeded by Elias Carr
