= James M. Leach =

American politician

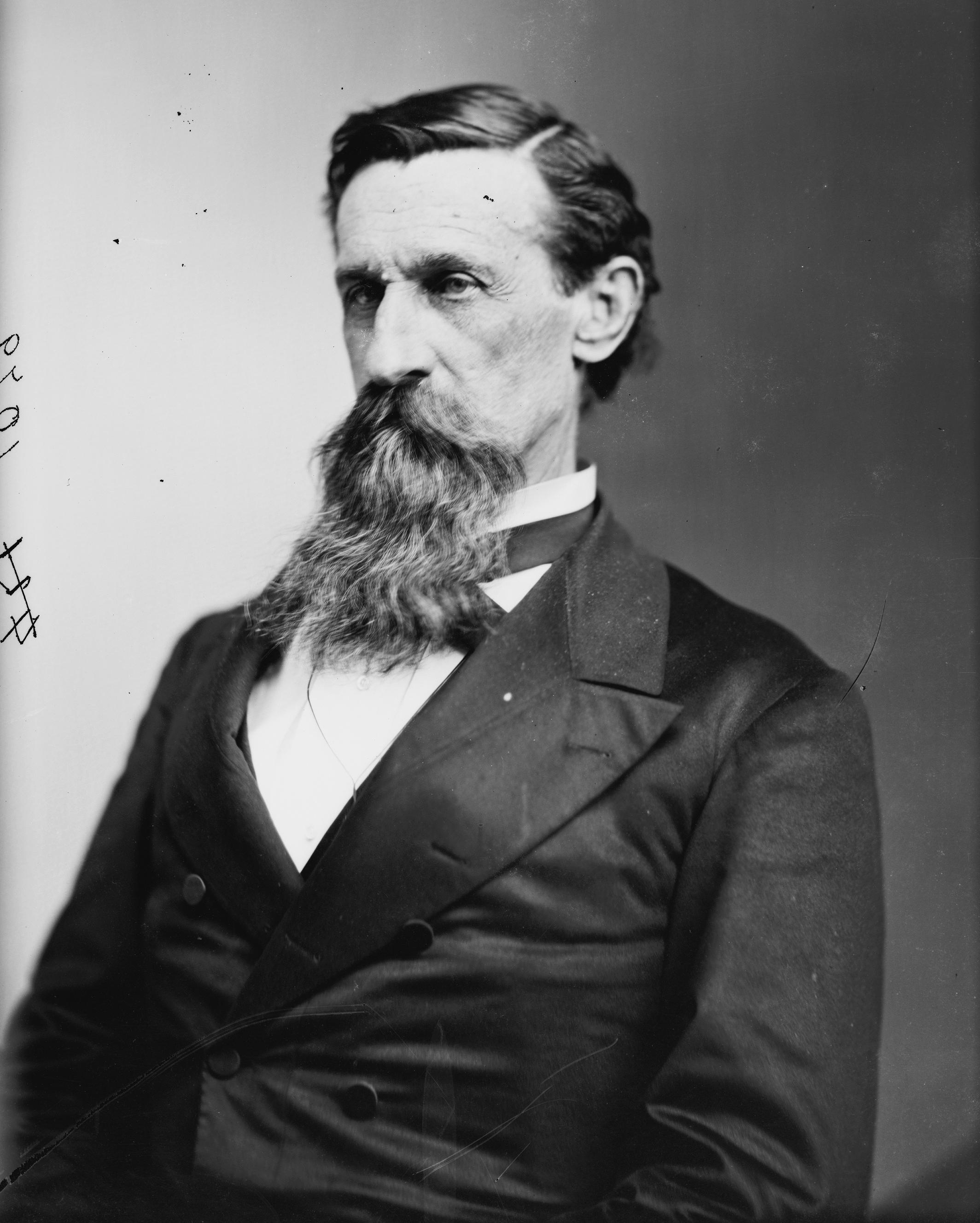

Member of the U.S. House of Representatives from North Carolina's 5th district
- In office March 4, 1871 – March 3, 1875
- Preceded by: Israel G. Lash
- Succeeded by: Alfred M. Scales
- In office March 4, 1859 – March 3, 1861
- Succeeded by: Alfred M. Scales

Personal details
- Born: James Madison Leach; January 17, 1815 Randolph County, North Carolina
- Died: June 1, 1891 (aged 76) Lexington, North Carolina
- Resting place: Hopewell Cemetery, near Trinity, North Carolina

James Madison Leach (January 17, 1815 – June 1, 1891) was an American lawyer, Confederate Civil War veteran, and politician who served as a U.S. representative from North Carolina.

== Biography ==
Leach was born on his family's homestead, "Lansdowne", in Randolph County, North Carolina, January 17, 1815. He attended the common schools and Caldwell Institute in Greensboro, North Carolina. He entered the US Military Academy in 1836, but resigned in 1838 and returned to North Carolina to study law. He was admitted to the bar in 1842. Leach began his law practice in Lexington, North Carolina, and served in the State house of commons from 1848 to 1858.

=== Congress ===
Leach served as a presidential elector on the American Party ticket in 1856 and was elected as an Opposition Party candidate to the Thirty-sixth Congress (March 4, 1859 – March 3, 1861).

=== Civil War ===
During the Civil War, Leach served as a captain and lieutenant colonel of the 21st North Carolina Infantry Regiment in the Confederate Army. He saw action in many of the early campaigns of Stonewall Jackson, including the Valley Campaign. He served in the Army of Northern Virginia during the Peninsula Campaign and other battles, including the Battle of Gettysburg, where the regiment assaulted Cemetery Hill. He served as a member of the Confederate States Congress in 1864 and 1865.

=== Return to Congress ===
He served as a member of the North Carolina Senate in 1865, 1866, and again in 1879 and was elected as a Democrat to the Forty-second and Forty-third Congresses (March 4, 1871 – March 3, 1875).

The grand jury of the Federal District Court in session at Raleigh, returned a true bill of indictment against Jas M Leach, member of Congress from North Carolina, James A Leach, and fifteen others, for conspiracy, under the act of Congress of May 31, 1872, commonly known as the Ku Klux law.

=== Death and burial ===
Leach died in Lexington, North Carolina on June 1, 1891, and is interred in Hopewell Cemetery, near Trinity, North Carolina.

U.S. House of Representatives
Preceded by Alfred M. Scales	Member of the U.S. House of Representatives from North Carolina's 6th congressional district 1859–1861	Succeeded by Civil War
Preceded by Israel G. Lash	Member of the U.S. House of Representatives from North Carolina's 5th congressional district 1871–1875	Succeeded by Alfred M. Scales
