= Charles Manly Stedman =

American politician

Charles M. Stedman
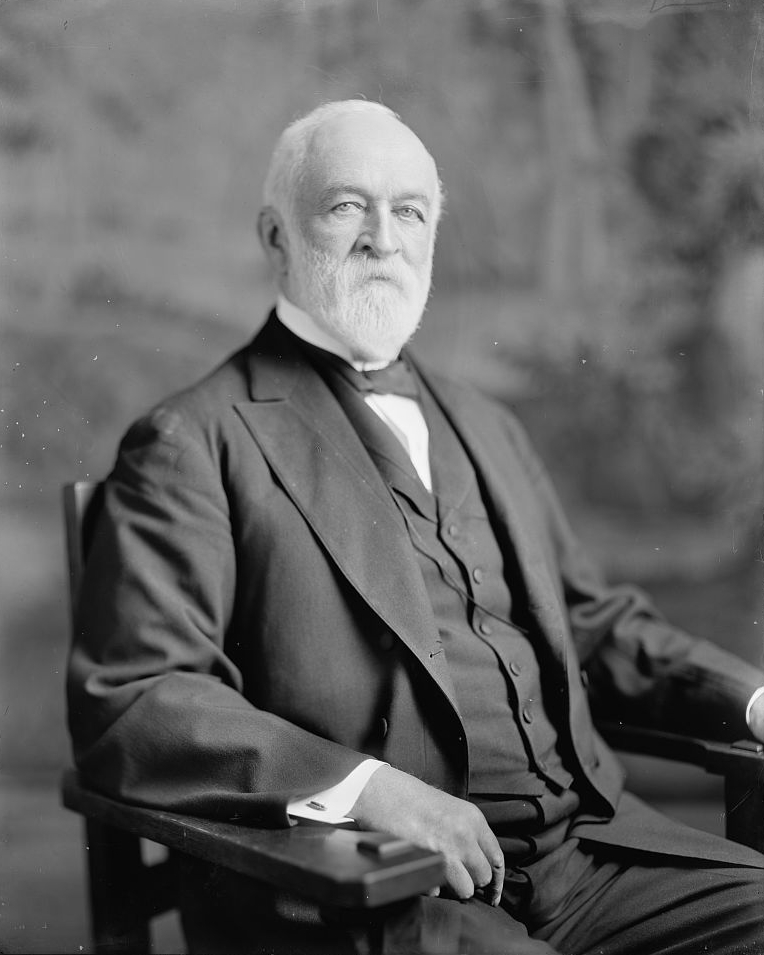

Member of the U.S. House of Representatives from North Carolina's 5th district
- In office March 4, 1911 – September 23, 1930
- Preceded by: John M. Morehead
- Succeeded by: Franklin W. Hancock Jr.

5th Lieutenant Governor of North Carolina
- In office January 21, 1885 – January 17, 1889
- Governor: Alfred M. Scales
- Preceded by: James L. Robinson
- Succeeded by: Thomas M. Holt

Personal details
- Born: Charles Manly Stedman; January 29, 1841 Pittsboro, North Carolina, U.S.
- Died: September 23, 1930 (aged 89) Washington, D.C., U.S.
- Party: Democratic
- Spouse: Catherine Defosset Wright
- Education: University of North Carolina
- Occupation: Lawyer

Military service
- Allegiance: Confederate States
- Branch/service: Confederate States Army
- Years of service: 1861–1865
- Rank: Major
- Unit: 1st (Bethel) North Carolina Infantry; 44th North Carolina Infantry
- Battles/wars: American Civil War

Charles Manly Stedman (January 29, 1841 – September 23, 1930) was a politician and lawyer from North Carolina. He served ten terms in the U.S. House of Representatives from 1911 to 1930 and was the last veteran of either side of the Civil War to hold a seat in Congress.

== Biography ==
Born in Pittsboro, North Carolina, Stedman moved to Fayetteville, North Carolina with his parents in 1853 where he attended Pittsboro and Donaldson Academies and graduated from the University of North Carolina at Chapel Hill in 1861, where he was a member of the Dialectic and Philanthropic Societies. During the Civil War he enlisted as a private in the Fayetteville Independent Light Infantry Company; part of the Confederate 1st North Carolina "Bethel" Regiment. He later was promoted to major of the 44th North Carolina Infantry. Afterwards, Stedman returned to Chatham County, North Carolina and taught school in Pittsboro for one year. He studied law and was admitted to the bar in 1865, commencing practice in Wilmington, North Carolina.

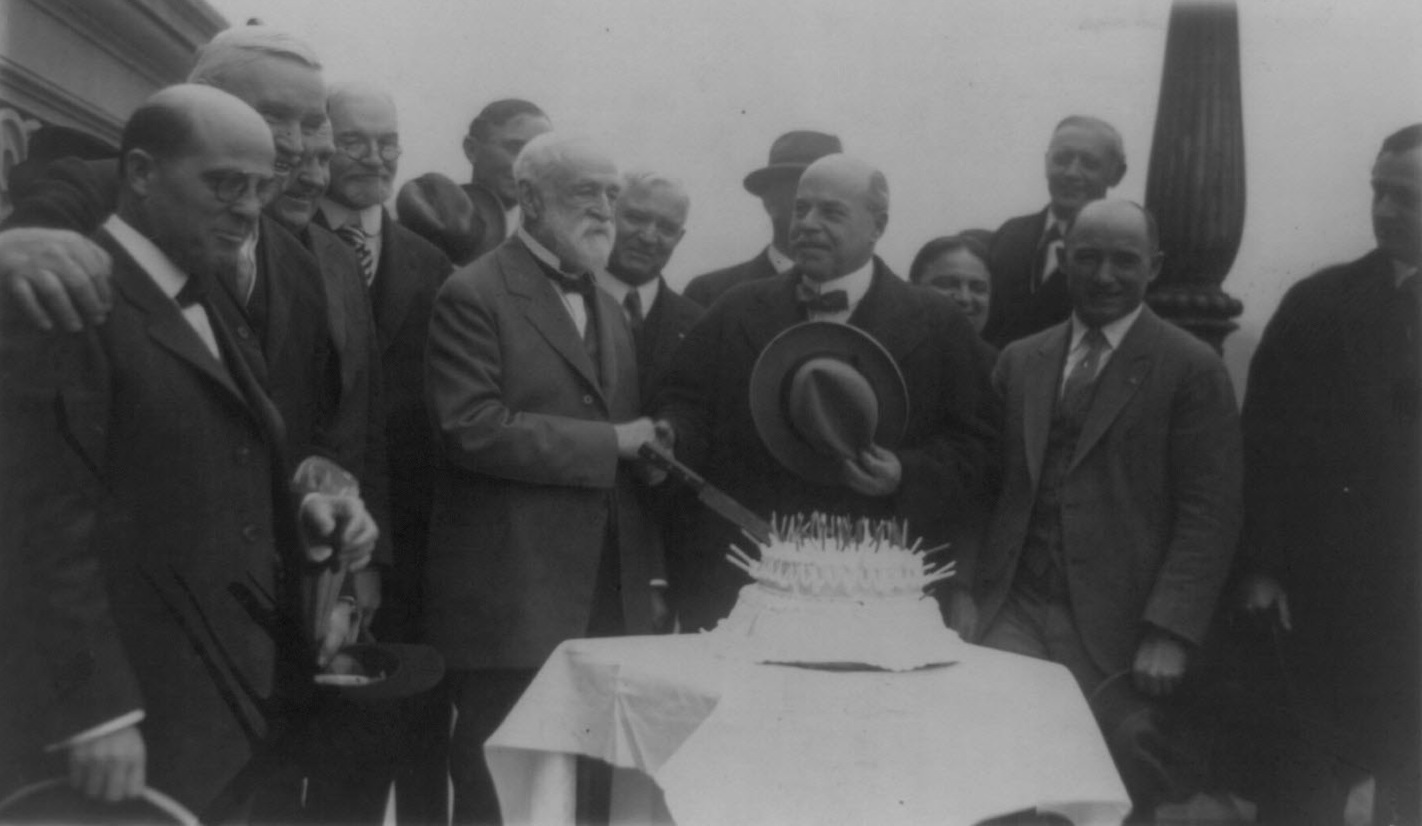
Charles M. Stedman celebrates his eighty-fifth birthday with fellow congressmen in front of the U.S. Capitol. Speaker of the House Nicholas Longworth shakes hands with Stedman while presenting a congressional cake with eighty-five candles, January 30, 1926.

=== Politics ===
Stedman first got involved in politics as a delegate to the 1880 Democratic National Convention, which nominated Winfield Scott Hancock and William Hayden English for President and Vice President of the United States. He was elected the fifth Lieutenant Governor of North Carolina in 1884, serving from 1885 to 1889, and unsuccessfully ran for the Democratic nomination for Governor of North Carolina in 1888. He moved to Asheville, North Carolina in 1891 and to Greensboro, North Carolina in 1898, continuing to practice law. Stedman served as a trustee of the University of North Carolina from 1899 to 1915, was president of the North Carolina Bar Association from 1900 to 1901, was again an unsuccessful candidate for Governor of North Carolina in 1903–04, and was director and president of the North Carolina Railroad from 1909 to 1910.

==== Congress ====
Stedman was elected a Democrat to the United States House of Representatives in 1910 and was reelected to the seat in 1912, 1914, 1916, 1918, 1920, 1922, 1924, 1926 and 1928, serving until his death in Washington, D.C. on September 23, 1930, the last veteran of the Civil War, either Union or Confederate Army, to serve in the U.S. Congress.

In 1923 Stedman introduced a bill in the Senate to create a Mammy memorial in Washington. The bill passed in the Senate, but following a large amount of protest, died in the House.

=== Death and burial ===
He was interred in Cross Creek Cemetery in Fayetteville, North Carolina. A commemorative roadside sign was placed in Fayetteville in his honor.

== See also ==
- List of members of the United States Congress who died in office (1900–1949)

Party political offices
Preceded by James L. Robinson	Democratic nominee for Lieutenant Governor of North Carolina; 1884	Succeeded by Thomas Michael Holt
Political offices
Preceded by James L. Robinson	Lieutenant Governor of North Carolina; 1885 – 1889	Succeeded by Thomas M. Holt
U.S. House of Representatives
Preceded by John M. Morehead	Member of the U.S. House of Representatives from North Carolina's 5th congressional district March 4, 1911 – September 23, 1930	Succeeded by Franklin W. Hancock Jr.
Honorary titles
Preceded by Isaac R. Sherwood	Oldest member of the U.S. House of Representatives; 1925–1930	Succeeded by Schuyler Merritt
