= Oliver H. Dockery =

American politician (1830–1906)

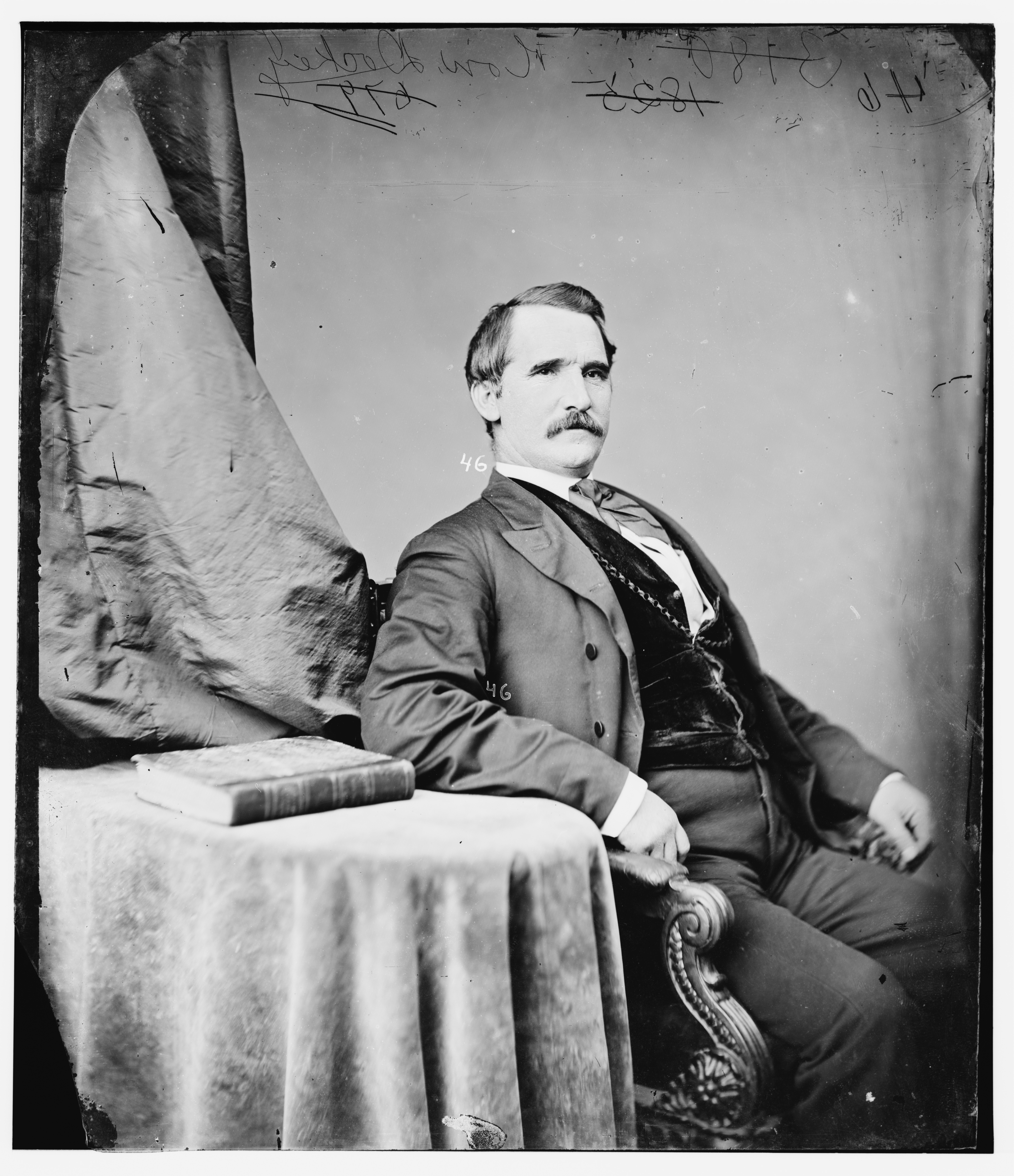

Member of the U.S. House of Representatives from North Carolina's 3rd district
- In office July 13, 1868 – March 3, 1871
- Preceded by: Warren Winslow
- Succeeded by: Alfred Moore Waddell

Personal details
- Born: August 12, 1830 Rockingham, North Carolina, U.S.
- Died: March 21, 1906 (aged 75) Baltimore, Maryland, U.S.
- Party: Republican
- Other political affiliations: Populist
- Education: Wake Forest College; University of North Carolina at Chapel Hill

Oliver Hart Dockery (August 12, 1830 – March 21, 1906) was a farmer and a politician, elected as a Republican U.S. representative from North Carolina after the Civil War. The son of Alfred Dockery, he was elected before the war in 1858 to one term in the state house of representatives.

== Early life ==
Oliver Hart Dockery was born in 1830 in Rockingham, North Carolina. He attended public school and Wake Forest College; was graduated from the University of North Carolina at Chapel Hill in 1848. He studied law, but never practiced. He engaged in agricultural pursuits and became involved in politics. He was elected as a member of the state house of representatives in 1858 and 1859.

== Civil War and after ==
During the American Civil War, he served for a short time in the Confederate service, but withdrew and advocated sustaining the Federal Government. Upon the readmission of North Carolina to representation, he was elected as a Republican to the Fortieth Congress; reelected to the Forty-first Congress and served from July 13, 1868, to March 3, 1871. He was chairman, Committee on the Freedmen's Bureau (Forty-first Congress); unsuccessful candidate for reelection in 1870 to the Forty-second Congress. After that he returned to agricultural pursuits. In 1875, following the increasing violence of the election campaign of 1874, when a Democratic governor was elected, he was a member of the State constitutional convention in 1875.

Dockery was an unsuccessful Republican nominee for Governor of North Carolina in 1888. He was appointed by the national Republican administration as United States consul general at Rio de Janeiro, Brazil, on June 14, 1889, and served until July 1, 1893. After the administration changed, he resumed agricultural pursuits.

He tried to return to politics in 1896, He put his name forward to be Populist Party candidate for Lieutenant Governor of North Carolina but did not win the nomination. (That year Republican Daniel Lindsay Russell was elected as governor, when a Populist candidate drew off some Democratic votes.) In 1898, he contested John Bellamy's election to the U.S. House of Representatives on the grounds of fraud and voter intimidation. But he was unable to overturn the election result.

Dockery died in Baltimore, Maryland, March 21, 1906. He was interred in his family cemetery at Mangum, North Carolina.

== See also ==
- 40th United States Congress
- 41st United States Congress

Party political offices
Preceded by Tyre York	Republican nominee for Governor of North Carolina; 1888	Succeeded by David M. Furches
U.S. House of Representatives
Preceded by Warren Winslow	Member of the U.S. House of Representatives from North Carolina's 3rd congressional district 1868–1871	Succeeded by Alfred M. Waddell
