= Alfred Moore Scales =

American politician (1827–1892)

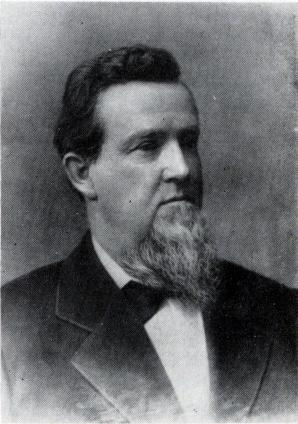

45th Governor of North Carolina
- In office January 21, 1885 – January 17, 1889
- Lieutenant: Charles M. Stedman
- Preceded by: Thomas Jordan Jarvis
- Succeeded by: Daniel Gould Fowle

Member of the U.S. House of Representatives from North Carolina's 5th district
- In office March 4, 1875 – December 30, 1884
- Preceded by: James Leach
- Succeeded by: James Reid

Member of the U.S. House of Representatives from North Carolina's 6th district
- In office March 4, 1857 – March 3, 1859
- Preceded by: Richard C. Puryear
- Succeeded by: James Leach

Member of the North Carolina State Legislature
- In office 1865

Personal details
- Born: November 26, 1827 Reidsville, North Carolina, U.S.
- Died: February 9, 1892 (aged 64) Greensboro, North Carolina, U.S.
- Party: Democratic
- Spouse: Kate Henderson
- Education: University of North Carolina, Chapel Hill

Military service
- Allegiance: United States; Confederate States
- Branch/service: Confederate States Army
- Years of service: 1861–1865
- Rank: Brigadier General
- Battles/wars: American Civil War: Peninsula Campaign; Battle of Fredericksburg; Battle of Chancellorsville; Battle of Gettysburg; Overland Campaign; Siege of Petersburg

Alfred Moore Scales (November 26, 1827 – February 9, 1892) was a North Carolina state legislator, Confederate general in the American Civil War, and the 45th governor of North Carolina from 1885 to 1889.

== Early life ==
Scales was born at Reidsville, in Rockingham County, North Carolina. He lived on Mulberry Island Plantation. After attending a Presbyterian school, the Caldwell institute and the University of North Carolina at Chapel Hill, Scales entered teaching for a time. Later, he studied law with Judge William H. Battle and Judge Settle and then opened a law office in Madison, North Carolina. While at the University of North Carolina at Chapel Hill, he was a member of the Dialectic and Philanthropic Societies.

== Pre-War public service ==
Scales was elected county solicitor in 1852. He was elected four times to the North Carolina state legislature and served as chairman of the Finance Committee. In 1854, he ran a close but unsuccessful race as the Democratic candidate for United States Congress in a Whig district. In 1857, he was elected to Congress but was defeated for re-election two years later. From 1858 until the spring of 1861, he held the office of clerk and master of the court of equity of Rockingham County. In 1860, he was an elector for the Breckinridge ticket and subsequently involved in the debate over North Carolina's secession.

== Civil War service ==
=== Early military service ===
All of Alfred Scales's Civil War service was with Robert E. Lee's Army of Northern Virginia. Soon after the call for troops from Washington he volunteered as a private in the North Carolina service, but was at once elected captain of his company, H of the 13th North Carolina Infantry Regiment, and was elected to succeed General William Dorsey Pender as colonel on November 14, 1862. He was engaged at Yorktown and the Battle of Williamsburg in the Peninsula Campaign, and in the Seven Days Battles near Richmond. After Malvern Hill, he collapsed from exhaustion and came near to death. His superior, Brig. Gen. Samuel Garland, Jr., said in his report that Scales was "conspicuous for his fine bearing. Seizing the colors of his regiment at a critical moment at Cold Harbor and advancing to the front, he called on the 13th to stand to them, thus restoring confidence and keeping his men in position." It took him until November to recuperate so he missed the battles of both Second Manassas and Antietam, but returned in time for the battles of Fredericksburg and Chancellorsville.

During the winter of 1862–63, the 35-year-old colonel married 18-year-old Kate Henderson. She was the daughter of a prominent family from Gaston County, North Carolina.

At Fredericksburg, in December 1862, Scales temporarily took command of the brigade after General Pender fell wounded. Pender turned over the command during a federal assault, saying to him, "Drive those scoundrels out". Scales promptly ordered Major C. C. Cole of the 22nd North Carolina to dislodge the enemy, which A.P. Hill reported was "handsomely done."

Scales again served with distinction during the Battle of Chancellorsville in May 1863, where he was wounded in the thigh, continuing on the field until loss of blood forced him to leave. It was to his regiment that General Pender said, "I have nothing to say to you but to hold you all up as models in duty, courage and daring." In his official report Pender referred to Colonel Scales as "a man as gallant as is to be found in the service."

=== Gettysburg Campaign ===
While at home recovering from his wound, he was promoted to brigadier general on June 13, 1863, and upon his return was assigned to the command of Pender's old brigade when Pender was promoted to the command of A.P. Hill's Light Division. In the first day's fight at Gettysburg with Pender's Division, it was the attack of his brigade that helped pave the way for Abner M. Perrin's brigade to break through the Union line on Seminary Ridge and force the enemy to retreat toward Cemetery Hill.

During this attack, Scales's Brigade suffered heavy casualties. He personally fought with gallantry, and was severely wounded in the leg by a shell fragment on Seminary Ridge. Every field officer of his brigade was killed or wounded except two, and his brigade, already reduced by its losses at Chancellorsville, lost nearly 550 men out of the 1,350 engaged.

On the second day at Gettysburg, the brigade was only engaged in skirmishing, but on the third day of battle it participated in Pickett's Charge. Half of General Pender's division, James Lane's and Scales's brigades advanced in the charge with Pickett's and Pettigrew's divisions. Since Pender had been wounded, his two brigades in the charge were placed under the command of Major General Isaac R. Trimble. Due to Scales's wounding, his brigade was commanded during the charge by Colonel William Lee J. Lowrance. Elements of this brigade were among the Confederates to advance farthest in the unsuccessful charge.

With General Pender at his side, Scales rode back to Virginia in an ambulance, and after being left at Winchester, he recovered enough from his wounds to be returned to service; however, General Pender died from his wounds.

=== Military service after Gettysburg ===
After returning to service upon the apparent recovery from his wound, Scales participated in the campaigns of the Army of Northern Virginia during 1864 including the Wilderness, Spotsylvania Court House, and the Siege of Petersburg. Due to his previous wounds being unhealed, Scales took a leave of absence late in the war, and was at home in North Carolina when the army surrendered at Appomattox Court House. There is no record that the general was ever formally paroled, but he applied for amnesty at Raleigh on June 22, 1865, and was pardoned on June 18, 1866.

== Post-War public service ==
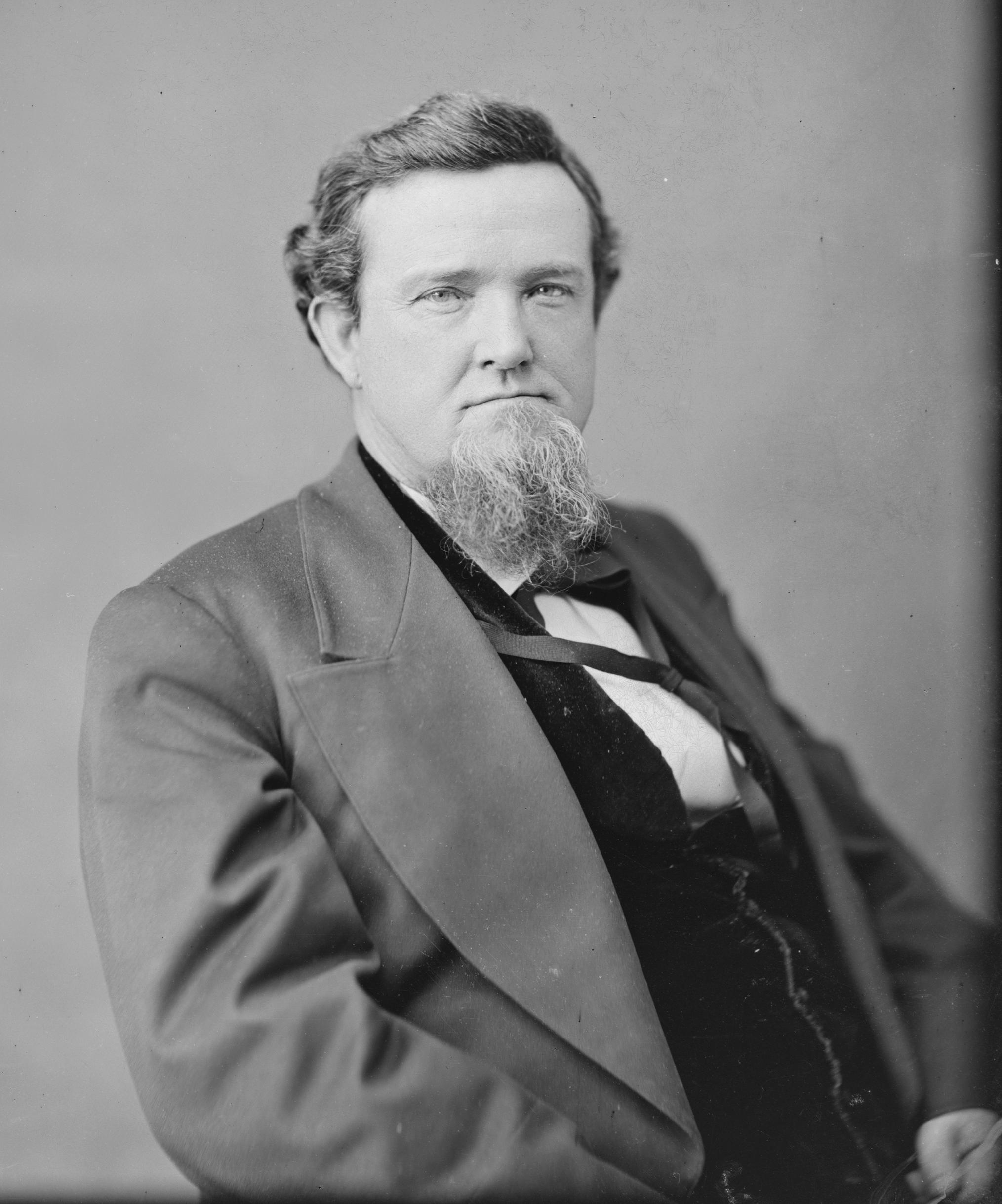
Postbellum portrait

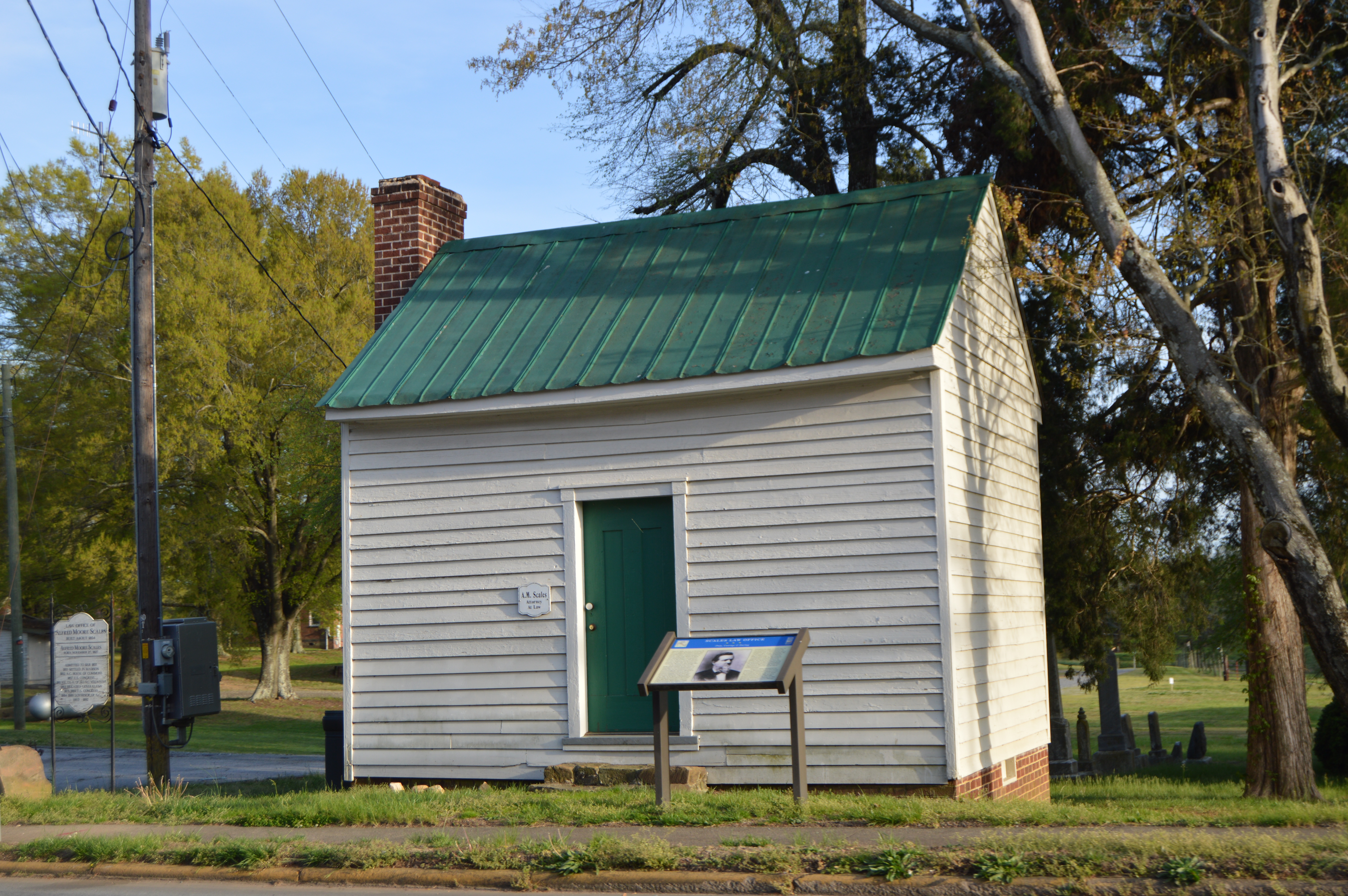
Scales' law office in Madison

After the war, Scales returned to the practice of law, a profession in which he gained great distinction. In 1874 he was elected to the Forty-fourth Congress, and was re-elected to the four succeeding congresses. In 1884, he was elected Governor of North Carolina by a majority of over twenty thousand votes. Upon the expiration of his term as governor in 1888 he retired permanently from political life, repeatedly refusing to run again for Congress. In 1888 Scales left the governorship and was elected president of the Piedmont Bank at Greensboro, and served as its president until he died.

Scales was never in good health after leaving the governorship in 1888. His condition was diagnosed as Bright's disease, causing his brain to become so affected that during the last months of his life, he was only conscious for short intervals. He died in Greensboro and was buried there at the Green Hill Cemetery.

Alfred Scales was greatly beloved and respected by all. Noted historian Douglas S. Freeman, in discussing eight promotions to brigadier general Lee needed to make after Chancellorsville said, "One promotion was a matter of course. ..." and then mentioned Scales first of the eight. At the time of his death all the businesses in Greensboro closed and the entire city turned out to attend his funeral. His family life was always pleasant. He was survived by his wife, Kate, and his daughter, Mrs. John Noble Wyllie.

The Alfred Moore Scales Law Office at Madison was listed on the National Register of Historic Places in 1982.

== See also ==
- List of American Civil War generals (Confederate)

== Notes ==
Party political offices
Preceded by Thomas Jordan Jarvis	Democratic nominee for Governor of North Carolina; 1884	Succeeded by Daniel Gould Fowle
U.S. House of Representatives
Preceded by Richard C. Puryear	Member of the U.S. House of Representatives from North Carolina's 6th congressional district 1857–1859	Succeeded by Alfred M. Scales
Preceded by James Leach	Member of the U.S. House of Representatives from North Carolina's 5th congressional district 1875–1884	Succeeded by James Reid
Political offices
Preceded by Thomas Jordan Jarvis	Governor of North Carolina; 1885–1889	Succeeded by Daniel Gould Fowle
