= Daniel Gould Fowle =

American politician

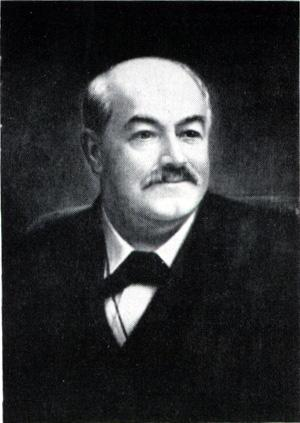

46th Governor of North Carolina
- In office January 17, 1889 – April 7, 1891
- Lieutenant: Thomas Michael Holt
- Preceded by: Alfred Moore Scales
- Succeeded by: Thomas Michael Holt

Personal details
- Born: Daniel Gould Fowle; March 3, 1831 Washington, North Carolina, U.S.
- Died: April 7, 1891 (aged 60) Raleigh, North Carolina, U.S.
- Party: Democratic
- Spouse(s): Ellen Brant Pearson, Mary E. Haywood
- Children: 5 (including Helen Whitaker Fowle Knight)
- Education: Princeton University
- Profession: Lawyer, politician

Daniel Gould Fowle (March 3, 1831 – April 7, 1891) was the 46th governor of the U.S. state of North Carolina from 1889 until his death in 1891. He had served as a state superior court judge from 1865 to 1867.

Fowle was the first governor to live in the governor's official residence, and ultimately died. According to popular legend, the ghost of Gov. Fowle has haunted the North Carolina Executive Mansion from time to time.

== Early life ==
Fowle was born in Washington, North Carolina to Samuel and Martha Marsh Fowle. Samuel Fowle had moved to North Carolina from Massachusetts in 1815 and was a wealthy merchant. Martha was the daughter of Daniel Gould Marsh, a merchant who came to North Carolina from Rhode Island in about 1790. Daniel Fowle attended Bingham Academy, where he finished first in his class, and Princeton University. Upon graduating from Princeton in 1851 he studied law at Richmond Hill Law School and began a practice in Raleigh, North Carolina.

== Civil War ==
Fowle was opposed to secession, but he still volunteered as a private in the North Carolina Militia. He was soon appointed major in the commissary branch. He resigned that post and helped to raise the 31st North Carolina Infantry regiment. On September 9, 1861, Fowle was appointed lieutenant colonel of the regiment. In February 1862, Fowle and the 31st NC were captured on Roanoke Island. He was paroled two weeks later. In September 1862, he was defeated in the election for colonel of the regiment and left the Confederate States Army. In October, he was elected to the state legislature representing Wake County, North Carolina. In March 1863, Governor Zebulon B. Vance appointed Fowle adjutant general of North Carolina with the rank of major general. Fowle resigned the post in the fall of 1863 after a disagreement with Vance. Fowle was reelected to the legislature in 1864.

== Post-War ==
Fowle returned to his law practice and made a name for himself in the state Democratic Party. In 1868, he was elected as the state chairman of the Democratic Party. In 1880 he was defeated in the gubernatorial election and in 1884 he lost a race for Congress.

== Governor ==
Fowle's first wife, Ellen Brent Pearson, who died in 1862, was the daughter of Richmond Mumford Pearson, sister of US representative Richmond Pearson, and aunt of Major general Richmond P. Davis. Fowle was nominated by the "liberal" faction of the Democratic Party in 1888 and he won the general election. As he was widowed when elected, his daughter Helen Whitaker Fowle Knight served as his first lady. He created a state railroad commission to protect farmers and advocated for education for women. He died while in office and is buried in Oakwood Cemetery in Raleigh.

Party political offices
Preceded by Alfred Moore Scales	Democratic nominee for Governor of North Carolina; 1888	Succeeded by Elias Carr
Political offices
Preceded by Alfred Moore Scales	Governor of North Carolina; 1889–1891	Succeeded by Thomas Michael Holt
