= Hamlet chicken processing plant fire =

1991 industrial fire in Hamlet, North Carolina, US

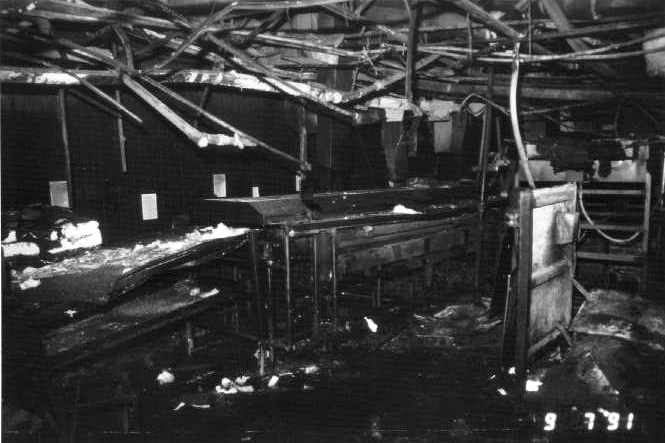
- The deep fryer in the Imperial Food Products plant where the fire started
- Date: September 3, 1991
- Time: Approximately 8:15 a.m.
- Location: Hamlet, North Carolina, United States; 34°52′53″N 79°42′04″W
- Type: Industrial fire
- Cause: Uncoupled hose leaking hydraulic fluid ignited by fryer, workers were trapped by locked doors
- Deaths: 25
- Injuries: 54
- Inquest: United States Fire Administration
- Convicted: Emmett J. Roe, plant owner
- Charges: 25 counts of involuntary manslaughter
- Verdict: Plead guilty
- Sentence: 19 years, 11 months (paroled after about 4 years)

On September 3, 1991, an industrial fire caused by a failed improvised repair to a hydraulic line destroyed the Imperial Food Products chicken processing plant in Hamlet, North Carolina, United States. Despite three previous fires in 11 years of operation, the plant had never received a safety inspection. The fire killed 25 people and injured 54, many of whom were unable to escape due to locked exits. It was the second deadliest industrial disaster in North Carolina's history.

Imperial Food Products was a corporation owned by Emmett Roe, who acquired the Hamlet facility in 1980 to produce chicken products. The company had a poor safety record at one of its other plants, and the Hamlet building lacked a fire alarm or an operational fire sprinkler system. For reasons that remain disputed, Roe ordered several exterior doors of the plant locked in the summer of 1991—including a labeled fire exit—in violation of federal safety regulations and without notifying most workers. In September, the plant's maintenance workers attempted to replace a leaking hydraulic line, attached to the conveyor belt which fed chicken tenders into a fryer in the processing room, with improvised parts. On September 3 at around 8:15 am, they turned on the conveyor belt after altering the line; it separated from its connection and spewed hydraulic fluid around the room. The fluid vaporized and was ignited by the fryer's flame. Fire engulfed the facility in minutes, severing telephone lines and filling the plant with hydrocarbon-charged smoke and carbon monoxide.

There were 90 workers in the plant at the time. Some were able to escape through the plant's front door, while others could not leave due to locked or obstructed exits. Brad Roe (Emmett's son and the company's operations manager) drove to the local fire station for help since the telephone line had burned; firefighters reached the scene at 8:27 am and sent a mutual aid call to other fire departments. Over 100 medical and emergency service personnel ultimately responded. A delivery truck at the loading dock and a dumpster were moved to create openings. One maintenance worker kicked through a locked door to free himself and some of his coworkers. Firefighters brought the fire under control by 10:00 a.m. Most of the dead were killed by smoke inhalation. Of those who died, 18 were female and 7 were male; one was a vending machine deliveryman and the rest were Imperial workers.

The plant permanently closed and Imperial Food Products, fined a record-high state-imposed $808,150 penalty (equivalent to $1,910,298 in 2025) for safety violations, declared bankruptcy. Survivors suffered long-term adverse health effects, including respiratory ailments, muscular injuries, and cognitive impairments. Roe pled guilty to 25 counts of involuntary manslaughter and received a 20-year prison sentence, of which he served about four years. The North Carolina General Assembly passed 14 new worker safety laws, including whistleblower protections, and the state inspector corps was increased from 60 to 114 personnel.

== Background ==
=== Imperial Food Products plant in Hamlet ===
Emmett J. Roe founded Imperial Food Products Incorporated (commonly called Imperial) in Moosic, Pennsylvania in the 1970s after acquiring a food processing plant from his former employer, Empire Frozen Foods. The corporation supplied grocery stores and distributors with chicken products. Roe purchased the largely-decommissioned Mello-Buttercup Ice Cream plant, located along Bridges Street in Hamlet, North Carolina, in September 1980. The location was chosen for its proximity to poultry suppliers and markets, and for North Carolina's lower labor costs relative to the rest of the United States. The facility was situated in a predominantly African American area of Hamlet. A one-story building of bricks and metalwork, the plant's basic structure dated back to the early 20th century. The building was extensively renovated before becoming operational and expanded from 21,300 square feet (2,000 m^{2}) to 37,000 square feet (3,400 m^{2}). Seven of the changes that were made to the building required permits by law, but Roe never applied for them. Roe's son Brad became the leader at the new plant as operations manager several years after it opened; another family member, James Neal Hair, worked as his deputy as plant manager. The Roes recruited a workforce dominated by impoverished and undereducated people, including many single mothers and high school dropouts. The plant produced a variety of custom chicken products from pre-cut frozen chicken breasts, but mostly made battered deep-fried chicken tenders which were sold to restaurants in the American South, including regional locations for Long John Silver's, Red Lobster, Captain D's, and Shoney's.

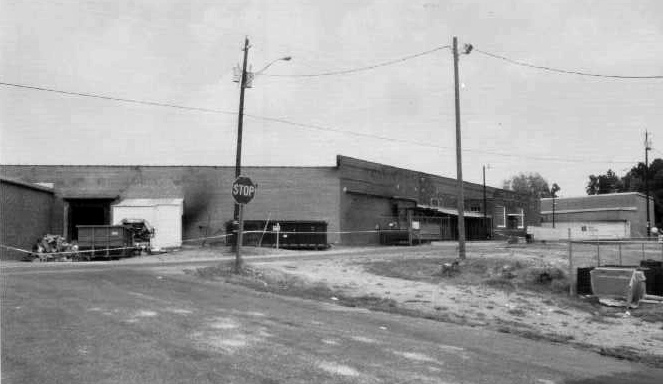
A view of the plant from front and side, taken shortly after the fire

North Carolina law required new industrial businesses to apply for a license to operate, and any business with 11 or more employees to register with the North Carolina Department of Labor and the United States Occupational Safety and Health Administration (OSHA). Although OSHA was a federal agency, North Carolina had assumed responsibility for enforcing its safety standards in the mid-1970s. Registering a business with the Department of Labor would add the workplace to a lottery for a surprise inspection. Roe never applied for a business license and did not register the plant with the labor department. Roe also did not register the plant with city or Richmond County taxation authorities and never paid any local property tax, despite being asked by officials to do so; Imperial Food Products ultimately owed local governments thousands of dollars for unpaid taxes and water and sewage bills by September 1991. Hamlet was economically depressed and local officials, valuing the employment it gave to residents, chose to treat Imperial with "benign neglect", according to city manager Ron Niland. By 1990 the company was one of the largest private employers in Hamlet. Niland got into a dispute with Imperial that year after it was found to be dumping excess chicken grease into the municipal wastewater system. He threatened to close the plant, but dropped the matter after the company changed its wastewater disposal methods.

Roe acquired three additional meat processing plants in the late 1980s, taking on significant debt in the process. By 1990, the facility in Colorado had lost its largest customer and was operating below capacity, the facility in Cumming, Georgia had been damaged by two fires, and the plant in Alabama was forced to close after its contracted food broker rejected the low-quality nuggets it produced. Under pressure to recoup his losses and pay back his creditors, Roe devoted his attention to the Hamlet plant. He and Brad added a full second shift to increase production and sped up the line process. When repairs to equipment were necessary, Brad typically instructed the maintenance crew to improvise with spare parts to save money.

=== Safety concerns ===
The Hamlet plant experienced small fires in 1980, 1983, and 1987, but none resulted in safety inspections. One of these fires disabled the fire sprinkler system installed by Mello-Buttercup; it was never repaired. An automatic carbon dioxide fire extinguisher and hood were installed over the deep fryer vats after the 1983 incident. A state OSHA inspector visited the site several times in the 1980s to examine the small facility space leased to the plant's former owner, Mello-Buttercup, but did not visit any of Imperial's sections; the Imperial facility never underwent a workplace safety inspection.

Line workers were only given partial safety guidelines in their hiring orientation, which did not cover fire safety. The only managerial staffer possessing a state-issued OSHA safety booklet found its content confusing. One worker wrote a complaint to OSHA in October 1987 alleging the presence of maggots in the breakroom and lice and detritus in the women's restroom. Questioned by an OSHA officer, Hair denied these claims and no further action was taken. In 1991 the North Carolina General Assembly passed a law requiring all local governments to appoint a fire inspector by July 1 to examine all commercial buildings within their respective jurisdictions to ensure compliance with the new state fire code. The statute did not appropriate money for the purpose and many municipalities, including Hamlet, lacked the funds to appoint such an official. The Hamlet Fire Department also had no contingency firefighting plan for the Imperial plant.

Food safety inspectors from the United States Department of Agriculture (USDA) visited the plant daily to examine the quality of the chicken, check for insects and vermin, and ensure that the facility's workers and processes were hygienic. In 1989, the inspectors noticed a large number of flies entering the building near its loading dock and dumpster. To resolve this issue, in the summer of 1991 Imperial built a shed-like structure around the dumpster and trash compactor, without a permit. It had an interior door that opened from the plant to the dumpster and an exterior door that was to be locked from the outside at all times. The USDA approved the measure although the locked door violated workplace safety standards. One production line worker told a USDA inspector he had concerns about the facility's safety, but the inspector said that such issues were outside his purview. The maintenance worker who padlocked the door said Emmett Roe told him it was to keep workers from stealing chicken. While such thefts had occurred at the plant, this factor was later downplayed by other supervisors.

Other exits at the facility, including the breakroom exterior door, were also locked; of the plant's nine exterior doors, seven were locked or obstructed from the outside, including a padlocked one marked "Fire Exit Do Not Block". Only a handful of Imperial employees, mostly maintenance workers, were aware that the doors were locked. One maintenance worker stated that their request for a key to the locks was turned down. The plant did not have a fire evacuation plan, workers had never undergone a fire drill, and there was only one fire extinguisher near the fryer. There was also no fire alarm. One line worker suggested complaining about the lack of fire precautions to the managers, but her coworkers convinced her not to, saying it would jeopardize her employment. Most workers did not know that they could have complained to OSHA, or that the federal Occupational Health and Safety Act guaranteed protection from retaliatory firings for reporting safety concerns. The plant's lack of an emergency plan, lack of a fire alarm, and the locking and obstruction of doors all violated OSHA rules. State law also prohibited the locking of workplace doors.

Imperial experienced a string of safety issues with its Moosic plant in Pennsylvania in the 1980s. After a worker was severely burned by cooking oil in 1985, OSHA asked to inspect the plant. When Roe refused, the inspector obtained a search warrant and cited the corporation for several violations. Two years later, OSHA received an anonymous safety complaint, and upon further investigation found the Pennsylvania facility experienced twice the national rate of workplace injuries in food processing. An inspector again sought entry to the plant—which was refused—and obtained another search warrant. The inspector uncovered six violations and wrote in his report that Roe displayed "utter contempt for OSHA". A follow-up inspection recorded a total of 33 health and safety violations, including poorly marked and blocked emergency exits. Frustrated with the safety inspectors and a largely unionized workforce in Moosic, Roe closed the facility in 1989. The inspector noted the existence of the Hamlet plant on his report and suggested checking it, but nothing was done on this point. Because of Imperial's poor safety record, the company only obtained workers' compensation insurance in North Carolina from Liberty Mutual after being placed in the state's assigned risk pool.

== Fire ==
=== Hydraulic line repair ===
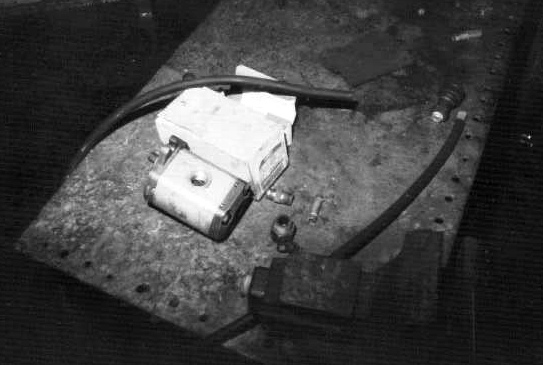
The remains of the failed hydraulic line

Over the Labor Day weekend of 1991, the plant's maintenance crew reviewed the hydraulic system of a conveyor belt which moved chicken tenders into a 29-foot-long (8.8 m), 300-gallon (1,135 litres) Stein fryer in the processing room. During the previous months one of the hydraulic lines—which connected the machine box to the belt—had periodically leaked. The plant's head mechanic, John Gagnon, asked Brad Roe for funds to purchase the specific line and connectors needed to replace the leaking hose. Roe consulted his father and denied the request, citing the high cost, and the maintenance crew instead used a spare line. Imperial workers began their shift after Labor Day at 8:00 a.m. on Tuesday, September 3, 1991. Of the 120 workers scheduled for the shift, 90 reported for work, and the other 30 were told not to come in due to ongoing repairs near the fryer. That morning the maintenance workers reconsidered their hydraulic repair, as the line they had used was longer than the standard part and the excess length lay on the floor; they figured it could be a tripping hazard.

The maintenance crew decided to shorten the line with a hacksaw and reconnect it to the machine box with an improvised connector. The line was rated to 3,000 pounds per square inch (21 MPa), while normal operating pressure never fluctuated higher than 1,500 psi (10 MPa). The Stein fryer's manual advised deactivation of its heat sources before handling flammable liquids around it, such as hydraulic fluid. The cooker's temperature was controlled by thermostat and was maintained at a constant 375 °F (191 °C), which was variable by design to 15 °F (8.3 °C) either way. The repairmen decided against deactivation, since it could take up to two hours for the fryer's furnace to heat back up to 375 °F, which would delay the plant's workflow and, they feared, likely anger Brad Roe.

=== Ignition and escape attempts ===
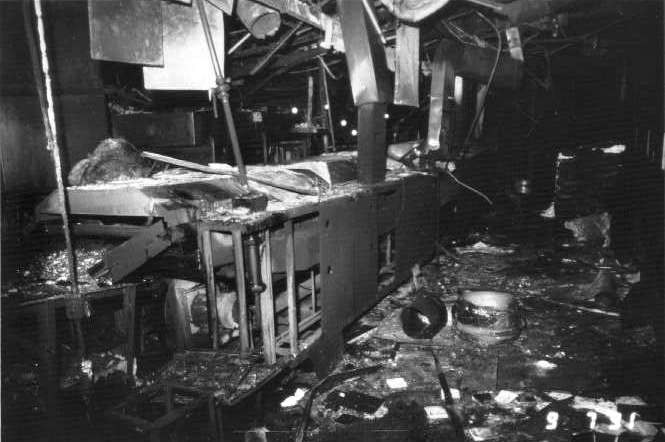
A view of the fryer where the fire started

The fire began at around 8:15 a.m., seconds after the mechanics turned the conveyor belt on. When the improvised connector was brought up to normal operating pressure, it separated from the line at 800–1,500 psi (5.5–10.3 MPa) and began wildly spraying hydraulic fluid. It spattered onto the heating lines for the fryer and immediately vaporized. This vapor went into the flame of the fryer and, because of its relatively low flash point, quickly ignited. The ruptured hydraulic line then pumped 50 to 55 US gal (190 to 210 L; 42 to 46 imp gal) of hydraulic fluid into the fire before electrical failure caused the pump to shut down. The fire kept growing, fueled by a combination of the hydraulic fluid, chicken grease (which coated the floor and walls of the processing room), and the fryer vats' soybean oil (which ignited after some delay due to the carbon dioxide fire suppression system and hood). Natural gas was added to the fire as well, when a gas regulator was burned and started leaking. Workers reported that the plant was engulfed in less than two minutes.

The fire was so hot that the facility's Kemlite ceiling tiles—designed to be fire-resistant—caught fire. Within a few minutes, the fire severed power and telephone lines and burned a hole in the factory roof. A gas line in the ceiling ruptured and caught fire; another later exploded. Large quantities of hydrocarbon-charged smoke—which has the potential to disable a person within a few breaths—were produced, obscuring visibility while the fire consumed massive amounts of oxygen, while also producing large amounts of toxic carbon monoxide. The plant had open spaces between rooms, in place of doors, to allow for easy access by forklifts, the only barriers being occasional curtains of plastic strips to hold in refrigerated air. This arrangement allowed the rapid spread of smoke and heat. The walls and floor were hard, smooth surfaces, which limited the amount of material available to absorb heat and smoke. The fire effectively split the facility; workers in the marinating and packing rooms were able to flee through the unlocked front door of the plant, while those in the processing and trim rooms were forced to retreat towards the breakroom, equipment room, loading dock, and dumpster. Seven workers were trapped by the flames in the processing room. Some workers suffered trauma injuries during the rush to escape.

Workers who fled toward the loading dock found the bay exit blocked by a tractor-trailer delivery truck, whose driver was asleep in its cab. The group that went to the breakroom tried to push an air conditioning unit out of a window. Failing to make an opening, some of them went to the loading dock and, finding the exit blocked, attempted to exit via the nearby doors, which were obstructed from the outside by a dumpster. Another set of doors nearby was padlocked from the outside; workers tried to kick their way through them. After this attempt, a group of workers retreated to a nearby cooler to avoid the smoke and flames, but its door would not fully shut and allowed carbon monoxide to seep into the compartment. Others stayed near the loading dock and dumpster.

=== Emergency response and casualties ===
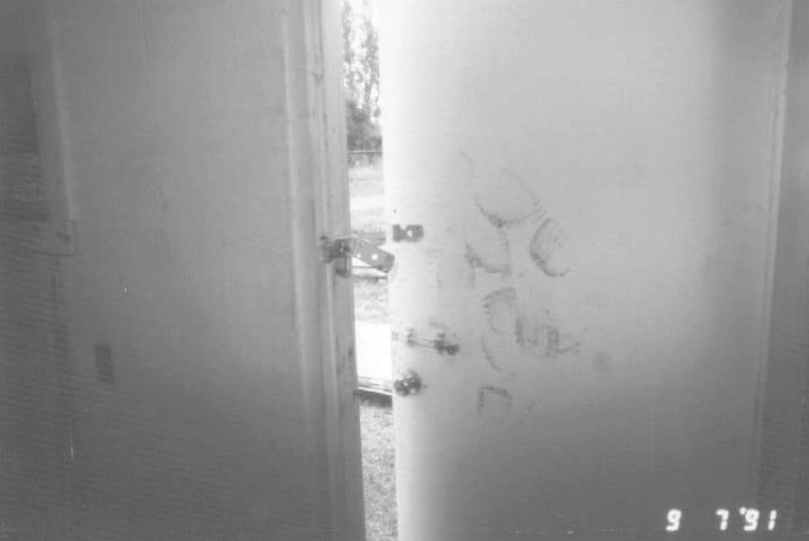
Footprints on the north breakroom door. A worker kicked open the door during the fire so he and his coworkers could escape.

Brad Roe attempted to call the fire department (Hamlet had no generalized 9-1-1 emergency dial system) but the telephone lines were inoperable. He then drove his car a few blocks over to the Hamlet Fire Department, arriving at 8:22 a.m.. Only two firefighters were on duty at the time, including Captain Calvin White. Roe told White, "We got a fire at Imperial Foods. Help us! Help us quick!" He did not mention that workers were still in the plant. Captain White responded to the incident at 8:24 a.m. and reached the scene three minutes later. Upon his arrival, White realized that the fire was serious and sent a mutual aid call to the Rockingham Fire Department. By this time about 20 workers were lying on the ground outside the facility; three were dead. Neighboring residents, hearing screams and seeing smoke from the plant, went to rouse the truck driver. Hamlet municipal workers chained the dumpster to a tractor and pulled it away from the building to create an opening for workers to escape. Imperial maintenance worker Bobby Quick eventually managed to kick open the north exterior door in the breakroom, rupturing discs in his spine in the process. This door allowed 10 workers to flee while Quick recovered a woman in a different room and led her outside. Another exit was opened by an employee from the outside.

The first two firefighters on scene administered oxygen to escaped plant workers and performed cardiopulmonary resuscitation on some. Once the first responders realized the extent of the emergency, they extended the mutual aid call to the East Rockingham and North Side Fire Departments. Hamlet Fire Chief David Fuller took charge of the emergency response. Fuller and the Hamlet Fire Department also asked for assistance from the Cordova Fire Department (located 8.5 miles, or 13.7 km, away), ostensibly because of their experience with complex fires. Additionally, Fuller appealed for assistance from Richmond County Emergency Medical Services units and rescue groups in Ellerbe and Hoffman. Over 100 medical and emergency service personnel ultimately went to the scene and local government resources were allocated under Hamlet's city disaster plan.

Assistance was never requested from the Dobbins Heights Volunteer Fire Department. Based in the largely African American community of Dobbins Heights, five minutes' driving distance from the fire, the department had many volunteers who knew Imperial workers. Upon hearing of the fire, most of the volunteers gathered at their station and Fire Chief Ernest Cannon called Fuller to tell him they were ready to assist. Fuller told Cannon that he would call if he needed their assistance, and never called back. Cannon attempted to call Fuller twice more before driving over to the plant. Once there, Fuller told him that he needed the Dobbins Heights firefighters on standby in case he thought they were needed at the Imperial facility, or if another fire or incident in Hamlet required their intervention.

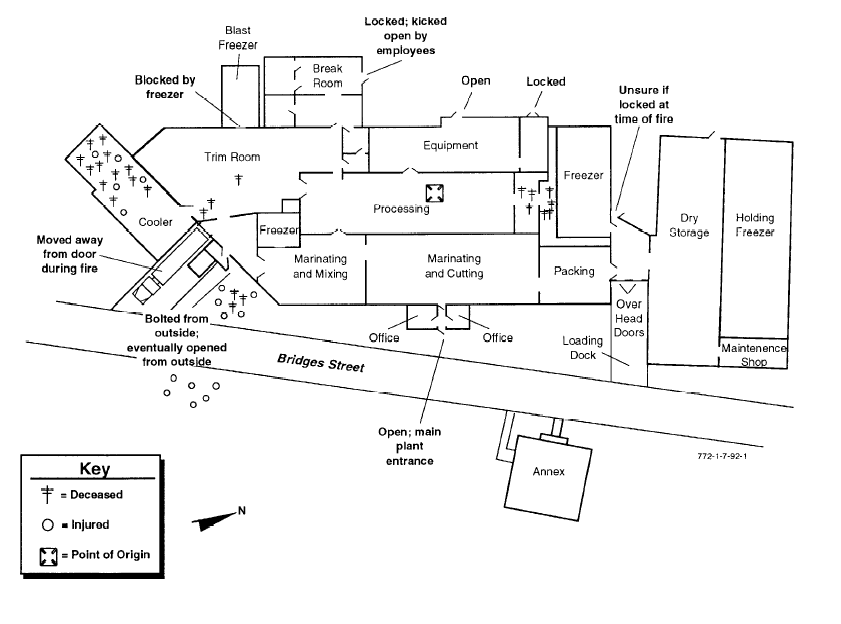
Floor plan of the factory showing the locations of the origin of the fire and of the killed and injured

More firefighters from Hamlet and throughout the county arrived and attempted to enter the building. The Hamlet Fire Department did not have a floorplan of the plant, and the fire suppression team was forced to fall back when the heat and smoke in the processing room proved too intense. The team reentered the building through the equipment room and brought the fire under control by 10:00 a.m., eventually using AFF foam to extinguish the blaze around the fryer oil vats. Search and rescue operations began at about 8:45 and ended after 12:20 p.m. when Gagnon was recovered in a final search of the building in a corner of the processing room near the freezer. Gagnon was still alive, and a doctor administered tracheotomy on site, but he died before reaching the hospital. Twelve bodies were recovered in the cooler near the loading dock. Five people there survived with injuries. Seven workers died north of the processing room, while three were killed in the trim room.

Rescuers bagged deceased victims on site and loaded them into a refrigerated tractor-trailer truck owned by the Hamlet Fire Department. Casualties totaled 25 dead and 54 injured to varying degrees. Of the dead, 18 were female and 7 were male. Most were poor. Of the plant workers who died, twelve were African American and twelve were white. A white delivery driver died while at the factory to restock vending machines, and was recognized on scene by his son, a firefighter. Autopsies indicated nearly all of the fatalities were caused by smoke inhalation, rather than direct flame injury. Air ambulances from Winston-Salem, Chapel Hill, Durham, and Charlotte collected some patients from the hospital in Hamlet and delivered them to burn units in their cities of origin. The next day, Shoney's sent a truck to pick up what chicken products could be salvaged.

== Aftermath ==
=== Reactions ===
Later on September 3, after news of the Hamlet fire had been broadcast, OSHA received an anonymous complaint about safety at Imperial's Georgia plant. OSHA took the unusual step of inspecting that plant the same day, and found an inoperative sprinkler system, improper fire exits, and no evacuation plan. They determined the plant posed an imminent danger to workers because it lacked an automatic fire extinguisher over its cooker and Imperial voluntarily suspended its operations, pending improvements. The Georgia plant resumed operations after creating an on-site fire brigade, but before installing new fire suppression systems, without objection from OSHA. Other food processing plants across the South also decided to review their fire precautions. Regional business figures distanced themselves from Roe and characterized his company as "rogue". The similarly-named Imperial Foods, a Goldsboro-based sandwich producer, changed its name to First Choice Foods to avoid confusion with Imperial Food Products.

The fire drew significant media attention, and journalists from across the country came to Hamlet. They extensively covered the fire's casualties and how it affected the town. Newspapers quickly investigated Roe's background and the history of OSHA enforcement in North Carolina, painting the incident as largely the result of a breakdown in regulatory enforcement. Emmett Roe was near Atlanta, Georgia at the time and arrived in Hamlet within 24 hours of the incident. A radio journalist asked him about the locked doors, but he denied any knowledge of them. Two reporters from The Charlotte Observer attempted to enter the Imperial office across the street from the factory and meet with Roe, but he ejected them and refused to identify himself. Hamlet Mayor Abbie Covington and others who interacted with Roe reported that he seemed emotionally distraught. A few days after his arrival he wrote a brief letter to the plant employees, referring to the fire as "the accident" and calling it a "tragedy". Meanwhile, Imperial's creditors demanded that their loans be repaid. Faced with these challenges, on October 9 Roe sent another letter to his workers, stating that the plant would not reopen due to Imperial's "inability to make an arrangement to finance its short- and long-term obligations".

=== Response criticism ===
Fuller was asked to evaluate the emergency response for investigators. He said there were more than sufficient numbers of personnel and equipment with regards to the layout of the incident site. Initially, when asked why he refused help from the Dobbins Heights volunteers, Fuller said, "You can get too much help." When asked similar questions on other occasions, Fuller suggested that the Dobbins Heights firefighters were not qualified to fight the plant fire and should have felt "honored" to be placed on standby. In response, Cannon maintained that his men could have assisted the rescue effort and said, "It was a racial thing. We are just as qualified as [Fuller's] volunteers. I know they're prejudiced. Hamlet has always looked at Dobbins Heights that way." Fuller denied the accusation, saying that the emergency response team was racially diverse and arguing that he had not asked for help from Dobbins Heights because they lacked "experienced personnel and leadership". Cannon spurned this explanation, and several black residents interviewed after the fire agreed the Dobbins Heights volunteers were not deployed because of racism. Disgruntled residents later referred to the dispute as "the firehouse incident".

When the North Carolina State Bureau of Investigation (SBI) interviewed Fuller, he reportedly told them that he knew about the locked door near the dumpster and believed it was necessary to keep plant workers from stealing. An Imperial maintenance supervisor, Kim Mangus, later swore in a notarized statement that he had supplied the Hamlet Fire Department with a key, and therefore believed that it was not a safety problem. Fuller stated publicly that his department did not have a key and did not need one, since the firefighters were equipped to make forced entries. Fuller later denied rumors that he had approved of the door's locking or that Imperial owners had bribed his men with free chicken tenders in exchange for ignoring their plant's issues.

=== Investigation ===
The SBI began an investigation into the fire on September 4. Workers who survived the disaster were interviewed. North Carolina Commissioner of Labor John C. Brooks denied OSHA access to the site. Investigators found indentations left on at least one door by people attempting to kick it down. Covington also asked North Carolina Deputy Commissioner of Insurance Timothy Bradley to conduct an investigation; his preliminary report of the state's findings was released on September 6. The report suggested that, were some of the exits not blocked, fewer workers would have died. Hamlet's medical director stated that if the plant had met safety standards, 24 of the 25 killed workers would have survived. The SBI ultimately assigned 14 agents to the case, who put in 1,800 hours of work and compiled a 2,500-page report on the fire. The North Carolina Department of Labor concluded, "The only priority of management was production and complying with USDA requirements." Asked by reporters why the USDA had ignored the fire safety issues, the agency's chief inspections administrator stated that the food inspectors were not trained to observe fire violations or responsible to report them. Brooks blamed his own department's failure to inspect the plant on shortages of money and staff, and chided the federal government for not enforcing stricter standards.

The United States Fire Administration also compiled a report. It recommended that "life safety codes must be enforced" and suggested that inspectors from different state and federal agencies be cross-trained to recognize safety violations.

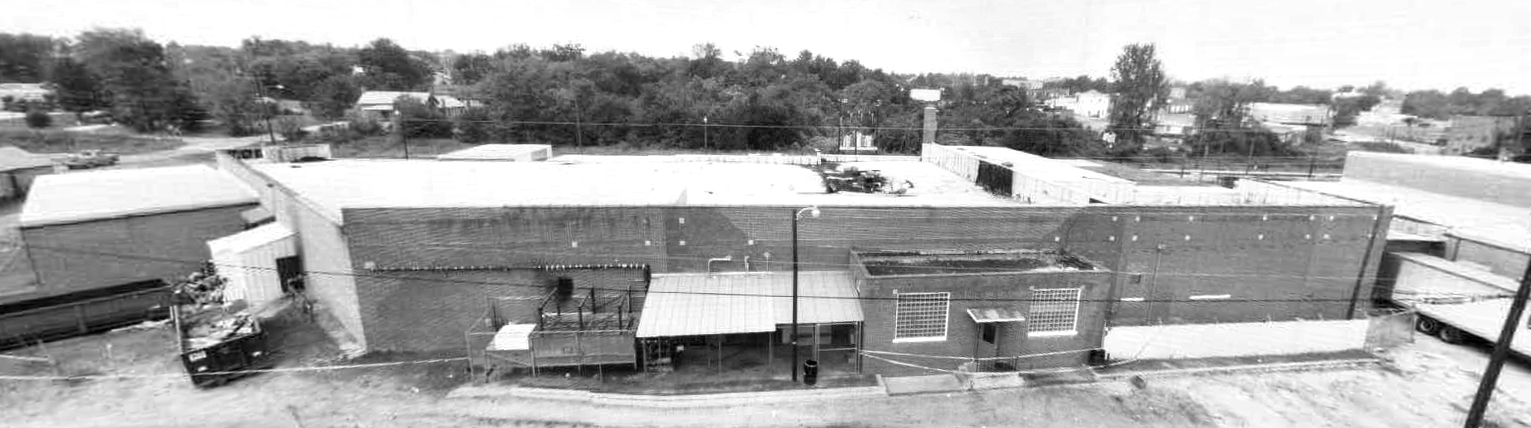
A view of the plant taken from a ladder across the street, showing a collapsed section of roof directly above the origin of the fire. Photo taken from the Fire Administration report

=== Criminal proceedings and litigation ===
Bradley's initial assessment of the situation at the plant—including the locked doors—was presented to Hamlet's municipal government a few days after the fire. Mayor Covington and Fire Chief Fuller asked for criminal charges to be filed. PhilaPosh, a Philadelphia-based union worker safety organization, printed mock wanted posters with Roe's face and accusing him of murder, and joined with other labor advocacy groups in launching a petition to arrest him. Brooks also recommended that district prosecutor Carroll Lowder pursue homicide charges against the plant's operators. Lowder convened a grand jury to consider charges against the Roes, Hair, and Mangus. The jury voted against charging Mangus, but on March 10, 1992, it indicted the Roes and Hair on 25 counts each for involuntary manslaughter. They surrendered to authorities three days later.

For his defense, Emmett Roe hired attorney Joseph B. Cheshire V. According to his own account, Cheshire drove to Lowder's office to discuss some aspects of the case and investigate his chances at securing a plea bargain for Roe. Lowder was allegedly dismissive of the deceased plant workers, emphasizing cases of theft from the plant and calling them "a bunch of low-down black folks". There was no criminal trial. Emmett Roe entered a plea bargain with the prosecutor, and on September 14, 1992, pled guilty to all the manslaughter charges; no charges were pursued against his son or Hair. He was sentenced to 19 years and 11 months in prison, eligible for parole in less than five years. Many former plant workers and affected families were dissatisfied with the sentence. Roe became eligible for parole in March 1994, and was released just under four years into his sentence, retiring to Georgia in obscurity.

As a result of the official investigation into the fire, the North Carolina Department of Labor imposed a $808,150 (equivalent to $1,910,298 in 2025) fine on Imperial Food Products for 83 OSHA violations, the highest such penalty in the state's history. Roe initially denounced the large citation as "absurd" and alleged that it was imposed to impress federal authorities and keep them from taking over the state-enforced OSHA program. He later wrote to the Department of Labor that "My knowledge of the operation led me to believe it was a safe place to work." Imperial ultimately declared bankruptcy and thus the fine was never paid.

Lawyers flocked to Hamlet after the fire, and by December 1991 most survivors' and victims' families had retained attorneys. By early 1992, over 100 lawsuits had been filed against the Roes and Imperial. Emmett Roe declared personal bankruptcy and underwent proceedings in bankruptcy court beginning in August 1992, claiming in court that he had no cash or assets of significant value. This assertion was ultimately confirmed by the court. Victims' legal teams then focused their efforts on obtaining payments from Imperial's insurers: American International Group, U.S. Fire Insurance Company, and Liberty Mutual. Liberty Mutual paid out workers' compensation, but the three insurers initially refused to pay out more because plant conditions were so unsafe. By December 1992, a settlement was reached awarding $16.1 million to the victims; payouts of $175,000 to $1 million were awarded for individual wrongful death claims; settlements ranging from $2,500 to over $1 million were awarded in 77 injury cases. Survivors and their families filed another suit in 1993 against 41 other companies, including Stein (the fryer manufacturer) and Kemlite (the ceiling tile producer), for contributing to the disaster. The judge eventually awarded the plaintiffs $24 million, of which each got $35,000 to $70,000 after deducting court expenses.

One group of plaintiffs sued Hamlet's municipal government, claiming that the fire department had failed to inspect the plant and that delays on the day of the disaster had contributed to the death toll. With the support of the city council, city insurer Harleysville Group settled and paid the plaintiffs $250,000 to $500,000. Others sued the North Carolina Department of Labor, alleging that negligence by the state entitled victims to compensation pursuant to the North Carolina Tort Claims Act. The North Carolina Supreme Court ultimately ruled in a 5–2 vote that, though the department's failure to inspect the Imperial plant was neglectful, it was "not the kind of negligence for which damages can be collected".

=== Government reform ===
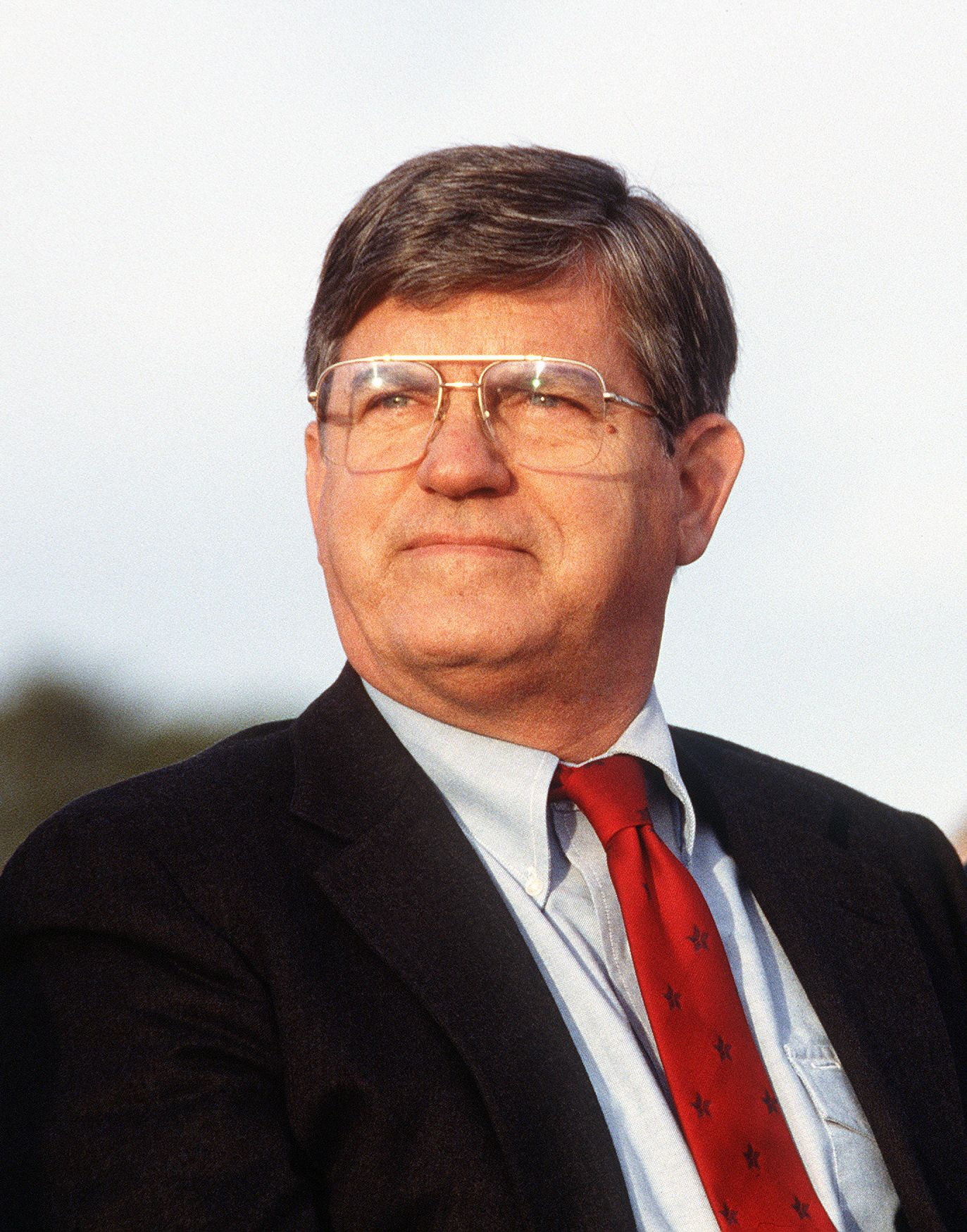
North Carolina Governor James G. Martin (pictured) proposed funds to hire more safety inspectors, the creation of a state fire inspections team, the establishment of a safety violation helpline, and the cross-training of USDA workers so that they could report safety problems.

Asked about the fire, North Carolina Governor James G. Martin suggested that the state did not need significant changes to its labor practices and deflected responsibility onto Brooks, accusing him of not exercising proper oversight as labor commissioner. Sensing growing public outrage, Martin modified his position a few days later, proposing funding for 24 more safety inspectors, the creation of a state fire inspections team, the establishment of a helpline to report safety violations, and the cross-training of USDA workers so that they could recognize and report safety problems. He rejected the AFL–CIO's suggestion that responsibility for OSHA enforcement in the state be returned to the federal government, denouncing such an action as a potential "intrusion".

On September 20, Brooks met with OSHA officials. He asked them to match Governor's Martin's funding increases towards labor inspections and that they temporarily loan 24 inspectors to the state until North Carolina could train its own personnel. OSHA shortly thereafter negotiated an agreement with the state to assume jurisdiction over all discrimination complaints in the private sector. On October 4, the federal agency asked Brooks to approve several changes to the state-enforced OSHA program which would strengthen federal officials' enforcement powers. Brooks refused, and on October 23 OSHA unilaterally altered the terms of the regime, dispatching 14 of its own inspectors to North Carolina to act independently of the state program, an action it had never taken before.

On January 9, 1992, United States Secretary of Labor Lynn Martin set a deadline of 90 days for North Carolina state officials to improve enforcement of job safety and health regulations, or federal agencies would take over. The North Carolina General Assembly passed 14 new worker safety laws as a result, including whistleblower protections. The inspector corps was increased from 60 to 114 personnel and the minimum penalty for willful violations of safety standards was increased. In May 1992 Brooks faced a contested Democratic Party primary from Harry E. Payne Jr., a legislator who criticized Brooks for ineffectiveness. Payne won the election and promised to strengthen the Department of Labor. As he finished his term, Brooks remained defensive of the department's actions before the fire and praised the state government's reform, saying, "These are unparalleled initiatives. The image problem will correct itself over time." Average penalties for state-observed safety violations doubled that year.

The fire prompted OSHA to review 22 state-run enforcement programs and launch a national campaign to alert employers about the necessity of fire safeguards, including alarms, sprinklers, and unlocked exits. The United States House Committee on Education and Labor also held hearings on the fire and concluded that both OSHA's and North Carolina's enforcement of safety standards were ineffective. Committee chairman William D. Ford stated that he had offered increased appropriations to OSHA in the wake of the disaster, but he was turned away by the secretary of labor. Representative Charlie Rose threatened to introduce a bill which would require food inspectors to look for safety issues. In 1994 the USDA and OSHA reached an agreement whereby USDA food safety inspectors would be trained to recognize and report workplace safety violations to OSHA. As of 2021, there is no evidence that a USDA food inspector has ever forwarded a notice to OSHA.

=== Effects on Hamlet ===
Direct response to the fire cost the city of Hamlet $30,000 in policing expenses, $10,000 in lost firefighting equipment, and $8,000 in administrative costs. The Imperial plant was permanently closed, with the loss of 215 jobs. A total of 49 children were orphaned. The city council recognized 30 days of mourning and ordered flags to be flown at half-staff. Condolences from across the country were mailed to the city hall.

Over 15 government agencies and nonprofit groups—including the North Carolina Division of Employment Security Commission, North Carolina Bar Association, Richmond County United Way, and Hamlet Ministerial Alliance—coordinated the establishment of a Victim's Assistance Center to provide emergency aid and unemployment benefits to surviving workers and to victims' families. Other relief funds were supplied by the labor unions including the AFL–CIO, the Social Security Administration, and Liberty Mutual, Imperial's casualty insurer. Several national corporations, local businesses, and volunteers offered money and other resources to help the victims. The Employment Security Commission funded the creation of education and job training programs for fire survivors to help them find other employment, but by September 1992 it was estimated that only about 20 of the survivors had found new jobs.

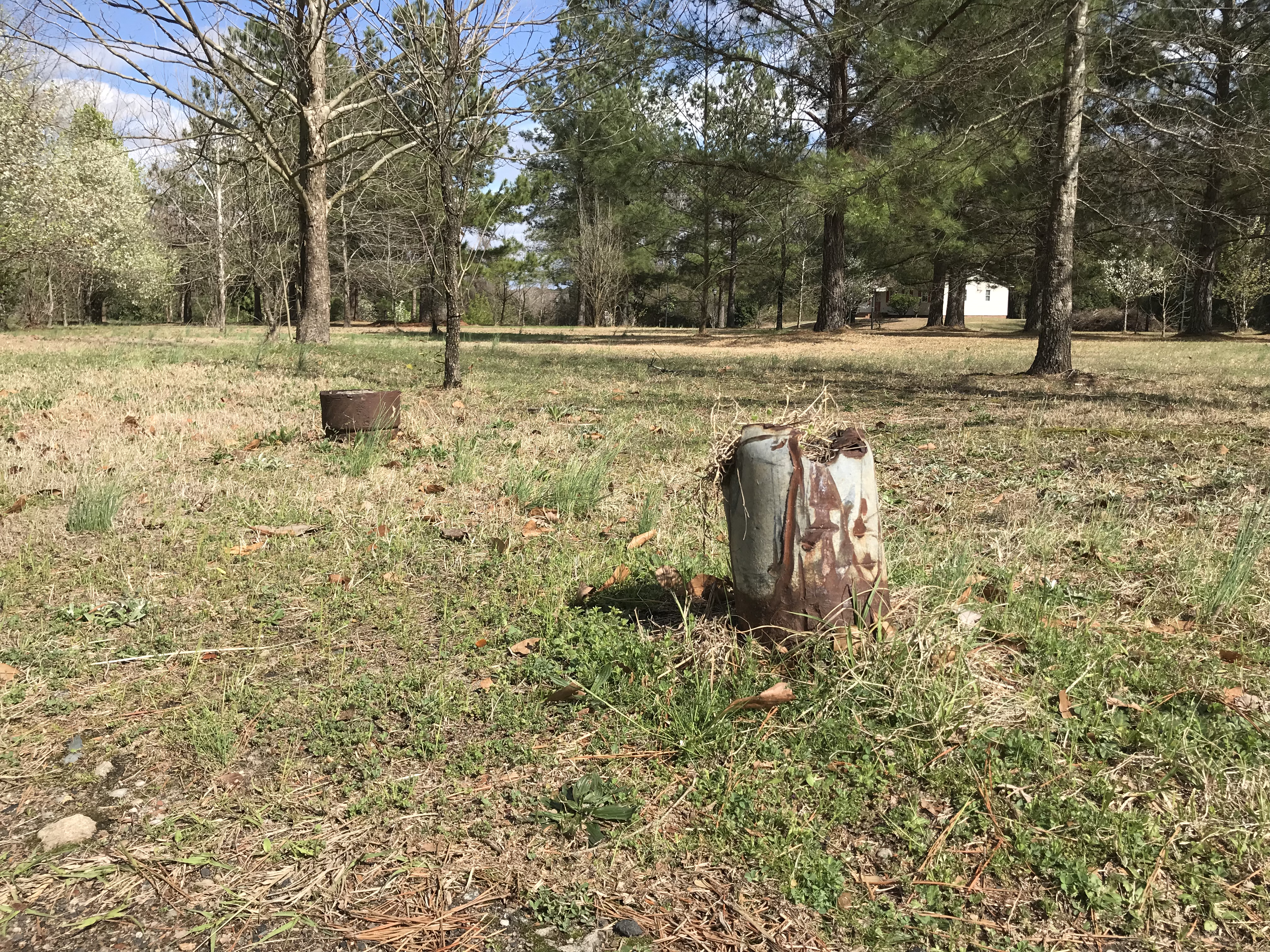
Piping at the former Imperial Food Products site in 2022. The site was cleared in 2002.

Fire survivors suffered long-term adverse health effects due to the incident, including respiratory ailments, muscular injuries, and cognitive impairments. Because of the town's small size, many Hamlet firefighters knew some or all of the victims, and suffered psychological problems. Between 50 and 60 people attended counseling sessions afterwards. Psychologists discovered high rates of anxiety and behaviors associated with post-traumatic stress disorder (PTSD) among survivors and victims' families. A 1997 self-report study of children in the area, then between the ages of 10 and 16, found that the level of post-traumatic stress symptoms rose depending on how much exposure they had to the fire, that African American children were more at risk than white ones, and girls were more at risk than boys. By 2000, some survivors had died from complications of their injuries. Others became addicted to drugs (including painkillers) and alcohol, and some became involved in intense domestic disputes over money received from awarded damages and lawsuit settlements.

In the years after the disaster, former workers and members of the African American community, including former school principal Allen Mask and minister Tommy Legrand, appealed to the city to bulldoze the plant ruins, saying the structure had negative psychological impacts on locals and posed a potential physical health hazard to the public. Several psychologists who studied the survivors believed that the plant acted as a trauma trigger for former workers who were suffering from PTSD. Municipal officials initially asked the Roes to clean up the site, but they did not respond and were financially unable to oblige. City leaders refused to pay for a demolition themselves due to budget concerns, but Mask's and Legrand's lobbying efforts got the attention of State Senator Wayne Goodwin and U.S. Representative Robin Hayes in the late 1990s. Hayes convinced the U.S. Congress to offer the city a $50,000 grant to clean up the site, but municipal officials declined the grant and did not begin cleanup, the city attorney citing "unresolved liability issues". In August 2002 Goodwin and a PTSD researcher convinced the state health director to declare the Imperial facility a "public nuisance". The General Assembly appropriated $78,000 to remove the plant ruins, and over the following months the site was cleared and eventually turned into a park. Hamlet spent a total of $13 million from federal and state grants, both on cleaning up the site and on related efforts aimed at economic revitalization.

== Legacy ==
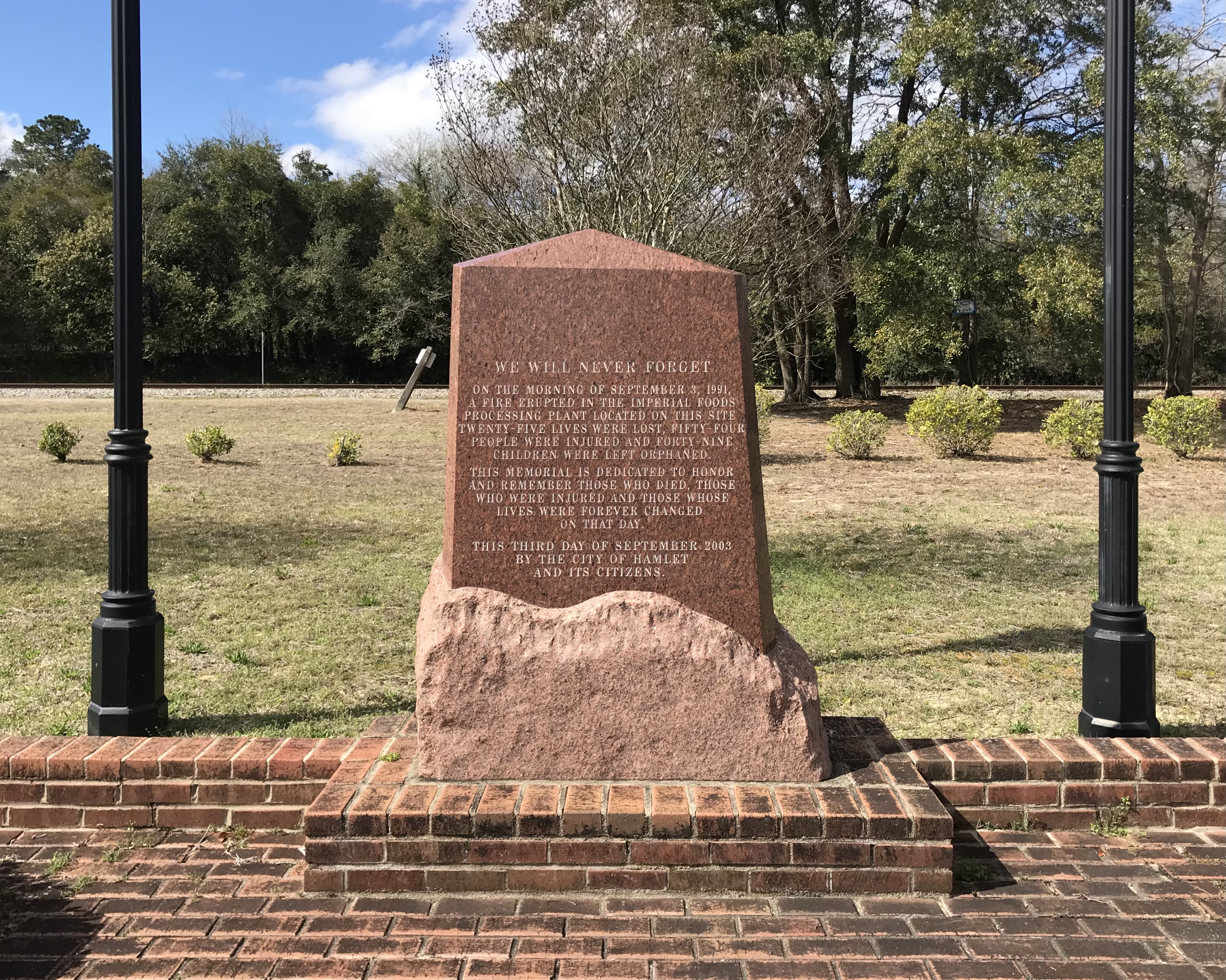
Fire memorial at the former plant site

In 1992 a ceremony was held at Hamlet's City Lake marking the first anniversary of the fire. Hosted by Mayor Covington, and attended by a mostly white audience, the event concluded with the unveiling of a granite monument marked with the deceased victims' names. A separate commemoration was held at a Hamlet church with politician and minister Jesse Jackson as the main speaker to a mostly African American crowd. This ceremony produced a second monument. Covington and the city council formally declined to invite Jackson to the lake-side ceremony, believing he would politicize the affair and heighten racial tensions. Some members of the African American community thought that city leaders were ignoring their concerns and that the fire had only revealed racial differences that already existed. A third monument was later erected at the former plant site.

Jello Biafra and Mojo Nixon wrote a song about the incident called "Hamlet Chicken Plant Disaster" and included it on their 1994 album Prairie Home Invasion. A fictional novel on the subject, A Southern Tragedy, in Crimson and Yellow, was written by Lawrence Naumoff and published in 2005. Howard L. Craft wrote a fictional play debuting in 2017 based on the experiences of some of Imperial's female workers.

This fire was the second-worst industrial disaster in North Carolina history in death toll, behind the 1925 Coal Glen mine disaster. Unlike other industrial disasters in American history, such as the 1911 Triangle Shirtwaist Factory fire, public interest in the Hamlet fire quickly faded. Roe's manslaughter conviction was either ignored by major newspapers or only briefly mentioned. Historian Bryant Simon wrote that unlike the 1911 disaster, the Hamlet fire "didn't fundamentally change the conversation in the state or the nation. It didn't make us see the world in a different way. It did not really bring the people who do the dirty work [...] into view. It didn't change these lives on the shop floor. It didn't involve a fundamental shift in spending or priorities."

Simon argued that the Hamlet fire broke out "because the nation, not just this place or these people, had essentially given up on protecting its most vulnerable [...] Above all, America became dominated by the idea [...] of cheap [...] those with power valued cheap food, cheap government, and cheap lives over quality ingredients, investment in human capital, and strong oversight and regulation. But the policies of cheap came at a cost, as this story of the fire at Imperial Food Products in 1991 makes clear". The Heritage Foundation fellow John Hood argued, "The Hamlet fire, and a few other workplace disasters, are tragic and make good copy or news footage, but they tell us virtually nothing about worker safety in the United States. And the reality is that worker safety has been improving for decades."

== Works cited ==
- Chapman, James H. (2017). The Deep River Coalfield: Two Hundred Years of Mining in Chatham County, North Carolina. Jefferson: McFarland & Company. ISBN 9781476668987.
- Dixon, Patrick M. (2015). The Hamlet factory fire and the political economy of poultry in the twentieth century (PhD thesis). Georgetown University. OCLC 936815938.
- Fishwick, Tony (April 2018). "The Hamlet chicken processing plant fire—outcomes and good practices for avoiding a recurrence" (PDF). Loss Prevention Bulletin (260). Institution of Chemical Engineers: 6–10.
- Ford, William D., ed. (December 1991). The Tragedy at Imperial Food Products : Committee on Education and Labor, House of Representatives. Washington D.C.: U.S. Government Printing Office. ISBN 9780160371257.
- Govekar, Paul L.; Govekar, Michele A. (2006). "A tale of two fires: igniting social expectations for managers' responsibility". Journal of Management History. 12 (1): 90–99. doi:10.1108/13552520610638292.
- Klem, Thomas J. (January 1992). "25 Die in Food Plant Fire". NFPA Journal. 86 (1). National Fire Protection Association: 29–35. ISSN 1054-8793.
- LaBar, Gregg (September 1992). "Hamlet, N.C.: Home to a National Tragedy". Occupational Hazards. 54 (9). Penton: 29–31, 33–34. ISSN 0029-7909.
- March, John S.; Amaya-Jackson, Lisa; Terry, Robert; Costanzo, Philip (August 1997). "Posttraumatic Symptomatology in Children and Adolescents After an Industrial Fire". Journal of the American Academy of Child and Adolescent Psychiatry. 36 (8): 1080–1088. doi:10.1097/00004583-199708000-00015. PMID 9256587. Also cited by Weissbecker, Inka; Sephton, Sandra E.; Martin, Meagan B.; Simpson, David M. (2008). "Psychological and Physiological Correlates of Stress in Children Exposed to Disaster: Current Research and Recommendations for Intervention". Children, Youth and Environments. 18 (1): 30–70. doi:10.1353/cye.2008.0038. JSTOR 10.7721/chilyoutenvi.18.1.0030.
- McAteer, J. Davitt; Whiteman, Lily (1993). "Learning from Hamlet: The Case for a National Safety and Health Board". New Solutions: A Journal of Environmental and Occupational Health Policy. 3 (2): 54–59. Bibcode:1993NewSo...3...54M. doi:10.2190/NS3.2.j. PMID 22910828. S2CID 10490978.
- Simon, Bryant (2020). The Hamlet Fire: A Tragic Story of Cheap Food, Cheap Government, and Cheap Lives. Chapel Hill: The University of North Carolina Press. ISBN 9781469661377.
- Wright, John P.; Cullen, Francis T.; Blankenship, Michael B. (January 1995). "The Social Construction of Corporate Violence: Media Coverage of the Imperial Food Products Fire". Crime & Delinquency. 41 (1): 20–36. doi:10.1177/0011128795041001002. S2CID 146183231.
- Yates, Jack (September 1991). Chicken Processing Plant Fires: Hamlet, North Carolina and North Little Rock, Arkansas (PDF). U.S. Fire Administration/Technical Report Series 057. United States Fire Administration. Archived from the original (PDF) on January 5, 2022.
