= Wesley Jones =

Wesley Jones may refer to:

- Wesley Livsey Jones (1863–1932), U.S. Representative and Senator from Washington state
- Wesley N. Jones (1852–1928), American politician in North Carolina
- Wes Jones (born 1958), American architect, educator and author
