= Love Me, Love Me Not (game show) =

- Genre: Game show
- Created by: Steve Carlin
- Directed by: Stan Litke
- Presented by: Ross Shafer
- Narrated by: Jane MacDougall (earlier episodes); Marilyn Smith (later episodes)
- Country of origin: Canada
- Original language: English
- No. of seasons: 1
- No. of episodes: 130

Production
- Executive producers: Steve Carlin; Blair Murdoch
- Producers: Blair Murdoch; Mark Phillips
- Production locations: CKVU-TV; Vancouver, British Columbia
- Camera setup: Multi-camera
- Running time: 22–24 minutes
- Production companies: Northstar Syndications Inc. Entertainment Planning Corporation; MGM Entertainment Co.

Original release
- Network: CKVU; USA Network
- Release: September 29, 1986 – September 11, 1987

Related
- Love Me, Love Me Not (UK version)

Love Me, Love Me Not is a Canadian game show based on the Italian game show, M'ama non m'ama, which in English means "love me, love me not". Both shows were created by Steve Carlin, the producer of The $64,000 Question in the 1950s. In 1988 there was a British version of the show, with the same name.

The program originally aired in Canada in 1986 and debuted on the USA Network in the United States on September 29, 1986. Ross Shafer was the host and Jane MacDougall was the co-host/announcer; MacDougall was later replaced by Marilyn Smith.

The series was the first game show to be produced by Blair Murdoch and was taped at CKVU-TV in Vancouver, British Columbia, Canada. Kathy Morse worked on the show as an assistant to the producers and later became the mayor of Maple Ridge, British Columbia.

A 1984 pilot was hosted by Alex Trebek.

== Gameplay ==
Two contestants of the same sex competed, facing a panel of three members of the opposite sex. Each game alternated between men "chasing" women and women chasing men. The two members of the same sex competed to capture panel members, who, in turn, did their best to avoid capture.

In round one panelists started with $100. The champion contestant chose one of the three panelists, who asked a "true/false" question pertaining to topics such as love, sex and relationships. The contestant was required to correctly judge the truth of the statement in order to capture the panelist. Otherwise, the panelist received another $100. The challenger would then undertake the same process with one of the remaining panelists, while the champion attempted to capture the remaining panelist.

For round two, starting with the challenger, each contestant attempted to capture the un-captured panelists. In this round, if a contestant failed, the panelist was given $200 (later avoiding a capture was worth $100, a total that increased to $200 if all three of the panelists were captured). Once all three panelists were captured, each contestant tried to capture one of their opponent's panelists until one contestant captured all three. The game limited the competition to ten questions (this total was nine, if the champion was ahead when all three panelists were first captured). The winner received $1,000 and, together with the panelist with the most money, advanced to the bonus round, the "Chase Around the Daisy." The winning panelist kept his/her money, while the others each received $100 and remained on the panel until having played five games, or advancing to the endgame.

If the two contestants were tied after twelve questions (originally ten), the hostess asked a question with a numerical answer. The champion was required to provide a guess, and the challenger had to determine if the correct answer was higher or lower. Challengers won the game with a correct answer.

If two or three panelists were tied with the most money, each panelist in turn read the winning contestant a statement. If either one fooled the contestant, that panelist received $100. Otherwise, the contestant received a $100 bonus. This continued until the tie was broken or until all questions were exhausted. At this point, if two panelists were tied, the contestant closer to the left gave the first guess to the numerical question and the other determined if the correct answer was higher or lower. If all three panelists were still tied, they were given ten seconds to write down their best guess to a question with a numerical answer. The winning panelist received an extra $100.

=== Chase Around the Daisy ===
The winning contestant and panelist played on a giant daisy structure consisting of eight petals, numbered clockwise from 1 to 8. The contestant started at petal #1 and the panelist started on petal #6. The host asked the contestant a series of true/false questions and the contestant advanced one petal for each correct answer, while the panelist advanced one petal for an incorrect answer. The contestant had to catch the panelist within a time limit: originally 50 seconds, later 45, and then 40. Successful contestants won a new car. If time ran out, the panelist won $100 of the contestant's $700 for each petal that separated them in whichever direction was the greater distance. Later, the contestant did not receive money for failing to capture the panelist. If the panelist caught the contestant due to too many incorrect responses, the game ended and the panelist received $1,400, which was later changed to a week's vacation in Hawaii. The panelist returned as the next game's challenger regardless of the outcome and contestants remained on the program until eliminated or until the bonus round was won, in which case the contestant they defeated became the new champion.

== International versions ==
Country	Local Title	Host(s)	Network	Year aired
Italy (original format)	M'ama non m'ama	Marco Predolin and Sabina Ciuffini (1983–1984); Marco Predolin and Ramona Dell'Abate (1984–1985); Sebastiano Somma and Simona Tagli (1987–1988)	Rete 4 Odeon TV	1983–1985; 1987–1988
Italy (original format)	Ma quanto mi ami?	Marco Predolin and Sabina Ciuffini	Italia 7	1994
United Kingdom	Love Me, Love Me Not	Nino Firetto and Debbie Greenwood	ITV	May 5 – September 13, 1988
United States	M'ama non M'ama	Alex Trebek	ABC	1984 (Two pilots)
