= Frank Crane (labor official) =

American civil servant and labor official

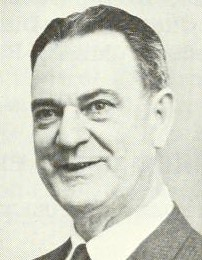

18th Labor Commissioner of North Carolina
- In office June 3, 1954 – 1973
- Preceded by: Forrest H. Shuford
- Succeeded by: William C. Creel

Personal details
- Born: August 18, 1907 near Waxhaw, North Carolina, United States
- Died: December 25, 1973 (aged 66) Raleigh, North Carolina
- Party: Democratic Party
- Education: University of North Carolina at Chapel Hill

Frank L. Crane (August 18, 1907 – December 25, 1973) was an American civil servant who served as the North Carolina Commissioner of Labor from June 3, 1954, to 1973.

== Early life ==
Frank Crane was born on August 18, 1907, near Waxhaw, North Carolina, United States to James Thomas Crane and Mary Emma Lathan. He attended Marvin Elementary School, Weddington Institute, and Prospect High School, graduating from the latter in 1927. He earned a bachelor's degree from the University of North Carolina at Chapel Hill in 1931. He then took courses at the university's summer school from 1931 to 1934 and attended classes in personnel management at North Carolina State College in 1939.

Crane married Edith Peacock on January 1, 1938. The two had no children and separated in 1961. Crane subsequently married Mary Browning Comer.

== Career ==
From 1931 to 1934 Crane worked as an athletic instructor at Welcome High School in Davidson County. He then worked as the safety director for the North Carolina Industrial Commission until 1938, when he became an administrative assistant for the North Carolina Employment Service. In 1939 he was hired by the North Carolina Department of Labor as a factory wage and hour inspector. In 1941 Crane became Director of the department's Conciliation and Arbitration Division.

On June 3, 1954, Crane was appointed by Governor William B. Umstead to serve as North Carolina Commissioner of Labor, filling in a vacancy created by the death of the previous incumbent, Forrest H. Shuford. A member of the Democratic Party, he won election on November 2, 1954. He was reelected to a full four-year term in 1956 and was further reelected in 1960, 1964, and 1968. He declared his decision not to run again for office on January 18, 1972, citing "entirely personal" reasons. He supported William C. Creel's candidacy to succeed him. Crane held the record for longest tenure as North Carolina Labor Commissioner until he was surpassed by Cherie Berry in 2019.

Crane suffered a heart attack while gardening at his home and subsequently died in the morning on December 25, 1973, at Rex Hospital in Raleigh, North Carolina.

== Works cited ==
- North Carolina Manual. Raleigh: North Carolina Secretary of State. 1971. OCLC 436873840.

Party political offices
Preceded by Forrest H. Shuford	Democratic nominee for North Carolina Commissioner of Labor; 1954, 1956, 1960, 1964, 1968	Succeeded by William C. Creel
