= Love Me, Love Me Not (British game show) =

British game show

- Genre: Game show
- Created by: Steve Carlin
- Presented by: Nino Firetto; Debbie Greenwood
- Country of origin: United Kingdom
- Original language: English
- No. of series: 1
- No. of episodes: 20

Production
- Running time: 30 minutes (inc. adverts)
- Production company: TVS in association with Talbot Television

Original release
- Network: ITV
- Release: 5 May – 13 September 1988

Related
- Love Me, Love Me Not (Canadian version)

Love Me, Love Me Not is a British game show based on the Canadian version of the same name. It aired on ITV from 5 May to 13 September 1988 and hosted by Nino Firetto and Debbie Greenwood.
