= Forrest H. Shuford =

American civil servant

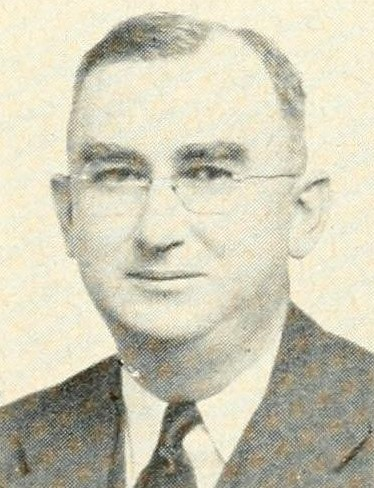

17th Labor Commissioner of North Carolina
- In office September 12, 1938 – May 19, 1954
- Preceded by: Arthur L. Fletcher
- Succeeded by: Frank Crane

Personal details
- Born: June 3, 1897; Lawndale, North Carolina, U.S.
- Died: May 19, 1954 (aged 56); Washington, D. C., U.S.
- Political party: Democratic Party

Forrest Herman Shuford (June 3, 1897 – May 19, 1954) was an American civil servant who served as North Carolina Commissioner of Labor from 1938 to 1954.

== Early life ==
Forrest Shuford was born on June 3, 1897, in Lawndale, North Carolina, United States to J. M. Shuford and Ella Copeland Shuford. He was educated in Cleveland County public schools and graduated from Piedmont High School in Lawndale. He enlisted in the United States Navy on June 3, 1918 and served during World War I. On June 3, 1922, he married May Renfrow. Though he was raised as a Methodist Christian, his wife was an Episcopalian and he switched to her denomination following their marriage. They had two sons.

Shuford attended Berea College in Berea, Kentucky, for three years. Afterwards, he studied textiles for a year at North Carolina State College of Agriculture and Engineering, before moving to New England to work at textile mills in Harrisville, Rhode Island. He subsequently moved to Gastonia, North Carolina, to become assistant superintendent of Groves Mills. He left the job after contracting tuberculosis, for which he was treated at Oteen Veterans Administration Hospital, and became a school teacher. Shuford served as principal of Ellenboro High School from 1924 to 1925 and Spindale School from 1925 to 1926 before moving to High Point, where he worked as the city's Boys' Commissioner from 1925 until 1933. That year he was hired by North Carolina Commissioner of Labor Arthur L. Fletcher as Chief Inspector in the Department of Labor. He was granted a leave of absence from the department from 1934 to 1935 to serve as the National Recovery Administration Labor Compliance Officer for North Carolina.

== Political career ==
Shuford was a member of the Democratic Party. In 1938 Fletcher resigned as Commissioner of Labor. North Carolina Governor Clyde Hoey appointed Shuford to fill the vacancy on September 12, as he was the most senior official within the labor department. He would subsequently be elected to four terms in the office. In 1944 he, at the direction of President Franklin D. Roosevelt, served as Advisor to American Governmental Delegates at an International Labour Organization conference in Philadelphia. In 1947 he served on the federal Bureau of Labor's Standards Safety Advisory Committee. Shuford died on May 19, 1954, at a hospital in Washington D. C. after being stricken by heart trouble while attending a conference on migrant labor.

== Works cited ==
- North Carolina Manual. Raleigh: North Carolina Secretary of State. 1947. OCLC 436873840.

Party political offices
Preceded by Arthur L. Fletcher	Democratic nominee for North Carolina Commissioner of Labor; 1938, 1940, 1944, 1948, 1952	Succeeded by Frank Crane
