= First Class (game show) =

- Genre: Game show
- Presented by: Louise Bachelor; Debbie Greenwood
- Theme music composer: "Platinum Part One: Airborne" by Mike Oldfield
- Country of origin: United Kingdom
- Original language: English
- No. of series: 4
- No. of episodes: 66 (inc. 3 specials)

Production
- Running time: 30 minutes
- Production company: BBC Scotland (1986–88)

Original release
- Network: BBC Scotland (1984); BBC1 (1986–88)
- Release: 3 October 1984 – 21 August 1988

First Class is a British game show that originally aired as a regional programme for BBC Scotland from 3 October to 19 December 1984 with Louise Bachelor as host. It was then networked on BBC1 with broadcasts from 8 January 1986 to 21 August 1988 with Debbie Greenwood as host.

== Format ==
The show was two teams of three students (each team representing a particular school) would take part in a multi-format quiz featuring questions on both general knowledge and popular culture, as well as innovative video game rounds. Rounds such as the "Spinning Gold Disc" made use of a simulated computer display similar to other game shows of the same era, such as Blockbusters and Catchphrase. Other rounds such as "Word of Mouth" used a real computer display from a BBC Micro. This computer also provided the on-screen captions and scores and was nicknamed Eugene, after the show's original programmer Eugene Crozier.

The competition was a knockout tournament; the eventual winners of the series would be presented with a computer (usually a BBC Master) for their school. Celebrity episodes of the show were also aired, featuring cast members from Grange Hill and EastEnders.

First Class was notable for its use of video games; such footage (of arcade games in particular) was a rarely seen on UK television at the time and the show aired several years before GamesMaster. The designated contestant from each team would earn points by beating the other player's score; rounds would be either turn-based and head-to-head depending on the game / event. The games were often referred to by their events as opposed to their titles, for example the "spring and vault" round or the "clay pigeon shooting".

== Arcade games featured ==
- Hyper Sports (skeet shooting and vaulting horse events)
- Paperboy
- 720°

== Transmissions ==
=== Series ===
Series	Start date	End date	Episodes
1	3 October 1984	19 December 1984	12
2	8 January 1986	5 March 1986	15
3	7 January 1987	25 February 1987	15
4	6 February 1988	20 August 1988	24

=== Specials ===
Date	Entitle
6 March 1986	Celebrity Special
26 February 1987	Celebrity Special
21 August 1988	Celebrity Special
