= William C. Creel =

American politician and civil servant

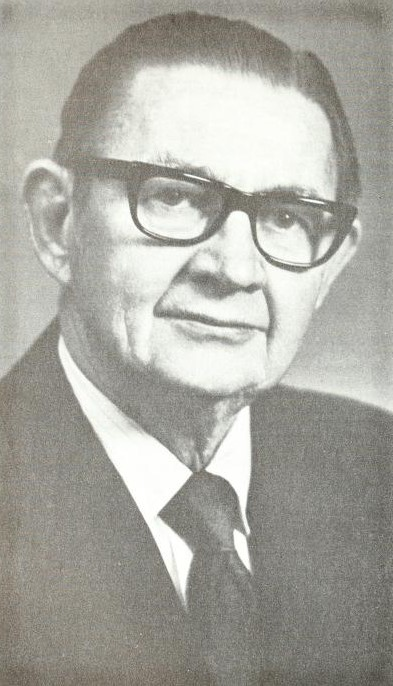

19th Labor Commissioner of North Carolina
- In office 1973 – August 29, 1975
- Preceded by: Frank Crane
- Succeeded by: Thomas Avery Nye, Jr.

Personal details
- Born: 1912 Wake County, North Carolina, United States
- Died: August 29, 1975 (aged 62–63) Raleigh, North Carolina
- Party: Democratic Party
- Education: North Carolina State College

William Charles Creel (1912 – August 29, 1975) was an American politician and civil servant who served as the North Carolina Commissioner of Labor from 1973 to August 29, 1975.

== Early life ==
William Charles Creel was born in 1912 in Wake County, North Carolina, United States to Thomas Braxton Creel and Bessie Puntey Creel. He was educated in Raleigh public schools before attending Cary High School, where he graduated in 1929. In 1936 Creel earned a Bachelor of Science degree in social sciences and a high school education certification from North Carolina State College.

Creel married Eleanor King in 1934 and had four children with her. He served in the United States Navy from 1943 to 1946, being discharged with the rank of lieutenant.

== Career ==
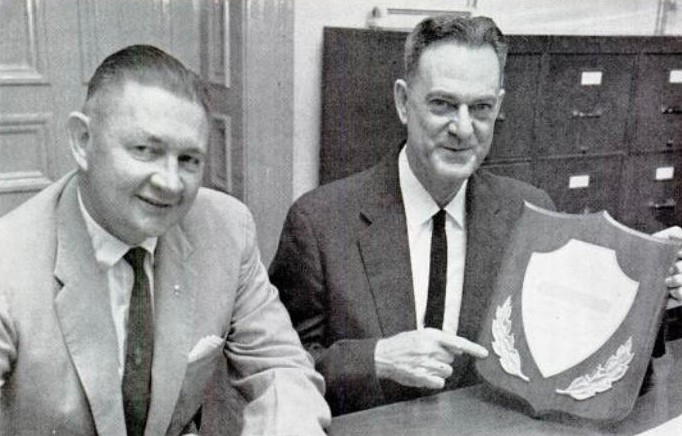
Creel (left) with Frank Crane in 1962

Creel worked for five years as a teacher and coach at Garner High School. In 1942 he was hired by the North Carolina Department of Labor as a safety inspector. Four years later he became the department's safety director. In the late 1950s and early 1960s he oversaw safety training of fertilizer industry personnel in coordination with the National Safety Council. In 1971 Creel became the labor department's safety coordinator. In that capacity he was tasked with developing a plan for the joint federal-state enforcement of the Occupational Safety and Health Act in North Carolina.

Politically, Creel identified strongly as a member of the Democratic Party and stated that he would never "apologize for voting for George McGovern." He served on the executive committee of the North Carolina Democratic Party from 1966 to 1970 and served on the Cary Town Council and a school board. In 1972 the incumbent North Carolina Commissioner of Labor, Frank Crane, announced his decision to retire. Creel subsequently declared his candidacy for the office and ran with the support of Crane and numerous business leaders. Busy with his safety duties in the labor department, he worked on his campaign at night, on weekends, and during periods of leave. He won against five other candidates in the 1972 Democratic primary, defeating John C. Brooks in a run-off. He secured the commissioner's office over Republican nominee Frederick R. Weber in the general election on November 7, 1972. In 1974 the National Safety Council presented him with its "Distinguished Service to Safety Award". In August 1975 he declared his intention to seek reelection.

== Death ==
On August 29, 1975 Creel recorded a Labor Day message for a Raleigh television station in his office. He then placed a phone call to his son and at 1:10 PM he suffered a heart attack. Calling to his office staff for help, he was transported to the emergency room at Rex Hospital. He died at 1:40 PM. North Carolina Governor James Holshouser appointed Thomas Avery Nye, Jr. to succeed him. In September 1975 his widow and surviving family established the W. C. "Billy" Creel Memorial Scholarship at North Carolina State University.

== Works cited ==
- Cheney, John L. Jr., ed. (1975). North Carolina Manual. Raleigh: North Carolina Secretary of State. OCLC 436873840.

Party political offices
Preceded by Frank Crane	Democratic nominee for North Carolina Commissioner of Labor; 1972	Succeeded by John C. Brooks
