= Thomas Avery Nye Jr. =

American politician

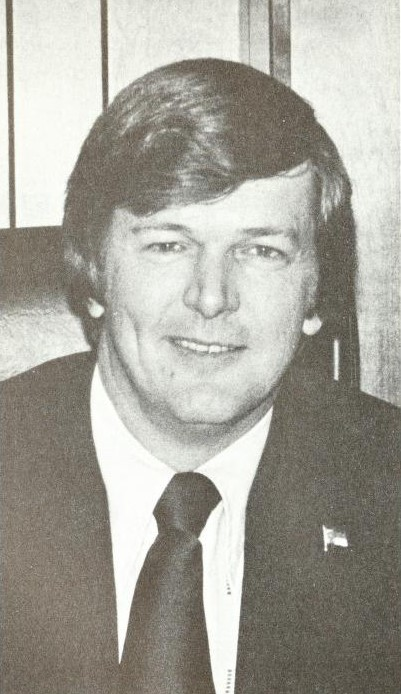

20th Labor Commissioner of North Carolina
- In office September 1975 – January 8, 1977
- Governor: James Holshouser
- Preceded by: William C. Creel
- Succeeded by: John C. Brooks

Personal details
- Born: May 3, 1940 (age 86) Robeson County, North Carolina, United States
- Party: Republican
- Education: North Carolina State University

Thomas Avery Nye Jr. (born May 3, 1940) is an American politician who served as North Carolina Commissioner of Labor from 1975 to 1977. He was the first Republican to hold the office.

== Early life ==
Thomas Avery Nye Jr. was born on May 3, 1940, in Robeson County, North Carolina, United States. He graduated from Orrum High School in 1957 and earned a Bachelor of Science degree from North Carolina State University in 1963. He married Jean Freeman on August 14, 1960 and had two children with her. He was a Baptist and a Freemason.

Nye was the charter president of the Fairmont chapter of the Jaycees from 1965 to 1966. In 1971 he was elected president of the North Carolina chapter of the Jaycees. He held that position until 1972, and the following year he served as a vice president of the national organization.

== Career ==
After graduating from college, Nye took a job with Virginia Electric and Power Company in Petersburg, Virginia. He later worked as a general contractor and was vice president of T. A. Nye & Sons Construction Company.

Nye was initially a member of the Democratic Party, but later registered as a member of the Republican Party after deciding it "was more aligned with my personal beliefs." North Carolina Governor Robert W. Scott, a Democrat, appointed him to the Governors Committee on Constitutional Amendments and for a time he chaired the Fairmont ABC Board. Governor James Holshouser, a Republican, appointed Nye to become North Carolina Commissioner of Labor in September 1975 to fill a vacancy created by the death of the previous incumbent, William C. Creel. Nye was surprised that Holshouser wished to name him to the office but accepted after a few days of consideration. He was the first Republican and businessman to hold the office. The following month he fired six Democrats in the labor department's Occupational Safety and Health Act (OSHA) Division on the grounds that they had been hired solely for political reasons.

Nye supported North Carolina's right-to-work law and advocated for the continuation of North Carolina's state enforcement of OSHA in the place of federal administration. He believed businessmen should actively involve themselves in government. In January 1976 he reorganized the labor department, moving the employment agency regulatory division of the department into the licensing division and appointing three additional business employment officers to the department's advisory council. In October he exempted farms that employed 10 or fewer workers from OSHA inspections and removed most penalties for non-serious OSHA violations at all other businesses.

In May 1976 Nye announced that he would seek election to a full four-year term. He was unopposed in the Republican primary election. In the November 1976 general election Nye faced Democratic nominee John C. Brooks. Nye outspent Brooks in the campaign $173,752 to $70,642, but ultimately lost by over 250,000 votes. He was succeeded by Brooks on January 8, 1977. In 1984 he was appointed executive director of the Howard Corporation. In July 1985 he was appointed vice president of the Admiral Corporation in Palm Coast, Florida.

== Works cited ==
- Cheney, John L. Jr., ed. (1975). North Carolina Manual. Raleigh: North Carolina Secretary of State. OCLC 436873840.

Party political offices
Preceded by Frederick R. Weber	Republican nominee for North Carolina Commissioner of Labor; 1976	Vacant Title next held by Margaret (Freeman) Plemmons
