= Milton Kaye =

20th-century American classical pianist and TV director

Background information
- Born: Milton Jay Katz; June 22, 1909; Brooklyn, New York, U.S.
- Died: August 14, 2006 (aged 97) Manhattan, New York, U.S.
- Education: City College of New York (BA); Institute of Musical Art (MM); New York University (PhD)
- Genres: Classical
- Occupations: Pianist; composer; arranger
- Spouse: Shannon Bolin

Milton Kaye (June 6, 1909 – August 14, 2006) was an American pianist and composer. He played with notable musicians, including Jascha Heifetz and Arturo Toscanini, and was the musical director for major American television shows.

== Early life ==
Kaye was born Milton Jay Katz in Brownsville, Brooklyn in New York City to a Jewish family in 1909. His father, Berish Katz, was a self-taught klezmer musician who played five instruments. Kaye studied Latin at the City College of New York before attending the Institute of Musical Art (now the Juilliard School), where he studied piano under Carl Friedberg.

He attained a doctorate in music at New York University. His thesis analyzed the music of Richard Rodgers, comparing melodies composed for Lorenz Hart and Oscar Hammerstein II.

== Career ==
Kaye began playing in concerts at age 8 and made his debut at Carnegie Hall at age 12. He accompanied the violinist Erika Morini at 17. As a student, he worked as an announcer for WOR before playing piano for the station, eventually moving to WQXR radio.

He performed as a soloist at Carnegie Hall and with major orchestras, including the New York Philharmonic and the Philadelphia Orchestra under Eugene Ormandy. He joined the NBC Symphony of the Air as a pianist under Arturo Toscanini. In 1935, Kaye introduced Shostakovich's Piano Concerto No. 1 to the United States.

In 1944, the United Service Organizations recommended Kaye for an 8-week tour with renowned violinist Jascha Heifetz to entertain American soldiers fighting in World War II. Heifetz's long-time accompanist, Emanuel Bay, declined to join, prompting Heifetz to tour Italy and North Africa with Kaye. The two played in hospitals, opera houses, and the back of military trucks. In 1945, after the war's end, Heifetz invited Kaye to collaborate in California, but he declined a permanent position to continue playing in Toscanini's orchestra. The pair later recorded music for the RCA Records label.

He made his solo debut at The Town Hall in New York City in 1945, with critics at the New York Times praising his "command of light and shade, as well as color" and his "excellent bravura". He played widely across New York concert stages and was also a member of the Virtuosi Piano Quartet.

Kaye was a musical director for each of the major television networks, including NBC, ABC, and CBS. He collaborated with Broadway composers Alec Wilder and Robert Russell Bennett and worked on TV series like Big Top and The Bell Telephone Hour. Kaye composed music for Wheel of Fortune in 1952 and theme music for the TV game show Concentration in 1958. He also wrote music for The Jackie Gleason Show in 1966 and played organ on The Rootie Kazootie Club.

As an advocate of American music, Kaye toured in Europe extensively to play jazz and ragtime as a Goodwill ambassador. The vast majority of his live performances, including those on radio and early television, were not preserved. However, some surviving classical recordings include his collaborations with Heifetz after the war, and with other violinists like Oscar Shumsky, Fritz Kreisler, and Alexander Markov. He recorded a duet with Benjamin Breen in 2005.

He died of pneumonia in Manhattan, aged 97.

== Personal life ==
Kaye married the American actress and singer Shannon Bolin, living together in Manhattan. In 1946, Kaye and Bolin recorded an album, Rare Wine. In 2002, the couple appeared together in a commercial for De Beers diamonds. She died in 2016 at the age of 99.

The couple had two children and five grandchildren.
