= The Rootie Kazootie Club =

- Todd Russell, Rootie Kazootie, Gala Poochie Pup
- Starring: Todd Russell
- Country of origin: United States

Production
- Running time: 15 minutes (weekdays); 30 minutes (Saturdays)

Original release
- Network: WNBT (1950-1951); NBC (1951-1952); ABC (1952-1954)
- Release: October 14, 1950 – May 7, 1954

Rootie Kazootie is the principal character on the 1950-1954 children's television show The Rootie Kazootie Club. The show was the creation of Steve Carlin and featured human actors along with hand puppets.

== Characters ==
Rootie Kazootie was a boy "keen on sports" who played his "magic kazootie" and wore his signature baseball cap with the oversized bill turned up. Puppeteer Paul Ashley controlled his movements, along with those of the "great Mexican catador", called El Squeako Mouse—a takeoff on the idea of a mouse dueling with a cat rather than a bull. Naomi Lewis supplied their voices. Lewis also provided the voice of Rootie's girlfriend Polka Dottie. Frank Milano provided both the actions and voices for their spotted canine companion Gala Poochie Pup and for arch-villain Poison Zoomack, who constantly tried to steal Polka Dottie's polka dots and Rootie's magic kazootie.

Life-sized human characters included host and "chief rooter" Todd ("Big Todd") Russell and the nonspeaking policeman Mr. Deetle Dootle, initially played in 1950 by John Schoeopperle and thereafter by John Vee.

The show was performed live in front of a studio audience of schoolchildren who also were active participants. They joined in singing the theme song, proclaiming at the beginning of each show, "Who is the boy who is full of zip and joy? He's Rootie Kazootie!" A regular feature was the "Quiz-a-Rootie", in which audience members received prizes for themselves and home viewers for answering simple questions.

== History ==
The show first aired locally as The Rootie Tootie Club on the New York NBC affiliate WNBT on October 14, 1950. Since the title character regularly used a magical kazoo, which he called his "Magic Kazootie," the kids began calling him "Rootie Kazootie." Following the kids' lead, the names of the show and the character quickly were changed with the December 26 show. NBC began broadcasting the show nationally on July 2, 1951.

The dog originally was named "Little Nipper" and resembled the mascot of the show's sponsor, RCA Victor, which used a dog referred to as Nipper, but it was rechristened when RCA Victor dropped its sponsorship. Other major sponsors included Coca-Cola and the Walter H. Johnson Candy Company, makers of Powerhouse candy bars.

The show aired on NBC until November 1952 and was seen on ABC beginning in December. The last telecast was seen on May 7, 1954. In January 1995, Ira Gallen resurrected the puppet characters for The New Rootie Kazootie TV Show, a series broadcast on Manhattan's Time-Warner cable outlet.

== Production ==
About 50 people were required to create each 15- or 30-minute show. Credits in addition to those mentioned above include:

- Puppeteers: Paul Ashley, Cosmo Allegretti, Michael King
- Music Director: Gene Perazzo
- Education Director: Dr. Herman Mantell
- Production Manager: Joseph L. Stuhl
- Supervisor: Arnold Cohan
- Director: Dwight A. Hemion, Dave Davidow
- Producer: Steve Carlin
- Organist: Milton Kaye

== Influence in popular culture ==
At the height of the show's popularity, its audience was estimated at between 2 million and 3 million people, and in 1953 fan letters were pouring in at a reported average rate of 32,000 each week. Words such as "yesirootie" and "gosharootie" from the Rootie Kazootie lexicon were adopted by schoolchildren of the time.

The show spawned several children's books as well as a Dell comic book series. Numerous items of related merchandise, including toys, games, and hand puppets, were produced, many of which are available today as sought-after collectibles. Author Lawrence Naumoff appropriated the name "Rootie Kazootie" for the title of a 1990 novel, though it has no explicit connection to the character.

== Episode status ==
The Paley Center for Media holds approximately 50 episodes. While some do not have a date listed, the ones that do are mostly from 1953, with a few from 1952 and 1954.

A half-hour ABC episode from May 29 or 30, 1953, involving the character Poison Zoomack using a "very powerful magnet" has been released in several public-domain compilations and can be viewed at the Internet Archive.
