= Harry Payne (politician) =

American politician

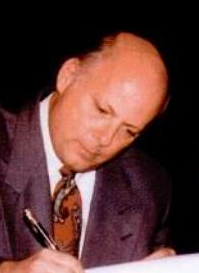
- Harry Payne in 1997

North Carolina Commissioner of Labor
- In office January 1993 – January 2001
- Preceded by: John C. Brooks
- Succeeded by: Cherie Berry

Personal details
- Born: September 11, 1952 (age 74)
- Party: Democratic
- Spouse: Ruth Sheehan
- Children: 3
- Education: University of North Carolina at Chapel Hill; Wake Forest University School of Law

Harry E. Payne Jr. (born September 11, 1952) is an American politician from North Carolina. He served in the North Carolina House of Representatives for six terms and as North Carolina Commissioner of Labor for two terms. He is a member of the Democratic Party.

== Early life and career ==
Payne is from Wilmington, North Carolina. He has a twin brother, Frank. Payne overcame a stutter after attending the Hollins Communications Research Institute in Roanoke, Virginia.

Payne graduated from the University of North Carolina at Chapel Hill in 1974. He earned his Juris Doctor from Wake Forest University School of Law in 1977 and opened a law practice in Wrightsville Beach.

== Political career ==
Payne was elected to the North Carolina House of Representatives in 1980. At the beginning of the 1989 legislative session he joined with 19 other Democrats and the Republican members of the House to unseat Speaker Liston B. Ramsey and replace him with Josephus L. Mavretic. He chaired the House Rules Committee in 1990. He served six terms in the House.

In 1992, Payne ran for North Carolina Commissioner of Labor, challenging John C. Brooks, the incumbent, in the Democratic Party. Brooks' reputation had suffered due to a deadly fire at a chicken processing plant the previous year. Payne accused him of being ineffective and promised to push for workplace safety reforms. Payne won the primary election on May 5. He defeated Republican Nelson Dollar in the November general election. Payne was reelected in the 1996 elections against R. Tracy Walker. He opted not to run for a third term in the 2000 elections. He was succeeded by Cherie Berry.

Governor Mike Easley appointed Payne as chair of the North Carolina Employment Security Commission in 2001. In 2007, Payne sought to become president of Cape Fear Community College. In 2010, he ran for the North Carolina Court of Appeals. Cressie Thigpen and Douglas McCullough advanced to a runoff election.

== Personal life ==
Payne is married to Ruth Sheehan, a columnist for The News & Observer. They have three sons.

== Works cited ==
- Simon, Bryant (2020). The Hamlet Fire: A Tragic Story of Cheap Food, Cheap Government, and Cheap Lives. Chapel Hill: The University of North Carolina Press. ISBN 9781469661377.

Party political offices
Preceded by John C. Brooks	Democratic nominee for North Carolina Commissioner of Labor; 1992, 1996	Succeeded by Doug Berger
