= Catchword (game show) =

- Genre: Game show
- Created by: Bryan Mitchell
- Presented by: Gyles Brandreth (BBC1 Scotland); Paul Coia (BBC2)
- Theme music composer: "Orient Express" by Jean-Michel Jarre (1985–90)
- Country of origin: United Kingdom
- Original language: English
- No. of series: 2 (BBC1 Scotland); 8 (BBC2)
- No. of episodes: 13 (BBC1 Scotland); 430 (BBC2)

Production
- Running time: 30 minutes
- Production company: Leslie Mitchell Associates

Original release
- Network: BBC1 Scotland
- Release: 17 May 1985 – 2 April 1986
- Network: BBC2
- Release: 5 January 1988 – 23 May 1995

Catchword is a daytime word game show first shown on BBC1 Scotland from 17 May 1985 until 2 April 1986, hosted by Gyles Brandreth, and then network on its sister channel BBC2 from 5 January 1988 until 23 May 1995, hosted by Paul Coia.

A computer referred to as Bryan was used to generate words and check the validity of contestants' responses.

== Format ==
In the odd-numbered rounds, contestants scored one point per valid word, and a three-point bonus was awarded for the longest word. If two or more contestants tied for the longest word, each of them received the bonus. Words had to appear in the Chambers Dictionary in order to be valid; proper nouns and hyphenated words were not allowed.

The even-numbered rounds were played on the buzzer, with one point for each correct answer. If no one buzzed-in for a certain length of time, Coia would give a clue to the answer.

=== Round 1 – Four Second Word Game ===
Each contestant in turn was shown 10 different sets of three consonants, one every four seconds. For each set, the contestant had to give a word that started with the first consonant and included the other two in the specified order (e.g. "calamity" for C-L-M).

=== Round 2 – Hall of Fame ===
Ten anagrams or sets of scrambled letters were generated, one at a time, and the contestants buzzed-in and tried to rearrange each set into a name that fit a specified category.

=== Round 3 – Flying Solo ===
One at a time, each contestant was given a set of three consonants and had 30 seconds to think of as many words as possible that started with the first and included the other two in order. Each valid word awarded one point; however, if the contestant gave multiple words that were deemed to have the same root (e.g. "profit" and "profiteer"), only the longest word was counted.

During the first three series, a set of three letters would appear. From series 4 on, the centre consonant was replaced by a joker and the contestant had to decide which consonant it would represent before starting to form any words.

=== Round 4 – They Said It / Hidden Word in a Sentence ===
Eight poems were generated, one at a time. Each poem had one incomplete word, which the contestants had to finish.

From series 5 onward, this round was replaced by "Hidden Word in a Sentence". The contestants were shown a sentence in which a word had been hidden, typically comprising the end of one word and the start of the next, and which was phrased to include a clue to that word. (E.g. "Pill used by table tennis player" would lead to "tablet".) The contestants had to buzz-in and state the hidden word. Seven sentences were played.

=== Round 5 – Through the Vowel ===
Three 3-by-3 grids of nine letters were played, each with a vowel in the centre surrounded by consonants. Each contestant in turn read off a line of three letters that included the vowel, then gave a word that started with the first consonant and included the other two letters in order. The two consonants in the line were removed from the grid before the next contestant's turn, and a new grid was played after all three had given a word. A different contestant played first on each grid.

A line of letters could be played reading in either direction, such as "Y-A-T" becoming "yachtswomen" or "T-A-Y" becoming "treasury".

=== Round 6 – Synonym Game ===
The contestants were shown one pair of words at a time; within each pair, one word had been scrambled and was a synonym for the other. The contestants had to buzz-in and give the unscrambled word.

=== Final Round ===
The Four Second Word Game was played again, under the same rules as Round 1.

At the end of this round, the high scorer became the day's champion and was invited to return for the next show. Any contestant who won five matches in a row retired undefeated.

=== Prizes ===
The winner of each match received a reference book of their choice (dictionary, thesaurus, etc.) as their prize. Undefeated champions won a larger prize, such as a home computer package or a learning vacation.

== Transmissions ==
=== BBC1 Scotland ===
Series	Start date	End date	Episodes	Recorded
1	17 May 1985	28 June 1985	7	1985
2	24 February 1986	2 April 1986	6	1986

=== BBC2 ===
Series	Start date	End date	Episodes	Recorded
1	5 January 1988	11 March 1988	40	1987
2	14 November 1988	17 February 1989	50	1988
3	6 November 1989	2 February 1990	50	1989
4	19 November 1990	26 March 1991	50	1990
5	11 November 1991	18 March 1992	60	1991
6	26 October 1992	18 February 1993	60	1992
7	1 November 1993	10 March 1994	60	1993
8	24 October 1994	23 May 1995	60	1994
