= Paul Coia =

Scottish television presenter (born 1955)

Paul Coia (born 19 June 1955 in Glasgow) is a Scottish television presenter and continuity announcer. His career originally began in the late 1970s as a DJ and in the early 1980s he became an announcer. He has presented many television shows including Pebble Mill at One and Catchword. He is currently covering shows for BBC Radio Berkshire and London's Radio Jackie, and coaches executives around the world in Communications. In November 2023 The Guardian named him as one of ten people who changed UK TV forever, as his was the first voice heard on Channel 4 when it launched in 1982.

== Early life and career ==
Paul Coia and his twin Gerard were born in 1955, and he had two younger siblings, Martin and Denise. Coia was educated at Merrylee Convent, John Ogilvie Hall and St Aloysius' College and then at the University of Glasgow and Paisley College of Technology (now University of the West of Scotland) to do a BSc degree course. His ambition was to become a dentist but it remained unrealised as his exam results were not to the level required.

Coia instead moved into broadcasting where he started off as a hospital radio presenter in December 1976 and later gained a job as a disc jockey at Radio Clyde in June 1977. He started off presenting the weekend overnight slots, Friday into Saturday Morning, Saturday into Sunday Morning and Sunday into Monday Morning, followed by spells presenting weekend shows, such as the Saturday morning show Children's Choice. Coia returned to Radio Clyde as a relief cover presenter throughout the 1980s, 1990s and the 2000s.

In 1979, Coia made his TV debut with a guest appearance on the long-running No. 1 kids programme in Scotland Glen Michael's Cartoon Cavalcade then became a continuity announcer and newsreader for Scottish Television. After dropping his script and continuing by ad libbing, Coia was given his own summer series Hi Summer in 1980 followed his own chat show, Meet Paul Coia in 1981.

In 1982 he joined Channel 4 on its launch and was the first voice heard on air. Unusually for continuity of the time, Coia could also occasionally be seen in-vision, usually before closedown. Subsequently, he became a presenter of BBC1's daytime magazine programme, Pebble Mill at One. and BBC 2's 6:55 where he replaced Starsky and Hutch actor David Soul. In 1983 he became a long-running presenter on BBC Schools programme Zig Zag.

During 1987, Coia made his second chat show, this time for Grampian Television The Paul Coia Show which was broadcast also on Scottish Television, and he also made his first gameshow, Split Second.

In 1988 Coia became the host of the BBC gameshow Catchword.

He stood in once with his wife Debbie Greenwood, a former Miss Great Britain winner, for Gloria Hunniford's afternoon chat show on Five. They presented the weekend breakfast show on LBC together for a year, and also sat in for Derek and Ellen Jameson on the late-night show on BBC Radio 2. Coia (broadcasting solo) also deputised for Ken Bruce, Ed Stewart and other presenters on that station, and hosted the station's summer roadshows while also presenting on BBC One's The Holiday Show. Coia also sat in for Jimmy Mack on Clyde 2's drivetime show for a couple of weeks in September 1992. Coia also did cover work as a part-time presenter on BBC Radio Scotland throughout the 2000s.

In 2002, Coia created a quiz show for the BBC, The Enemy Within.

In 2005, Coia returned to Radio Clyde where he presented on the weekday lunchtime show from 12 – 3pm on Clyde 2, He covered for veteran presenter Bill Smith over the Easter period A year later, Coia presented on Saturday afternoons from 2–6pm, covering for Super Scoreboard whilst the football season was off for the summer time.

Coia was a continuity announcer and trail voiceover (all pre-recorded) for the now-defunct digital channel ABC1. He was also heard on 102.2 Smooth Radio from February 2008. Coia took over the Drivetime show from December 2008 until the end of 2010 after Martin Collins left the station. In April 2013 he became a Sunday morning presenter for BBC Radio Berkshire, discussing religious issues of the day and locality.

In 2017, he started to present BBC Radio London cover shows.

On 2 November 2022, forty years to the day after he introduced the first programme to be broadcast on Channel 4, Coia once again provided the continuity announcement for that day's edition of Countdown.

Coia also works as a Presentation and Media coach and corporate speaker, hosting events and coaching executives in many countries. He occasionally presents on Radio Jackie.

Coia won the Radio Industry Club's Scottish Radio Presenter of the Year award, other awards include Radio Personality of the Year, the Golden Rose of Montreaux (Rose D’Or) TV Awards, runner up in the BBC's Gillards and a Webby award for corporate communication.

== Personal life ==
Coia lives in Kingston-upon-Thames, London with his wife, former Miss Great Britain and QVC presenter Debbie Greenwood. They have two daughters. He has a twin brother Gerard, and a sister and brother, Denise and Martin, who are also twins.

== TV shows ==
- Glen Michael's Cartoon Cavalcade (1979 Scottish TV)
- Hi Summer (1980 Scottish TV)
- Meet Paul Coia (1981 Scottish TV)
- Pebble Mill at One (1983–1986)
- Six Fifty-five (1983)
- Zig Zag (BBC Schools programme) 1984–1990
- Domesday Detectives (1986)
- The Paul Coia Show (Grampian TV, 1986–1988)
- Split Second (1988)
- Catchword (1988–1995)
- Telethon 1988, 1990 and 1992 – host for Scotland
- BBC Railwatch (1989) – correspondent
- Rab C Nesbitt: "Holiday" (1990)
- Garden Party (1990–1991, BBC)
- Press Your Luck (1991–1992 HTV)
- Children in Need (1991–1992) – host for Scotland
- Spellbound (1994–1996, Sky One)
- Don't Drink the Water (1997)
- Heaven Knows (1997–98)
- Pull the Other One (1998)
- Flash in the Pan (1999)
