= Shannon Bolin =

American actress and singer (1917–2016)

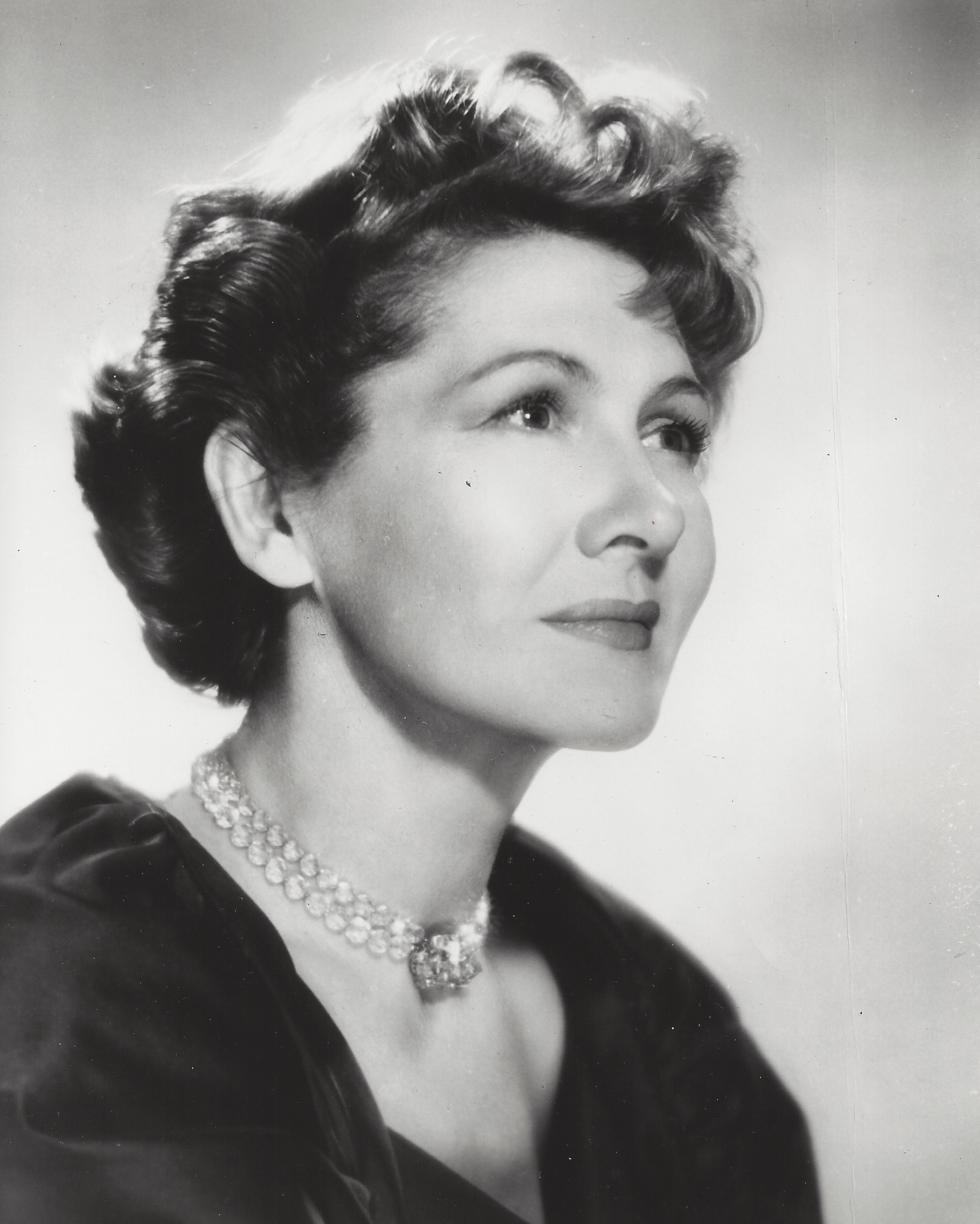
- Born: January 1, 1917; Spencer, South Dakota, U.S.
- Died: March 25, 2016 (aged 99); New York, U.S.
- Other names: Anne Bolin; Ione Shannon Bolin
- Occupations: Actress, singer
- Years active: 1943–2016
- Spouse: Milton Kaye (1946–2006; his death)

Shannon Bolin (January 1, 1917 – March 25, 2016) was an American actress and singer. A March 10, 1941, article in The Mason City Globe-Gazette said that she was "known as 'The Lady with the Dark Blue Voice'".

== Early years ==
Ione Shannon Bolin was born in Spencer, South Dakota, on Jan. 1, 1917. Her parents were Gracie Elsie Bolin and Harry Bolin, a hotel owner who raised horses during the Depression. In an interview she said her father named her Ione "because I was born on the first of January, which is 1-1, or 1-one. That's South Dakota humor for you.” Notable teenage vocal performances included those before a statewide meeting of the South Dakota Educators Association in November 1938.

At age 20, she headed to the East Coast to pursue a career as a singer. In Washington, D.C., Bolin worked for CBS Radio and during World War II she became the host of her own musical program. In March 1944 she appeared at New York's Stage Door Canteen. The following month she performed at the Brooklyn Museum on an all-Russian program with the Chamber Music Guild of Washington, with which she had been associated while living there. In 1944 she also auditioned for the New York's New Opera Company and won a place in the ensemble. By 1945 she had been heard over New York's WHN radio station.

== Stage ==
As a member of the NBC Opera Theater roster, she appeared on a nationwide telecast of Puccini's Suor Angelica on 5 December 1954 in the contralto role of The Princess. Bolin then portrayed Meg Boyd in both the 1955-57 original Broadway production and the 1958 film version of Damn Yankees.

Her other stage roles include The Golden Apple (as Mrs. Juniper), Only in America (as Kate Golden), The Student Gypsy (as Zampa Allescu) Take Me Along (as Lily), Xmas in Las Vegas (as Eleanor Wellspot), and Helen Goes to Troy, for which she used the pseudonym Anne Bolin.

Bolin worked with Marc Blitzstein on Regina the opera based on The Little Foxes. She played the alternate lead when the work debuted on Broadway.

== Film ==
In addition to the film version of Damn Yankees, Bolin's other film appearances include If Ever I See You Again (1978) and the low-budget horror film The Children (1980).

== Radio ==
Bolin did radio work in New York City for the Theatre Guild of the Air production of Allegro. She sang Brahms lieder on WQXR for the Stromberg-Carlson series.

In the early 1940s, she was a regular singer on the CBS program Your Town and Ours.

== Television ==
Bolin appeared on television in the NBC Opera Theatre production of Suor Angelica, in which she played the Princess, and the Jackie Gleason Show, a special titled "The Christmas List" as Gleason's wife.

== Recording ==
In 1955, Bolin recorded "an album of seldom-heard songs by top composers" for Vanguard Records. She and her husband "dug through thousands of 'long-lost' tunes by top songwriters and came up with 12 which they call Rare Wine". The composers and lyricists were Vernon Duke, Alec Wilder, Noël Coward, Ira and George Gershwin, Richard Rodgers, Larry Hart, Oscar Hammerstein, Jerome Kern, Ogden Nash, Frank Loesser, Johann Strauss, Edward Eager, Bart Howard, and John LaTouche.

== Personal life and death ==
Bolin married Milton Kaye (1909–2006), a New York pianist, composer and arranger, in 1946. Kaye and Bolin recorded an album, Rare Wine. In 2002, the couple appeared together in a commercial for DeBeers diamonds. She died at the age of 99 on March 25, 2016.
