= Cherie Berry =

American politician from North Carolina

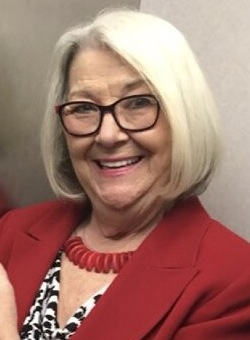

17th Labor Commissioner of North Carolina
- In office January 6, 2001 – January 2, 2021
- Governor: Mike Easley; Bev Perdue; Pat McCrory; Roy Cooper
- Preceded by: Harry Payne
- Succeeded by: Josh Dobson

Member of the North Carolina House of Representatives from the 45th district
- In office January 1, 1993 – January 1, 2001 Serving with Charles Preston, Joe Kiser
- Preceded by: Doris Rogers Huffman; Walter Stine Isenhower
- Succeeded by: Mark Hilton

Personal details
- Born: December 21, 1946 (age 79) Newton, North Carolina, U.S.
- Party: Republican
- Education: Lenoir-Rhyne University; Gaston College; Oakland Community College

Nora Cherie Killian Berry (born December 21, 1946) is an American politician who served as the North Carolina Commissioner of Labor from 2001 to 2021. A member of the Republican Party, she was the first woman to hold the office.

== Early life ==
Nora Cherie Killian was born in Newton, North Carolina, on December 21, 1946, to Earl and Lena Carrigan Killian. Her father gave her the name Cherie after the French phrase "ma chérie" (English: my darling) which he had heard in France on his way home following his release as a prisoner-of-war of World War II. Killian graduated from Maiden High School in Maiden, North Carolina, in 1965 and then moved to Boone, North Carolina, where she worked wrapping Christmas presents at a department store and selling advertisements for, writing for, and delivering newspapers. She attended Lenoir Rhyne College, ending her studies there in 1967. She also studied at Gaston College in 1969 and Oakland Community College in 1977. She married Norman H. Berry Jr. and took his last name.

In 1985 Berry and her husband founded LGM Ltd., a company based in a former billiard hall that manufactured spark-plug wires for cars. After initial financial uncertainty, the venture became very profitable. Norman H. Berry Jr. died in 2006.

== Political career ==
=== State House ===
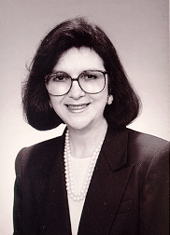
Berry as a State Representative

Berry served in the North Carolina House of Representatives from 1993 to 2000, where she chaired the welfare reform committee and co-chaired the commerce committee.

=== State Labor Commissioner ===
In November 2000, she was elected state labor commissioner, the first woman to hold the post and the first Republican elected to the post. Berry was sworn in as North Carolina Commissioner of Labor on January 6, 2001. She was the only Republican on the Council of State between 2001 and 2005, and defeated Democrat Wayne Goodwin to win a second term in the 2004 statewide elections. Berry narrowly defeated Mary Fant Donnan to keep her seat in the 2008 election. Berry won a fourth four-year term in November 2012, defeating former Labor Commissioner John C. Brooks by more than 280,000 votes. Berry won a fifth four-year term in November 2016, defeating former Raleigh mayor Charles Meeker by more than 476,000 votes, her largest percentage margin of victory. On April 2, 2019, she announced at a Council of State meeting that she would not seek reelection. She endorsed Pearl Burris Floyd to succeed her.

Berry was criticized in a newspaper report on poultry plant oversight. In 2008, The Charlotte Observer found that at least half of contributors to Berry's reelection campaign were the executives and managers of business inspected by the department she leads. The same report also found that while Berry's department reduced fines for workplace safety violations as a matter of routine, "Berry's contributors have usually gotten bigger-than-average breaks."

== In popular culture ==
During Berry's first term as North Carolina Commissioner of Labor, her spokesman suggested that she include a portrait of herself on inspection forms displayed in elevators in the state "to put a face on government". Berry initially rejected the idea, but decided to implement it after winning reelection.

Berry has received a small following among younger North Carolinians due to her catchy name and her picture inside elevators in North Carolina. Her picture and signature appeared inside all elevators in North Carolina on the Certification of Operation leading to her receiving the unofficial title of "The Elevator Queen." A paper published in a political science journal attributes her success above that of other Republican politicians to the presence of her name and picture in elevators across the state. In 2018 Elon University conducted a poll on photographic recognition of North Carolina politicians. Most of the respondents who correctly identified Berry referred to her as the "Elevator Lady" or the "Elevator Queen" instead of using her name.

In 2007 musician Dan Bryk recorded a song, Cherry Berry, about the "gal in the elevator" after seeing Berry's photograph in an elevator. He released it under a pseudonym, Tha Commissioners, on a MySpace page and supplied a copy to a disc jockey at WKNC-FM, North Carolina State University's student radio station. The music director at the station played it frequently, and Berry said of it, "I just think it rocks." The band Alternative Champs also released a song about her, entitled, Cherie Berry. A Raleigh shirt company released a shirt with the words "Cherie Berry lifts me up" printed on the front. A Durham restaurant also listed a "Cherie Berry's Elevated Tea" on its menu. In 2019 two North Carolina breweries released cherry-flavored beers in homage to Berry.

== Later life ==
Following her departure from the labor commissionership, Berry moved to Toledo, Ohio.

== Electoral history ==
North Carolina House of Representatives 45th District Election, 1996
Party	Candidate	Votes	%
Republican	Joe Kiser (inc.)	29,173	50.64
Republican	Cherie Killian Berry (inc.)	28,436	49.36

North Carolina House of Representatives 45th District Election, 1998
Party	Candidate	Votes	%
Republican	Joe Kiser (inc.)	20,275	39.02
Republican	Cherie Killian Berry (inc.)	20,122	38.72
Democratic	Columbus Turner	11,567	22.26

North Carolina Commissioner of Labor Republican Primary Election, 2000
Party	Candidate	Votes	%
Republican	Cherie Killian Berry	92,695	38.39
Republican	John Miller	74,127	30.70
Republican	Mac Wetherman	49,468	20.49
Republican	Carl Southard	25,135	10.41

North Carolina Commissioner of Labor Election, 2000
Party	Candidate	Votes	%
Republican	Cherie Killian Berry	1,379,417	50.13
Democratic	Doug Berger	1,372,165	49.87

North Carolina Commissioner of Labor Republican Primary Election, 2004
Party	Candidate	Votes	%
Republican	Cherie Berry (inc.)	194,723	64.57
Republican	Lloyd Funderburk	106,841	35.43

North Carolina Commissioner of Labor Election, 2004
Party	Candidate	Votes	%
Republican	Cherie Berry (inc.)	1,723,004	52.09
Democratic	Wayne Goodwin	1,584,488	47.91

North Carolina Commissioner of Labor Election, 2008
Party	Candidate	Votes	%
Republican	Cherie Berry (inc.)	2,065,095	50.61
Democratic	Mary Fant Donnan	2,015,442	49.39

North Carolina Commissioner of Labor Election, 2012
Party	Candidate	Votes	%
Republican	Cherie Berry (inc.)	2,300,500	53.26
Democratic	John C. Brooks	2,019,266	46.74

North Carolina Commissioner of Labor Election, 2016
Party	Candidate	Votes	%
Republican	Cherie Berry (inc.)	2,487,829	55.21
Democratic	Charles Meeker	2,013,300	44.68
none	Write-ins (total)	5,006	0.11

== Citations ==
Party political offices
Preceded by R. Tracy Walker	Republican nominee for North Carolina Commissioner of Labor; 2000, 2004, 2008, 2012, 2016	Succeeded by Josh Dobson
North Carolina House of Representatives
Preceded by Doris Rogers Huffman; Walter Stine Isenhower	Member of the North Carolina House of Representatives from the 45th district 1993–2001; Served alongside: Charles Preston, Joe Kiser	Succeeded by Mark Hilton
Political offices
Preceded by Harry Payne	Labor Commissioner of North Carolina; 2001-2021	Succeeded by Josh Dobson
