= Lawrence Naumoff =

American novelist

- Born: July 23, 1946 (age 80); Charlotte, North Carolina, U.S.
- Education: University of North Carolina at Chapel Hill
- Occupation: Writer
- Writing career
- Pen name: Peter Nesovich
- Notable awards: Whiting Award (1990)
- Website: www.lawrencenaumoff.com

Lawrence Naumoff (born July 23, 1946) is an American fiction writer who currently lives in Carrboro, North Carolina. He was born in Charlotte, North Carolina and was educated at the University of North Carolina, where he currently teaches in the Creative Writing Program.

Early in his career he published several stories under the pseudonym Peter Nesovich.

His novel, Taller Women, a Cautionary Tale, was a New York Times Notable Book of the Year in 1992. His most recent book, A Southern Tragedy, in Crimson and Yellow, although a novel and set over a number of years, is partially based on the true story of the 1991 Hamlet chicken processing plant fire. The book was awarded the 2005 Walter Raleigh Award for the best work of fiction by a North Carolina author.

Other prizes garnered by Naumoff include a Whiting Award, a Thomas Wolfe Memorial Award, a National Endowment for the Arts Discovery Award, and the Carolina Quarterly Fiction Award.

== Bibliography ==
- The Night of the Weeping Women (1988)
- Rootie Kazootie (1990)
- Taller Women, a Cautionary Tale (1992) - New York Times Notable Book of the Year, 1992
- Silk Hope, NC (1994)
- A Plan for Women (1997)
- A Southern Tragedy, in Crimson and Yellow (2005)
- The Longest Mobile Home in the Blue Ridge Mountains (2010) (ebook)
- The Cashmere Sweater and Other Stories (2011) (ebook)
- The Beautiful Couple and Other Stories (2011) (ebook)

== Sources ==
- Flora, Vogel, and Bryan, Southern Writers: A New Biographical Dictionary, LSU Press 2006. ISBN 0-8071-3123-7
