= North Carolina Commissioner of Labor =

Elected constitutional officer in a U.S. state

Commissioner of Labor of North Carolina
- Incumbent; Luke Farley since January 2, 2025
- Member of: Council of State
- Seat: Raleigh, North Carolina
- Term length: Four years, no term limit
- Formation: 1887
- Succession: Ninth
- Salary: $168,384
- Website: www.labor.nc.gov

The commissioner of labor is a statewide elected office in the U.S. state of North Carolina. The commissioner is a constitutional officer who leads the state's Department of Labor. North Carolina's general statues provide the commissioner with wide-ranging regulatory and enforcement powers to tend to the welfare of the state's workforce. They also sit on the North Carolina Council of State. The incumbent is Luke Farley, who assumed office in January 2025.

The original Bureau of Labor Statistics, the historical precursor of the present Department of Labor, was created by the North Carolina General Assembly in 1887, with provision for appointment by the governor of a commissioner of labor statistics for a two-year term. In 1899 another act was passed providing that the commissioner, beginning with the general election of 1900, be elected by the people for a four-year term. The office was elevated to constitutional status in 1944.

== History of the office ==
Following lobbying by the Knights of Labor for a state labor bureau, the Bureau of Labor Statistics was established by the North Carolina General Assembly in 1887 as a sub-agency of the Department of Agriculture, Immigration, and Statistics. The bureau was led by a commissioner, who was to be appointed by the Governor of North Carolina with the consent of the North Carolina Senate. With the aid of a chief clerk and other appointed assistants, the commissioner of labor statistics gathered information on workers' hours, wages, education, and finances. They were also tasked with promoting the "mental, material, social, and moral prosperity" of the workforce. Their findings were compiled into an annual report to be submitted to the General Assembly and the press. The first appointed commissioner was Wesley N. Jones. In 1899 the General Assembly transformed the Bureau of Labor Statistics into an independent agency responsible for both statistic collection and printing of state documents, the Bureau of Labor and Printing. At the same time, they made the commissioner a popularly-elected official with four-year terms, beginning with the elections of 1900 with an interim commissioner to be appointed by the legislators. Henry B. Varner was the first popularly-elected commissioner. An assistant commissioner's position was also created to be filled by a person with printing experience.

Early on, the commissioner's bureau had minimal staffing and responsibilities. In 1919 the bureau was elevated to department status, and in 1931 the General Assembly reorganized it and shortened its name to Department of Labor, opening it up to more regulatory and enforcement responsibilities. The commissionership was made a constitutional office in 1944. A 1968 constitutional study commission recommended making the governor responsible for the selection of the commissioner to reduce voters' burden by shortening the ballot, but this proposal was disregarded by the General Assembly when it revised the state constitution in 1971.

Historically, the office has not usually been politically powerful or prominent in the state. Cherie Berry, who assumed the commissionership in 2001, was the first woman elected to the office. In 2005, Berry began placing her photo on labor department inspection certification forms in elevators in North Carolina. The move garnered increased public attention to herself and the commissioner's office, and earned her the moniker "elevator queen". Berry holds the record for longest tenure as labor commissioner. Her successor, Josh Dobson discontinued the practice of putting the commissioner's photo on elevator inspection certifications in 2023. The incumbent commissioner is Luke Farley, who assumed office on January 2, 2025.

== Powers, duties, and structure ==
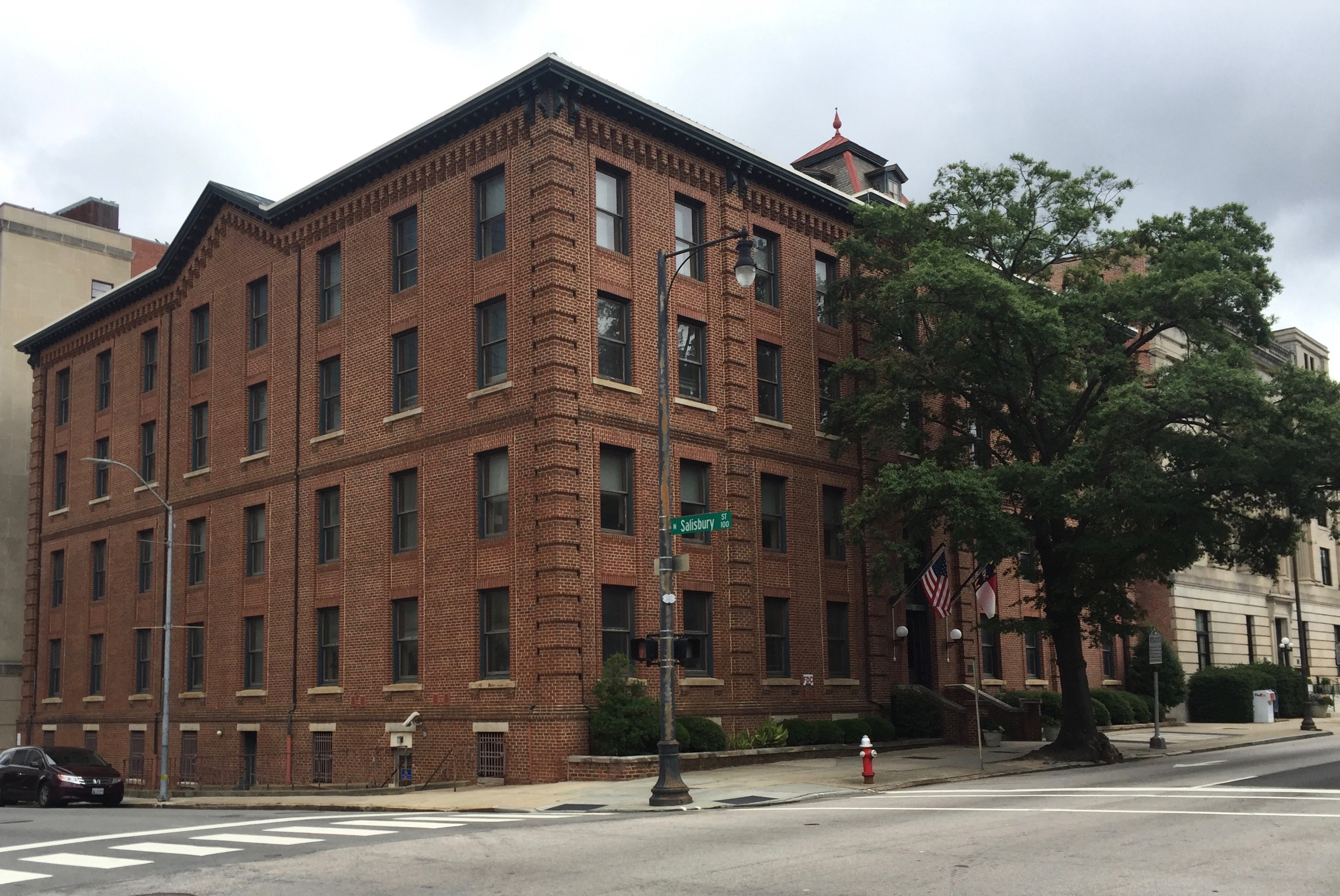
The Labor Building in Raleigh, which houses the commissioner's office

Article III, Section 7, of the Constitution of North Carolina stipulates the popular election of the commissioner of labor every four years. The office holder is not subject to term limits. In the event of a vacancy in the office, the Governor of North Carolina has the authority to appoint a successor until a candidate is elected at the next general election for members of the General Assembly. Per Article III, Section 8 of the constitution, the commissioner sits on the Council of State. They are ninth in line of succession to the governor.

The North Carolina Department of Labor is by law tasked with ensuring the "health, safety, and general well-being" of the state's workforce. North Carolina's general statutes grant the commissioner of labor wide-ranging regulatory and enforcement powers. The commissioner leads the Department of Labor and its constituent bureaus. As of February 2023, the department has 318 employees retained under the terms of the State Human Resources Act. The commissioner is advised by five statutory boards in creating policies and developing programs. As with all Council of State officers, the commissioner's salary is fixed by the General Assembly and cannot be reduced during their term of office. As of 2025, the commissioner's annual salary is $168,384. The commissioner's office is located in the Labor Building, formerly the meeting place of the North Carolina Supreme Court, on West Edenton Street in Raleigh, North Carolina.

== List of commissioners of labor ==
=== Appointed commissioners ===
Commissioners of labor
No.	Commissioner	Term in office	Source
1	Wesley N. Jones	1887 – 1889	
2	John C. Scarborough	1889 – 1892	
3	William I. Harris	1892 – 1893	
4	Benjamin R. Lacy	1893 – 1897	
5	James Y. Hamrick	1897 – 1899	
6	Benjamin R. Lacy	1899 – 1901	

=== Elected commissioners ===
Commissioners of labor
No.	Commissioner	Term in office	Party	Source
1	Henry B. Varner	1901 – 1909	Democratic	
2	Mitchell L. Shipman	1909 – 1925	Democratic	
3	Franklin D. Grist	1925 – 1933	Democratic	
4	Arthur L. Fletcher	1933 – 1938	Democratic	
5	Forrest H. Shuford	1938 – 1954	Democratic	
6	Frank Crane	1954 – 1973	Democratic	
7	William C. Creel	1973 – 1975	Democratic	
8	Thomas Avery Nye Jr.	1975 – 1977	Republican	
9	John C. Brooks	1977 – 1993	Democratic	
10	Harry Payne	1993 – 2000	Democratic	
11	Cherie Berry	2001 – 2021	Republican	
12	Josh Dobson	2021 – 2024	Republican	
13	Kevin O'Barr	2024 – 2025		
14	Luke Farley	2025 – present	Republican	

== Works cited ==
- Beckel, Deborah (2011). Radical Reform: Interracial Politics in Post-Emancipation North Carolina. Charlottesville: University of Virginia Press. ISBN 978-0-8139-3002-2.
- Guillory, Ferrel (June 1988). "The Council of State and North Carolina's Long Ballot : A Tradition Hard to Change" (PDF). N.C. Insight. N.C. Center for Public Policy Research. pp. 40–44.
- North Carolina Manual. Raleigh: North Carolina Secretary of State. 2001. OCLC 436873840.
- North Carolina Manual (PDF). Raleigh: North Carolina Department of the Secretary of State. 2011. OCLC 2623953. Archived from the original (PDF) on 2023-08-02.
- Orth, John V.; Newby, Paul M. (2013). The North Carolina State Constitution (second ed.). Oxford University Press. ISBN 9780199300655.
- Simon, Bryant (2020). The Hamlet Fire: A Tragic Story of Cheap Food, Cheap Government, and Cheap Lives. Chapel Hill: The University of North Carolina Press. ISBN 9781469661377.
- Smith, Jacob F. H.; Weinberg, Neil (2016). "The Elevator Effect: Advertising, Priming, and the Rise of Cherie Berry". American Politics Research. 44 (3): 496–522. doi:10.1177/1532673X15602755. S2CID 156042718.
