= John C. Brooks =

American lawyer

21st Labor Commissioner of North Carolina
- In office January 8, 1977 – 1993
- Preceded by: Thomas Avery Nye, Jr.
- Succeeded by: Harry E. Payne Jr.

Personal details
- Born: January 10, 1937 (age 89)
- Party: Democratic Party
- Education: University of North Carolina at Chapel Hill

John Charles Brooks (born January 10, 1937) is an American attorney who served as North Carolina Commissioner of Labor from 1977 to 1993.

== Early life ==
John Brooks was born on January 10, 1937 in Greenville, North Carolina. He graduated from Greenville High School earned a degree in political science at the University of North Carolina at Chapel Hill. He then attended the University of Chicago Law School on scholarship, graduating in 1962. He worked as an attorney and clerked for N.C. Supreme Court Justice William H. Bobbitt. He served on the staff of Governor Terry Sanford, served as the North Carolina General Assembly's first legislative services officer from 1968 to 1970, and assisted constitutional conventions in Maryland and Illinois before being elected Labor Commissioner in 1976.

== Commissioner of Labor ==
=== 1976 campaign ===
In 1976 Brooks sought the Democratic nomination to become North Carolina Commissioner of Labor. One of four candidates in the Democratic primary, he acquired the endorsement of state AFL–CIO president Wilbur Hobby. Brooks finished second in the primary with 33 percent of the vote, behind Jessie Rae Scott, the wife of former governor Robert W. Scott. As Scott had not secured an absolute majority, Brooks called for a run-off primary. Scott, who ran as a conservative, criticized him for being too friendly to the interests of organized labor, but Brooks deflected this by pointing out that Scott's husband and other family members had been elected to public office with the backing of labor unions. He won the second primary with 51 percent of the vote. In the November 1976 general election, Brooks faced Republican incumbent Thomas Avery Nye, Jr. Nye outspent Brooks in the campaign $173,752 to $70,642, but the latter ultimately won by over 250,000 votes.

=== Tenure ===
Brooks was sworn in as Labor Commissioner on January 8, 1977, succeeding Nye. During his tenure, Brooks expanded job training through the apprenticeship program. He implemented annual inspections of all migrant labor camps and chicken processing plants. He adopted a blood-borne pathogens standard and regulations designed to curb abuses in the temporary employment agency industry. He expanded the Wage and Hour enforcement staff so that there could be prompt response to wage and hour complaints. He insisted that all amusement rides be inspected every time they were reassembled. Brooks also advocated for the protection of workers' benefits and for the state minimum wage to be tied to the federal minimum wage.

His tenure included the 1991 fire at a food-processing plant in Hamlet that killed 25 workers. Brooks fined the plant $808,150, which was the largest such penalty in state history. The major cause of death in the accident was the locked exterior doors which was not covered by an OSHA standard at the time, but by a standard administered by the N. C. Department of Insurance. After the 1991 fire, Brooks adopted the North Carolina Building Code as an OSHA standard, which would have allowed the citation of locked exterior doors.

Brooks lost the 1992 Democratic primary for Commissioner of Labor to Harry E. Payne Jr. After Payne won the general election, he rescinded the new standard allowing citation for locked exterior doors.

== 2008 election ==
In 2008, at age 71, Brooks filed as a Democrat to run for Commissioner of Labor again. Brooks placed second in the May 2008 primary, but because no candidate garnered more than 40 percent of the vote, he was allowed to call for a runoff on June 24, with first-place finisher Mary Fant Donnan. On the runoff election day, Brooks lost to Donnan, 68%-32%. Voter turnout was 2%, setting a new record for low turnout in North Carolina.

== 2012 election ==
Brooks ran for Commissioner again in 2012. He won the May 8 Democratic primary but because he failed to garner 40 percent of the vote, he faced a runoff with runner-up Marlowe Foster. In the July 17 runoff, Brooks defeated Foster to win the nomination.

== Works cited ==
- Christensen, Rob (2019). The Rise and Fall of the Branchhead Boys: North Carolina's Scott Family and the Era of Progressive Politics. Chapel Hill: The University of North Carolina Press. ISBN 9781469651057.
- O'Connor, Paul T. (January 1994). "The Evolution of the Speaker's Office". N.C. Insight. North Carolina Center for Public Policy Research. pp. 22–29, 32–41, 43–45.

Party political offices
Preceded by William C. Creel	Democratic nominee for North Carolina Commissioner of Labor; 1976, 1980, 1984, 1988	Succeeded by Harry Payne
Preceded by Mary Fant Donnan	Democratic nominee for North Carolina Commissioner of Labor; 2012	Succeeded by Charles Meeker
Political offices
Preceded by Thomas Avery Nye, Jr.	Labor Commissioner of North Carolina; 1977–1993	Succeeded by Harry E. Payne, Jr.
