= Wesley N. Jones =

American politician (1852–1928)

Wesley Norwood Jones
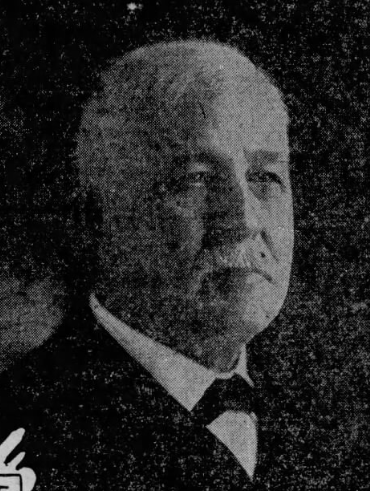
- Photo c. 1927

1st North Carolina Commissioner of Labor
- In office March 5, 1887 – February 15, 1889

Personal details
- Born: July 2, 1852 Wake County, North Carolina
- Died: October 20, 1928 (aged 76)

Wesley Norwood Jones (July 2, 1852 – October 20, 1928) was an American politician who served as the first North Carolina Commissioner of Labor.

== Early life and education ==
Jones was born on July 2, 1852, in Wake County, North Carolina. He was apprenticed as a printer at 13 years old. In the fall of 1875, he enrolled at Wake Forest University, graduating in 1879.

== North Carolina Commissioner of Labor ==
While serving as a member of the board of aldermen (equivalent of the later city council) of Raleigh, Jones was appointed to the new office of North Carolina Commissioner of Labor by Governor Alfred M. Scales on March 15, 1887, for a two-year term. Many members of the Knights of Labor, which had lobbied for the creation of the office, were angered by the appointment of Jones, noting his background as a lawyer and not as a tradesman. Jones subsequently hired Raleigh Knights leader J. M. Broughton to work in his office, engendering further distrust, as they feared Jones would glean Broughton's knowledge of the Knights' affairs to thwart their goals. In his 1887 annual report on labor conditions in North Carolina, Jones concluded that "employers of the State, for the most part, are disposed to be just to their employees". When his term expired, Governor Daniel G. Fowle replaced him with John C. Scarborough.

== Death ==
Jones was found dead in his bed in Raleigh on October 20, 1928.

== Works cited ==
- Beckel, Deborah (2011). Radical Reform: Interracial Politics in Post-Emancipation North Carolina. Charlottesville: University of Virginia Press. ISBN 978-0-8139-3002-2.
