= Debbie Greenwood =

British television presenter (born 1959)

- Born: 16 September 1959 (age 66); Liverpool, England
- Occupations: Television presenter; wedding celebrant
- Years active: 1984–present
- Spouse: Paul Coia (m. 1992)
- Children: 2
- Website: https://www.debbiegreenwoodceremonies.com/

Debbie Greenwood (born 16 September 1959) is a British television presenter and wedding celebrant. She won the title of Miss Great Britain in 1984.

== Early life ==
Greenwood grew up in Liverpool.

== Career ==
Greenwood began her broadcasting career in 1984, presenting regional programmes for Granada Television. She then moved to the BBC's Breakfast Time (1985–1986), which included broadcasting from a special studio outside Buckingham Palace for the wedding of Prince Andrew and Sarah Ferguson.

From 1987 to 1989, Greenwood presented on BBC Radio 2 daytime programmes, beginning with standing in for Gloria Hunniford at Christmas 1987. She later presented Streetwise (1989–1990) for The Channel 4 Daily. She also presented the UK version of the short-lived game show Love Me, Love Me Not in 1988, as well as the more successful BBC quiz for schoolchildren First Class, which aired on BBC1 from 1986 to 1988.

Greenwood has since worked for a variety of UK-based satellite and cable shopping channels, including TV Travel Shop, Bid TV, The Craft Channel, and twelve years presenting for QVC, starting in 2001.

== Personal life ==
Greenwood married broadcaster Paul Coia in October 1992, with whom she has two daughters. She lives in Kingston upon Thames, south-western Greater London. The home contains part of the original red leather sofa used on Breakfast Time, which the BBC gave to Greenwood as a parting gift.
