= List of justices of the North Carolina Supreme Court =

Following is a list of justices of the North Carolina Supreme Court.

== Current justices ==
The court's current members are:

Seat	Name	Born	Start	Term ends (Note: Term ends on December 31 of the year listed.)	Mandatory retirement (Note: North Carolina judges must retire by the last day of the month in which they turn age 76.)	Party	Law school
Chief Justice	Paul Martin Newby	May 5, 1955 (age 71)	November 29, 2004 (Note: Originally elected as Associate Justice. Elected as Chief Justice in 2020 and began term on January 1, 2021.)	2028	May 31, 2031	Republican	North Carolina
1	Anita Earls	February 20, 1960 (age 66)	January 1, 2019	2026	February 29, 2036	Democratic	Yale
2	Phil Berger Jr.	March 26, 1972 (age 54)	January 1, 2021	2028	March 31, 2048	Republican	Wake Forest
4	Tamara P. Barringer	December 1, 1958 (age 67)	January 1, 2021	2028	December 31, 2034	Republican	North Carolina
3	Richard Dietz	February 1, 1977 (age 49)	January 1, 2023	2030	February 28, 2053	Republican	Wake Forest
5	Trey Allen	November 20, 1974 (age 51)	January 1, 2023	2030	November 30, 2050	Republican	North Carolina
6	Allison Riggs	May 8, 1981 (age 45)	September 13, 2023 (Note: Initially appointed by Gov. Roy Cooper (D). Subsequently elected to a full term in 2024.)	2032	May 31, 2057	Democratic	Florida

== Former justices ==
Judge	Began active service	Ended active service	Notes
William J. Adams	1921	1934	.
William Reynolds Allen	1911	1921	.
Thomas Samuel Ashe	1878	1887	.
Alphonso C. Avery	1889	1897	.
M. V. Barnhill	1937	1956	Chief Justice (1954–1956)
William Horn Battle	1848; 1852	1848; 1868	.
Cheri Beasley	2013	2021	Chief Justice (2019–2021)
Rhoda Billings	1985	1986	Chief Justice (1986)
William H. Bobbitt	1954	1974	Chief Justice (1969–1974)
Nathaniel Boyden	1872	1873	.
Edward Thomas Brady	2003	2010	.
Joseph Branch	1966	1986	Chief Justice (1979–1986)
David M. Britt	1978	1982	.
Walter E. Brock	1979	1980	.
Willis J. Brogden	1926	1935	.
George H. Brown	1905	1920	.
Armistead Burwell	1892	1894	.
G. K. Butterfield	2001	2002	.
William P. Bynum	1873	1878	.
J. Phil Carlton	1979	1983	.
Walter Clark	1889	1924	Chief Justice (1903–1924)
Heriot Clarkson	1923	1942	.
Henry G. Connor	1903	1909	.
Charles A. Cooke	1901	1903	.
J. William Copeland	1975	1985	.
Joseph J. Daniel	1832	1848	.
Joseph J. Davis	1887	1892	.
Mark A. Davis	2019	2021	.
Emery B. Denny	1942	1966	Chief Justice (1962–1966)
William A. Devin	1935	1954	Chief Justice (1951–1954)
Robert P. Dick	1868	1872	.
John H. Dillard	1878	1881	.
Robert M. Douglas	1896	1904	.
Robert H. Edmunds Jr.	2001	2016	.
Sam Ervin	1948	1954	.
Sam J. Ervin IV	2015	2022	.
James G. Exum	1974	1995	Chief Justice (1986–1995)
William T. Faircloth	1895	1901	Chief Justice (1895–1901)
Franklin Freeman	2000	2000	.
Henry Frye	1983	2001	Chief Justice (1999–2001)
David M. Furches	1894	1903	Chief Justice (1901–1903)
William Gaston	1833	1844	.
John Hall	1819	1832	.
Leonard Henderson	1818	1833	Chief Justice (1829–1833)
Carlisle W. Higgins	1954	1974	.
William A. Hoke	1904	1925	Chief Justice (1924–1925)
Robin E. Hudson	2007	2022	.
Robert N. Hunter Jr.	2014	2014	.
J. Frank Huskins	1968	1982	.
Barbara Jackson	2011	2018	.
Jefferson D. Johnson Jr.	1950	1960	.
I. Beverly Lake	1985; 1992; 1994	1990; 1992; 2006	Chief Justice (2001–2006)
I. Beverly Lake Sr.	1965	1978	.
James C. MacRae	1892	1895	.
Matthias Evans Manly	1860	1865	.
James S. Manning	1909	1911	.
Harry C. Martin	1982	1992	.
Mark Martin	1999	2019	Chief Justice (2014–2019)
Augustus Summerfield Merrimon	1883	1892	Chief Justice (1889–1892)
Louis B. Meyer	1981	1994	.
Burley Mitchell	1982	1999	Chief Justice (1995–1999)
Walter A. Montgomery	1894	1905	.
Dan K. Moore	1969	1978	
Michael R. Morgan	2017	2023	
Frederick Nash	1844	1858	Chief Justice (1852–1858)
Robert F. Orr	1994	2004	.
Francis I. Parker	1986	1986	
R. Hunt Parker	1952	1969	Chief Justice (1966–1969)
Sarah Parker	1993	2014	Chief Justice (2006–2014)
Richmond Mumford Pearson	1848	1878	Chief Justice (1859–1878); First Chief Justice elected by the people (in the 1868 election).
Edwin Godwin Reade	1868	1879	.
William B. Rodman	1868	1879	.
William B. Rodman Jr.	1956	1965	.
Thomas Ruffin	1829; 1858	1852; 1859	Chief Justice (1833–1852)
Thomas Ruffin Jr.	1881	1883	.
Michael Schenck	1934	1948	.
Aaron A. F. Seawell	1938	1950	.
Thomas Settle	1868	1871	.
Susie Sharp	1962	1979	Chief Justice (1975–1979)
James E. Shepherd	1888	1895	Chief Justice (1893–1895)
William N. H. Smith	1878	1889	Chief Justice (1878–1889)
Walter P. Stacy	1920	1951	Chief Justice (1925–1951)
John Louis Taylor	1818	1829	First Chief Justice (1818–1829)
Patricia Timmons-Goodson	2006	2012	
John D. Toomer	1829	1829	.
Itimous T. Valentine Sr.	1951	1952	.
Lycurgus R. Varser	1925	1925	.
Earl W. Vaughn	1985	1985	.
George L. Wainwright Jr.	1998	2006	.
Platt D. Walker	1903	1923	.
John Webb	1986	1998	.
Willis Whichard	1986	1998	.
J. Wallace Winborne	1937	1962	Chief Justice (1956–1962)
James Andrew Wynn	1998	1998	.
