= 2022 North Carolina judicial elections =

2022 North Carolina Supreme Court elections
- November 8, 2022

2 of 7 seats of the Supreme Court of North Carolina
	Majority party	Minority party
Party	Republican	Democratic
Last election	3 seats, 50.63%	0 seats, 49.37%
Seats before	3	4
Seats won	2	0
Seats after	5	2
Seat change	▲2	▼2
Popular vote	3,923,280 (Note: Popular vote figures represent the total amounts of Democratic and Republican votes)	3,579,523 (Note: Popular vote figures represent the total amounts of Democratic and Republican votes)
Percentage	52.29%	47.71%

Two justices of the seven-member North Carolina Supreme Court and four judges of the fifteen-member North Carolina Court of Appeals were elected by North Carolina voters on November 8, 2022, concurrently with other state elections. Terms for seats on each court are eight years. These elections were conducted on a partisan basis.

Primary elections were originally set to be held on March 8, 2022, but were delayed by order of the state Supreme Court, and then rescheduled for May 17, 2022. Candidate filing began on December 6, 2021, but was suspended by the court's order. Filing later resumed, and ended on March 4, 2022.

Republicans won both seats on the Supreme Court flipping them from Democratic control and giving themselves a 5–2 majority. They also won all four races for the Court of Appeals flipping two from Democratic control and holding the two others.

== Supreme Court seat 3 ==
2022 North Carolina Supreme Court seat 3 election
- November 8, 2022
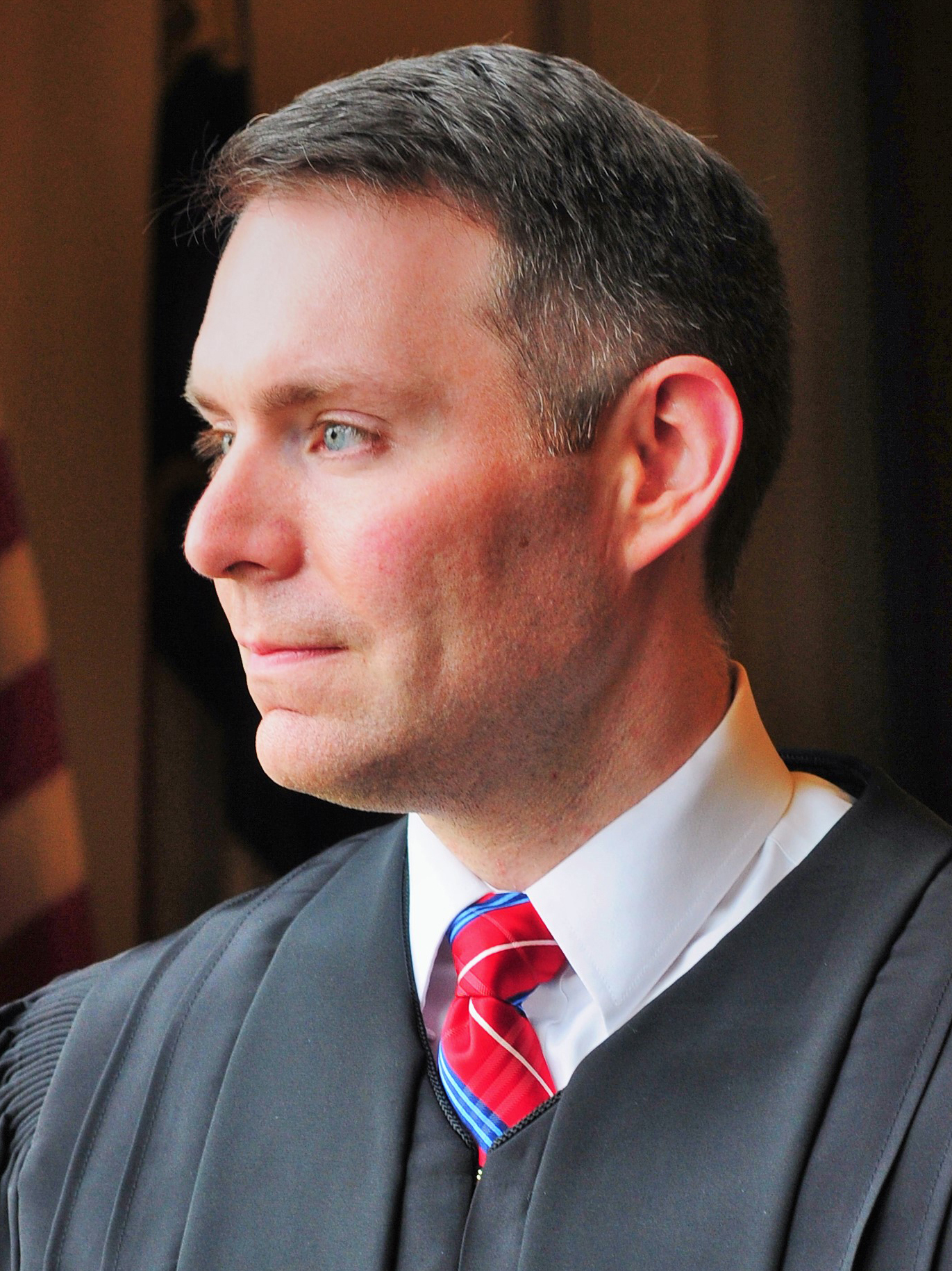

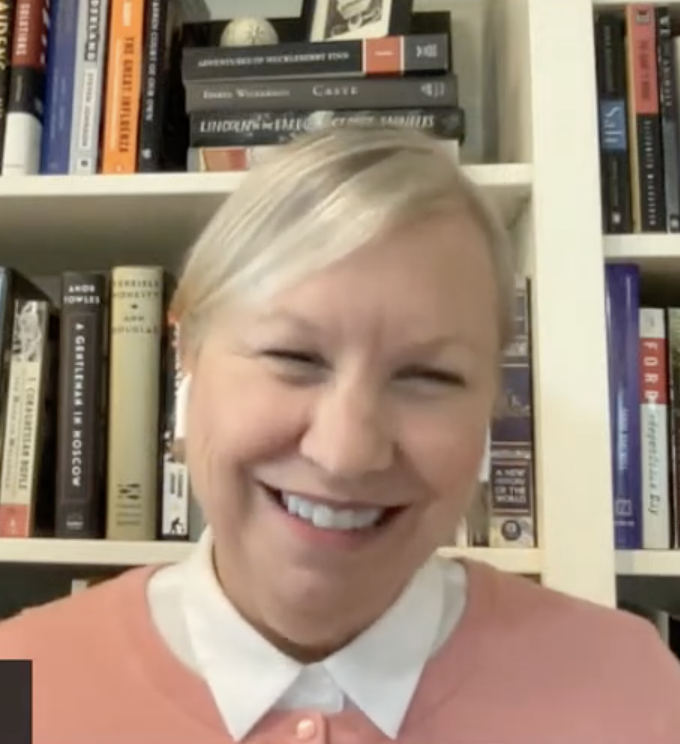
Nominee	Richard Dietz	Lucy Inman
Party	Republican	Democratic
Popular vote	1,965,840	1,786,650
Percentage	52.39%	47.61%
- Dietz: 50–60% 60–70% 70–80% 80–90% >90% Inman: 50–60% 60–70% 70–80% 80–90% >90% Tie: 50%
Associate Justice before election
Robin Hudson
Democratic
Elected Associate Justice
Richard Dietz
Republican

This seat was held by Associate Justice Robin Hudson, a Democrat, who had held the seat since 2007. There was some speculation that Hudson would choose to not run for re-election, due to the fact that she was nearing the mandatory retirement age of 72. Hudson's mandatory retirement would be February 29, 2024. If she were re-elected to another term, she would only be able to serve a little over 13 months of her eight-year term.

On December 1, 2021, Hudson announced that she would not be seeking re-election. Court of Appeals Judge Lucy Inman ran for this seat.

=== Democratic primary ===
==== Nominee ====
- Lucy Inman, Judge of the North Carolina Court of Appeals, candidate for Supreme Court in 2020

==== Declined ====
- Robin Hudson, incumbent Associate Justice

=== Republican primary ===
==== Nominee ====
- Richard Dietz, Judge of the North Carolina Court of Appeals

=== General election ===
==== Polling ====
Poll source	Date(s) administered	Sample size (Note: Key: A – all adults RV – registered voters LV – likely voters V – unclear)	Margin of error	Lucy Inman (D)	Richard Dietz (R)	Undecided
Cygnal (R)	October 20–22, 2022	600 (LV)	± 4.0%	42%	49%	9%
SurveyUSA	September 28 – October 2, 2022	677 (LV)	± 4.4%	32%	37%	31%
Cygnal (R)	September 24–26, 2022	650 (LV)	± 3.75%	41%	45%	15%
Cygnal (R)	August 13–15, 2022	615 (LV)	± 3.9%	39%	45%	15%
Cygnal (R)	June 17–19, 2022	600 (LV)	± 4.0%	38%	49%	13%
Cygnal (R)	May 21–22, 2022	600 (LV)	± 4.0%	40%	44%	16%
Meeting Street Insights (R) (Note: This poll was sponsored by the Carolina Partnership for Reform)	May 12–16, 2022	500 (LV)	± 4.4%	39%	45%	15%

==== Results ====
2022 North Carolina Supreme Court seat 3 election
Party	Candidate	Votes	%
Republican	Richard Dietz	1,965,840	52.39%
Democratic	Lucy Inman	1,786,650	47.61%
Total votes		3,752,490	100.0%
Republican gain from Democratic			

== Supreme Court seat 5 ==
2022 North Carolina Supreme Court seat 5 election
- November 8, 2022

Nominee	Trey Allen	Sam Ervin IV
Party	Republican	Democratic
Popular vote	1,957,440	1,792,873
Percentage	52.19%	47.81%
- Allen: 50–60% 60–70% 70–80% 80–90% >90% Ervin: 50–60% 60–70% 70–80% 80–90% >90% Tie: 50%
Associate Justice before election
Sam Ervin IV
Democratic
Elected Associate Justice
Trey Allen
Republican

This seat was held by Associate Justice Sam Ervin IV, a Democrat, who had held the seat since 2015. Ervin ran for re-election to a second term.

=== Democratic primary ===
==== Nominee ====
- Sam Ervin IV, incumbent Associate Justice

=== Republican primary ===
==== Nominee ====
- Trey Allen, general counsel for the North Carolina Administration of Courts, professor at UNC-Chapel Hill

==== Eliminated in primary ====
- Victoria E. Prince, family law attorney
- April C. Wood, Judge of the North Carolina Court of Appeals

==== Endorsements ====
Trey Allen

State and local officials

- Phil Berger, state senator (since 2001) and president pro tempore of the North Carolina Senate (since 2011)
- Paul Newton, state senator (since 2017)

==== Polling ====
Poll source	Date(s) administered	Sample size	Margin of error	Trey Allen	Victoria Prince	April Wood	Undecided
Atlantic Polling Strategies (R)	April 25–28, 2022	534 (LV)	± 4.9%	18%	4%	10%	68%
Cygnal (R)	April 1–3, 2022	600 (LV)	± 4.0%	10%	2%	7%	82%
Vitale & Associates (R)	March 22–23, 2022	504 (LV)	± 4.4%	6%	3%	8%	82%

==== Results ====
Results by county Allen: 40–50%; 50–60%; 60–70%; 70–80%; Wood: 40–50%; 50–60%; 60–70%

Republican primary results
Party	Candidate	Votes	%
Republican	Trey Allen	385,124	55.39%
Republican	April C. Wood	252,504	36.32%
Republican	Victoria E. Prince	57,672	8.29%
Total votes		695,300	100.0%

=== General election ===
==== Polling ====
Poll source	Date(s) administered	Sample size	Margin of error	Sam Ervin IV (D)	Trey Allen (R)	Undecided
Cygnal (R)	October 20–22, 2022	600 (LV)	± 4.0%	42%	49%	9%
SurveyUSA	September 28 – October 2, 2022	677 (LV)	± 4.4%	37%	39%	24%
Cygnal (R)	September 24–26, 2022	650 (LV)	± 3.75%	39%	46%	15%
Cygnal (R)	August 13–15, 2022	615 (LV)	± 3.9%	40%	45%	15%
Cygnal (R)	June 17–19, 2022	600 (LV)	± 4.0%	39%	49%	12%
Cygnal (R)	May 21–22, 2022	600 (LV)	± 4.0%	40%	46%	14%
Meeting Street Insights (R)	May 12–16, 2022	500 (LV)	± 4.4%	42%	46%	12%

==== Results ====
2022 North Carolina Supreme Court seat 5 election
Party	Candidate	Votes	%
Republican	Trey Allen	1,957,440	52.19%
Democratic	Sam Ervin IV (incumbent)	1,792,873	47.81%
Total votes		3,750,313	100.0%
Republican gain from Democratic			

== Court of Appeals seat 8 (Inman seat) ==
2022 North Carolina Court of Appeals seat 8 election
- November 8, 2022

Nominee	Julee Tate Flood	Carolyn Jennings Thompson
Party	Republican	Democratic
Popular vote	1,941,252	1,747,634
Percentage	52.6%	47.4%
- Flood: 50–60% 60–70% 70–80% 80–90% >90% Thompson: 50–60% 60–70% 70–80% 80–90% >90% Tie: 50%
Court of Appeals Judge before election
Lucy Inman
Democratic
Elected Court of Appeals Judge
Julee Tate Flood
Republican

Lucy Inman, a Democrat, was elected to this seat in 2014. Inman ran for a seat on the Supreme Court in 2022 rather than seek reelection.

=== Democratic primary ===
As only one Democrat filed to run for this seat, a primary was not held.

==== Nominee ====
- Carolyn Jennings Thompson, former District Court and former Superior Court judge

==== Declined ====
- Lucy Inman, Court of Appeals Judge (2015–present) and candidate for Supreme Court in 2020

=== Republican primary ===
As only one Republican filed to run for this seat, a primary was not held.

==== Nominee ====
- Julee Tate Flood

=== General election ===
==== Results ====
North Carolina Court of Appeals seat 8 election, 2022
Party	Candidate	Votes	%
Republican	Julee Tate Flood	1,941,252	52.62%
Democratic	Carolyn Jennings Thompson	1,747,634	47.38%
Total votes		3,688,886	100.00%
Republican gain from Democratic			

== Court of Appeals seat 9 (Stroud seat) ==
2022 North Carolina Court of Appeals seat 9 election
- November 8, 2022

Nominee	Donna Stroud	Brad A. Salmon
Party	Republican	Democratic
Popular vote	2,012,454	1,673,631
Percentage	54.6%	45.4%
- Stroud: 50–60% 60–70% 70–80% 80–90% >90% Salmon: 50–60% 60–70% 70–80% 80–90% >90%
Court of Appeals Judge before election
Donna Stroud
Republican
Elected Court of Appeals Judge
Donna Stroud
Republican

Donna Stroud, a Republican, was first elected to the Court of Appeals in 2006 and subsequently re-elected. She was appointed to the position of Chief Judge by then-Chief Justice Cheri Beasley and assumed that role on January 1, 2021. Stroud ran for re-election.

=== Democratic primary ===
As only one Democrat filed to run for this seat, a primary was not held.

==== Nominee ====
- Brad A. Salmon, District Court Judge and former state representative (2015–2016)

=== Republican primary ===
==== Nominee ====
- Donna Stroud, Court of Appeals Judge (2007–present) (Chief Judge 2021–present)

==== Eliminated in primary ====
- Beth Freshwater Smith, District Court Judge

==== Polling ====
Poll source	Date(s) administered	Sample size	Margin of error	Beth Freshwater-Smith	Donna Stroud	Undecided
Vitale & Associates (R)	March 22–23, 2022	504 (LV)	± 4.4%	4%	8%	87%

==== Endorsements ====
Beth Freshwater Smith

State and local officials

- Phil Berger Jr., Associate Justice of the North Carolina Supreme Court (since 2021) and former Judge of the North Carolina Court of Appeals (2017–2021)
- Jimmy Dixon, state representative (since 2011)
- Keith Kidwell, state representative (since 2019)
- Jim Perry, state senator (since 2019)
Donna Stroud

State and local officials

- Bob Edmunds, former Associate Justice of the North Carolina Supreme Court (2001–2016)
- Bob Hunter, former Associate Justice of the North Carolina Supreme Court (2014) and former Judge of the North Carolina Court of Appeals (2008–2014)

==== Results ====
Results by county Stroud: 50–60%; 60–70%; 70–80%; Freshwater Smith: 50–60%; 60–70%; 70–80%

Republican primary results
Party	Candidate	Votes	%
Republican	Donna Stroud (incumbent)	400,119	59.28%
Republican	Beth Freshwater Smith	274,861	40.72%
Total votes		674,980	100.00%

=== General election ===
==== Results ====
North Carolina Court of Appeals seat 9 election, 2022
Party	Candidate	Votes	%
Republican	Donna Stroud (incumbent)	2,012,454	54.60%
Democratic	Brad A. Salmon	1,673,631	45.40%
Total votes		3,686,085	100.00%
Republican hold			

== Court of Appeals seat 10 (Tyson seat) ==
2022 North Carolina Court of Appeals seat 10 election
- November 8, 2022

Nominee	John Tyson	Gale Murray Adams
Party	Republican	Democratic
Popular vote	1,951,890	1,734,513
Percentage	52.9%	47.1%
- Tyson: 50–60% 60–70% 70–80% 80–90% >90% Adams: 50–60% 60–70% 70–80% 80–90% >90%
Court of Appeals Judge before election
John Tyson
Republican
Elected Court of Appeals Judge
John Tyson
Republican

John Tyson, a Republican, was elected to this seat in 2014 after previously serving on the court from 2001 to 2009. Tyson ran for re-election.

=== Democratic primary ===
As only one Democrat filed to run for this seat, a primary was not held.

==== Nominee ====
- Gale Murray Adams, Cumberland County Superior Court Judge

=== Republican primary ===
As only one Republican filed to run for this seat, a primary was not held.

==== Nominee ====
- John Tyson, Court of Appeals Judge (2001–2009; 2015–2021)

=== General election ===
==== Results ====
North Carolina Court of Appeals seat 10 election, 2022
Party	Candidate	Votes	%
Republican	John Tyson (incumbent)	1,951,890	52.95%
Democratic	Gale Murray Adams	1,734,513	47.05%
Total votes		3,686,403	100.00%
Republican hold			

== Court of Appeals seat 11 (Jackson seat) ==
2022 North Carolina Court of Appeals seat 11 election
- November 8, 2022

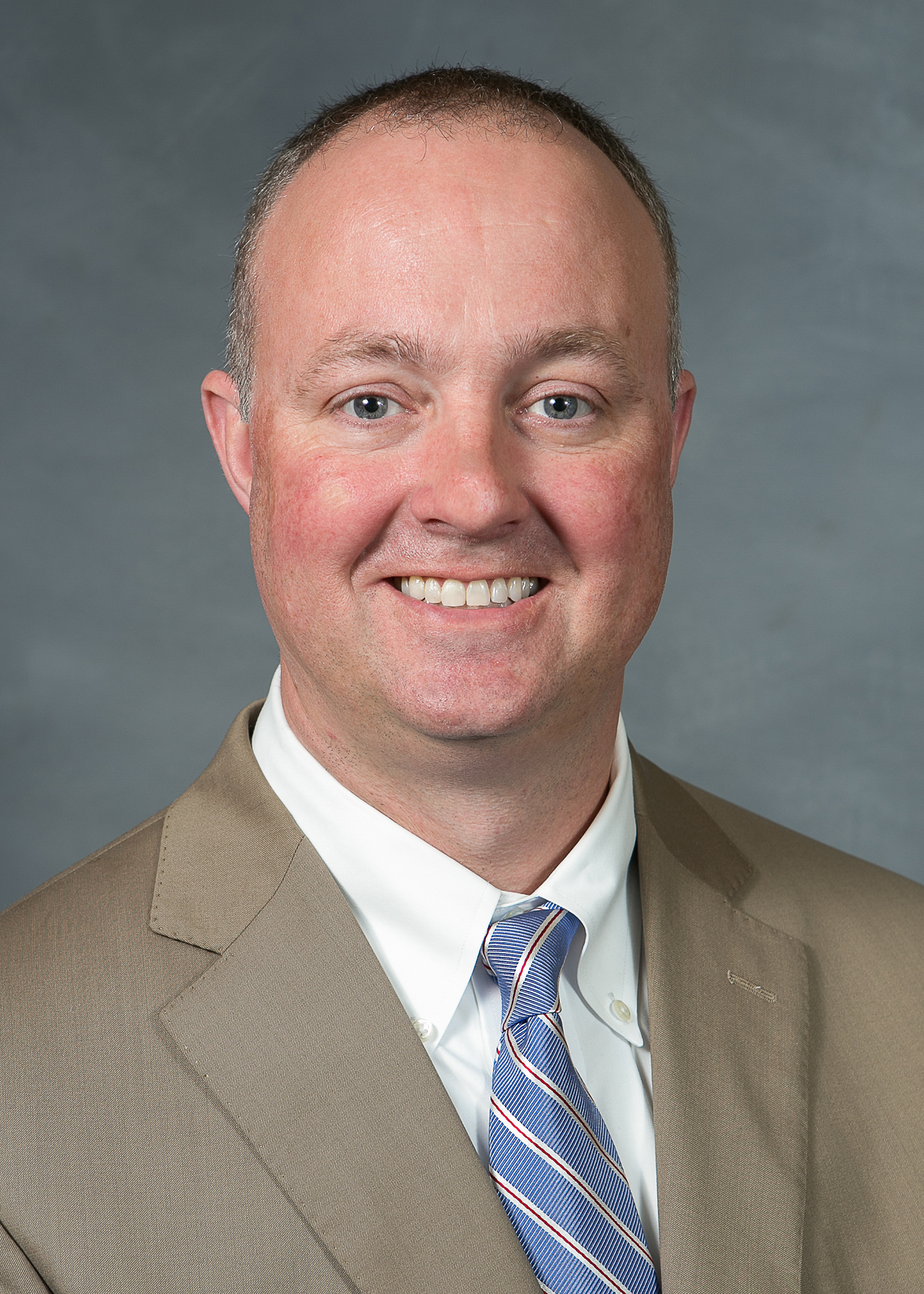
Nominee	Michael J. Stading	Darren Jackson
Party	Republican	Democratic
Popular vote	1,953,052	1,727,967
Percentage	53.1%	46.9%
- Stading: 50–60% 60–70% 70–80% 80–90% >90% Jackson: 50–60% 60–70% 70–80% 80–90% >90% Tie: 50%
Court of Appeals Judge before election
Darren Jackson
Democratic
Elected Court of Appeals Judge
Michael J. Stading
Republican

Darren Jackson, a Democrat, was appointed to this seat by Governor Roy Cooper in 2020, to fill the vacancy created by Phil Berger Jr.'s election to the Supreme Court. Jackson ran for election to a full term.

=== Democratic primary ===
As only one Democrat filed to run for this seat, a primary was not held.

==== Nominee ====
- Darren Jackson, Court of Appeals Judge (2021–present), former state representative (2009–2020), former minority leader of the North Carolina House of Representatives (2017–2020)

=== Republican primary ===
==== Nominee ====
- Michael J. Stading, Air Force JAG (judge advocate) and former prosecutor

==== Eliminated in primary ====
- Charlton L. Allen, former member of the North Carolina Industrial Commission and former chair of Iredell County Republican Party

==== Results ====
Results by county Stading: 50–60%; 60–70%; 70–80%; 80–90%

Republican primary results
Party	Candidate	Votes	%
Republican	Michael J. Stading	469,419	70.76%
Republican	Charlton L. Allen	194,022	29.24%
Total votes		663,441	100.00%

=== General election ===
==== Results ====
North Carolina Court of Appeals seat 11 election, 2022
Party	Candidate	Votes	%
Republican	Michael J. Stading	1,953,052	53.06%
Democratic	Darren Jackson (incumbent)	1,727,967	46.94%
Total votes		3,681,019	100.00%
Republican gain from Democratic			

== Aftermath ==
The new Republican majority court ruled on April 28, 2023 that partisan gerrymandering was not a judicial issue. As a result, North Carolina Republicans made a new map that took the split 7-7 delegation and turned it into a 10-4 Republican delegation. Because Republicans only won the 2024 United States House of Representatives elections by 3 seats, the restricting was seen as crucial to Republicans holding their majority. Additionally, the courts also upheld the photo ID law that they had struck down before the elections.

== Notes ==
Partisan clients
