= 2016 North Carolina judicial elections =

One justice of the seven-member North Carolina Supreme Court and five judges of the 15-member North Carolina Court of Appeals were elected by North Carolina voters on November 8, 2016, concurrently with other state elections. Terms for seats on each court are eight years.

Elections for seats on both courts were technically nonpartisan, but under a bill passed by the legislature and signed into law by Gov. Pat McCrory in 2015, House Bill 8, the party affiliations of Court of Appeals candidates were printed on the ballot. Court of Appeals candidates of all party affiliations would still run in one primary under the law, while the top two vote-getters, regardless of party, would advance to the general election. Primary elections would have been held on March 15, 2016, for seats with more than two candidates, but in the end, only two candidates filed for each Court of Appeals seat.

== Supreme Court (Seat 6) ==
2016 North Carolina Supreme Court election
- November 8, 2016

1 seat of the Supreme Court of North Carolina
	Majority party	Minority party
Party	Democratic	Republican
Last election	3	4
Seats won	1	0
Seats after	4	3
Seat change	▲1	▼1

North Carolina Supreme Court Associate Justice (Seat 6) general election, 2016
- November 8, 2016
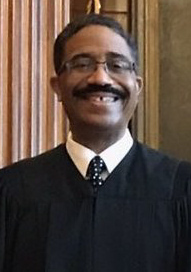

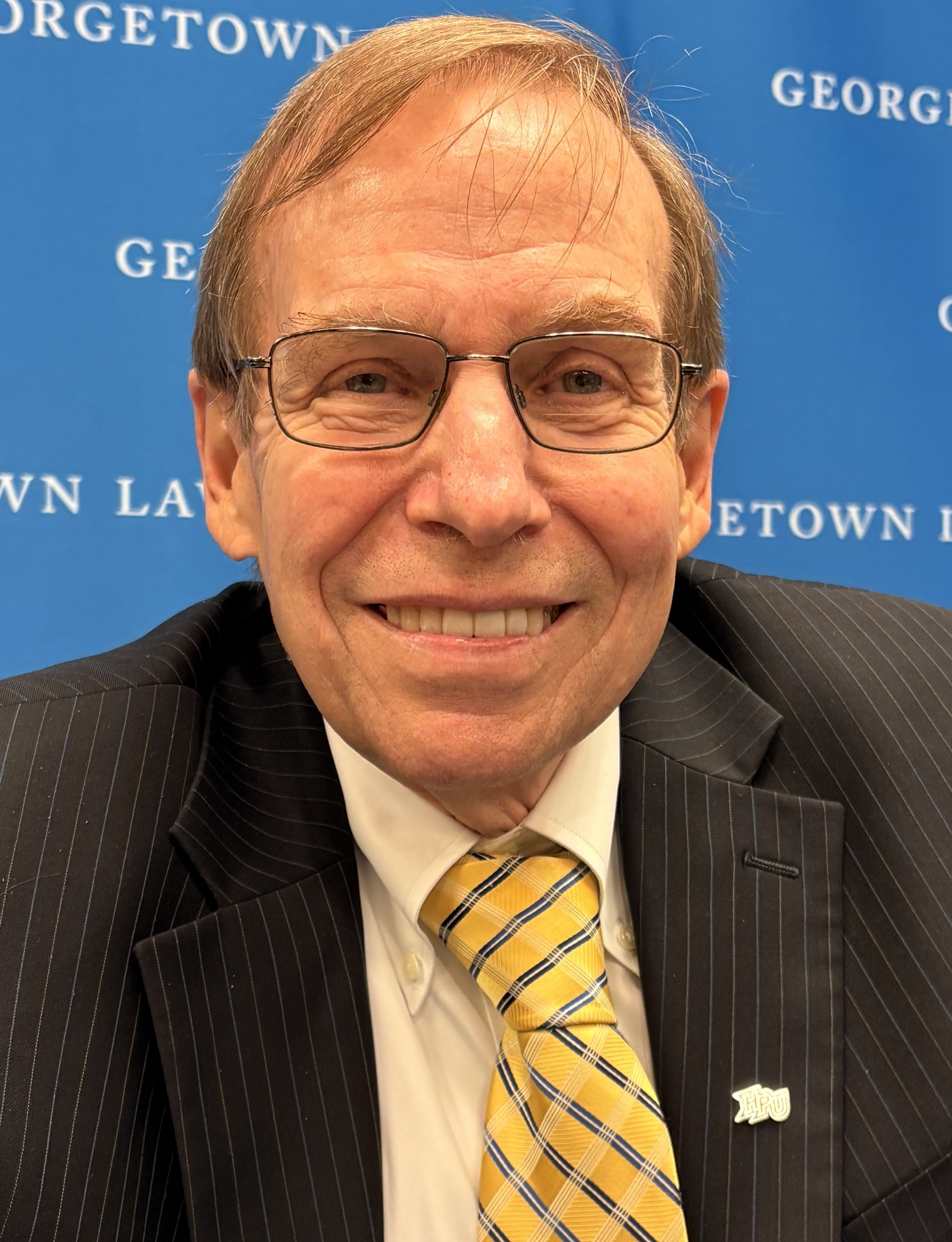
Candidate	Michael Morgan	Robert Edmunds Jr.
Popular vote	2,157,927	1,803,425
Percentage	54.47%	45.53%
- County results Morgan: 50–60% 60–70% 70–80% Edmunds: 50–60%
Associate Justice before election
Robert Edmunds Jr.
Elected Associate Justice
Michael Morgan

The seat held by Robert Edmunds Jr. was on the 2016 ballot. Under current state law, Edmunds would have to relinquish his seat in 2021 if he was re-elected in 2016, because he would reach mandatory retirement age.

A 2015 change in state law was set to make Edmunds the first sitting justice who had the option of running in a retention election rather than running against other candidates. Edmunds chose that option, which would have meant that the state's voters would only be able to vote "for" or "against" Edmunds in the November election. If a majority of voters voted "against," the Governor would appoint a new justice to serve until the next general election. Critics cast this as an attempt by Republicans in the legislature to maintain the 4-3 Republican majority on the Court. Edmunds is a Republican, as is the current governor, who would appoint any replacement. Attorney Sabra Faires and two voters filed a lawsuit, claiming the new election method violated the Constitution of North Carolina and was not an election at all, but a referendum. A three-judge panel found in favor of Faires and the two voters, and the State Board of Elections established a new candidate filing period of March 16–25. If more than two candidates filed for the seat, there would be a primary election on June 7. On appeal, the state Supreme Court deadlocked 3–3 (with Edmunds recusing himself) on the constitutionality of the retention election, leaving the lower court ruling intact.

Edmunds and Faires both filed to run for the seat on March 16. Wake County Superior Court Judge Michael Morgan then filed on March 21, and was joined later by attorney Daniel Robertson, setting up a primary. Justice Edmunds was the only registered Republican as Faires was registered unaffiliated, and both Judge Morgan and Robertson were registered Democrats.

Morgan defeated Edmunds in the general election, garnering more than 54 percent of the vote. Morgan's victory gave the Supreme Court a Democratic majority for the first time since the 1998 elections.

=== Primary election ===
==== Candidates ====
- Robert Edmunds Jr., incumbent Associate Justice
- Sabra Jean Faires, former assistant North Carolina Secretary of Revenue
- Michael Morgan, Judge of the Wake County Superior Court (District 10)
- Dan Robertson, former general counsel for the Bank of the Carolinas
Robert Edmunds Jr.

Statewide officials

- Pat McCrory, incumbent Governor of North Carolina

Political parties

- North Carolina Republican Party

Organizations

- NC Police Benevolent Association
- NC Troopers Association

Newspapers and other media

- The Charlotte Observer
Sabra Faires

Labor unions

- NC AFL-CIO
Michael Morgan

Federal officials

- Barack Obama, President of the United States

Organizations

- NC Sierra Club
- Peoples Alliance PAC

Newspapers and other media

- Indy Week
- The News & Observer

North Carolina Supreme Court Associate Justice (Seat 6) primary election, 2016
Party	Candidate	Votes	%
Nonpartisan	Robert Edmunds Jr. (incumbent)	235,405	48.01%
Nonpartisan	Michael Morgan	168,498	34.36%
Nonpartisan	Sabra Jean Faires	59,040	12.04%
Nonpartisan	Daniel Robertson	27,401	5.59%
Total votes		490,344	100%

=== General election ===
Poll source	Date(s) administered	Sample size	Margin of error	Bob Edmunds	Mike Morgan	Undecided
Public Policy Polling	August 5–7, 2016	830 (LV)	± 3.4%	21%	21%	58%
Public Policy Polling	June 20–21, 2016	947 (RV)	± 3.2%	28%	24%	48%

North Carolina Supreme Court Associate Justice (Seat 6) general election, 2016
Party	Candidate	Votes	%
Nonpartisan	Michael Morgan	2,157,927	54.47%
Nonpartisan	Robert Edmunds Jr. (incumbent)	1,803,425	45.53%
Total votes		3,961,352	100%

== Court of Appeals (Seat 11) ==
The seat held by Linda Stephens was on the 2016 ballot. A Democrat, she ran for re-election, and was endorsed by former Chief Judges of the Court of Appeals John Martin, Sidney Eagles Jr., and S. Gerald Arnold.

Under current state law, Stephens would have to relinquish her seat in 2022 if she was re-elected in 2016, because she will reach mandatory retirement age.

=== Candidates ===
- Phil Berger Jr. (Republican), Rockingham County district attorney
- Linda Stephens (Democratic), incumbent Judge

Results by county Berger: 50–60%; 60–70%; 70–80%; Stephens: 50–60%; 60–70%; 70–80%

North Carolina Court of Appeals Judge (Seat 11) general election, 2016
Party	Candidate	Votes	%
Republican	Phil Berger Jr.	2,233,730	50.25%
Democratic	Linda Stephens (incumbent)	2,211,631	49.75%
Total votes		4,445,361	100%
Republican gain from Democratic			

== Court of Appeals (Seat 12) ==
The seat held by Richard Dietz, who was appointed to the Court in 2014, was on the 2016 ballot.

=== Candidates ===
- Richard Dietz (Republican), incumbent Judge
- Vince Rozier (Democratic), Wake County district court judge

Results by county Dietz: 50–60%; 60–70%; 70–80%; 80–90%; Rozier: 50–60%; 60–70%; 70–80%

North Carolina Court of Appeals Judge (Seat 12) general election, 2016
Party	Candidate	Votes	%
Republican	Richard Dietz (incumbent)	2,353,604	53.47%
Democratic	Vince Rozier	2,048,367	46.53%
Total votes		4,401,971	100%
Republican hold			

== Court of Appeals (Seat 13) ==
The seat held by Robert Hunter Jr. was on the 2016 ballot. Under current state law, Hunter would have to relinquish his seat in 2019 if he was re-elected in 2016, because he will reach mandatory retirement age.

=== Candidates ===
- Abe Jones (Democratic), Wake County superior court judge
- Robert Hunter Jr. (Republican), incumbent Judge

Results by county Hunter: 50–60%; 60–70%; 70–80%; 80–90%; Jones: 50–60%; 60–70%; 70–80%

North Carolina Court of Appeals Judge (Seat 13) general election, 2016
Party	Candidate	Votes	%
Republican	Robert Hunter Jr. (incumbent)	2,403,059	54.37%
Democratic	Abe Jones	2,016,552	45.63%
Total votes		4,419,611	100%
Republican hold			

== Court of Appeals (Seat 14) ==
The seat held by Valerie Zachary was on the 2016 ballot. She was appointed to the seat in 2015 to replace retiring Judge Sanford Steelman. Zachary, a Republican, ran for a full term.

=== Candidates ===
- Rickye McKoy-Mitchell (Democratic), Mecklenburg County district court judge
- Valerie Zachary (Republican), incumbent Judge

Results by county Zachary: 50–60%; 60–70%; 70–80%; 80–90%; McKoy-Mitchell: 50–60%; 60–70%; 70–80%

North Carolina Court of Appeals Judge (Seat 14) general election, 2016
Party	Candidate	Votes	%
Republican	Valerie Zachary (incumbent)	2,361,232	53.81%
Democratic	Rickye McKoy-Mitchell	2,027,078	46.19%
Total votes		4,388,310	100%
Republican hold			

== Court of Appeals (Seat 15) ==
Judge Martha Geer announced on March 16, 2016, that she would resign to return to private practice. Consequently, the seat was on the November 2016 ballot. Because of the timing of Geer's resignation, there would be no primary election. In the interim, Gov. Pat McCrory appointed Chief District Court Judge Wendy Enochs to fill the seat.

Hunter Murphy, a Republican who ran for a Court of Appeals seat in 2014, declared his candidacy on March 17, 2016. Murphy is a trial attorney in Waynesville and was endorsed by retired North Carolina Supreme Court Justice Robert (Bob) Orr, the North Carolina Troopers Association and the North Carolina Fraternal Order of Police.

Wake County District Court Judge Margaret Eagles, a Democrat, was also a candidate for the seat, and was endorsed by Judge Geer, former Chief Justice Burley Mitchell, and the NC Police Benevolent Association.

Forsyth County-based attorney Donald R. Buie, not affiliated with any party, was also a candidate for this seat.

=== Candidates ===
- Donald R. Buie (Unaffiliated)
- Margaret Eagles (Democratic), Wake County district court judge
- Hunter Murphy (Republican), trial attorney

Results by county Murphy: 40–50%; 50–60%; 60–70%; 70–80%; Eagles: 40–50%; 50–60%; 60–70%; 70–80%

North Carolina Court of Appeals Judge (Seat 15) general election, 2016
Party	Candidate	Votes	%
Republican	Hunter Murphy	2,159,193	48.70%
Democratic	Margaret Eagles	2,021,769	45.60%
Independent	Donald Ray Buie	252,756	5.70%
Total votes		4,433,718	100%
Republican gain from Democratic			
