= 2014 North Carolina judicial elections =

2014 North Carolina Supreme Court elections
- November 4, 2014

4 seats of the Supreme Court of North Carolina
	Majority party	Minority party
Party	Republican	Democratic
Last election	4	3
Seats before	5	2
Seats won	1	3
Seats after	4	3
Seat change	▼1	▲1

Four justices of the seven-member North Carolina Supreme Court and four judges of the 15-member North Carolina Court of Appeals were elected by North Carolina voters on November 4, 2014, concurrently with other state elections. Terms for seats on each court are eight years.

Assessing the election results, Politifact writer Louis Jacobson noted that Supreme Court races in North Carolina and other states yielded "better-than-average results" for Democrats, who otherwise suffered heavy defeats across the country. "In a series of hotly contested North Carolina contests, two Democratic-leaning judges (Ervin and Hudson) prevailed, one Democrat (Beasley) was leading in a very close race, and one Republican (Chief Justice Martin) was re-elected," Jacobson wrote. At the Court of Appeals level, two Democrats, Lucy Inman and Mark Davis, and one Republican, John Tyson, were elected in contested races, while another Republican, Donna Stroud, was re-elected without opposition.

North Carolina ranked second among all states in total spending on judicial election campaigns in 2014.

== Supreme Court (Chief Justice) ==
North Carolina Supreme Court Chief Justice general election, 2014
- November 4, 2014
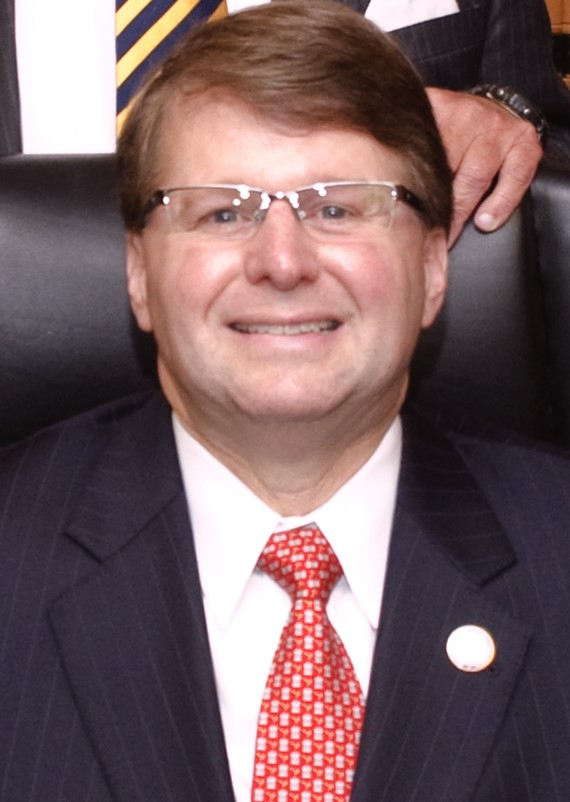

Candidate	Mark Martin	Ola Lewis
Popular vote	1,754,799	674,232
Percentage	72.24%	27.76%
Chief Justice before election
Mark Martin
Elected Chief Justice
Mark Martin

Chief Justice Sarah Parker stepped down from her position on the Court in August 2014 because she reached the mandatory retirement age of 72. Her seat would have been on the November 2014 election ballot in any event, since she was elected Chief Justice in 2006 to an eight-year term. Governor Pat McCrory appointed senior Associate Justice Mark Martin to occupy the Chief Justice position in the interim. Chief Justice Martin ran for the Chief Justice position for a full eight-year term. Martin was challenged in the general election by fellow Republican Ola Lewis, a Superior Court Judge.

- Mark Martin, incumbent Chief Justice
- Ola Lewis, Resident Judge of the Brunswick County Superior Court (District 13B)

Poll source	Date(s) administered	Sample size	Margin of error	Mark Martin	Ola Lewis	Other	Undecided
Public Policy Polling	September 11–14, 2014	1,266 (LV)	± 2.8%	16%	7%	—	77%

North Carolina Supreme Court Chief Justice general election, 2014
Party	Candidate	Votes	%
Nonpartisan	Mark Martin (incumbent)	1,754,799	72.24%
Nonpartisan	Ola M. Lewis	674,232	27.76%
Total votes		2,429,031	100%

== Supreme Court (Seat 3) ==
North Carolina Supreme Court Associate Justice (Seat 3) general election, 2014
- November 4, 2014

Candidate	Robin Hudson	Eric Levinson
Popular vote	1,283,478	1,163,022
Percentage	52.46%	47.54%
Associate Justice before election
Robin Hudson
Elected Associate Justice
Robin Hudson

Justice Robin Hudson ran for re-election to a second term. Notably, Hudson was the only incumbent challenged by more than 1 candidate, triggering a primary election, where the top two candidates advanced to the general election.

- Jeanette Doran, chair of the North Carolina Division of Employment Security Board of Review
- Robin Hudson, incumbent Associate Justice
- Eric Levinson, Judge of the Mecklenburg County Superior Court (District 26C)
Jeanette Doran

Organizations

- NC Experience Conservative Judges (co-endorsement with Levinson)
Robin Hudson

Statewide officials

- Jim Exum, former Chief Justice (1986–1995)
- Henry Frye, former Chief Justice (1999–2001)
- Elaine Marshall, incumbent North Carolina Secretary of State
- Burley Mitchell, former Chief Justice (1995–1999)

Labor unions

- NC AFL-CIO

Organizations

- NC Advocates for Justice
- NC Association of Educators

Political parties

- North Carolina Democratic Party

Newspapers and other media

- The Charlotte Observer
Eric Levinson

Statewide officials

- I. Beverly Lake Jr., former Chief Justice (2001–2006)
- Bob Orr, former Associate Justice (1995–2004)

Organizations

- NC Experience Conservative Judges (co-endorsement with Doran)

Political parties

- North Carolina Republican Party

North Carolina Supreme Court Associate Justice (Seat 3) primary election, 2014
Party	Candidate	Votes	%
Nonpartisan	Robin Hudson (incumbent)	381,836	42.56%
Nonpartisan	Eric Levinson	328,062	36.57%
Nonpartisan	Jeanette Doran	187,273	20.87%
Total votes		897,171	100%

Poll source	Date(s) administered	Sample size	Margin of error	Robin E. Hudson	Eric Levinson	Other	Undecided
Public Policy Polling	September 11–14, 2014	1,266 (LV)	± 2.8%	18%	10%	—	72%
Public Policy Polling	August 14–17, 2014	856 (LV)	± 3.4%	19%	11%	—	71%

North Carolina Supreme Court Associate Justice (Seat 3) general election, 2014
Party	Candidate	Votes	%
Nonpartisan	Robin Hudson (incumbent)	1,283,478	52.46%
Nonpartisan	Eric Levinson	1,163,022	47.54%
Total votes		2,446,500	100%

== Supreme Court (Seat 4) ==
North Carolina Supreme Court Associate Justice (Seat 4) general election, 2014
- November 4, 2014
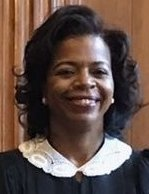

Candidate	Cheri Beasley	Mike Robinson
Popular vote	1,239,763	1,234,353
Percentage	50.11%	49.89%
Associate Justice before election
Cheri Beasley
Elected Associate Justice
Cheri Beasley

Justice Cheri Beasley ran for a full term after she was appointed to the seat by former Governor Bev Perdue in 2012.

Beasley won election to her first full term with 50.1 percent of the vote. The margin was small enough that a recount would be allowed, if Robinson requested it. He filed such a request for a recount on Nov. 17. After the recount only added a net 17 votes to Robinson's total, he conceded and Beasley was declared the winner on Nov. 25.

- Cheri Beasley, incumbent Associate Justice
- Michael L. Robinson, private practice attorney

Poll source	Date(s) administered	Sample size	Margin of error	Cheri Beasley	Mike Robinson	Other	Undecided
Public Policy Polling	September 11–14, 2014	1,266 (LV)	± 2.8%	13%	9%	—	78%

North Carolina Supreme Court Associate Justice (Seat 4) general election, 2014
Party	Candidate	Votes	%
Nonpartisan	Cheri Beasley (incumbent)	1,239,763	50.11%
Nonpartisan	Mike Robinson	1,234,353	49.89%
Total votes		2,474,116	100%

== Supreme Court (Seat 5) ==
North Carolina Supreme Court Associate Justice (Seat 5) general election, 2014
- November 4, 2014

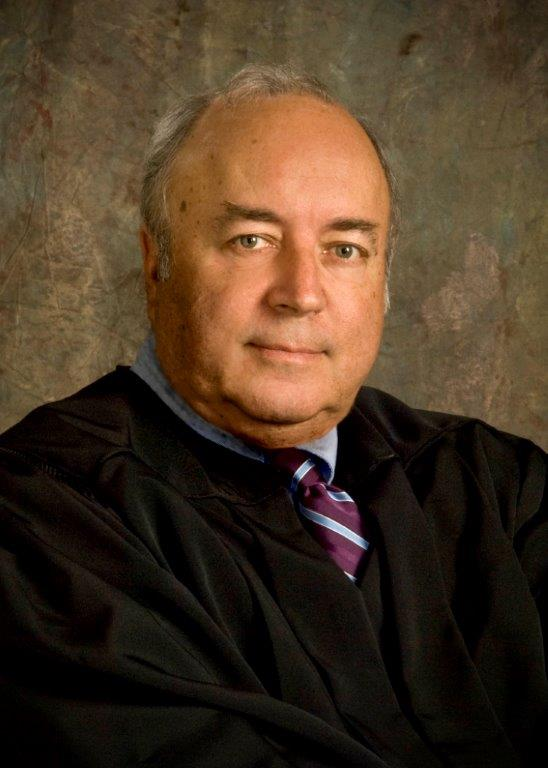
Candidate	Sam Ervin IV	Robert Hunter Jr.
Popular vote	1,324,261	1,193,492
Percentage	52.60%	47.40%
Associate Justice before election
Robert Hunter Jr.
Elected Associate Justice
Sam Ervin IV

Governor McCrory appointed Robert Hunter Jr., a judge on the North Carolina Court of Appeals, to the seat previously held by Mark Martin after his elevation to Chief Justice. Justice Hunter ran for a full eight-year term, and was challenged by his colleague on the North Carolina Court of Appeals, Sam Ervin IV, who narrowly lost a race for Associate Justice in 2012.

- Sam Ervin IV, incumbent Judge of the North Carolina Court of Appeals
- Robert Hunter Jr., incumbent Associate Justice

Poll source	Date(s) administered	Sample size	Margin of error	Sam J. Ervin IV	Robert N. Hunter, Jr.	Other	Undecided
Public Policy Polling	September 11–14, 2014	1,266 (LV)	± 2.8%	21%	13%	—	66%

North Carolina Supreme Court Associate Justice (Seat 5) general election, 2014
Party	Candidate	Votes	%
Nonpartisan	Sam Ervin IV	1,324,261	52.60%
Nonpartisan	Robert Hunter Jr. (incumbent)	1,193,492	47.40%
Total votes		2,517,753	100%

== Court of Appeals (Seat 7) ==
Judge Mark Davis ran for a full term after serving out the remainder of Judge Cheri Beasley's unexpired term. Beasley was appointed to the Supreme Court.

District Court Judge Paul A. Holcombe also ran for this seat. Paul Holcombe has been a District Court Judge for Johnston, Harnett and Lee Counties since January 2009.

Davis won his first full term by taking 58.8 percent of the vote.

Poll source	Date(s) administered	Sample size	Margin of error	Mark Davis	Paul Holcombe	Other	Undecided
Public Policy Polling	September 11–14, 2014	1,266	± 2.8%	8%	7%	—	85%

North Carolina Court of Appeals Judge (Seat 7) general election, 2014
Party	Candidate	Votes	%
Nonpartisan	Mark Davis (incumbent)	1,354,647	58.77%
Nonpartisan	Paul Holcombe	950,300	41.23%
Total votes		2,304,947	100%

== Court of Appeals (Seat 8) ==
The seat held by Judge Bob Hunter (not to be confused with his colleague on the Court, Robert Hunter Jr.) was on the ballot. Hunter announced on Aug. 14, 2013, that he would not seek re-election.

Judges Lucy Inman and Bill Southern were both candidates for the seat. Judge Inman is a special Superior Court judge and was appointed to that position in 2010 by former Governor Beverly Perdue. Prior to that, she was a trial lawyer. Judge Southern currently serves on the District Court bench for Stokes and Surry Counties. He was elected to that position in 2008 and in 2012. Prior to that, he served as an assistant district attorney in Stokes and Surry Counties.

Inman won election to her first term on the North Carolina Court of Appeals with 51.9 percent of the vote.

Poll source	Date(s) administered	Sample size	Margin of error	Lucy Inman	Bill Southern	Other	Undecided
Public Policy Polling	September 11–14, 2014	1,266	± 2.8%	9%	8%	—	83%

North Carolina Court of Appeals Judge (Seat 8) general election, 2014
Party	Candidate	Votes	%
Nonpartisan	Lucy Inman	1,227,800	51.94%
Nonpartisan	Bill Southern	1,136,268	48.06%
Total votes		2,364,068	100%

== Court of Appeals (Seat 9) ==
Judge Donna Stroud ran unopposed for re-election.

North Carolina Court of Appeals Judge (Seat 9) general election, 2014
Party	Candidate	Votes	%
Nonpartisan	Donna Stroud (incumbent)	1,801,800	100%
Total votes		1,801,800	100%

== Court of Appeals (Seat 10) ==
On July 9, 2014, Chief Judge John Martin announced his retirement, effective August 1, 2014, creating another opening to be filled by voters in the general election. Because of the date of his retirement, no primary election was held for the seat. Governor Pat McCrory appointed Judge Lisa Bell to hold the Martin seat for the remainder of the year, but she was not among the candidates who ran for a full term.

Nineteen candidates filed for the special election. They included former Court of Appeals Judge John Arrowood of Charlotte, Raleigh attorney Betsy Bunting, District Court Judge Lori G. Christian, Raleigh bankruptcy attorney Jeffrey Cook, Raleigh Deputy Industrial Commissioner and former Court of Appeals staff lawyer J. Brad Donovan, Hertford attorney Daniel Patrick Donahue, Raleigh attorney Sabra Faires, former Superior Court judge Abe Jones, New Bern attorney Ann Kirby, Deputy Industrial Commissioner Keischa Lovelace, Raleigh attorney Marty Martin, Haywood County trial attorney Hunter Murphy, Raleigh attorney Joseph "Jody" Newsome, Raleigh attorney Patricia "Tricia" Shields, Raleigh attorney Elizabeth Davenport Scott, former Court of Appeals Judge John Tyson of Cumberland County, Brunswick County District Court Judge Marion Warren, Greensboro attorney and former State Board of Elections member Chuck Winfree, and Yadkinville attorney Valerie Zachary.

Judge Tyson won his second full term on the court with 23.9 percent of the vote. Arrowood placed second with 14.4 percent. No other candidate took more than 10 percent of the vote.

North Carolina Court of Appeals Judge (Seat 10) general election, 2014
Party	Candidate	Votes	%
Nonpartisan	John Tyson	557,700	23.84%
Nonpartisan	John Arrowood	336,839	14.40%
Nonpartisan	Keischa Lovelace	226,159	9.67%
Nonpartisan	Marion Warren	143,279	6.13%
Nonpartisan	Elizabeth Davenport Scott	131,330	5.61%
Nonpartisan	Marty Martin	120,281	5.14%
Nonpartisan	Hunter Murphy	103,361	4.42%
Nonpartisan	Paul Holcombe	96,468	4.12%
Nonpartisan	Valerie Zachary	92,361	3.95%
Nonpartisan	Lori G. Christian	88,819	3.80%
Nonpartisan	Tricia Shields	79,357	3.39%
Nonpartisan	Daniel Patrick Donahue	66,168	2.83%
Nonpartisan	Abe Jones	59,712	2.55%
Nonpartisan	Chuck Winfree	52,978	2.26%
Nonpartisan	Jeffrey M. Cook	48,336	2.07%
Nonpartisan	Jody Newsome	38,544	1.65%
Nonpartisan	Betsy Bunting	36,163	1.55%
Nonpartisan	Sabra Jean Faires	31,759	1.36%
Nonpartisan	J. Brad Donovan	29,580	1.26%
Total votes		2,339,194	100%
