= Donna Stroud =

American lawyer and jurist (born 1964)

Chief Judge of the North Carolina Court of Appeals
- In office January 1, 2021 – January 1, 2024
- Appointed by: Cheri Beasley
- Preceded by: Linda McGee
- Succeeded by: Chris Dillon

Judge of the North Carolina Court of Appeals
- Incumbent
- Assumed office January 1, 2007
- Preceded by: Linda Stephens

Personal details
- Born: June 28, 1964 (age 62)
- Party: Republican
- Spouse: J. Wilson Stroud
- Children: 2
- Education: Campbell University (BA, JD)

Donna S. Stroud (born June 28, 1964) is an American lawyer and jurist who was elected to the North Carolina Court of Appeals in the 2006 election. She was reelected to the court unopposed in 2014 and reelected again in 2022.

Stroud was appointed Chief Judge of the Court of Appeals by outgoing Chief Justice Cheri Beasley and sworn in by Chief Justice Paul Martin Newby in January 2021. Newby removed her as Chief Judge and appointed Chris Dillon instead of her, without explanation, in 2024.

== Education ==
She graduated from Campbell University, summa cum laude, with a Bachelor of Arts in Government in 1985, and from the Campbell University's Norman Adrian Wiggins School of Law, with a J.D. magna cum laude in 1988. Judge Stroud was ranked first in her law school class each year of law school and upon graduation and served as the Notes and Comments Editor of the Campbell Law Review.

== Personal life ==
Since 1986, she has been married to J. Wilson Stroud. They have two sons, Aaron and Isaac.

== Career ==
After completing law school, she joined the law firm of Kirk, Gay, Kirk, Gwynn & Howell in Wendell, North Carolina as an associate. In 1995, she became a founding partner in the law firm of Gay, Stroud & Jackson, LLP.

In 2004, she was elected to the Wake County District Court (10th Judicial District), where she served until her election to the North Carolina Court of Appeals in 2006. Her Wake County District Court seat was filled by Judge Christine Walczyk.

== Electoral history ==
=== 2022 ===
North Carolina Court of Appeals (Seat 9) Republican primary election, 2022
Party	Candidate	Votes	%
Republican	Donna Stroud (incumbent)	400,119	59.28%
Republican	Beth Freshwater Smith	274,861	40.72%
Total votes		674,980	100%

North Carolina Court of Appeals (Seat 9) election, 2022
Party	Candidate	Votes	%
Republican	Donna Stroud (incumbent)	2,029,025	54.40%
Democratic	Brad Salmon	1,700,597	45.60%
Total votes		3,729,622	100%
Republican hold			

=== 2014 ===
North Carolina Court of Appeals (Stroud seat) election, 2014
Party	Candidate	Votes	%
Nonpartisan	Donna Stroud (incumbent)	1,801,800	100%
Total votes		1,801,800	100%

=== 2006 ===
North Carolina Court of Appeals (Stephens seat) primary election, 2006
Party	Candidate	Votes	%
Nonpartisan	Linda Stephens (incumbent)	221,893	44.51%
Nonpartisan	Donna Stroud	154,044	30.90%
Nonpartisan	Chris Parrish	122,537	24.58%
Total votes		498,474	100%

North Carolina Court of Appeals (Stephens seat) election, 2006
Party	Candidate	Votes	%
Nonpartisan	Donna Stroud	774,819	50.11%
Nonpartisan	Linda Stephens (incumbent)	771,353	49.89%
Total votes		1,546,172	100%

Legal offices
Preceded by Linda Stephens	Judge of the North Carolina Court of Appeals; 2007–Present	Incumbent
Preceded by Linda McGee	Chief Judge of the North Carolina Court of Appeals; 2021–2024	Succeeded by Chris Dillon
