= Christine Walczyk =

American judge

Judge of the Wake County District Court
- Incumbent
- Assumed office 2007
- Preceded by: Donna Stroud

Personal details
- Born: February 9, 1971 (age 55) Raleigh, North Carolina
- Party: Democratic
- Education: Boston College; University of North Carolina School of Law (JD)

Christine Walczyk (born February 9, 1971) an American judge who has served as a North Carolina District Court judge in Wake County since 2007. A former family-law attorney, she has served as the lead judge of the Wake County Family Court and later as a lead civil court judge. In 2026, Walczyk won the general election as the Democratic nominee for Seat 3 on the North Carolina Court of Appeals.

== Early life and education ==
Walczyk was born in 1971 in Raleigh, North Carolina. She moved to Florida as a child before returning to North Carolina in 1992. She received her bachelor's degree from Boston College and her Juris Doctor from the University of North Carolina at Chapel Hill in 1995.

== Legal career ==
Walczyk practiced business, criminal, and juvenile law with Grafstein & Walczyk, P.L.L.C. in Raleigh. In 2002, she was elected to the North Carolina Association of Women Attorneys as the chairwoman of publications, where she also supported their annual homeless drive.

== North Carolina judicial service ==
=== Wake County District Court ===
Incumbent Wake County District Court judge Alice Stubbs joined a private practice and retired from her seat in January 2006. Following the vacancy, approximately 3,700 lawyers in the judicial bar serving Wake County voted by secret ballot to select three candidates for Governor Mike Easley's consideration for a temporary appointment. Walczyk received the most votes in the election, but Easley appointed Assistant District Attorney Vince Rozier instead, one of the other three finalists.

In 2007, Governor Easley subsequently appointed Walczyk to the high-traffic courtroom position for Wake County, where she replaced judge Donna Stroud, who had been elected to the North Carolina Court of Appeals. After her appointment, Walczyk had her first election in the 2008 North Carolina judicial elections, where she ran to defend her new seat against challenger Walter Rand, who was endorsed by the Wake County Republican Party. Walcyzk won 58% to 44%. She was unopposed in her 2012, 2016, and 2020 re-election campaigns, and has served as a district court trial judge in Wake County for 19 years since her initial appointment.

=== Campaign for North Carolina Court of Appeals ===
Walczyk won Seat 3 on the North Carolina Court of Appeals in the 2026 North Carolina judicial elections. She faced fellow Democrat James Whalen, an attorney for Justice Allison Riggs during the 2024 North Carolina Supreme Court election challenges, in the primary for the seat. Whalen argued that Democratic Party judicial candidates needed to be more partisan, while Walczyk highlighted her long experience. During the primary campaign, she received the endorsement of the North Carolina Black Political Caucus. She also received endorsements from former Chief Justice Cheri Beasley and former Justice Robin Hudson. The News & Observer Editorial Board supported her in the Democratic primary over Weldon, writing that Walczyk "brings more of the relevant experience that would meet the daily demands of the appellate court." Walczyk won the primary election with 62.35% of the vote to Whalen's 37.65%.

She faced Superior Court judge Craig Collins, a Republican who won his primary, in the general election in November. She won the general election for the seat.
