= Lucy Inman =

American judge (born 1961)

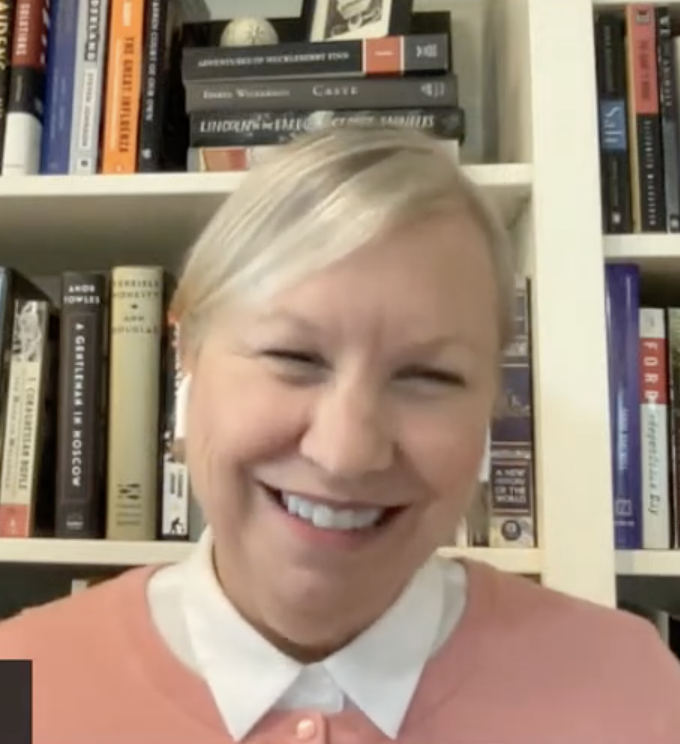

Judge of the North Carolina Court of Appeals
- In office January 1, 2015 – January 1, 2023
- Preceded by: Bob Hunter
- Succeeded by: Julee Tate Flood

Personal details
- Born: 1961 (age 64–65) Indianapolis, Indiana, U.S.
- Party: Democratic
- Parent: Lucy Daniels (mother)
- Education: North Carolina State University (BA); University of North Carolina, Chapel Hill (JD)
- Website: Campaign website

Lucy Noble Inman (born 1961) was a judge of the North Carolina Court of Appeals and formerly served as a special North Carolina Superior Court judge. She won election to the appellate court in a statewide race on November 4, 2014.

== Early life ==
Inman is the daughter of author Lucy Daniels, the granddaughter of former White House Press Secretary Jonathan W. Daniels, and the great-granddaughter of Navy Secretary Josephus Daniels. She was born in Indianapolis, Indiana, while her father was working at the Indianapolis Star. The family returned to Raleigh while she was an infant.

== Education ==
Inman earned her undergraduate degree from North Carolina State University in 1984 and worked as a newspaper reporter before attending law school at the University of North Carolina School of Law. After earning her J.D. degree in 1990, she clerked for Chief Justice James Exum at the North Carolina Supreme Court.

== Career ==
Inman was in private practice from 1992 to 2010. She and her husband, Billy Warden, lived in Los Angeles, California, from 1992 to 2000, where she practiced civil litigation, concentrating on disputes in commercial, media, and entertainment law. She was recognized for her pro bono work by the California State Bar. Upon returning to North Carolina in 2000, she shifted her practice and spent the next decade representing victims of negligence, fraud and sexual abuse.

In 2010, she was appointed to the superior court as a special judge by Governor Bev Perdue. After being appointed to the North Carolina Superior Court, she presided in hearings and jury trials in courthouses across the state. She won election to the Court of Appeals in 2014, defeating District Court Judge Bill Southern in a race to replace retiring Judge Robert C. Hunter. In the 2014 judicial election, she received endorsements from retired North Carolina Chief Justices Henry Frye, James Exum, I. Beverly Lake Jr., and Burley Mitchell.

Before becoming a judge, Inman advocated for mental health services for children and adults in North Carolina. She served on the North Carolina Governor's Advocacy Council for Persons with Disabilities and as a board member of Carolina Legal Assistance and Disability Rights North Carolina.

In January 2019, Inman announced that she was a candidate at the 2020 North Carolina judicial elections for an eight-year term as a justice of the North Carolina Supreme Court. In November, she was narrowly defeated by Republican Phil Berger Jr.

In 2022, she again ran for a seat on the North Carolina Supreme Court, but was defeated by Richard Dietz.

Inman has also served on the boards of the Lucy Daniels Foundation and North Carolinians Against Gun Violence and has chaired the judicial division of the North Carolina Association of Women Attorneys. She currently serves on the board of NC BarCARES, a non-profit entity funded by the North Carolina Bar Association that provides confidential mental health and substance abuse treatment for attorneys and judges. She is a member of the National Association of Women Judges and has served on the education committee of the Appellate Judges Education Institute.

== Personal life ==
Inman's son, William Warden, has struggled with bipolar disorder and schizophrenia all his life. In January 2020, he pled guilty in Wake County District Court to a misdemeanor charge of ethnic intimidation for threatening a local synagogue in 2018. His attorney read an apology letter from him. The court accepted his guilty plea and ordered him to comply with terms of unsupervised probation for one year, on conditions including that he remain in psychiatric treatment.

== Electoral history ==
=== 2022 ===
North Carolina Supreme Court (Seat 3) election, 2022
Party	Candidate	Votes	%
Republican	Richard Dietz	1,965,840	52.39%
Democratic	Lucy Inman	1,786,650	47.61%
Total votes		3,752,490	100%
Republican gain from Democratic			

=== 2020 ===
North Carolina State Supreme Court (Seat 2) election, 2020
Party	Candidate	Votes	%
Republican	Phil Berger Jr.	2,723,704	50.67%
Democratic	Lucy Inman	2,652,187	49.33%
Total votes		5,375,891	100%
Republican hold			

=== 2014 ===
North Carolina Court of Appeals (Hunter seat) election, 2014
Party	Candidate	Votes	%
Nonpartisan	Lucy Inman	1,227,800	51.94%
Nonpartisan	Bill Southern	1,136,268	48.06%
Total votes		2,364,068	100%

Legal offices
Preceded by Bob Hunter	Judge of the North Carolina Court of Appeals; 2015–2023	Succeeded by Julee Tate Flood
