= 2006 North Carolina judicial elections =

Justices of the North Carolina Supreme Court and judges of the North Carolina Court of Appeals are elected to eight-year terms in statewide judicial elections. In 2006, all these races were non-partisan. The Congressional, State Senate, and State House elections were also held on the same day, November 7, 2006.

The result was that all incumbents except Linda Stephens were elected (if they had been appointed) or re-elected. All the candidates supported by FairJudges.net, the first independent group to get involved in North Carolina's non-partisan judicial elections, won.

== Supreme Court (Chief Justice) ==
North Carolina Supreme Court Chief Justice general election, 2006
Party	Candidate	Votes	%
Nonpartisan	Sarah Parker (incumbent)	1,138,346	66.67%
Nonpartisan	Rusty Duke	568,980	33.33%
Total votes		1,707,326	100%

== Supreme Court (Seat 3) ==
Justice George Wainwright Jr. retired, making this an open seat. Candidates Bill Gore, Jill Cheek, and Beecher "Gus" Gray were eliminated in a May primary election.

North Carolina Supreme Court Associate Justice (Seat 3) primary election, 2006
Party	Candidate	Votes	%
Nonpartisan	Robin Hudson	152,948	29.43%
Nonpartisan	Ann Marie Calabria	133,453	25.68%
Nonpartisan	Bill Gore	115,802	22.29%
Nonpartisan	Jill Cheek	67,288	12.95%
Nonpartisan	Gus Gray	50,124	9.65%
Total votes		519,615	100%

North Carolina Supreme Court Associate Justice (Seat 3) general election, 2006
Party	Candidate	Votes	%
Nonpartisan	Robin Hudson	806,861	50.64%
Nonpartisan	Ann Marie Calabria	786,310	49.36%
Total votes		1,593,171	100%

== Supreme Court (Seat 4) ==
North Carolina Supreme Court Associate Justice (Seat 4) general election, 2006
Party	Candidate	Votes	%
Nonpartisan	Patricia Timmons-Goodson (incumbent)	953,976	58.29%
Nonpartisan	Eric Levinson	682,641	41.71%
Total votes		1,636,617	100%

== Supreme Court (Seat 5) ==
North Carolina Supreme Court Associate Justice (Seat 5) general election, 2006
Party	Candidate	Votes	%
Nonpartisan	Mark Martin (incumbent)	1,000,792	62.45%
Nonpartisan	Rachel Lea Hunter	601,676	37.55%
Total votes		1,602,468	100%

== Court of Appeals (Seat 8) ==
Candidate Bill Constangy was eliminated in a May primary election.

North Carolina Court of Appeals Judge (Seat 8) primary election, 2006
Party	Candidate	Votes	%
Nonpartisan	Bob Hunter (incumbent)	301,309	60.31%
Nonpartisan	Kris Bailey	119,150	23.85%
Nonpartisan	Bill Constangy	79,109	15.84%
Total votes		499,568	100%

North Carolina Court of Appeals Judge (Seat 8) general election, 2006
Party	Candidate	Votes	%
Nonpartisan	Bob Hunter (incumbent)	903,691	58.06%
Nonpartisan	Kris Bailey	652,733	41.94%
Total votes		1,556,424	100%

== Court of Appeals (Seat 9) ==
Candidate Chris Parrish was eliminated in a May primary election.

North Carolina Court of Appeals Judge (Seat 9) primary election, 2006
Party	Candidate	Votes	%
Nonpartisan	Linda Stephens (incumbent)	221,893	44.51%
Nonpartisan	Donna Stroud	154,044	30.90%
Nonpartisan	Chris Parrish	122,537	24.58%
Total votes		498,474	100%

North Carolina Court of Appeals Judge (Seat 9) general election, 2006
Party	Candidate	Votes	%
Nonpartisan	Donna Stroud	774,819	50.11%
Nonpartisan	Linda Stephens (incumbent)	771,353	49.89%
Total votes		1,546,172	100%

== Sources ==
- NC State Board of Elections
