= Patricia Timmons-Goodson =

American judge (born 1954)

Pat Timmons-Goodson
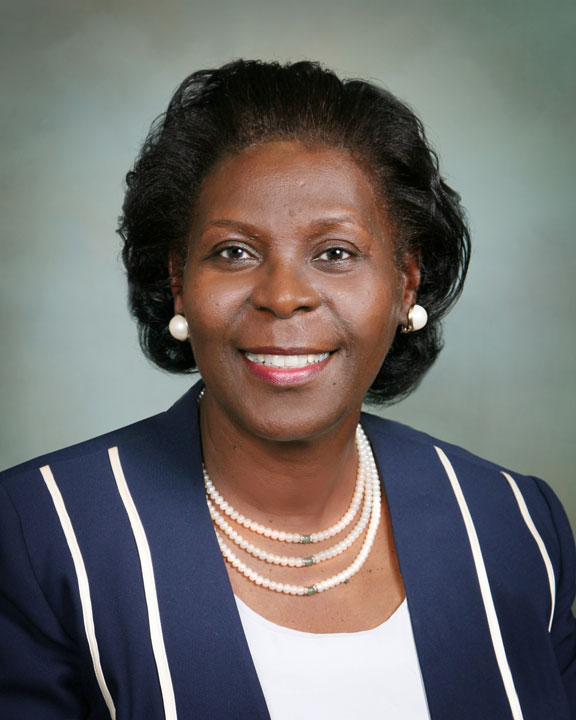

Associate Justice of the North Carolina Supreme Court
- In office February 6, 2006 – December 12, 2012
- Appointed by: Mike Easley
- Preceded by: Sarah Parker
- Succeeded by: Cheri Beasley

Judge of the North Carolina Court of Appeals
- In office February 21, 1997 – 2005
- Appointed by: Jim Hunt
- Preceded by: Clifton Johnson
- Succeeded by: Linda Stephens

Personal details
- Born: Patricia Ann Timmons; September 18, 1954 (age 71) Florence, South Carolina, U.S.
- Party: Democratic
- Spouse: Ernest Goodson
- Children: 2
- Education: University of North Carolina, Chapel Hill (AB, JD); Duke University (LLM)
- Website: Official website

Patricia Ann "Pat" Timmons-Goodson (born September 18, 1954) is an American judge and politician who served on the North Carolina Supreme Court from 2006 to 2012. She previously served on the United States Commission on Civil Rights and is a former nominee to be a federal judge for the United States District Court for the Eastern District of North Carolina. Timmons-Goodson ran for Congress in 2020.

== Early life and education ==
Timmons-Goodson was born in Florence, South Carolina, the daughter of a U.S. Army enlisted man (Sergeant First Class) and homemaker, and was raised on military bases in the United States and Europe. She attended the University of North Carolina at Chapel Hill, receiving a Bachelor of Arts degree in speech in 1976. She received a Juris Doctor in 1979 from University of North Carolina School of Law. In 2014, she received a Master of Laws degree in Judicial Studies from the Duke University School of Law.

Timmons-Goodson wrote that she was inspired to become a judge after Judge Elreta Alexander-Ralston visited her speech class in 1974. Alexander-Ralston was the first black judge Timmons-Goodson had met, and her powerful speech and elegant presentation were inspiring. In 2012, she wrote a detailed tribute to Judge Elreta Alexander-Ralston, which helped uncover her legacy for modern audiences.

== Career ==
She began her career working as a district manager for the United States Census Bureau’s Charlotte Regional Office, from 1979 to 1980. From 1981 to 1983, she served as an assistant district attorney for the 12th judicial district in Fayetteville, North Carolina. From 1983 to 1984, she was a staff attorney for Lumbee River Legal Services.

She was named a Cumberland County District Court Judge in 1984; she was subsequently elected as a Democrat to four-year terms as a district judge in 1986, 1990, and 1994. In 1997, she was appointed by Governor Jim Hunt to the North Carolina Court of Appeals. She retired from that court in late 2005. On January 19, 2006, North Carolina Governor Mike Easley appointed her to the North Carolina Supreme Court to take the place of Associate Justice Sarah Parker. Upon taking her seat in February 2006, she was the first African-American woman to serve on the Court. She was elected by the voters to remain on the Court in November 2006, defeating Judge Eric Levinson. She made it known in November 2012 that she would resign her seat before the end of the year. Court of Appeals Judge Cheri Beasley was appointed to fill her seat.

Timmons-Goodson was inducted into the North Carolina Women's Hall of Fame in 2010. In 2014, President Barack Obama appointed her to the United States Commission on Civil Rights. She formerly served as the Vice Chair of the Commission.

=== Expired nomination to district court ===
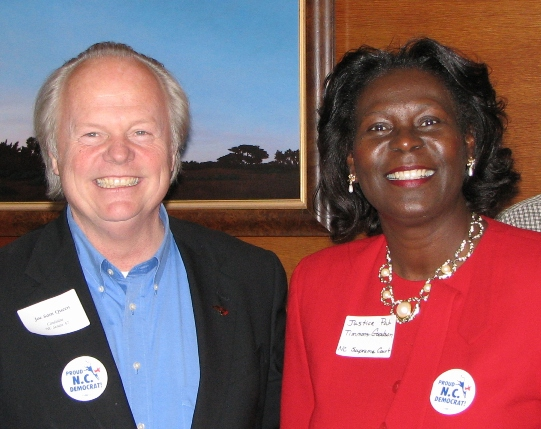
Timmons-Goodson with Senator Joe Sam Queen in 2006.

On April 28, 2016, President Obama nominated Timmons-Goodson to serve as a United States District Judge of the United States District Court for the Eastern District of North Carolina, to the seat vacated by Judge Malcolm Jones Howard, who took senior status on December 31, 2005. Her nomination expired on January 3, 2017, with the end of the 114th Congress.

=== 2020 campaign for Congress ===
In 2019, Timmons-Goodson filed to run for the United States House of Representatives seat representing North Carolina's 8th congressional district. The 8th district covered all or part of 7 counties including Cabarrus, Stanly, Montgomery, Moore, Lee, Harnett, and Cumberland. Timmons-Goodson lost to incumbent Republican Richard Hudson in the general election in November 2020, by 53% to 47%.

=== Academia ===
On July 1, 2023, Timmons-Goodson was named Dean of North Carolina Central University School of Law. She retired from that position in 2025.

== Personal life ==
Timmons-Goodson is a member of The Links.

== See also ==
- Barack Obama judicial appointment controversies
- List of African-American jurists

Legal offices
Preceded by Sarah Parker	Associate Justice of the North Carolina Supreme Court; 2006–2012	Succeeded by Cheri Beasley
