= 1996 North Carolina judicial elections =

The North Carolina judicial elections of 1996 were held statewide on November 5, 1996, to elect judges to the North Carolina Supreme Court and North Carolina Court of Appeals. A total of three seats were on the ballot, and in each case, incumbents who had been appointed by Gov. Jim Hunt (running for re-election that same day) were elected to terms in their own right.

== Supreme Court ==
=== Chief Justice seat ===
1996 North Carolina Supreme Court election – Chief Justice
| Party | Candidate | Votes | % |
|---|---|---|---|
| Democratic | Burley Mitchell (incumbent) | 1,221,232 | 51.29% |
| Republican | Raymond A. Warren | 1,159,678 | 48.71% |
| Total votes | | 2,380,910 | 100% |
| Democratic hold | | | |

=== Parker seat ===
1996 North Carolina Supreme Court election – Associate Justice
| Party | Candidate | Votes | % |
|---|---|---|---|
| Democratic | Sarah Parker (incumbent) | 1,323,327 | 55.69% |
| Republican | Carl L. Tilghman | 1,052,786 | 44.31% |
| Total votes | | 2,376,113 | 100% |
| Democratic hold | | | |

== Court of Appeals ==
1996 North Carolina Court of Appeals election – Court of Appeals
| Party | Candidate | Votes | % |
|---|---|---|---|
| Democratic | Linda McGee (incumbent) | 1,221,653 | 52.04% |
| Republican | Betty J. Pearce | 1,126,013 | 47.96% |
| Total votes | | 2,347,666 | 100% |
| Democratic hold | | | |
