= George L. Wainwright Jr. =

American judge

Associate Justice of the North Carolina Supreme Court
- In office January 1, 1999 – January 1, 2007
- Succeeded by: Robin E. Hudson

Personal details
- Born: December 10, 1943 (age 81)
- Political party: Republican

George L. Wainwright Jr. (born December 10, 1943) is a former Associate Justice of the North Carolina Supreme Court.

Born in Wilson County, North Carolina, Wainwright earned a degree in political science as a Morehead Scholar at the University of North Carolina at Chapel Hill before working in agribusiness and real estate in Wilson, North Carolina for over 15 years. He earned his law degree from Wake Forest University in 1984. Wainwright is also a veteran of the United States Coast Guard Reserve.

From 1986 to 1990, Wainwright practiced law in Morehead City and in Beaufort, North Carolina, at the firm Wheatly, Wheatly, Nobles & Weeks. In 1991, Governor Jim Martin named Wainwright to a North Carolina District Court judgeship. He became a North Carolina Superior Court judge in 1994, and was finally elected to the state Supreme Court in 1998. He chose not to run for re-election in 2006. Governor Pat McCrory appointed Wainwright to the State Ethics Commission in 2014, and later named him chairman of the commission.
