= Eric L. Levinson =

American jurist and lawyer

Eric L. Levinson is an American jurist, lawyer, and diplomat. He served on the North Carolina Court of Appeals and the North Carolina Superior Court. He also was the Justice Attache to the U.S. Embassy in Baghdad.

Levinson was a North Carolina prosecutor and an N.C. District and Family Court Judge before his election to the North Carolina Court of Appeals in 2002. In 2007, Levinson resigned from the Court of Appeals, accepting a Bush administration appointment as the Justice Attache to the U.S. Embassy in Baghdad, Iraq with the United States Department of Justice. In 2009, North Carolina Governor. Beverly Perdue appointed Levinson to the North Carolina Superior Court.

In 2006 and 2014, he unsuccessfully sought a seat on the Supreme Court of North Carolina.

== Early life ==
Levinson is a native North Carolinian. He received a BBA in finance, cum laude, from the University of Georgia, where he was an honors program student. While an undergraduate, he a completed the Institute on Comparative Political and Economic Systems through the Fund for American Studies in Washington, D.C. and Georgetown University, and completed an overseas studies program in International Finance hosted by the University of London.

He received a Juris Doctor degree from the University of North Carolina at Chapel Hill School of Law. While at UNC, he was an Honors Program student and was president of the Student Bar Association.

== Career ==
After law school, Levinson joined the District Attorney's Office in Cabarrus and Rowan Counties, North Carolina. as a felony prosecutor. He was elected to the judiciary in 1996 as a North Carolina District and Family Court Judge. In this role, he implemented best-practices in the criminal and child support enforcement courts and became an N.C. Certified Juvenile Court Judge.

In 2002, Levinson was elected statewide as one of fifteen members of the North Carolina Court of Appeals in Raleigh, where he served as an Associate Judge. He was the court's youngest member and authored hundreds of legal opinions in disputes and lawsuits. He also completed the required training to be a certified Superior Court mediator in 2004.

In 2007, Levinson was appointed by the Bush administration as the Justice Attache to Iraq for the U.S. Department of Justice. As Justice Attache, Levinson managed the U.S. government's diplomatic relationship with the Iraqi judiciary and its Chief Justice, Medhat al Mahmoud, and advanced the establishment of Major Crimes Courts where terrorists were prosecuted. Although stationed at the U.S. Embassy inside the International Zone, Levinson traveled to other population centers and provinces throughout Iraq, meeting with military and civilian leaders who were responsible for the administration of the rule of law in Iraq.

In 2008, he worked in Kabul, Afghanistan as a Rule of Law and Courts Advisor. In this role, he collaborated with members of the Supreme Court of Afghanistan and helped draft and advance guidelines and procedures for establishing and resourcing commercial courts in Afghanistan to adjudicate business, contract, and related civil conflicts.

Upon his return to the U.S. in early 2009, a bipartisan group of Republican and Democratic lawmakers endorsed his appointment to the North Carolina Superior Court. This position involved holding court in counties in western, central, and eastern North Carolina.

Levinson taught as an adjunct instructor at the University of North Carolina at Chapel Hill School of Government, the Charlotte School of Law, and the University of North Carolina at Charlotte, He serves on the Administration of Justice Committee of the North Carolina Bar Association.

== Electoral history ==
In 2006, Levinson unsuccessfully sought a seat on the North Carolina Supreme Court.

In 2014, Levinson unsuccessfully sought a seat as an associate justice of the North Carolina Supreme Court. He finished second in a three-way May 6 primary election with 328,062 votes (36.57%), behind first-place finisher Robin Hudson (the incumbent), who received 381,836 votes (42.56%). Jeanette Doran finished third with 187,273 votes (20.87%). Hudson and Levinson advanced to the general election, which was held on November 4, 2014 Hudson defeated Levinson by receiving 1,283,478 votes (52.46%) to Levinson's 1,163,022 votes (47.54%).

== Personal life ==
In 2006, Levinson was chosen as a Friday Fellow in 2006 and completed a two-year leadership and human relations program sponsored by the Wildacres Leadership Institute.

Levinson serves as a member of the board of advisors for Serving Alto Cayma and the Wildacres Leadership Institute. He was formerly a board member of Substance Abuse Prevention Services; Hands on Charlotte; and the Alumni Council for the Fund for American Studies. In 2003, he received the Fund for American Studies' Outstanding Young Alumnus Award.

He is a member of the Charlotte Rotary and was previously involved in the Charlotte Jaycees.
