= Linda M. McGee =

American Court of Appeals judge (born 1949)

Chief Judge of the North Carolina Court of Appeals
- In office August 1, 2014 – December 31, 2020
- Preceded by: John Martin
- Succeeded by: Donna Stroud

Associate Judge of the North Carolina Court of Appeals
- In office 1995 – December 31, 2020
- Succeeded by: April C. Wood

Personal details
- Born: September 20, 1949 (age 75); Marion, North Carolina, U.S.
- Political party: Democratic
- Education: University of North Carolina School of Law (JD)

Linda M. McGee (born September 20, 1949) is an American judge, who retired as the Chief Judge of the North Carolina Court of Appeals at the end of 2020. McGee retired as the "longest serving Court of Appeals judge in state history."

Born in Marion, North Carolina, McGee earned her undergraduate degree from the University of North Carolina at Chapel Hill in 1971 and her Juris Doctor (J.D.) degree from UNC-Chapel Hill two years later. After law school, she worked as executive director of the North Carolina Academy of Trial Lawyers from 1973 until 1978, when she entered private practice in Boone, North Carolina.

McGee was appointed to the Court of Appeals in 1995 by Governor Jim Hunt, and elected to eight-year terms in 1996 and 2004. In the 2012 election, McGee was re-elected for her final term, and was endorsed for re-election by the (Raleigh) News and Observer, which described her as an "energetic, experienced judge" and added, "Outside the courtroom, McGee is an effective advocate for the judicial system." She was appointed Chief Judge of the Court of Appeals by Supreme Court Chief Justice Sarah Parker, effective August 1, 2014.

She is married and has two children.
