= Michael R. Morgan =

American judge

Mike Morgan
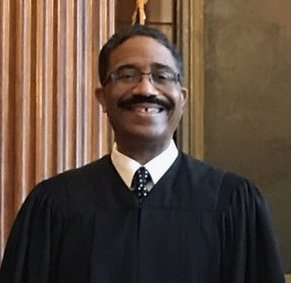

Associate Justice of the North Carolina Supreme Court
- In office January 1, 2017 – September 4, 2023
- Preceded by: Robert H. Edmunds Jr.
- Succeeded by: Allison Riggs

Personal details
- Born: Michael Rivers Morgan; October 22, 1955 (age 70) New Bern, North Carolina, U.S.
- Party: Democratic
- Education: Duke University (BA); North Carolina Central University (JD)

Michael Rivers Morgan (born October 22, 1955) is an American jurist from the state of North Carolina. Morgan served for more than six years as an associate justice of the North Carolina Supreme Court. Previously, he served as a judge on the 3rd division of North Carolina Superior Court for Judicial Circuit 10B, which covers Wake County.

In the 2016 election, Judge Morgan defeated 16-year incumbent Supreme Court Justice Robert H. Edmunds Jr., winning 54.45% of the votes and a majority of the state's counties.

Morgan is an alumnus of Duke University (A.B. degree, 1976) and North Carolina Central University (J.D. degree, 1979).

On May 18, 2023, Morgan announced that he would not be a candidate for reelection. He later announced on August 24, 2023 that he would be resigning from the court during the week of September 4, 2023. On September 12, 2023, Morgan announced he would seek the Democratic nomination for Governor of North Carolina in 2024. Morgan placed second in the Democratic primary with 14.31% of the vote.

== See also ==
- List of African-American jurists

Legal offices
Preceded by Robert H. Edmunds Jr.	Associate Justice of the North Carolina Supreme Court; 2017–2023	Succeeded by Allison Riggs
