= Linda Stephens =

American lawyer

Judge of the North Carolina Court of Appeals
- In office January 1, 2007 – December 31, 2016
- Appointed by: Mike Easley
- Preceded by: Robin Hudson
- Succeeded by: Phil Berger Jr.
- In office January 19, 2006 – January 1, 2007
- Appointed by: Mike Easley
- Preceded by: Patricia Timmons-Goodson
- Succeeded by: Donna Stroud

Personal details
- Party: Democratic
- Education: University of South Carolina; University of North Carolina at Chapel Hill (JD)

Linda Stephens is an American lawyer who formerly served as an associate judge on the North Carolina Court of Appeals. She was first appointed to the Court of Appeals by Gov. Mike Easley (D-NC) in January 2006 and lost her seat in the general election of November 2006. Gov. Easley then reappointed her to the Court of Appeals in January 2007 to fill the seat vacated by the election of Robin Hudson to the NC Supreme Court. Judge Stephens won a full term in a non-partisan election on November 4, 2008. Her opponent for the seat was Dan Barrett, an attorney and author from Davie County.

Linda Stephens' 2008 candidacy had the endorsement of the NC National Organization for Women, EqualityNC, the Muslim-American PAC, The Black Political Caucus of Charlotte-Mecklenburg, North Carolina Association of Defense Attorneys, NC Academy of Trial Lawyers, and NC Association of Women Attorneys.

Stephens was defeated in her bid for re-election in 2016 by Phil Berger Jr. She ran as a Democrat.

Stephens is a magna cum laude graduate of the University of South Carolina and received her J.D. degree from the University of North Carolina at Chapel Hill.

== Electoral history ==
=== 2016 ===
North Carolina State Court of Appeals (Stephens Seat) election, 2016
Party	Candidate	Votes	%
Republican	Phil Berger Jr.	2,233,730	50.25%
Democratic	Linda Stephens (incumbent)	2,211,631	49.75%
Total votes		4,445,361	100%
Republican gain from Democratic			

=== 2008 ===
North Carolina Court of Appeals (Stephens seat) election, 2008
Party	Candidate	Votes	%
Nonpartisan	Linda Stephens (incumbent)	1,729,139	58.76%
Nonpartisan	Dan Barrett	1,213,746	41.24%
Total votes		2,942,885	100%

=== 2006 ===
North Carolina Court of Appeals (Stephens seat) primary election, 2006
Party	Candidate	Votes	%
Nonpartisan	Linda Stephens (incumbent)	221,893	44.51%
Nonpartisan	Donna Stroud	154,044	30.90%
Nonpartisan	Chris Parrish	122,537	24.58%
Total votes		498,474	100%

North Carolina Court of Appeals (Stephens seat) election, 2006
Party	Candidate	Votes	%
Nonpartisan	Donna Stroud	774,819	50.11%
Nonpartisan	Linda Stephens (incumbent)	771,353	49.89%
Total votes		1,546,172	100%

Legal offices
Preceded by Patricia Timmons-Goodson	Judge of the North Carolina Court of Appeals; 2006–2007	Succeeded by Donna Stroud
Preceded by Robin Hudson	Judge of the North Carolina Court of Appeals; 2007–2017	Succeeded by Phil Berger Jr.
