= Trey Allen =

American judge (born 1974)

Associate Justice of the North Carolina Supreme Court
- Incumbent
- Assumed office January 1, 2023
- Preceded by: Sam J. Ervin IV

Personal details
- Born: Curtis Hudson Allen III; November 20, 1974 (age 51)
- Education: University of North Carolina, Pembroke (BA); University of North Carolina, Chapel Hill (JD)

Military service
- Allegiance: United States
- Branch/service: United States Marine Corps
- Years of service: 2000–2005
- Unit: United States Marine Corps Judge Advocate Division
- Battles/wars: Operation Iraqi Freedom

Curtis Hudson "Trey" Allen III (born November 20, 1974) is an American lawyer who serves as an associate justice of the North Carolina Supreme Court. He was elected in November 2022.

== Early life and education ==
Allen was born in Lumberton, North Carolina. He earned a Bachelor of Arts degree in political science from the University of North Carolina at Pembroke in 1997 and a Juris Doctor from the University of North Carolina School of Law in 2000.

== Career ==
From 2000 to 2005, Allen served in the United States Marine Corps. During his service, Allen was deployed to Iraq and was a member of the United States Marine Corps Judge Advocate Division. Allen later served as a law clerk for Paul Martin Newby and worked as an attorney at Tharrington Smith LLP in Raleigh, North Carolina. He was the Albert and Gladys Hall Coates Distinguished Term associate Professor of Public Law and Government at the University of North Carolina at Chapel Hill and served as general counsel to the North Carolina Administrative Office of the Courts. Allen was elected to the North Carolina Supreme Court in November 2022, unseating incumbent Democrat Sam J. Ervin IV.

Legal offices
Preceded by Sam J. Ervin IV	Associate Justice of the North Carolina Supreme Court; 2023–present	Incumbent
