= Robin E. Hudson =

American judge (born 1952)

Robin Hudson

Associate Justice of the North Carolina Supreme Court
- In office January 1, 2007 – January 1, 2023
- Preceded by: George Wainwright
- Succeeded by: Richard Dietz

Judge of the North Carolina Court of Appeals
- In office January 2, 2001 – December 31, 2006
- Preceded by: John Lewis Jr.
- Succeeded by: Linda Stephens

Personal details
- Born: February 20, 1952 (age 74) DeKalb County, Georgia, U.S.
- Party: Democratic
- Education: Yale University (BA); University of North Carolina, Chapel Hill (JD)

Robin Elizabeth Hudson (born February 20, 1952) is an American jurist who served as an associate justice of the North Carolina Supreme Court.

== Early life and education ==
Born in DeKalb County, Georgia, after studying philosophy and psychology at Yale University, Hudson earned a J.D. degree from the University of North Carolina at Chapel Hill in 1976.

== Career ==
Except for three years as a state appellate defender, Hudson worked in private practice in Raleigh and Durham, North Carolina until 2000, when she was elected to the North Carolina Court of Appeals—the first woman to be elected to an appellate court in North Carolina without being appointed first. She is married and has two children, Emily and Charles.

Hudson was elected to the North Carolina Supreme Court seat of retiring Justice George Wainwright in November 2006. She took office in January 2007. Hudson was re-elected to the Court in November 2014. She chose not to run for another term in 2022, as she would have reached the state's mandatory retirement age about 13 months into that term.

In 2009, Hudson became president of the Women's Forum of North Carolina.

Hudson wrote the Supreme Court's 2022 opinion striking down the state legislature's congressional and legislative districts as excessively partisan gerrymanders.

== Electoral history ==
=== 2014 ===
North Carolina Supreme Court Associate Justice (Hudson seat) primary election, 2014
Party	Candidate	Votes	%
Nonpartisan	Robin Hudson (incumbent)	381,836	42.56%
Nonpartisan	Eric Levinson	328,062	36.57%
Nonpartisan	Jeanette Doran	187,273	20.87%
Total votes		897,171	100%

North Carolina Supreme Court Associate Justice (Hudson seat) general election, 2014
Party	Candidate	Votes	%
Nonpartisan	Robin Hudson (incumbent)	1,283,478	52.46%
Nonpartisan	Eric Levinson	1,163,022	47.54%
Total votes		2,446,500	100%

=== 2006 ===
North Carolina Supreme Court Associate Justice (Wainwright seat) election, 2006
Party	Candidate	Votes	%
Nonpartisan	Robin Hudson	806,861	50.64%
Nonpartisan	Ann Marie Calabria	786,310	49.36%
Total votes		1,593,171	100%

=== 2000 ===
North Carolina Court of Appeals (Lewis seat) election, 2000
Party	Candidate	Votes	%
Democratic	Robin Hudson	1,396,957	51.46%
Republican	Paul Stam	1,317,677	48.54%
Total votes		2,714,634	100%

Legal offices
Preceded by George Wainwright	Associate Justice of the North Carolina Supreme Court; 2007–2023	Succeeded by Richard Dietz
