= John C. Martin (judge) =

American attorney (born 1943)

Chief Judge of the North Carolina Court of Appeals
- In office 2004 – August 1, 2014
- Preceded by: Sidney S. Eagles Jr.
- Succeeded by: Linda M. McGee

Judge of the North Carolina Court of Appeals
- In office 1993 – August 1, 2014
- Succeeded by: Lisa Bell

Personal details
- Born: John Charles Martin; November 9, 1943 Durham, North Carolina, U.S.
- Died: April 9, 2024 (aged 80) Raleigh, North Carolina, U.S.
- Spouse: Margaret Rand Martin
- Children: 3 biological, 2 stepchildren
- Education: Wake Forest University; Wake Forest University School of Law
- Profession: Attorney, judge
- Awards: Order of the Long Leaf Pine

Military service
- Allegiance: United States
- Branch/service: Military Police Corps
- Years of service: 1967–1969
- Rank: Lieutenant

John Charles Martin (November 9, 1943 - April 9, 2024) was an American attorney, who retired as a Judge (and Chief Judge) of the North Carolina Court of Appeals on August 1, 2014.

Born in Durham, North Carolina, Martin earned an undergraduate degree from Wake Forest University in 1965 and his law degree from Wake Forest University School of Law in 1967. He served in the United States Army Military Police as a lieutenant from 1967 to 1969. He then entered private law practice.

Martin served one term on the city council of Durham before becoming a North Carolina Superior Court judge in 1977 by appointment of Governor Jim Hunt. He was elected to the Court of Appeals in 1984, where he served from 1985 to 1988 and from 1993 until 2014. He became chief judge of the court in 2004. He also served as chairman of the state's Judicial Standards Commission from 2001 through 2014. Judge Martin received the North Carolina Bar Association's highest honor, the John J. Parker Memorial Award, in 2013. He was elected president of the Council of Chief Judges of the State Courts of Appeal for the year 2013-2014.

Upon his retirement, Martin was awarded the Order of the Long Leaf Pine by Governor Pat McCrory.

Judge Martin was married to Margaret Rand Martin and had three children, two stepchildren, and nine grandchildren. He died on April 9, 2024.

== Notes ==
Preceded by Sidney S. Eagles, Jr.	Chief Judge of the North Carolina Court of Appeals; 2004 - 2014	Succeeded by Linda M. McGee
