= Sidney S. Eagles Jr. =

American judge

Chief Judge of the North Carolina Court of Appeals
- In office 1998 – January 31, 2004
- Preceded by: S. Gerald Arnold
- Succeeded by: John C. Martin

Judge of the North Carolina Court of Appeals
- In office 1983 – January 31, 2004
- Succeeded by: Alan Thornburg

Personal details
- Education: Wake Forest University; Wake Forest University School of Law
- Occupation: Judge

Military service
- Allegiance: United States
- Branch/service: United States Air Force (Air Force Reserve Command)
- Rank: Colonel
- Awards: Legion of Merit

Sidney S. "Sid" Eagles Jr. served as a judge of the North Carolina Court of Appeals from 1983 until January 2004. At the time of his retirement, Eagles was serving as Chief Judge of that court. Before his judicial service, Eagles worked as counsel to the Speaker of the North Carolina House of Representatives and as a special deputy Attorney General.

A graduate of Wake Forest University and the Wake Forest University School of Law, Judge Eagles has served as a member of the Board of Visitors for the Wake Forest University School of Law and as Chairperson of the Board of Trustees of Barton College. He is a retired Colonel in the U.S. Air Force Reserve, where he was awarded the Legion of Merit upon his retirement.. (List)

Preceded by S. Gerald Arnold	Chief Judge of the North Carolina Court of Appeals; 1998 - 2004	Succeeded by John Martin
