= Courts of North Carolina =

Courts of North Carolina include:

State courts of North Carolina

- North Carolina Supreme Court
  - North Carolina Court of Appeals
    - North Carolina Superior Court (48 districts)
    - North Carolina District Courts (41 districts)

Federal courts located in North Carolina

- United States District Court for the Eastern District of North Carolina
- United States District Court for the Middle District of North Carolina
- United States District Court for the Western District of North Carolina

Former federal courts of North Carolina

- United States District Court for the District of North Carolina (extinct, subdivided)
- United States District Court for the District of Edenton (1794–1797; extinct, reorganized)
- United States District Court for the District of New Bern (1794–1797; extinct, reorganized)
- United States District Court for the District of Wilmington (1794–1797; extinct, reorganized)
- United States District Court for the District of Albemarle (1801–1872; extinct, reorganized)
- United States District Court for the District of Cape Fear (1801–1872; extinct, reorganized)
- United States District Court for the District of Pamptico (1801–1872; extinct, reorganized)
