= Cheri Beasley =

American judge (born 1966)

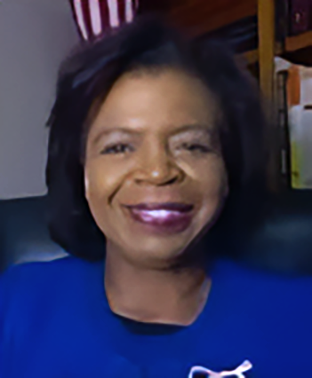
- Beasley in 2020

29th Chief Justice of the North Carolina Supreme Court
- In office March 1, 2019 – December 31, 2020
- Appointed by: Roy Cooper
- Preceded by: Mark Martin
- Succeeded by: Paul Martin Newby

Associate Justice of the North Carolina Supreme Court
- In office December 12, 2012 – March 1, 2019
- Appointed by: Bev Perdue
- Preceded by: Patricia Timmons-Goodson
- Succeeded by: Mark A. Davis

Judge of the North Carolina Court of Appeals
- In office January 1, 2009 – December 12, 2012
- Preceded by: Douglas McCullough
- Succeeded by: Mark A. Davis

Personal details
- Born: Cheri Lynn Beasley; February 14, 1966 (age 60) Chicago, Illinois, U.S.
- Party: Democratic
- Spouse: Curtis Owens
- Children: 2
- Education: Rutgers University, New Brunswick (BA); University of Tennessee (JD); Duke University (LLM)
- Website: Official website

Cheri Lynn Beasley (born February 14, 1966) is an American attorney and jurist who served as the chief justice of the North Carolina Supreme Court from 2019 to 2020 as well as an associate justice from 2012 to 2019. She was defeated by Paul Martin Newby in 2020. Beasley previously served on the North Carolina Court of Appeals and as a district court judge in Cumberland County, North Carolina.

Beasley was the Democratic nominee in the 2022 United States Senate election in North Carolina. She lost to Republican nominee Ted Budd.

== Education ==
Beasley earned a Bachelor of Arts in political science and economics at Douglass College of Rutgers University–New Brunswick in 1988 and a Juris Doctor from the University of Tennessee College of Law in 1991. She also earned a Master of Laws from Duke University School of Law in 2018.

== Judicial career ==
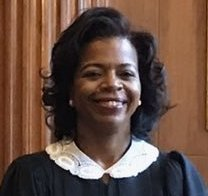
Beasley in 2017

Beasley spent her first years after law school as an assistant public defender in Cumberland County, North Carolina. She was first appointed to the bench as a state district court judge by Governor Jim Hunt in 1999, and then elected in a 2002 election. She was reelected without opposition in 2006. She served as a Judge in District 12 (Cumberland County) until her election to the Court of Appeals.

=== Appellate court ===
In 2008, Beasley was elected to the North Carolina Court of Appeals, defeating incumbent Douglas McCullough by a 15-point margin. In that election, she became the first Black woman to win election to statewide office in North Carolina without first being appointed by a governor. In December 2012, after four years on the Court of Appeals, Beasley was appointed to the North Carolina Supreme Court by Governor Beverly Perdue, filling the vacancy created by Justice Patricia Timmons-Goodson's retirement. She was elected to a full eight-year term in 2014.

On February 12, 2019, Governor Roy Cooper appointed Beasley to the position of chief justice after Mark Martin retired, making her the first African-American woman to serve as chief justice of the North Carolina Supreme Court.

Beasley ran for a full term as chief justice in the 2020 election, losing by 401 votes to Associate Justice Paul Martin Newby. After leaving office, she joined McGuireWoods as a partner in the law firm's Raleigh office.

== 2022 U.S. Senate campaign ==
In February 2021, various media outlets reported that Beasley was considering running in the 2022 U.S. Senate election in North Carolina. The News & Observer reported in March 2021 that Beasley had decided to enter the race for the Senate seat being vacated by retiring Senator Richard Burr. She launched her campaign on April 27, 2021, and on May 17, she won the Democratic primary election. She lost the general election on November 8 to Republican nominee Ted Budd. Beasley became the second black nominee who lost a seat in the U.S. Senate in North Carolina history since Harvey Gantt who was defeated on the other senate seat by Jesse Helms twice in 1990 and 1996.

== Personal life ==
Beasley is married to Curtis Owens, a scientist. They have twin sons. In 2014, Beasley was the featured speaker at Saint Augustine's University's Lyceum Leadership Speaker Series. She was the commencement speaker to the 2018 class of University of Tennessee College of Law. Beasley was also the keynote speaker at Samford University’s Cumberland School of Law Black Law Students Association's 24th Annual Thurgood Marshall Symposium. In 2019, she was the undergraduate commencement speaker for nearly 900 graduates at Fayettesville State University, for the 133rd graduate commencement of North Carolina Central University, and the commencement speaker for Elon University's School of Law.

== Electoral history ==
North Carolina Court of Appeals seat election, 2008
Party	Candidate	Votes	%
Nonpartisan	Cheri Beasley	1,706,132	57.42%
Nonpartisan	Doug McCullough (incumbent)	1,265,378	42.58%
Total votes		2,971,510	100.0

North Carolina State Supreme Court seat election, 2014
Party	Candidate	Votes	%
Nonpartisan	Cheri Beasley (incumbent)	1,239,763	50.11%
Nonpartisan	Mike Robinson	1,234,353	49.89%
Total votes		2,474,116	100.0

North Carolina State Supreme Court Chief Justice seat election, 2020
Party	Candidate	Votes	%
Republican	Paul Martin Newby	2,695,951	50.004
Democratic	Cheri Beasley (incumbent)	2,695,550	49.996
Total votes		5,391,501	100.0

== See also ==
- Joe Biden Supreme Court candidates
- List of African-American jurists
- List of female state supreme court justices
- List of justices of the North Carolina Supreme Court
- Black women in American politics
- List of African-American United States Senate candidates

Legal offices
Preceded by Patricia Timmons-Goodson	Associate Justice of the North Carolina Supreme Court; 2012–2019	Succeeded by Mark A. Davis
Preceded by Mark Martin	Chief Justice of the North Carolina Supreme Court; 2019–2020	Succeeded by Paul Newby
Party political offices
Preceded by Deborah K. Ross	Democratic nominee for U.S. Senator from North Carolina (Class 3); 2022	Most recent
