= Phil Berger Jr. =

American judge (born 1972)

Phil Berger

Associate Justice of the North Carolina Supreme Court
- Incumbent
- Assumed office January 1, 2021
- Preceded by: Paul Martin Newby

Judge of the North Carolina Court of Appeals
- In office January 1, 2017 – December 31, 2020
- Preceded by: Linda Stephens
- Succeeded by: Darren Jackson

Personal details
- Born: March 26, 1972 (age 54)
- Party: Republican
- Relatives: Phil Berger (father)
- Education: University of North Carolina, Wilmington (BA); Wake Forest University (JD)

Philip Berger Jr. (born March 26, 1972) is an American lawyer who has served as an associate justice of the North Carolina Supreme Court since 2021.

Berger was elected to a seat on the North Carolina Court of Appeals in 2016, defeating incumbent Judge Linda Stephens. In the 2020 judicial elections, while still serving on that court, he was elected as a Republican to an eight-year term to begin January 1, 2021, as a justice of the North Carolina Supreme Court, taking the seat formerly held by Justice Paul Martin Newby and defeating a fellow Court of Appeals Judge Lucy Inman.

Berger's father is longtime North Carolina Senate President pro tempore Phil Berger. Berger formerly served as district attorney in Rockingham County, North Carolina, and as an administrative law judge. He was an unsuccessful candidate for Congress in 2014.

On September 3, 2026, Berger announced that he would not seek another term as associate justice in 2028.

== Ethical controversies ==
Berger's political connections have brought scrutiny to his family relationships and ethics. For example, his campaign for the State Supreme Court was alleged to have violated state election laws preventing the intermixing of candidate and PAC funds. That case was dropped with Berger Jr. demanding an apology for misinformation.

Berger Jr. faced calls to recuse himself from a case involving a North Carolina voter ID law in which his father was a named-defendant. Berger Jr. ultimately did not recuse himself in that case, writing a dissent from the majority's holding against his father.

Legal offices
Preceded by Paul Martin Newby	Associate Justice of the North Carolina Supreme Court; 2021–present	Incumbent
