= Paul Martin Newby =

American judge (born 1955)

Paul Newby

Chief Justice of the North Carolina Supreme Court
- Incumbent
- Assumed office January 1, 2021
- Preceded by: Cheri Beasley

Associate Justice of the North Carolina Supreme Court
- In office November 29, 2004 – December 31, 2020
- Preceded by: Robert F. Orr
- Succeeded by: Phil Berger Jr.

Personal details
- Born: May 5, 1955 (age 71) Asheboro, North Carolina, U.S.
- Party: Republican
- Education: Duke University (BA); University of North Carolina, Chapel Hill (JD)

Paul Martin Newby (born May 5, 1955) is an American judge, who was first elected to a seat on the North Carolina Supreme Court in 2004. He was elected chief justice in 2020 defeating incumbent Cheri Beasley.

== Early life, education and family ==
Newby was born in Asheboro, North Carolina, on May 5, 1955, to Samuel O. Newby and Ruth Parks Newby. He graduated from Ragsdale High School in Jamestown, North Carolina. He is an Eagle Scout and former Scoutmaster. A resident of Raleigh, North Carolina, Newby earned a bachelor's degree in Public Policy Studies from Duke University in 1977 and a Juris Doctor degree from the University of North Carolina at Chapel Hill in 1980.

An evangelical Christian, Newby credits Josh McDowell's book More Than a Carpenter as reinforcing his faith in law school. In 1983, he married Toler Macon Tucker, whom he met in law school and whose family had accumulated a fortune from banking and furniture stores. Newby and his wife have adopted four children.

In September 1994, the Newbys attempted to adopt their fourth child, but were sued for custody by the child's biological father. After being sued, the Newbys returned the child to its biological mother, who was later ordered to return the child to its father. After the incident the couple founded two adoption agencies, including Amazing Grace Adoptions, and successfully adopted their fourth child.

== Career ==
After four years in private practice in Kannapolis, a year as a counsel to a real estate developer, vice president and general counsel of Cannon Mills Realty and Development Corporation, Newby was appointed as an assistant United States attorney for the Eastern District of North Carolina in 1985, a post he held for almost twenty years. He is an adjunct professor at the Campbell University's Norman Adrian Wiggins School of Law, and the co-author of a book on the North Carolina Constitution.

=== North Carolina Supreme Court ===
In 2004, following the resignation of Justice Robert F. Orr, Newby was one of eight candidates who filed in a special election to fill the vacant seat. He won the race with 23% of the vote for an eight-year term on the court in the statewide judicial elections. In the officially non-partisan race, Newby was endorsed by the North Carolina Republican Party. The North Carolina Democratic Party refused to endorse any candidate in the race.

In November 2012, he won re-election to a second eight-year term, defeating Sam J. Ervin IV by a four percent margin.

On November 3, 2020, Newby was elected as the chief justice, for an eight-year term beginning Jan. 1, 2021. On January 1, 2021, he was sworn in as the 30th Chief Justice.

In 2023, Newby attended a legal conference at the Royal Hawaiian Resort in Honolulu, Hawaii, for which Newby's travel was funded by the Antonin Scalia Law School at George Mason University, but Newby did not report the trip on his annual judicial ethics disclosure form.

Between 2008 and 2025, Newby made four donations to political candidates while serving as a judge in North Carolina, despite the state's rules on judicial conduct barring state judges from personal financial contributions to candidates for elected office.

==== Notable cases ====
In 2023, Newby authored a majority opinion for the court that held that partisan gerrymandering was legal in North Carolina, overturning a decision by the North Carolina Supreme Court from the previous year that had outlawed partisan gerrymandering in the state.

== Awards and associations ==
- James Iredell Award, Phi Alpha Delta
- Scoutmaster, emeritus of Troop 11, Boy Scouts of America

== Electoral history ==
North Carolina Supreme Court Associate Justice (Seat 2) general election, 2004
Party	Candidate	Votes	%
Nonpartisan	Paul Martin Newby	582,684	22.59%
Nonpartisan	James Andrew Wynn	508,416	19.71%
Nonpartisan	Rachel Lea Hunter	452,298	17.53%
Nonpartisan	Howard E. Manning Jr.	312,319	12.11%
Nonpartisan	Betsy McCrodden	281,777	10.92%
Nonpartisan	Ronnie Ansley	213,657	8.28%
Nonpartisan	Fred Morrison Jr.	163,601	6.34%
Nonpartisan	Marvin Schiller	64,824	2.51%
Total votes		2,679,576	100%

North Carolina Supreme Court Associate Justice (Seat 2) general election, 2012
Party	Candidate	Votes	%
Nonpartisan	Paul Martin Newby (incumbent)	1,821,562	51.90%
Nonpartisan	Sam Ervin IV	1,688,463	48.10%
Total votes		3,510,025	100%

North Carolina State Supreme Court Chief Justice seat election, 2020
Party	Candidate	Votes	%
Republican	Paul Martin Newby	2,695,951	50.004
Democratic	Cheri Beasley (incumbent)	2,695,550	49.996
Total votes		5,391,501	100.0

Legal offices
Preceded by Robert F. Orr	Associate Justice of the North Carolina Supreme Court; 2004–2020	Succeeded by Phil Berger Jr.
Preceded by Cheri Beasley	Chief Justice of the North Carolina Supreme Court; 2021–present	Incumbent
