= Richard Dietz =

American judge (born 1977)

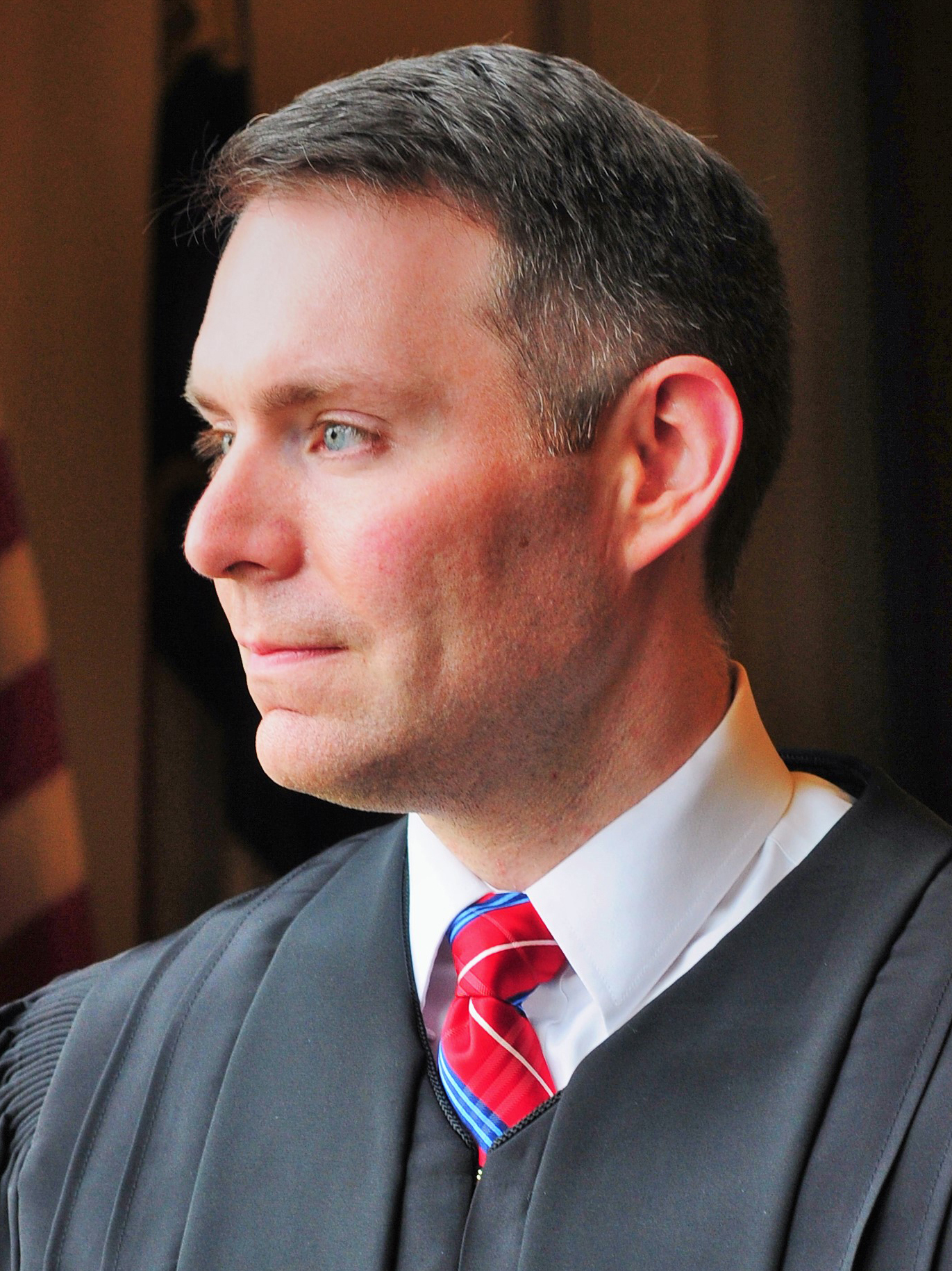
- Dietz in 2015

Associate Justice of the North Carolina Supreme Court
- Incumbent
- Assumed office January 1, 2023
- Preceded by: Robin E. Hudson

Judge on the North Carolina Court of Appeals
- In office September 8, 2014 – December 31, 2022
- Appointed by: Pat McCrory
- Preceded by: Robert N. Hunter Jr.
- Succeeded by: Allison Riggs

Personal details
- Born: Richard Donald Dietz; February 1, 1977 (age 49) Pennsylvania, U.S.
- Party: Republican
- Spouse: Kelley Dietz
- Education: Shippensburg University (BA); Wake Forest University (JD); Duke University (LLM)

Richard Donald Dietz (born February 1, 1977) is a judge on the North Carolina Supreme Court, having been elected in 2022. He previously served on the North Carolina Court of Appeals after being appointed by Governor Pat McCrory to fill the vacant seat created by the elevation of Robert N. Hunter, Jr. to the North Carolina Supreme Court.

== Background and personal life ==
Dietz grew up in a small Pennsylvania Dutch family with roots in the mountains of north central Pennsylvania. He is a Lutheran. He comes from a family of railroad and telephone workers and was the first in his family to attend college.

Dietz is married to Kelley Dietz, a Roanoke, Virginia native. The couple were married in Wait Chapel on the campus of Wake Forest University. They now live in Raleigh, North Carolina.

== Education ==
Dietz earned his bachelor's degree in business from Shippensburg University in 1999, graduating summa cum laude and serving as president of the University Honors Program. He then graduated first in his class from Wake Forest University School of Law in 2002 and served as research editor of the Wake Forest Law Review. Dietz attended both Wake Forest Law School and Shippensburg University on full academic scholarships.

== Professional career ==
After law school, Dietz was a law clerk for Judge Samuel G. Wilson of the United States District Court for the Western District of Virginia from 2002 to 2003 and Judge H. Emory Widener Jr. of the United States Court of Appeals for the Fourth Circuit from 2003 to 2004.

Following his clerkships, Dietz served as a research fellow at Kyushu University in Japan from 2004 to 2006, where he studied comparative and international law issues including the Hague Service Convention and the global implications of the Sarbanes-Oxley Act.

Dietz began his private law practice in 2006 as an associate at Covington & Burling, a large law firm in Washington, D.C. After two years in Washington, Dietz returned to Winston-Salem, North Carolina and became a partner at Kilpatrick Townsend & Stockton, a 650-lawyer international law firm with its roots in North Carolina.

Dietz handled a number of high-profile appeals in private practice. He argued at the Supreme Court of the United States in Abramski v. United States, 134 S.Ct. 2259 (2014), a prominent gun law case that addressed the scope of the straw man purchaser doctrine. Dietz also represented a class of hundreds of thousands of Native American in several appeals in the Cobell v. Salazar (1996) litigation involving the U.S. government's mismanagement of Indian trust money.

Dietz previously served as Vice Chair of the North Carolina Bar Association's Appellate Practice Section and currently serves on the Appellate Section Council and the Appellate Rules Committee. In 2013, he was appointed to a four-year term on the North Carolina Courts Commission, a group of judges, lawyers, legislators, and private citizens who study and recommend changes to the court system. He is a permanent member of the Fourth Circuit Judicial Conference and a member of the Appellate Judges Conference of the American Bar Association. He is also a member of the Chief Justice Joseph Branch chapter of the American Inns of Court.

Dietz is a North Carolina board certified specialist in Appellate Practice and one of only 27 board certified specialists in North Carolina. He was one of only two appellate specialists on the 15-member North Carolina Court of Appeals.

== Awards and honors ==
Dietz was named one of "40 Leaders Under Forty" by the Triad Business Journal in 2014.

Dietz was listed in the 2012, 2013, and 2014 editions of North Carolina Super Lawyers magazine as a "Rising Star" in the area of Appellate Law.

Dietz received the Outstanding Young Alumnus Award from Shippensburg University in 2014.

Legal offices
Preceded by Robin E. Hudson	Associate Justice of the North Carolina Supreme Court; 2023–present	Incumbent
