= North Carolina Superior Court =

The Superior Court is the U.S. state of North Carolina's general jurisdiction trial court. It was established in 1777 and is North Carolina's oldest court.

== History ==
The Superior Court is North Carolina's oldest court. It was established by a law passed on November 15, 1777, which created a "Superior Court" system with six districts, with its main duty to serve as a trial court. Under the terms of the state constitution, the court's judges were elected by the North Carolina General Assembly and served as long as they maintained good behavior. The first three judges elected were Samuel Ashe of New Hanover County, Samuel Spencer of Anson County, and future U.S. Supreme Court Justice James Iredell of Chowan County. Districts were added as the state grew. From 1799 until 1819, some Superior Court judges would sit together and serve as the state's appellate court. In 1806, areas of the state were grouped into six circuits, and Superior Court judges were required to hold sessions in every county twice a year. Circuit assignments were decided by the judges themselves, who would meet every year to schedule their sessions, under the general agreement that no judge should hold court in a given circuit consecutively. In 1857, a system of regular rotation was established.

The Superior Court operated with some irregularity during the American Civil War, especially in coastal eastern counties vulnerable to federal incursion. In the war's aftermath, North Carolina operated under a provisional government which appointed judges of courts of oyer and terminer. The state's 1865 constitutional convention granted them the authority of Superior Court judges pending the restoration of that institution. In 1868, North Carolina adopted a new constitution. The document elevated the Superior Court to a constitutional institution, and provided for all judges in the state to be popularly elected to serve eight-year terms. The number of such judges was increased to compensate for the elimination of some lower courts and the transfer of their responsibilities. The role of clerk of Superior Court was also made a county-elective office, and they were given jurisdiction over probate cases. After 1868, judges held court only in their districts, but in 1878, the previous system of statewide rotating circuits was reinstated. Superior Court judges adopted the practice of wearing robes in court at the beginning of 1958. In 1996, the North Carolina Business Court was established as a venue for Superior Court judges to try cases involving complex questions of corporate and commercial law.

== Jurisdiction ==
The Superior Court Division, alongside the Appellate Division, and the District Court Division, make up North Carolina's unified court system, the General Court of Justice. The Superior Court is the trial court of general jurisdiction in the state. In criminal matters, superior courts hear all felony cases and handle appeals of misdemeanors and infractions from District Courts. In civil matters, superior courts have original jurisdiction over civil disputes with an amount in controversy exceeding $25,000. The Superior Court also adjudicates most appeals from state administrative agencies.

== Structure ==
=== Superior Court administration ===
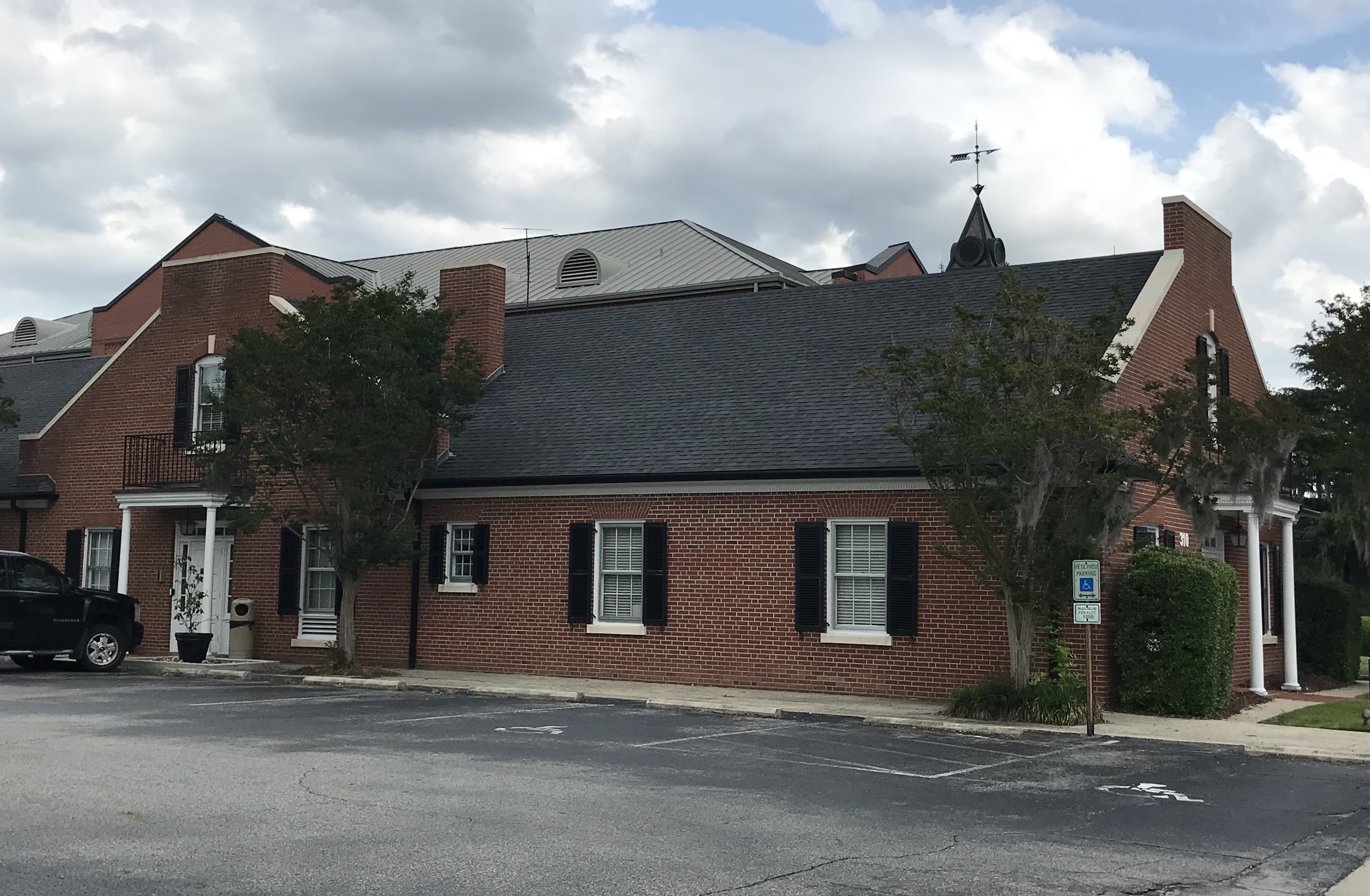
Superior Court judge office building in New Bern, North Carolina

The Superior Courts are divided into five divisions and further into 48 districts. As of 2022, there are 109 Superior Court judges. Judges are constitutionally required to be licensed attorneys, but are forbidden from engaging in the private practice of law during their tenures. They must also be under the age of 72 years. They are popularly elected in the district in which they reside and serve a term of eight years. The governor appoints judges to fill vacancies on the bench pending the next state legislative election or until the expiration of a preceding incumbent's term. Special Superior Court judges are nominated by the governor and confirmed by the General Assembly to serve five-year terms, and may serve in a district in which they do not reside. The chief justice of the Supreme Court may also assign judges to districts in emergency situations. Judges are required by the state constitution to rotate from district to district within their division every six months in order to avoid the incidence of conflicts of interest.

The administrative affairs of each district are supervised by a senior resident judge. A clerk of Superior Court is elected in every county to keep court records. The clerk also serves as a judge of probate and is empowered to hold certain hearings, such as in cases involving adoptions, questions of guardianship for incompetent adults, and partitions of land. Senior resident judges may remove clerks from office in their district for misconduct or incapacity, and vacancies in clerk's offices are filled by the appointment of the senior resident judge pending the next state legislative election. The clerks are also responsible for nominating local magistrates, subject to the confirmation of the senior resident judge.

=== North Carolina Business Court ===
At the direction of the chief justice of the North Carolina Supreme Court, a special superior court judge may convene the North Carolina Business Court to oversee trials involving complex questions of corporate and commercial law. Ben F. Tennille was the first appointed Business Court judge. It is one of the oldest and most influential business courts in the United States.

Although the Supreme Court created the Business Court via amending General Rules of Practice 2.1 and 2.2, North Carolina's executive and legislative branches have been involved with the Business Court's implementation and development. The Business Court's jurisdiction includes statutorily based mandatory complex business cases and discretionary complex business cases, as well as Supreme Court rule based exceptional cases, under General Rule of Practice 2.1. As of January 1, 2021, by statute, the Business Court was given jurisdiction of certain commercial receiverships. Again by statute, the Business Court also hears certain tax related claims.

The legislature first expanded the number of Business Court judges in 2005, from one to three, and there were five judges as of 2017, which remains the number (as of May 2024).

In 2014, the Business Court Modernization Act became law, providing for, among other things, a direct right of appeal to the North Carolina Supreme Court, expanding on the longstanding practice of issuing written opinions, and refining the court's case type jurisdiction.

There are a distinct set of North Carolina Business Court Rules. Among other things, this includes mandatory mediation under Rule 11, mediation being an important component of Business Court practice from its early days.

== See also ==
- Courts of North Carolina
