= North Carolina Supreme Court =

Highest court in the U.S. state of North Carolina

Coordinates: 35.779412°N 78.638479°W

- Seal of the Supreme Court of North Carolina

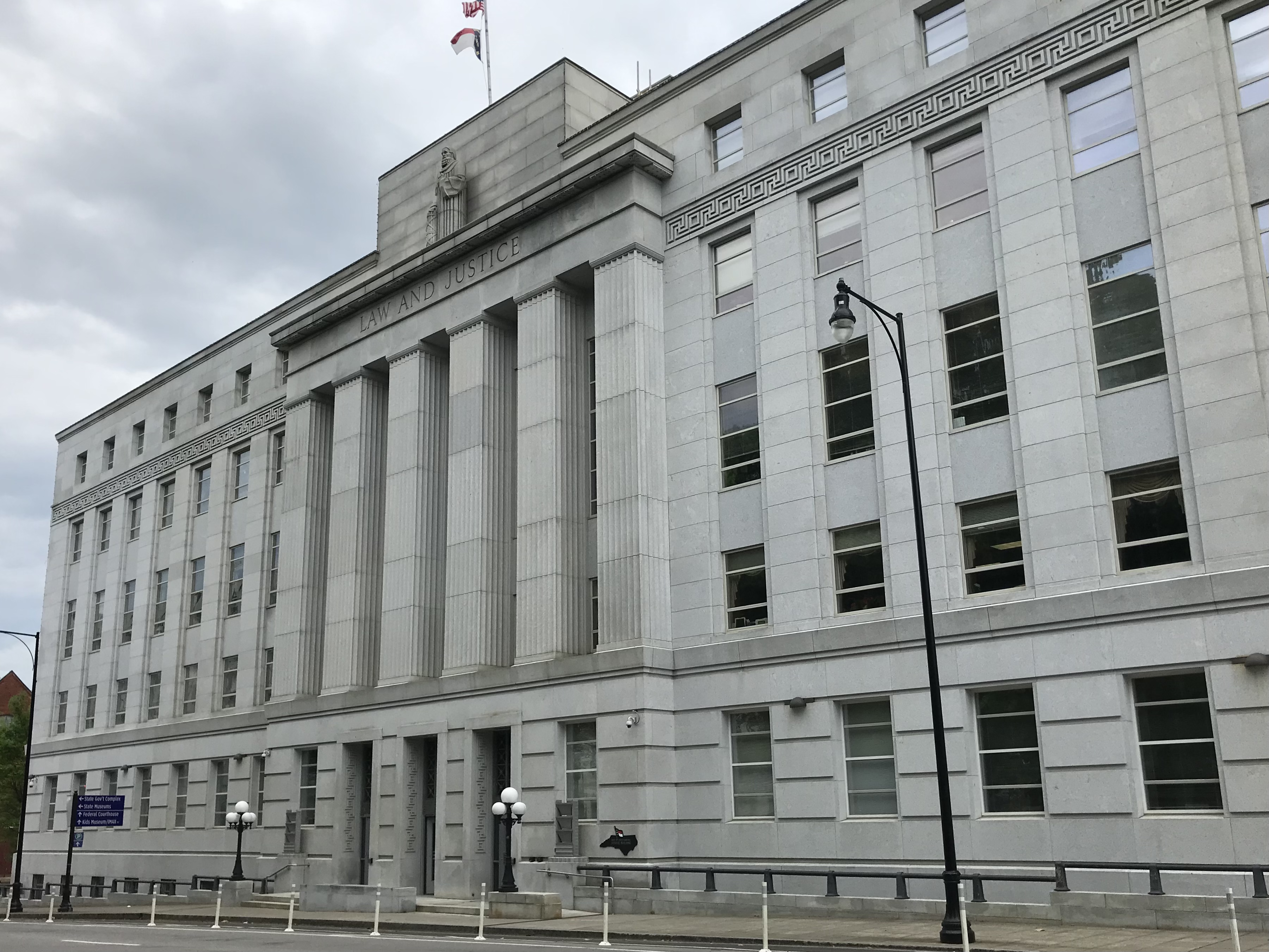
- Law and Justice Building
- Interactive map of North Carolina Supreme Court
- Established: 1818
- Jurisdiction: North Carolina, United States
- Location: Raleigh, North Carolina
- Composition method: Partisan election
- Authorized by: Constitution of North Carolina
- Appeals to: Supreme Court of the United States
- Appeals from: North Carolina Court of Appeals
- Judge term length: 8 years (mandatory retirement at the age of 76)
- Number of positions: 7
- Website: Official website

Chief Justice
- Currently: Paul Martin Newby
- Since: January 1, 2021
- Lead position ends: December 31, 2028

The Supreme Court of the State of North Carolina is the state of North Carolina's highest appellate court. Until the creation of the North Carolina Court of Appeals in the 1960s, it was the state's only appellate court. The Supreme Court consists of six associate justices and one chief justice, although the number of justices has varied. The primary function of the Supreme Court is to decide questions of law that have arisen in the lower courts and before state administrative agencies.

== History ==
The state of North Carolina's first constitution, adopted in 1776, permitted the North Carolina General Assembly to appoint "Judges of the Supreme Courts of Law and Equity", but no appellate court was created for several years. The first was the Court of Conference, established in 1799, consisting of several North Carolina Superior Court judges sitting en banc twice each year to review appeals from their courts. In 1805, the General Assembly renamed the institution the Supreme Court, but left its composition the same. Five years later a law was passed empowering the governor to provide an official seal and motto for the court and granting the right of appeal to all parties in cases adjudicated by the Superior Court. The law also stipulated that the judges should record their decisions in writing and read them in court and permitted them to elect a chief justice from among their ranks. John Louis Taylor was selected as the first chief justice.

In 1818, the General Assembly approved a bill proposed by State Senator William Gaston to create a distinct, independent supreme court with exclusive appellate jurisdiction over questions of law and equity arising from superior court cases. The court comprised three judges appointed by the General Assembly, with the judges to select a chief justice from among their number. Judges were salaried and served indefinitely "during good behavior". Interim vacancies were to be filled by the governor with the advice of the Council of State. The first judges were Taylor, Leonard Henderson, and John Hall. Henderson and Hall made Taylor chief justice, and the court held its first meeting on January 1, 1819. Eventually, it shifted to a schedule of sitting for two terms annually, with the first commencing on the second Monday in June and the second on the last Monday in December.

From 1819 until it burned down in 1831, the court met in the North Carolina State Capitol in Raleigh. After the fire, the court briefly convened in the meeting house of the First Presbyterian Church until the capitol was rebuilt. Growing Jacksonian sentiment in North Carolina throughout the 1820s and 1830s generated populist anger towards the court, with many citizens feeling the institution was distant from the people and that the judges were over-compensated. Populist legislators introduced a measure to reduce the judges' salaries in 1832 and a constitutional amendment to abolish the court in 1835, but such actions did not succeed. Legal scholar Martin H. Brinkley attributed the court's survival to "the personal prestige of the judges themselves", particularly Thomas Ruffin and Gaston, who respectively joined the court in 1829 and 1833.

In 1846, the General Assembly passed a law requiring the court hold a term in Morganton every year to ease travel burdens for lawyers in the western portion of the state. The court had no access to a law library during its stay in the city, and many lawyers later criticized the decisions made there for being deficient. The justices stopped traveling to Morganton after the outbreak of the American Civil War in 1861. They conducted little business during the war.

After the war, the state of North Carolina adopted a new constitution in 1868. The overhauled judicial article prescribed the creation of a supreme court comprising five judges, namely one chief justice and four associate justices, all to be popularly-elected to serve eight-year terms. The governor was responsible for filling interim vacancies on the court pending the holding of the next state legislative election.

During the Reconstruction era, the court's membership was dominated by Republicans, though as the era waned in the latter portion of the 19th century, conservative Democrats became a majority on the court. In 1876, the constitution was amended to shrink the court's membership to three justices. This burdened the court's members with a heavy workload, and after the apparent stress-induced death of Justice Thomas Samuel Ashe, the constitution was amended to restore the court to its previous size in 1888. Beginning that year, the Supreme Court met in buildings located along the periphery of Union Square in Raleigh. In 1900, the Supreme Court ruled a law passed by the 1899 Democratic-dominated legislature was unconstitutional. In response, in 1901, the North Carolina House of Representatives voted to impeach Republican Chief Justice David M. Furches and Associate Justice Robert M. Douglas for issuing a supposedly unconstitutional mandamus directing the state treasurer to disburse money. The Senate failed to convict and remove them lacking the necessary two-thirds majority, leaving them to serve out their terms in office. This marked the only time the court's justices were impeached.

In 1936, North Carolina's constitution was amended to provide for the Supreme Court to comprise a chief justice and at most six associate justices. The following year, the General Assembly empowered the governor to appoint two additional associate justices, thus allowing the court to expand to seven justices. In September 1940, the court moved into the new Justice Building near the State Capitol. The North Carolina Court of Appeals was created as an intermediate appellate court in 1967 in part to help ease the workload of the Supreme Court.

The General Assembly made Supreme Court elections non-partisan starting with the 2004 elections, but later made them partisan again after the 2016 elections.

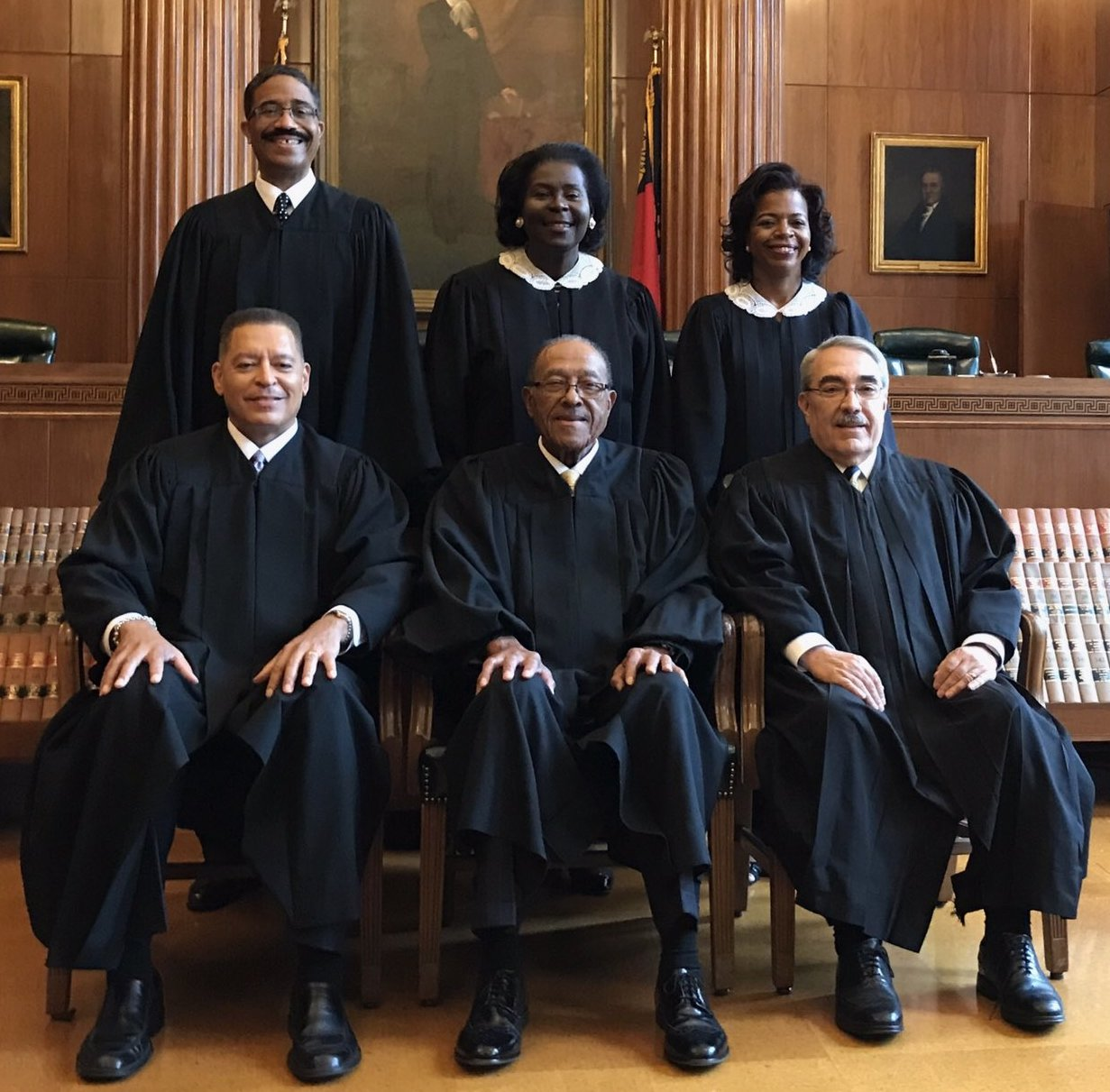
Six African American former justices of the North Carolina Supreme Court (back to front, left to right): Michael R. Morgan, Patricia Timmons-Goodson, Cheri Beasley, James A. Wynn Jr., Henry Frye, G. K. Butterfield.

Susie Sharp became the court's first female justice in 1962. She became its first female chief justice in 1974. Henry Frye became the first black justice in 1983. In 2011, the court had a female majority for the first time.

In October 1975, the court adopted a new official seal, amending the Latin phrase Suum cuique to Suum cuique tribuere.

== Function ==
=== Jurisdiction ===
The Supreme Court, along with the Court of Appeals, constitute the Appellate Division within North Carolina's unified court system, the General Court of Justice. The primary function of the Supreme Court is to decide questions of law that have arisen in the lower courts and before state administrative agencies. The court's docket is typically dominated by cases concerning interpretation of the constitution, major legal questions, and appeals of criminal cases involving capital punishment. First-degree murder convictions entailing capital sentences reached in trial courts are automatically scheduled for the court's review, as are cases involving North Carolina Utilities Commission rate determinations. The court may, at its discretion, hear appeals of decisions of the Court of Appeals. It has the power to depublish Court of Appeals decisions, thus allowing a lower ruling to stand but preventing it from forming legal precedent. Since 1893, the court has held that, in instances of equal divide between its justices—when the circumstance of vacancy or recusal allows for such a happening—on a ruling, the decision of a lower court is res judicata but cannot form precedent.

The court's sole original jurisdiction is over cases of judicial discipline heard on the recommendation of the Judicial Standards Commission. It may, at its discretion, chose to hear direct appeals from trial courts without them first being brought before the Court of Appeals, if the court determines that a case involves a significant public interest, raises questions of major legal principles, or if a delay in its resolution would risk great harm. Justices of the court also sometimes issue advisory opinions in response to questions of law brought by officials in the executive and legislative branches.

=== Session ===
The Supreme Court is constitutionally required to meet in Raleigh, unless directed otherwise by the General Assembly. State law permits the court to hold sessions in Morganton and Edenton. The court and its staff are housed in the Justice Building at 2 East Morgan Street in Raleigh. The justices sit for proceedings in a courtroom on the third floor.

=== Administrative responsibilities ===
The justices appoint their own court clerk, librarian, and reporter. The chief justice of the court is responsible for appointing the director of the North Carolina Administrative Office of the Courts, the chief administrative law judge of the Office of Administrative Hearings, the chief judge of the Court of Appeals, and the chief district court judges in each North Carolina District Courts district. A justice of the court is required by the constitution to administer the oath of office to an incoming governor. As the head of the state's General Court of Justice, the Supreme Court schedules the sessions of the North Carolina Superior Court, and is responsible for adopting the statewide Code of Judicial Conduct, which regulates the behavior of judges in the state.

=== Impeachments and removal ===
In the event the governor or lieutenant governor is impeached by the North Carolina House of Representatives, the chief justice of the Supreme Court presides over the impeachment trial in the North Carolina Senate. Justices of the Supreme Court can also be impeached and removed by the legislature.

== Court composition ==
The Supreme Court consists of one chief justice and six associate justices. In the event the chief justice is temporarily unavailable, the senior associate justice may assume their responsibilities. The constitution permits the General Assembly to increase the number of associate justices to eight. Justices are popularly elected and serve eight-year terms. All candidates for election or appointment to the court must be licensed to practice law in the state.

== Justices ==
=== Current justices ===
The court's current members are:

Seat	Name	Born	Start	Term ends (Note: Term ends on December 31 of the year listed.)	Mandatory retirement (Note: North Carolina judges must retire by the last day of the month in which they turn age 76.)	Party	Law school
Chief Justice	Paul Martin Newby	May 5, 1955 (age 71)	November 29, 2004 (Note: Originally elected as Associate Justice. Elected as Chief Justice in 2020 and began term on January 1, 2021.)	2028	May 31, 2031	Republican	North Carolina
1	Anita Earls	February 20, 1960 (age 66)	January 1, 2019	2034	February 29, 2036	Democratic	Yale
2	Phil Berger Jr.	March 26, 1972 (age 54)	January 1, 2021	2028	March 31, 2048	Republican	Wake Forest
4	Tamara P. Barringer	December 1, 1958 (age 67)	January 1, 2021	2028	December 31, 2034	Republican	North Carolina
3	Richard Dietz	February 1, 1977 (age 49)	January 1, 2023	2030	February 28, 2053	Republican	Wake Forest
5	Trey Allen	November 20, 1974 (age 51)	January 1, 2023	2030	November 30, 2050	Republican	North Carolina
6	Allison Riggs	May 8, 1981 (age 45)	September 13, 2023 (Note: Initially appointed by Gov. Roy Cooper (D). Subsequently elected to a full term in 2024.)	2032	May 31, 2057	Democratic	Florida

== See also ==
- North Carolina Court of Appeals

== Works cited ==
- Britt, David M.; Hunter, Robert N. Jr. (2017), The History of the First 50 Years of the North Carolina Court of Appeals (PDF), North Carolina Court of Appeals
- Cooper, Christopher A.; Knotts, H. Gibbs, eds. (2012). The New Politics of North Carolina. Chapel Hill: University of North Carolina Press. ISBN 9781469606583.
- Orth, John V.; Newby, Paul M. (2013). The North Carolina State Constitution (second ed.). Oxford University Press. ISBN 9780199300655.
- Orth, John V. (September 2015). ""Without Precedential Value" -- When the Justices of the Supreme Court of North Carolina are Equally Divided". North Carolina Law Review. 93 (6): 1719–1756.
