= Sarah Parker =

American judge

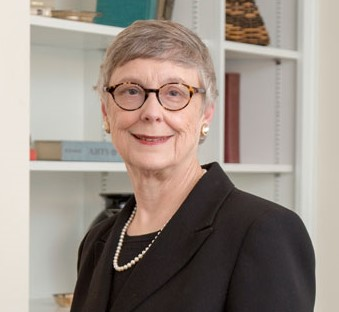

Chief Justice of the North Carolina Supreme Court
- In office February 6, 2006 – August 31, 2014
- Appointed by: Mike Easley
- Preceded by: I. Beverly Lake Jr.
- Succeeded by: Mark Martin

Associate Justice of the North Carolina Supreme Court
- In office January 2, 1995 – February 6, 2006
- Appointed by: Jim Hunt
- Preceded by: Burley Mitchell
- Succeeded by: Patricia Timmons-Goodson
- In office January 1, 1993 – January 1, 1995
- Preceded by: I. Beverly Lake Jr.
- Succeeded by: I. Beverly Lake Jr.

Judge of the North Carolina Court of Appeals
- In office 1984–1993

Personal details
- Born: August 23, 1942 (age 84) Charlotte, North Carolina, U.S.
- Party: Democratic
- Education: Meredith College (BA); University of North Carolina at Chapel Hill (JD)
- Occupation: Lawyer

Sarah Elizabeth Parker (born August 23, 1942) is an American judge who served as the chief justice of the North Carolina Supreme Court from February 2006 until August 2014.

== Education and career ==
Born in Charlotte, North Carolina, Parker attended Meredith College, graduated from the University of North Carolina at Chapel Hill with an Education degree and served with the Peace Corps in Turkey from 1964 to 1966 before returning to Chapel Hill to earn a J.D. degree (1969). After working in private law practice for 15 years, Parker was named by Governor Jim Hunt to the North Carolina Court of Appeals in late 1984. Voters elected and re-elected her to that Court in 1986 and 1990.

Parker was elected by the people to the state's Supreme Court in November 1992. After she lost a bid for re-election to a full term in 1994, she was reappointed to another seat by Hunt. She was elected to a regular 8-year term on the court in 1996. In 2004, Parker was elected to another eight-year term on the court, defeating John Tyson in the statewide judicial elections.

== Chief Justice ==
On January 19, 2006, Governor Mike Easley announced that he was appointing Parker Chief Justice of the Supreme Court, to replace the retiring I. Beverly Lake Jr. Parker took the oath of office on February 6, becoming the third female Chief Justice of North Carolina's highest court, after Susie Sharp and Rhoda Billings.

At the time of her appointment, former justice Bob Orr, a Republican and executive director of the N.C. Institute for Constitutional Law, was quoted in the Charlotte Observer calling Parker "probably one of the more conservative justices that has been on the court in a good long while.... She's going to be reluctant to go out on a limb.... My sense is that you would find very few cases that were close to the line where she favored criminal defendants." Parker calls herself a moderate conservative. "I tend to stick very closely to precedent and the intent of the legislature as expressed in the language of the statute," she said in that article.

Parker decided to run for a full term as chief justice in the November 2006 election. Although judicial races in North Carolina were non-partisan at the time, Parker was backed by the North Carolina Democratic Party.

On November 7, 2006, Parker was elected Chief Justice by a 2-to-1 margin over Judge Rusty Duke. She was inducted into the North Carolina Women's Hall of Fame in 2011.

Parker stepped down from the court on August 31, 2014, after she reached the state's mandatory retirement age for judges. Governor Pat McCrory appointed Mark Martin, the court's senior Associate Justice, to replace her through the 2014 election.

== Electoral history ==
=== 2006 ===
North Carolina Supreme Court Chief Justice election, 2006
| Party | Candidate | Votes | % |
|---|---|---|---|
| Nonpartisan | Sarah Parker (incumbent) | 1,138,346 | 66.67% |
| Nonpartisan | Rusty Duke | 568,980 | 33.33% |
| Total votes | | 1,707,326 | 100% |

=== 2004 ===
North Carolina Supreme Court Associate Justice (Parker seat) election, 2004
| Party | Candidate | Votes | % |
|---|---|---|---|
| Nonpartisan | Sarah Parker (incumbent) | 1,732,399 | 63.92% |
| Nonpartisan | John Tyson | 977,861 | 36.08% |
| Total votes | | 2,710,260 | 100% |

=== 1996 ===
North Carolina Supreme Court Associate Justice (Parker seat) election, 1996
| Party | Candidate | Votes | % |
|---|---|---|---|
| Democratic | Sarah Parker (incumbent) | 1,323,327 | 55.69% |
| Republican | Carl Tilghman | 1,052,786 | 44.31% |
| Total votes | | 2,376,113 | 100% |
| Democratic hold | | | |

=== 1994 ===
North Carolina Supreme Court Associate Justice (Parker seat) election, 1994
| Party | Candidate | Votes | % |
|---|---|---|---|
| Republican | I. Beverly Lake Jr. | 757,870 | 54.78% |
| Democratic | Sarah Parker (incumbent) | 625,656 | 45.22% |
| Total votes | | 1,383,526 | 100% |
| Republican gain from Democratic | | | |

=== 1992 ===
North Carolina Supreme Court Associate Justice (Lake seat) election, 1992
| Party | Candidate | Votes | % |
|---|---|---|---|
| Democratic | Sarah Parker | 1,277,057 | 53.27% |
| Republican | I. Beverly Lake Jr. (incumbent) | 1,120,479 | 46.73% |
| Total votes | | 2,397,536 | 100% |
| Democratic gain from Republican | | | |

== See also ==
- List of female state supreme court justices

Legal offices
| Preceded by I. Beverly Lake Jr. | Associate Justice of the North Carolina Supreme Court; 1993–1995 | Succeeded by I. Beverly Lake Jr. |
| Preceded by Burley Mitchell | Associate Justice of the North Carolina Supreme Court; 1995–2006 | Succeeded by Patricia Timmons-Goodson |
| Preceded by I. Beverly Lake Jr. | Chief Justice of the North Carolina Supreme Court; 2006–2014 | Succeeded by Mark Martin |
