= Douglas McCullough =

American lawyer and judge (1945–2022)

Judge of the North Carolina Court of Appeals
- In office January 21, 2011 – April 24, 2017
- Preceded by: Cressie Thigpen
- Succeeded by: John S. Arrowood
- In office January 1, 2001 – December 31, 2008
- Preceded by: Clarence Horton
- Succeeded by: Cheri Beasley

Personal details
- Born: John Douglas McCullough; May 28, 1945
- Died: October 18, 2022 (aged 77) North Las Vegas, Nevada, U.S.
- Party: Republican
- Spouse: Lucci
- Children: 2
- Education: University of North Carolina at Chapel Hill (BA); University of South Carolina (JD)

J. Douglas McCullough (May 28, 1945 – October 18, 2022) was an American lawyer and former judge of the North Carolina Court of Appeals. McCullough retired in 2017.

== Education and career ==
After earning a history degree from the University of North Carolina at Chapel Hill in 1967 and a Juris Doctor degree from the University of South Carolina in 1970, McCullough served in the United States Marine Corps, retiring as a colonel in the Marine Corps Reserves. McCullough worked as legislative counsel for New Mexico Senator Harrison Schmitt, as a counsel to the United States Senate, and finally as an Assistant United States Attorney in the eastern district of North Carolina from 1981 through 1996, when he left to enter private practice.

In November 2000, McCullough was elected to the North Carolina Court of Appeals with just over 50 percent of the vote, defeating incumbent Clarence Horton.

== Personal life ==
He is married to Lucci McCullough and has two children. He resides in Atlantic Beach, North Carolina.

On October 7, 2006, McCullough was charged with drunk driving. He pleaded guilty to driving while impaired on April 3, 2007.

== Elections ==
=== 2008 re-election campaign ===
McCullough is a registered Republican, but in his 2008 bid for re-election, he cited bipartisan support from notables such as former NC Supreme Court Chief Justices Burley Mitchell (a Democrat) and I. Beverly Lake Jr. (a Republican). He also enjoyed support from former North Carolina Court of Appeals Judges S. Gerald Arnold, Sidney S. Eagles, K. Edward Greene, and Albert S. Thomas Jr.

McCullough was criticized in 2007 for implying that he and other incumbent Republican incumbents should be re-elected because they would favor Republicans in an anticipated lawsuit over redistricting. An ethics complaint was filed against him as a result of his comments. In response to the complaint, the state Judicial Standards Commission said it would not punish McCullough, but it also said that it had made "an effort to ensure such conduct is not repeated."

McCullough was defeated in the November 2008 election by state District Court judge Cheri Beasley.

=== 2010 election ===
McCullough won a new term on the Court of Appeals in 2010, when he came in second in the first round, but won the second round, of the first use of instant runoff voting for a statewide election in North Carolina. He narrowly defeated appointed incumbent judge Cressie Thigpen.

=== Electoral history ===
==== 2010 ====
North Carolina Court of Appeals (Wynn seat) election, 2010
Party	Candidate	Votes	%
Nonpartisan	Cressie Thigpen (incumbent)	395,220	20.33%
Nonpartisan	Douglas McCullough	295,619	15.21%
Nonpartisan	Chris Dillon	201,870	10.39%
Nonpartisan	Anne Middleton	174,556	8.98%
Nonpartisan	Daniel E. Garner	153,971	7.92%
Nonpartisan	Jewel Ann Farlow	151,747	7.81%
Nonpartisan	Harry Payne	99,257	5.11%
Nonpartisan	Stan Hammer	96,451	4.96%
Nonpartisan	Mark E. Klass	90,526	4.66%
Nonpartisan	Pamela M. Vesper	90,116	4.64%
Nonpartisan	John F. Bloss	78,857	4.06%
Nonpartisan	John Sullivan	69,971	3.60%
Nonpartisan	J. Wesley Casteen	45,610	2.35%
Total votes		1,943,771	100%

North Carolina Court of Appeals (Wynn seat) election, 2010
Party	Candidate	Votes	%
Nonpartisan	Douglas McCullough	543,980	50.31%
Nonpartisan	Cressie Thigpen (incumbent)	537,325	49.69%
Total votes		1,081,305	100%

==== 2008 ====
North Carolina Court of Appeals (McCullough seat) election, 2008
Party	Candidate	Votes	%
Nonpartisan	Cheri Beasley	1,706,132	57.42%
Nonpartisan	Douglas McCullough (incumbent)	1,265,378	42.58%
Total votes		2,971,510	100%

==== 2000 ====
North Carolina Court of Appeals (Horton seat) election, 2000
Party	Candidate	Votes	%
Republican	Douglas McCullough	1,371,798	50.32%
Democratic	Clarence E. Horton Jr. (incumbent)	1,354,543	49.68%
Total votes		2,726,341	100%
Republican gain from Democratic			

Legal offices
Preceded by Clarence Horton	Judge of the North Carolina Court of Appeals; 2001–2009	Succeeded by Cheri Beasley
Preceded by Cressie Thigpen	Judge of the North Carolina Court of Appeals; 2011–2017	Succeeded by John S. Arrowood
