= Sam J. Ervin IV =

American judge

Sam Ervin

Associate Justice of the North Carolina Supreme Court
- In office January 1, 2015 – December 31, 2022
- Preceded by: Robert N. Hunter Jr.
- Succeeded by: Trey Allen

Judge of the North Carolina Court of Appeals
- In office January 1, 2009 – December 31, 2014
- Preceded by: John M. Tyson
- Succeeded by: Robert N. Hunter Jr.

Personal details
- Born: Samuel James Ervin IV; November 18, 1955 (age 70) Morganton, North Carolina, U.S.
- Party: Democratic
- Education: Davidson College (BA); Harvard University (JD)

Samuel James Ervin IV (born November 18, 1955) is a North Carolina lawyer and jurist who served on the North Carolina Supreme Court from 2015 to 2022. He previously served as a state Utilities Commissioner and as a judge of the North Carolina Court of Appeals. He is the grandson of U.S. Senator Sam J. Ervin, Jr. and the son of U.S. Court of Appeals for the Fourth Circuit Judge Sam J. Ervin III.

== Early life and career ==
Ervin was born and raised in Morganton, North Carolina, where he lives today. Ervin attended Burke County public schools and graduated in 1974 from Freedom High School. He graduated magna cum laude from Davidson College, where he majored in history, and he earned his Juris Doctor degree, cum laude, from Harvard Law School in 1981.

Ervin practiced law in Morganton from 1981 until 1999. In 1999, Ervin was appointed to the North Carolina Utilities Commission by Governor Jim Hunt. He was reappointed by Governor Mike Easley in 2007. The Utilities Commission is a quasi-judicial agency responsible for regulating investor-owned electric, natural gas, telecommunications, and water and sewer companies providing service in North Carolina.

From 2004 until 2007, Ervin served as Chairman of the Committee on Electricity of the National Association of Regulatory Utility Commissioners (NARUC). He has testified before the U.S. House of Representatives concerning the Yucca Mountain nuclear waste repository.

== Judicial career ==
In his 2008 campaign for the North Carolina Court of Appeals, Ervin was endorsed by the North Carolina Police Benevolent Association and The Charlotte Observer before the primary. He came in first in the May 6 non-partisan primary, with 37 percent of the vote. Ervin and runner-up Kristin Ruth advanced to the November general election. He was again endorsed by the Charlotte Observer for the general election. Ervin won the November election with approximately 53 percent of the vote.

In 2012, Ervin announced that he would run for a seat on the North Carolina Supreme Court. He lost this race, receiving 48.1% of the vote to the incumbent Justice Paul Newby's 51.9%.

Ervin ran for the Supreme Court again in 2014, this time for the seat being vacated by Justice Mark Martin. He was endorsed by The Charlotte Observer and the (Raleigh) News and Observer, as well as by former Chief Justices Burley Mitchell and Henry E. Frye and Court of Appeals Chief Judges Sidney S. Eagles, Jr. and Gerald Arnold. Ervin defeated Justice Robert N. Hunter, Jr. with approximately 52 percent of the vote, according to unofficial returns.

Legal offices
| Preceded by Robert N. Hunter Jr. | Associate Justice of the North Carolina Supreme Court; 2015–2022 | Succeeded by Trey Allen |
