= Cressie Thigpen =

American judge

Cressie H. Thigpen

Judge of the North Carolina Court of Appeals
- In office January 3, 2011 – December 31, 2012
- Appointed by: Bev Perdue
- Preceded by: Barbara Jackson
- Succeeded by: Chris Dillon
- In office August 23, 2010 – December 31, 2010
- Appointed by: Bev Perdue
- Preceded by: James Andrew Wynn
- Succeeded by: Douglas McCullough

Personal details
- Born: Cressie H. Thigpen Jr. August 12, 1946 (age 80)
- Party: Democratic
- Education: North Carolina Central University (BBA); Rutgers University (JD)

Cressie H. Thigpen Jr. is a North Carolina lawyer and jurist who served on the North Carolina Court of Appeals.

== Early life and education ==
Thigpen was born August 12, 1946. He received his bachelor's degree in business administration from North Carolina Central University in 1966 and his Juris Doctor degree from Rutgers University in 1973. He is a veteran of the Peace Corps.

== Career ==
Thigpen served as a special superior court judge from May 2008 until his 2010 appointment to the Court of Appeals. Previously, he was a partner in the law firm now known as Blue, Stephens & Fellers.

In 1999, he was elected president of the state bar – the first African-American to hold that post.

He has served as chairman of the board of trustees of North Carolina Central University, and has served on the board of trustees for the University of North Carolina at Chapel Hill.

=== Court of Appeals ===
Governor Bev Perdue appointed Thigpen to the Court of Appeals in August 2010 to replace Judge James Andrew Wynn, who had been appointed to the U.S. Court of Appeals. In the election that followed in November 2010, Thigpen lost to former Judge Douglas McCullough in what was the state's first use of instant runoff voting for a statewide election. Thigpen was then appointed by Gov. Perdue to fill a different seat on the Court of Appeals, which became vacant when Barbara Jackson won election to the North Carolina Supreme Court. He then ran in the 2012 election to retain his seat. Thigpen was endorsed by the (Raleigh) News and Observer, which wrote, "Thigpen has performed well on the court, and has long legal experience and a record of service to the region and state." He was also endorsed by former Court of Appeals Chief Judge Sidney S. Eagles Jr. and former Supreme Court Chief Justices Henry Frye and Burley Mitchell. Nevertheless, Thigpen was defeated in the 2012 election by Chris Dillon.

== Electoral history ==
=== 2012 ===
North Carolina Court of Appeals (Thigpen seat) election, 2012
Party	Candidate	Votes	%
Nonpartisan	Chris Dillon	1,779,906	52.74%
Nonpartisan	Cressie Thigpen (incumbent)	1,594,799	47.26%
Total votes		3,374,705	100%

=== 2010 ===
North Carolina Court of Appeals (Wynn seat) election, 2010
Party	Candidate	Votes	%
Nonpartisan	Cressie Thigpen (incumbent)	395,220	20.33%
Nonpartisan	Douglas McCullough	295,619	15.21%
Nonpartisan	Chris Dillon	201,870	10.39%
Nonpartisan	Anne Middleton	174,556	8.98%
Nonpartisan	Daniel E. Garner	153,971	7.92%
Nonpartisan	Jewel Ann Farlow	151,747	7.81%
Nonpartisan	Harry Payne	99,257	5.11%
Nonpartisan	Stan Hammer	96,451	4.96%
Nonpartisan	Mark E. Klass	90,526	4.66%
Nonpartisan	Pamela M. Vesper	90,116	4.64%
Nonpartisan	John F. Bloss	78,857	4.06%
Nonpartisan	John Sullivan	69,971	3.60%
Nonpartisan	J. Wesley Casteen	45,610	2.35%
Total votes		1,943,771	100%

North Carolina Court of Appeals (Wynn seat) election, 2010
Party	Candidate	Votes	%
Nonpartisan	Douglas McCullough	543,980	50.31%
Nonpartisan	Cressie Thigpen (incumbent)	537,325	49.69%
Total votes		1,081,305	100%

Legal offices
Preceded by James Andrew Wynn	Judge of the North Carolina Court of Appeals; 2010–2011	Succeeded by Douglas McCullough
Preceded by Barbara Jackson	Judge of the North Carolina Court of Appeals; 2011–2013	Succeeded by Chris Dillon
