= 2004 North Carolina judicial elections =

Several judges of the North Carolina Supreme Court and the North Carolina Court of Appeals, the state's two appellate courts, were elected on November 2, 2004. The Presidential, U.S. Senate, U.S. House, Gubernatorial, Council of State, State Senate, and State House elections were also held on the same day.

Appellate judges in North Carolina are elected to eight-year terms in statewide judicial elections. In 2004, for the first time, all these elections were non-partisan. If more than two candidates filed for a given seat, a non-partisan primary would be held, and the two highest vote-getters, regardless of party, would advance to the general election. The only 2004 race in which more than two candidates filed for the primary was the Thornburg Court of Appeals seat.

== Supreme Court (Seat 2) ==
The resignation of Associate Justice Bob Orr, too late for a primary election to be held, led to a situation in which there was no primary election to eliminate candidates, but rather, the winner was simply determined by plurality. Eight candidates filed: Assistant U.S. Attorney Paul Martin Newby (who received the endorsement of the state Republican Party), North Carolina Superior Court Judge Howard Manning, Pre-Paid Legal Services attorney and former judicial law clerk Rachel Hunter, Administrative Law Judge Fred Morrison, attorney Ronnie Ansley, former appeals court judge Betsy McCrodden, current appeals court judge James Andrew Wynn, and attorney Marvin Schiller (who had just lost in the primary for the Thornburg Court of Appeals seat).

North Carolina Supreme Court Associate Justice (Seat 2) general election, 2004
Party	Candidate	Votes	%
Nonpartisan	Paul Martin Newby	582,684	22.59%
Nonpartisan	James Andrew Wynn	508,416	19.71%
Nonpartisan	Rachel Lea Hunter	452,298	17.53%
Nonpartisan	Howard E. Manning Jr.	312,319	12.11%
Nonpartisan	Betsy McCrodden	281,777	10.92%
Nonpartisan	Ronnie Ansley	213,657	8.28%
Nonpartisan	Fred Morrison Jr.	163,601	6.34%
Nonpartisan	Marvin Schiller	64,824	2.51%
Total votes		2,679,576	100%

== Supreme Court (Seat 4) ==
Associate Justice Sarah Parker, the incumbent, was challenged by Court of Appeals Judge John Tyson.

North Carolina Supreme Court Associate Justice (Seat 4) general election, 2004
Party	Candidate	Votes	%
Nonpartisan	Sarah Parker (incumbent)	1,732,399	63.92%
Nonpartisan	John Tyson	977,861	36.08%
Total votes		2,710,260	100%

== Court of Appeals (Seat 4) ==
Incumbent Judge Linda McGee was challenged by attorney Bill Parker.

North Carolina Court of Appeals Judge (Seat 4) general election, 2004
Party	Candidate	Votes	%
Nonpartisan	Linda McGee (incumbent)	1,520,455	57.76%
Nonpartisan	Bill Parker	1,112,128	42.24%
Total votes		2,632,583	100%

== Court of Appeals (Seat 5) ==
Incumbent Judge Wanda Bryant had been appointed to the Court by the Governor following her 2002 defeat for a different seat. She was challenged by Wake County District Court Judge Alice Stubbs.

North Carolina Court of Appeals Judge (Seat 5) general election, 2004
Party	Candidate	Votes	%
Nonpartisan	Wanda Bryant (incumbent)	1,416,123	54.46%
Nonpartisan	Alice C. Stubbs	1,183,962	46.54%
Total votes		2,600,085	100%

== Court of Appeals (Seat 6) ==
Incumbent Judge Alan Thornburg had been appointed to the court by the Governor. Three candidates filed to challenge Thornburg for a full term: Barbara Jackson, who was then general counsel at the N.C. Department of Labor, along with attorneys Marcus W. Williams and Marvin Schiller. Jackson and Thornburg finished first and second, respectively, in the July primary, thereby qualifying them to compete in the general election.

North Carolina Court of Appeals Judge (Seat 6) primary election, 2004
Party	Candidate	Votes	%
Nonpartisan	Barbara Jackson	240,110	36.69%
Nonpartisan	Alan Thornburg (incumbent)	227,764	34.80%
Nonpartisan	Marcus W. Williams	109,187	16.68%
Nonpartisan	Marvin Schiller	77,412	11.83%
Total votes		654,473	100%

North Carolina Court of Appeals Judge (Seat 6) general election, 2004
Party	Candidate	Votes	%
Nonpartisan	Barbara Jackson	1,399,528	55.07%
Nonpartisan	Alan Thornburg (incumbent)	1,141,896	44.93%
Total votes		2,541,424	100%
