= 2012 North Carolina judicial elections =

2012 North Carolina Supreme Court election
- November 6, 2012

1 seats of the Supreme Court of North Carolina
	Majority party	Minority party
Party	Republican	Democratic
Last election	4	3
Seats won	1	0
Seats after	4	3
Seat change	Steady	Steady

One justice of the North Carolina Supreme Court and three judges of the North Carolina Court of Appeals were elected by North Carolina voters on November 6, 2012, concurrently with the elections for President, U.S. House, Governor, Council of State, State Senate, State House, and other offices. North Carolina judicial elections are non-partisan. Terms for seats on each court are eight years. In three of the four races, incumbents were re-elected to their seats, but incumbent Court of Appeals Judge Cressie Thigpen (who had never been elected but rather was appointed to fill a vacancy on the court) was defeated by Chris Dillon.

== Supreme Court (Seat 2) ==
2012 North Carolina Supreme Court Associate Justice election
- November 6, 2012

Candidate	Paul Martin Newby	Sam Ervin IV
Popular vote	1,821,562	1,688,463
Percentage	51.90%	48.10%
Associate Justice before election
Paul Martin Newby
Elected Associate Justice
Paul Martin Newby

Associate Justice Paul Martin Newby ran for re-election for a second 8-year term. North Carolina Court of Appeals Judge Sam Ervin IV challenged Newby in the general election.

Justice at Stake estimated that total spending by Newby, Ervin, and outside groups in this contest surpassed $4.4 million, breaking North Carolina records for spending in judicial elections. One group, Americans for Prosperity, spent $250,000 in support of Newby, more than the group had ever spent on any judicial election.

Poll source	Date(s) administered	Sample size	Margin of error	Paul Newby	Sam Ervin IV	Undecided
Public Policy Polling	October 29–31, 2012	730	± 3.6%	35%	39%	26%
Public Policy Polling	October 12–14, 2012	1,084	± 3.0%	24%	32%	44%
Public Policy Polling	September 27–30, 2012	1,084	± 3.0%	23%	31%	46%

Paul Martin Newby

Federal officials

- Virginia Foxx, U.S. Representative for North Carolina's 5th congressional district

Political parties

- North Carolina Republican Party

Organizations

- North Carolina Chamber of Commerce
- NC Defense Fund
- NC Federation of Independent Businesses
Sam Ervin IV

Political parties

- North Carolina Democratic Party

Organizations

- Equality North Carolina
- NC Association of Educators
- NC Association of Women Attorneys
- NC Police Benevolent Association
- NC Sierra Club
- NC Troopers Association

North Carolina Supreme Court Associate Justice (Seat 2) general election, 2012
Party	Candidate	Votes	%
Nonpartisan	Paul Martin Newby (incumbent)	1,821,562	51.90%
Nonpartisan	Sam Ervin IV	1,688,463	48.10%
Total votes		3,510,025	100%

== Court of Appeals (Seat 4) ==
Judge Linda McGee ran for re-election to a third full term. She was challenged by attorney David S. Robinson. McGee won re-election with 61.2 percent of the vote.

North Carolina Court of Appeals Judge (Seat 4) general election, 2012
Party	Candidate	Votes	%
Nonpartisan	Linda McGee (incumbent)	2,097,791	61.19%
Nonpartisan	David S. Robinson	1,330,260	38.81%
Total votes		3,428,051	100%

== Court of Appeals (Seat 5) ==
Judge Wanda Bryant was the incumbent and ran for re-election. She was challenged by District Court Judge Marty McGee. Bryant won re-election with 56.5 percent of the vote.

North Carolina Court of Appeals Judge (Seat 5) general election, 2012
Party	Candidate	Votes	%
Nonpartisan	Wanda Bryant (incumbent)	1,926,333	56.55%
Nonpartisan	Marty McGee	1,480,232	43.45%
Total votes		3,406,565	100%

== Court of Appeals (Seat 6) ==
Judge Cressie Thigpen, who was appointed to fill the vacancy caused by former Judge Barbara Jackson's election to the Supreme Court, ran for a full term. He was challenged by attorney/bank executive Chris Dillon, who ran for a seat on the Court of Appeals in 2010. Dillon defeated Thigpen and won the seat with 52.8 percent of the vote.

North Carolina Court of Appeals Judge (Seat 6) general election, 2012
Party	Candidate	Votes	%
Nonpartisan	Chris Dillon	1,779,906	52.74%
Nonpartisan	Cressie Thigpen (incumbent)	1,594,799	47.26%
Total votes		3,374,705	100%
