= Charles D. Walton =

American politician from Rhode Island (born 1948)

Member of the Rhode Island Senate
- In office 1983–2002
- Succeeded by: Juan Pichardo

Personal details
- Born: Charles Dee Watson; July 13, 1948 (age 78) Raleigh, North Carolina, US
- Party: Democratic
- Spouse: Anita Earls (m. 2009)
- Education: Shaw University (BA), University of Massachusetts Amherst (PhD)
- Occupation: Politician, academic administrator

Charles Dee Walton (born 1948) is an American retired politician and higher education administrator. He was the first African American elected to the Rhode Island Senate, serving from 1983 through 2002 as a Democrat representing South Providence. Walton was also the first African-American Rhode Island Senate president pro tempore. He later served as an associate dean at the Community College of Rhode Island.

== Early life and education ==
Born in Raleigh, North Carolina, on July 13, 1948, Charles Dee Walton was raised in Washington, D.C. He received his bachelor's degree from Shaw University in 1971 and his PhD in educational administration from the University of Massachusetts Amherst in 1974. He moved to Rhode Island in the mid-1970s for a position at Roger Williams University and then became director of the Urban Education Center in Providence. He also became active in the National Urban League and NAACP, which during the early 1980s sued the state over racially gerrymandered Rhode Island Senate districts and prevailed in federal court.

== Political career ==
Redistricting paved the way for Walton to win election on June 21, 1983, as Rhode Island's first African-American state senator. He served four years as the first Black president pro tempore of the Rhode Island Senate, as Senior Deputy Majority Leader in 1997–1998, and on the Judiciary Committee and the Committee on Special Legislation. He introduced the Community Reinvestment Act, which banned the practice of redlining by banks, and enacted legislation to establish a minority health program under the Rhode Island Department of Health. He also helped lead a successful movement for the State of Rhode Island to divest from apartheid South Africa.

After nearly twenty years in the senate, Walton lost the June 2002 Democratic primary election after legislative redistricting split South Providence into separate districts and removed many African-American voters from Walton's district while adding numerous Latino voters. Walton was unseated in the primary by Juan Pichardo, who went on to win the general election and become Rhode Island's first Latino state senator. Civil rights organizations sued in May 2002, arguing that the redistricting violated the right of Black voters to select candidates of their choice, but the election went ahead anyway. Senate leaders negotiated with the plaintiffs to redraw district lines, leading to the 2004 election of Harold Metts, a Black man, as well as Pichardo's reelection.

== Life after politics ==
After leaving office at the end of 2002, Walton worked as associate dean for the Office of College Opportunity and Support Programs at the Community College of Rhode Island. He helped to establish the community college's Providence campus. He received an honorary doctor of laws degree from the University of Rhode Island in May 2009. He has served on numerous boards and committees, including the Rhode Island Public Transit Authority, Rhode Island Adult Education Commission, Rhode Island Black Heritage Society, Washington Park Citizens Association, NAACP, and National Organization for Women. Walton lives in Durham, North Carolina, and is married to Anita Earls, Associate Justice of the North Carolina Supreme Court, since 2009.
