= Franklin Freeman =

American judge

Associate Justice of the North Carolina Supreme Court
- In office September 2, 1999 – January 1, 2001
- Appointed by: Jim Hunt
- Preceded by: Henry Frye
- Succeeded by: Robert Edmunds Jr.

Personal details
- Born: Franklin Edward Freeman Jr. 1945 (age 80–81) Surry County, North Carolina
- Party: Democratic
- Education: University of North Carolina School of Law
- Occupation: Attorney

Franklin Edward Freeman Jr. (born 1945) is an American lawyer and public official in North Carolina, who retired from government service in 2009 as Senior Assistant for Governmental Affairs to Governor Mike Easley. He worked for Easley during the entirety of his two terms (2001–2009).

Freeman, a native of Surry County, North Carolina, graduated from the University of North Carolina Law School and clerked for state Supreme Court Justice Dan K. Moore. Between 1971 and 1993, Freeman worked as a prosecutor and as an official at the North Carolina Administrative Office of the Courts. In 1992, Freeman was defeated in the Democratic Primary by Ralph Campbell in his bid to be State Auditor. Campbell became the first African-American to hold a statewide elected executive office in North Carolina.

Freeman became a close advisor to former state Governor Jim Hunt and served as Secretary of the state Department of Correction during Hunt's 1993-1997 term. He then became Hunt's chief of staff and legislative counsel.

Hunt later appointed Freeman to fill a vacancy on the North Carolina Supreme Court, but Freeman was defeated in a bid to be elected to a full term on the Court in 2000 by Justice Robert Edmunds Jr. Under Gov. Easley, Freeman assumed a role similar to his post under Hunt. As of 2009, Freeman was a partner in the McGuireWoods law firm and vice president of McGuireWoods Consulting.

== Electoral history ==
=== 2000 ===
North Carolina Supreme Court Associate Justice (Freeman seat) election, 2000
Party	Candidate	Votes	%
Republican	Robert Edmunds Jr.	1,436,510	51.95%
Democratic	Franklin Freeman (incumbent)	1,328,623	48.05%
Total votes		2,765,133	100%
Republican gain from Democratic			

Legal offices
Preceded by Henry Frye	Associate Justice of the North Carolina Supreme Court; 1999–2001	Succeeded by Robert Edmunds Jr.
