= Suzanne Reynolds =

American lawyer

- Born: Suzanne Reynolds; July 5, 1949 (age 77); Lexington, North Carolina, United States
- Education: Meredith College (B.A.); University of North Carolina (M.A.); Wake Forest University School of Law (J.D.)
- Title: Dean Emerita & Professor of Law, Wake Forest University School of Law
- Spouse: Robert "Hoppy" Elliot (m. 1978)
- Children: Reynolds Michael Elliot (b.1980); Caroline McDonald Elliot (b.1982); Lillie Mauldin Elliot (b.1987)
- Parent(s): Claude Morris "Chuck" Reynolds Sr. Eugenia "Genie" McDonald
- Relatives: Claude Morris Reyonds Jr. (brother)
- Website: WFU School of Law profile

Suzanne Reynolds (born 1949, in Lexington, North Carolina) is a law professor and dean emerita at Wake Forest University School of Law. She is the first woman to head the school, and was named dean after serving four years as executive associate dean for academic affairs.

Reynolds ran for the North Carolina Supreme Court seat held by incumbent Robert H. Edmunds Jr. in the 2008 election. She lost to Edmunds by a narrow margin.

Reynolds graduated with a bachelor's degree from Meredith College in 1971, with an M.A. degree from UNC-Chapel Hill in 1976, and with a J.D. from Wake Forest University School of Law in 1977. From her law school graduation until she accepted a position at WFU, Reynolds worked at the Greensboro law firm of Smith Moore Smith Schell & Hunter. In 1978, she married Robert M. "Hoppy" Elliot, also an attorney.

Reynolds won the North Carolina Governor's Distinguished Woman of the Year award for Education in 1998, the Gwyneth B. Davis Award for Public Service from the North Carolina Association of Women Attorneys in 1996, and the Joseph Branch Teaching Excellence award from Wake Forest Law School in 1994. Her publications include the three-volume treatise, Lee's North Carolina Family Law.
