= Chris Dillon =

American judge

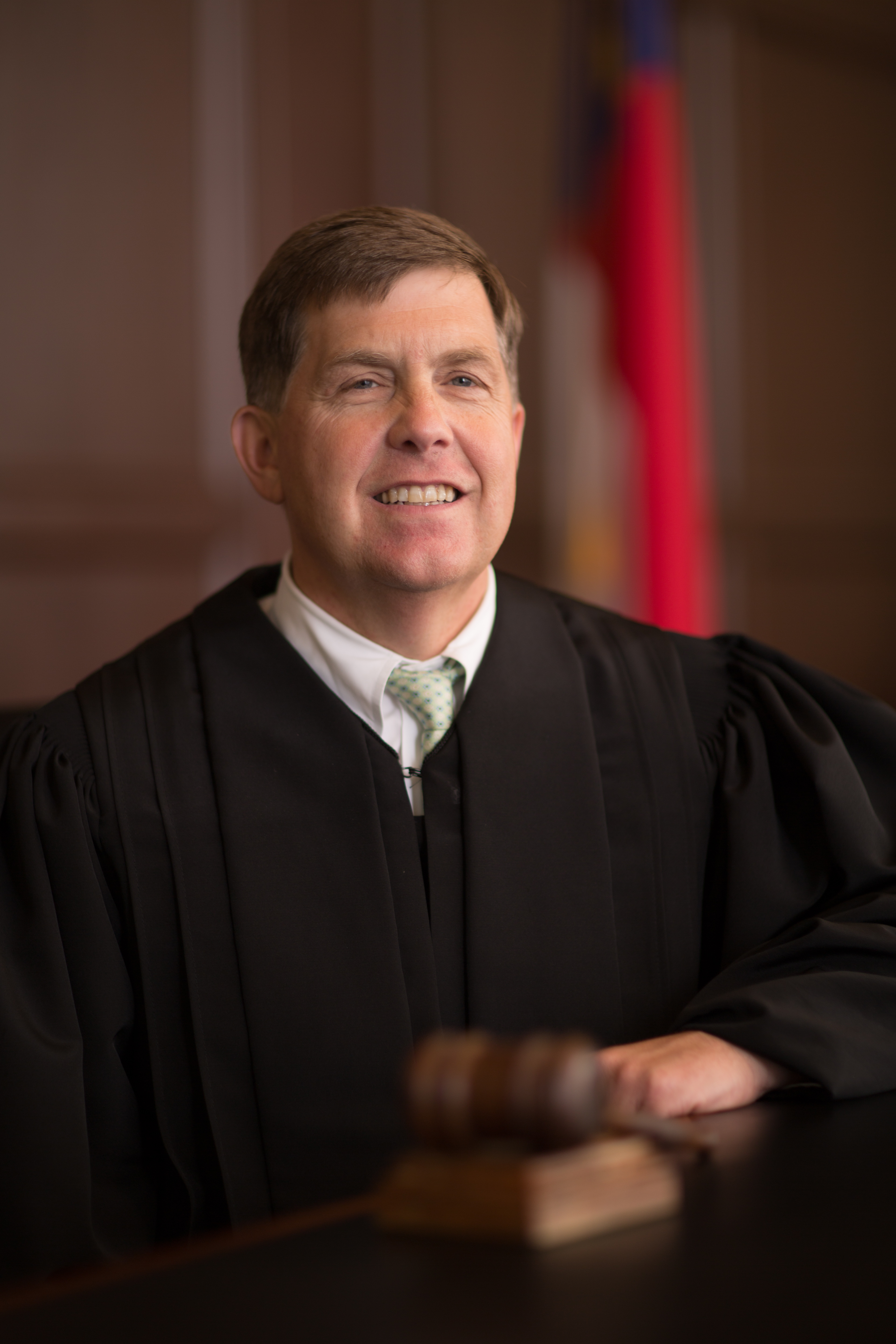
- Judge Dillon at the NC Court of Appeals in Raleigh, NC.

Chief Judge of the North Carolina Court of Appeals
- Incumbent
- Assumed office January 1, 2024
- Appointed by: Paul Martin Newby
- Preceded by: Donna Stroud

Judge of the North Carolina Court of Appeals
- Incumbent
- Assumed office January 1, 2013
- Preceded by: Cressie Thigpen

Personal details
- Born: Robert Christopher Dillon; 1965 (age 60–61) Raleigh, North Carolina
- Party: Republican
- Spouse: Ann Finley
- Children: 5
- Education: Needham Broughton High School; University of North Carolina at Chapel Hill (BS, JD)

Robert Christopher "Chris" Dillon (born 1965) is a North Carolina attorney and chief judge of the North Carolina Court of Appeals. Dillon won election to the appellate court in a statewide race on Nov. 6, 2012, when he defeated incumbent Cressie Thigpen. Dillon won re-election on Nov. 3, 2020 over challenger Gray Styers.

== Early life and education ==
Chris Dillon was born and raised in Raleigh, North Carolina, the youngest of C.A. and Mildred Dillon's five children. He attended public schools throughout his childhood, graduating from Needham Broughton High School. Dillon earned his B.S. in Business Administration and his Juris Doctor degree from the University of North Carolina at Chapel Hill. In 2018, Dillon graduated from Duke University with an LL.M. degree.

== Family ==
Judge Dillon is married to Ann (née Finley), a special education teacher with whom he has had five children: Sally, Matt, Anna, Molly, and Sam.

== Career ==
Following law school, Judge Dillon practiced law at Young Moore Henderson in Raleigh, focusing on administrative, business, and real estate law.

Judge Dillon has been licensed by the North Carolina Real Estate Commission as a broker for over twenty years and has worked as a commercial real estate broker where he created and managed a number of investment real estate entities.

In 2006, Judge Dillon helped start CapStone Bank, a community bank, where he served as a Senior Vice President. In 2011, he returned to private practice, representing a number of small business owners, professionals, and a state occupational licensing board.

In 2012, Judge Dillon was elected to an eight-year term on the North Carolina Court of Appeals. Judge Dillon has been an adjunct professor, teaching real estate focused courses at both UNC School of Law and Norman Adrian Wiggins School of Law of Campbell University. In 2018, Judge Dillon was awarded his LLM degree from the Duke University School of Law in the field of Judicial Studies.

Throughout his career, Judge Dillon has served on a number of civic boards and committees, including DHIC, Inc. (formerly Downtown Housing Improvement Corporation), the North Carolina Bar Association, and the Friends of the NC Museum of Natural Sciences. He has taught youth Sunday School at Edenton Street United Methodist Church since 1990.

In 2020, Judge Dillon was re-elected to another eight-year term on the North Carolina Court of Appeals. Following his re-election, he was appointed to serve as Chair of the North Carolina Judicial Standards Commission

== Electoral history ==
=== 2020 ===
North Carolina Court of Appeals (Seat 6) election, 2020
Party	Candidate	Votes	%
Republican	Chris Dillon (incumbent)	2,769,020	51.95%
Democratic	Gray Styers	2,561,090	48.05%
Total votes		5,330,110	100%
Republican hold			

=== 2012 ===
North Carolina Court of Appeals (Thigpen seat) election, 2012
Party	Candidate	Votes	%
Nonpartisan	Chris Dillon	1,779,906	52.74%
Nonpartisan	Cressie Thigpen (incumbent)	1,594,799	47.26%
Total votes		3,374,705	100%

=== 2010 ===
North Carolina Court of Appeals (Wynn seat) election, 2010
Party	Candidate	Votes	%
Nonpartisan	Cressie Thigpen (incumbent)	395,220	20.33%
Nonpartisan	Douglas McCullough	295,619	15.21%
Nonpartisan	Chris Dillon	201,870	10.39%
Nonpartisan	Anne Middleton	174,556	8.98%
Nonpartisan	Daniel E. Garner	153,971	7.92%
Nonpartisan	Jewel Ann Farlow	151,747	7.81%
Nonpartisan	Harry Payne	99,257	5.11%
Nonpartisan	Stan Hammer	96,451	4.96%
Nonpartisan	Mark E. Klass	90,526	4.66%
Nonpartisan	Pamela M. Vesper	90,116	4.64%
Nonpartisan	John F. Bloss	78,857	4.06%
Nonpartisan	John Sullivan	69,971	3.60%
Nonpartisan	J. Wesley Casteen	45,610	2.35%
Total votes		1,943,771	100%

Legal offices
Preceded by Cressie Thigpen	Judge of the North Carolina Court of Appeals; 2013–Present	Incumbent
Preceded by Donna Stroud	Chief Judge of the North Carolina Court of Appeals; 2024–Present	Incumbent
