= 1980 North Carolina gubernatorial election =

- November 4, 1980
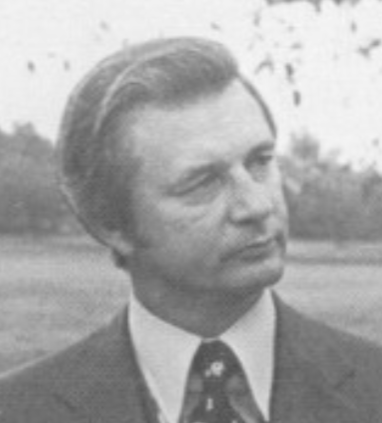

Nominee	Jim Hunt	I. Beverly Lake
Party	Democratic	Republican
Popular vote	1,143,145	691,449
Percentage	61.88%	37.43%
- County results Hunt: 50–60% 60–70% 70–80% 80–90% Lake: 50–60% 60–70%
Governor before election
Jim Hunt
Democratic
Elected Governor
Jim Hunt
Democratic

The 1980 North Carolina gubernatorial election was held on November 4, 1980. Despite North Carolina going to Ronald Reagan in the presidential race and the U.S. Senate race being won by a Republican (John P. East), popular Democratic Governor Jim Hunt won a second term in office in a landslide over Republican I. Beverly Lake. Hunt thus became the first governor of the state elected to a consecutive four-year term, following an amendment to the Constitution of North Carolina allowing such a run.

Hunt's decision to run for a second term led to a challenge from former Democratic governor Robert W. Scott, but Hunt easily defeated the former governor in the Democratic primary.

UNC-Chapel Hill journalism professor Ferrel Guillory wrote of this campaign: "Hunt campaigned as the activist governor that he had been through his first term. His campaign’s key points were: 1) limiting government growth even as he deployed government as a tool for improving citizens’ lives, particularly through education initiatives; 2) maintaining ties with the business community while also pushing to diversify the state’s economy; 3) expanding rights and opportunities for women and black people; and 4) responding to charges that he was a “big spender’’ by noting that he had persuaded the Legislature in 1979 to enact a modest income tax cut."

== General election results ==
1980 NC Governor Election Results
Party	Candidate	Votes	%	±%
Democratic	Jim Hunt (Incumbent)	1,143,145	61.88%	
Republican	I. Beverly Lake	691,449	37.43%	−16.47%
Libertarian	Robert Y. Emory	9,552	0.54%	
Socialist Workers	Douglas A. Cooper	2,887	0.16%	
Independent	Others	53	0%	
Turnout		1,847,086	100%	
