= Mark Martin (judge) =

American judge (born 1963)

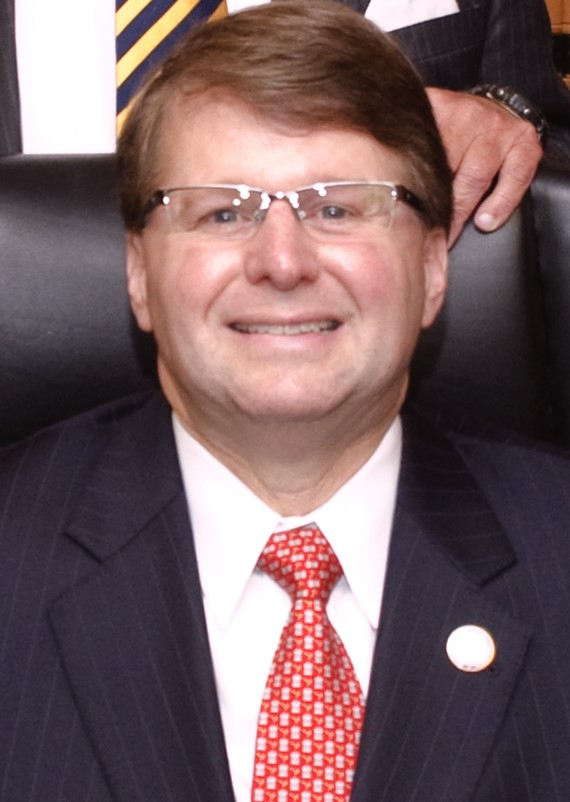
- Martin in 2015

Chief Justice of the North Carolina Supreme Court
- In office September 1, 2014 – February 28, 2019
- Appointed by: Pat McCrory
- Preceded by: Sarah Parker
- Succeeded by: Cheri Beasley

Associate Justice of the North Carolina Supreme Court
- In office January 1, 1999 – September 1, 2014
- Preceded by: Willis Whichard
- Succeeded by: Robert N. Hunter Jr.

Personal details
- Born: Mark Dean Martin; April 29, 1963 (age 63) Brussels, Belgium
- Party: Republican
- Education: Western Carolina University (BA); University of North Carolina, Chapel Hill (JD); University of Virginia (LLM)

Mark Dean Martin (born April 29, 1963) is an American jurist who served as the chief justice of the Supreme Court of North Carolina from 2014 through 2019. He was appointed by North Carolina Governor Pat McCrory to become Chief Justice on September 1, 2014 upon the retirement of Sarah Parker. Martin was already running for the seat in the 2014 general election.

Prior to his tenure at the North Carolina Supreme Court, Martin also served on the North Carolina Court of Appeals, and the North Carolina Superior Court. At the time of his installation in 1999, he was the youngest Supreme Court Justice in North Carolina history. He was also the youngest person ever elected to the North Carolina Court of Appeals.

== Education ==
Martin was born in Brussels, where his father, who served in the United States Air Force, was assigned to the U.S. Embassy. Martin received his J.D. degree, with honors, at the University of North Carolina School of Law and received a B.S. degree, summa cum laude, from Western Carolina University. He also has a Master of Laws (LL.M.) Degree in Judicial Process from the University of Virginia. During law school, Martin served as Editor-in-Chief of the North Carolina Journal of International Law & Commercial Regulation and was inducted into the Davis Society.

== Career ==
After graduating from law school, Martin served as a judicial law clerk to United States District Judge Clyde H. Hamilton. Following his clerkship, Martin practiced law at the McNair Law Firm in Raleigh, North Carolina. He then served as Legal Counsel to James G. Martin, the Governor of North Carolina, until his appointment in 1992 as Resident Superior Court Judge in Pitt County, North Carolina. From 1994 to 1999, Martin served as a Judge on the North Carolina Court of Appeals. He began serving as an associate justice of the Supreme Court of North Carolina in January 1999 and became the Senior Associate Justice in February 2006. He became re-elected to an eight-year term in November 2006.

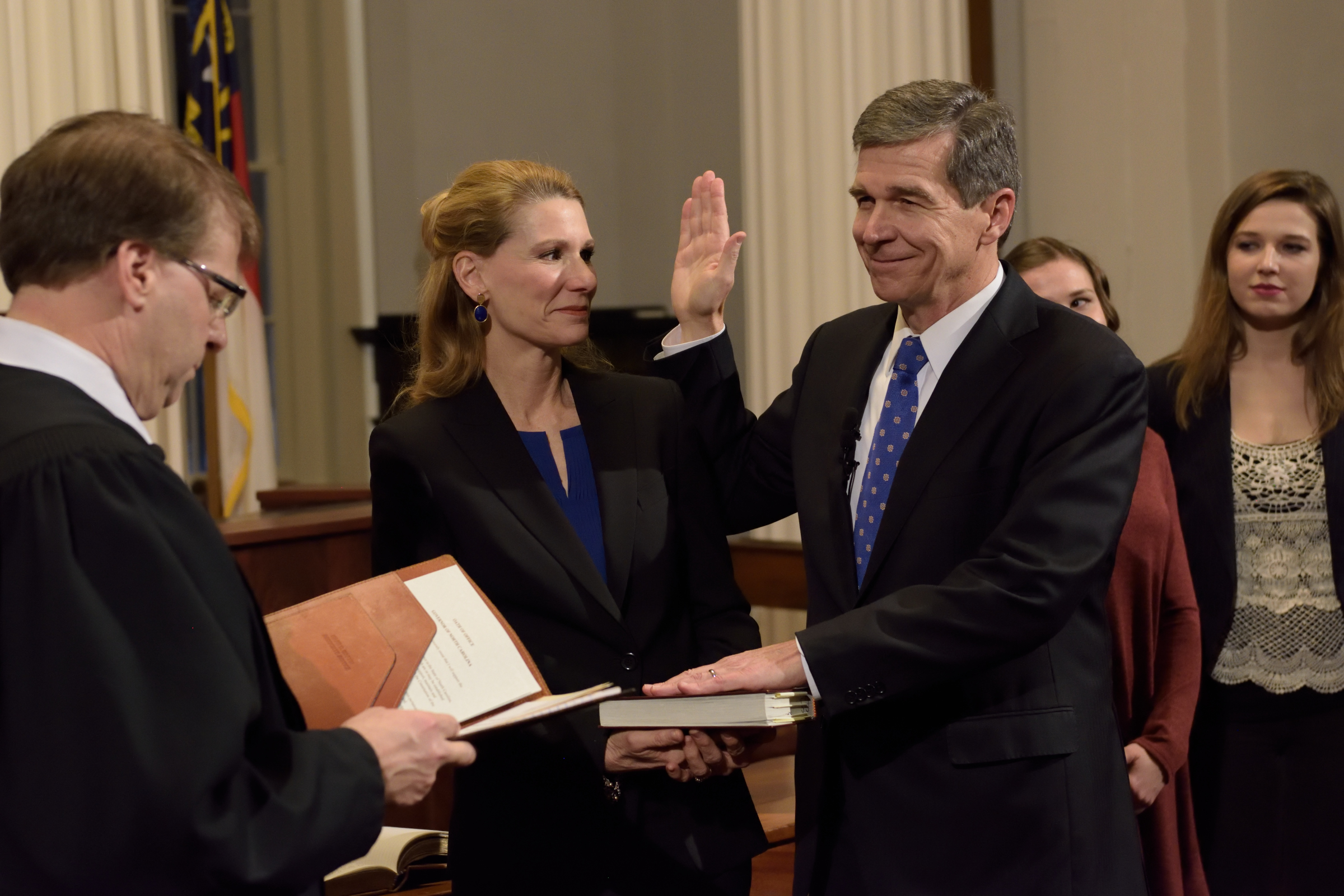
Martin administering the oath of office to Governor Roy Cooper, 2017

In August 2014, North Carolina Governor Pat McCrory announced he would appoint Justice Martin as Chief Justice of the State Supreme Court. The appointment came as former Chief Justice Sarah Parker reached the state's mandatory retirement age of 72. Martin then won his bid for a full term as chief justice on November 4, 2014.

Martin has served on the adjunct faculty at Duke University School of Law, University of North Carolina School of Law, and North Carolina Central University School of Law.

On January 25, 2019, Martin announced that he would retire from the North Carolina Supreme Court in February 2019. Governor Roy Cooper appointed Associate Justice Cheri Beasley as Martin’s successor. Martin took on a new role as Dean of the Regent University School of Law in Virginia Beach, Virginia, with this role becoming effective on March 1, 2019. In 2022, it was announced that he would be leaving Regent University to become the founding Dean of a new law school at High Point University.

In early January 2021, it was reported that Martin had participated in the attempts to overturn the 2020 presidential election during President Donald Trump's last efforts to stay in power before the certification of Joe Biden's Electoral College victory by telling the President that Vice President Mike Pence had the constitutional authority to block the certification by rejecting the Electoral College votes from multiple states. Pence ultimately did not accept Martin's argument, instead certifying Biden as the winner of the election. In October 2024, The Intercept reported that Martin was also involved in helping to develop a lawsuit, based on the independent state legislature theory that each state legislature has absolute authority to choose presidential electors regardless of a state's laws or constitution, that Republican state attorneys could file directly to the US Supreme Court. In December 2020, Texas Attorney General Ken Paxton filed the suit, Texas v. Pennsylvania, which the Supreme Court declined to hear.

== Professional involvement ==
Martin has served on a number of entities within the American Bar Association (ABA), including the Advisory Commission to the World Justice Project, the Executive Committee of the Appellate Judges Conference, the Coalition for Justice, the Commission on State Court Funding, the John Marshall Award Review Committee, and The Judges’ Journal Editorial Board. He served as Chair of the ABA Judicial Division Program Committee in 2007-08. Martin has also been active within the Appellate Judges Education Institute (AJEI), serving as both a member and Chair of the Program Planning Committee. He was elected chair of the ABA Judicial Division in 2013. Martin is a recipient of the Order of the Long Leaf Pine, North Carolina's highest civilian award.

Legal offices
Preceded by Willis Whichard	Associate Justice of the North Carolina Supreme Court; 1999–2014	Succeeded by Sam J. Ervin IV
Preceded by Sarah Parker	Chief Justice of the North Carolina Supreme Court; 2014–2019	Succeeded by Cheri Beasley
