= John S. Arrowood =

American attorney and judge

John Arrowood

Judge of the North Carolina Court of Appeals
- Incumbent
- Assumed office April 24, 2017
- Appointed by: Roy Cooper
- Preceded by: Douglas McCullough
- In office September 7, 2007 – December 31, 2008
- Appointed by: Mike Easley
- Preceded by: Eric L. Levinson
- Succeeded by: Robert N. Hunter Jr.

Personal details
- Born: November 4, 1956 (age 69) Burnsville, North Carolina, U.S.
- Party: Democratic
- Education: Catawba College (BA); University of North Carolina, Chapel Hill (JD)

John S. Arrowood (born November 4, 1956) is an American attorney and judge. In April 2017, Arrowood was appointed to the North Carolina Court of Appeals by Governor Roy Cooper, to replace Judge Douglas McCullough, a Republican who resigned one month before he would have reached the mandatory retirement age.

He was elected to a full term on the court in 2018, becoming the first openly gay person elected to a statewide office in North Carolina.

Previously, in August 2007, he was appointed to the North Carolina Court of Appeals by Governor Mike Easley, replacing Judge Eric L. Levinson, who had resigned to accept a federal appointment. Arrowood was defeated in the subsequent 2008 election.

== Biography ==
Born in Burnsville, North Carolina, Arrowood moved to Caldwell County after the death of his parents. He graduated from Hudson High School in 1975. Arrowood graduated magna cum laude from Catawba College in 1979 and received his J.D. degree at the University of North Carolina at Chapel Hill School of Law in 1982. He worked on the Court of Appeals staff and then practiced law for many years in Charlotte, North Carolina before serving as a state superior court judge from March through August 2007. Arrowood has been a member of the board of the North Carolina Railroad, the N.C. Banking Commission, the N.C. Rules Review Commission, and the N.C. Arts Council.

Since Arrowood was appointed to fill an unexpired term, his seat was on the ballot in 2008. He was defeated for a full term by Robert N. Hunter Jr.

He was also an unsuccessful candidate for the Court of Appeals in 2014, seeking the seat made vacant by the retirement of Judge John C. Martin. Arrowood came in second out of 19 candidates.

Arrowood is openly gay and was the first openly LGBT judge on the North Carolina Court of Appeals.

== Electoral history ==
=== 2018 ===
North Carolina Court of Appeals (Seat 1) election, 2018
Party	Candidate	Votes	%
Democratic	John S. Arrowood (incumbent)	1,855,728	50.79%
Republican	Andrew Heath	1,797,929	49.21%
Total votes		3,653,657	100%
Democratic hold			

=== 2014 ===
North Carolina Court of Appeals (Martin seat) election, 2014
Party	Candidate	Votes	%
Nonpartisan	John M. Tyson	557,700	23.84%
Nonpartisan	John S. Arrowood	336,839	14.40%
Nonpartisan	Keischa Lovelace	226,159	9.67%
Nonpartisan	Marion Warren	143,279	6.13%
Nonpartisan	Elizabeth Davenport Scott	131,330	5.61%
Nonpartisan	Marty Martin	120,281	5.14%
Nonpartisan	Hunter Murphy	103,361	4.42%
Nonpartisan	Ann Kirby	96,468	4.12%
Nonpartisan	Valerie Zachary	92,361	3.95%
Nonpartisan	Lori G. Christian	88,819	3.80%
Nonpartisan	Tricia Shields	79,357	3.39%
Nonpartisan	Daniel Patrick Donahue	66,168	2.83%
Nonpartisan	Abe Jones	59,712	2.55%
Nonpartisan	Chuck Winfree	52,978	2.26%
Nonpartisan	Jeffrey M. Cook	48,336	2.07%
Nonpartisan	Jody Newsome	38,544	1.65%
Nonpartisan	Betsy Bunting	36,163	1.55%
Nonpartisan	Sabra Jean Faires	31,759	1.36%
Nonpartisan	J. Brad Donovan	29,580	1.26%
Total votes		2,339,194	100%

=== 2008 ===
North Carolina Court of Appeals (Arrowood seat) election, 2008
Party	Candidate	Votes	%
Nonpartisan	Robert N. Hunter Jr.	1,544,825	53.70%
Nonpartisan	John S. Arrowood (incumbent)	1,332,107	46.30%
Total votes		2,876,932	100%

== See also ==
- List of LGBT jurists in the United States
