= Robert H. Edmunds Jr. =

American judge

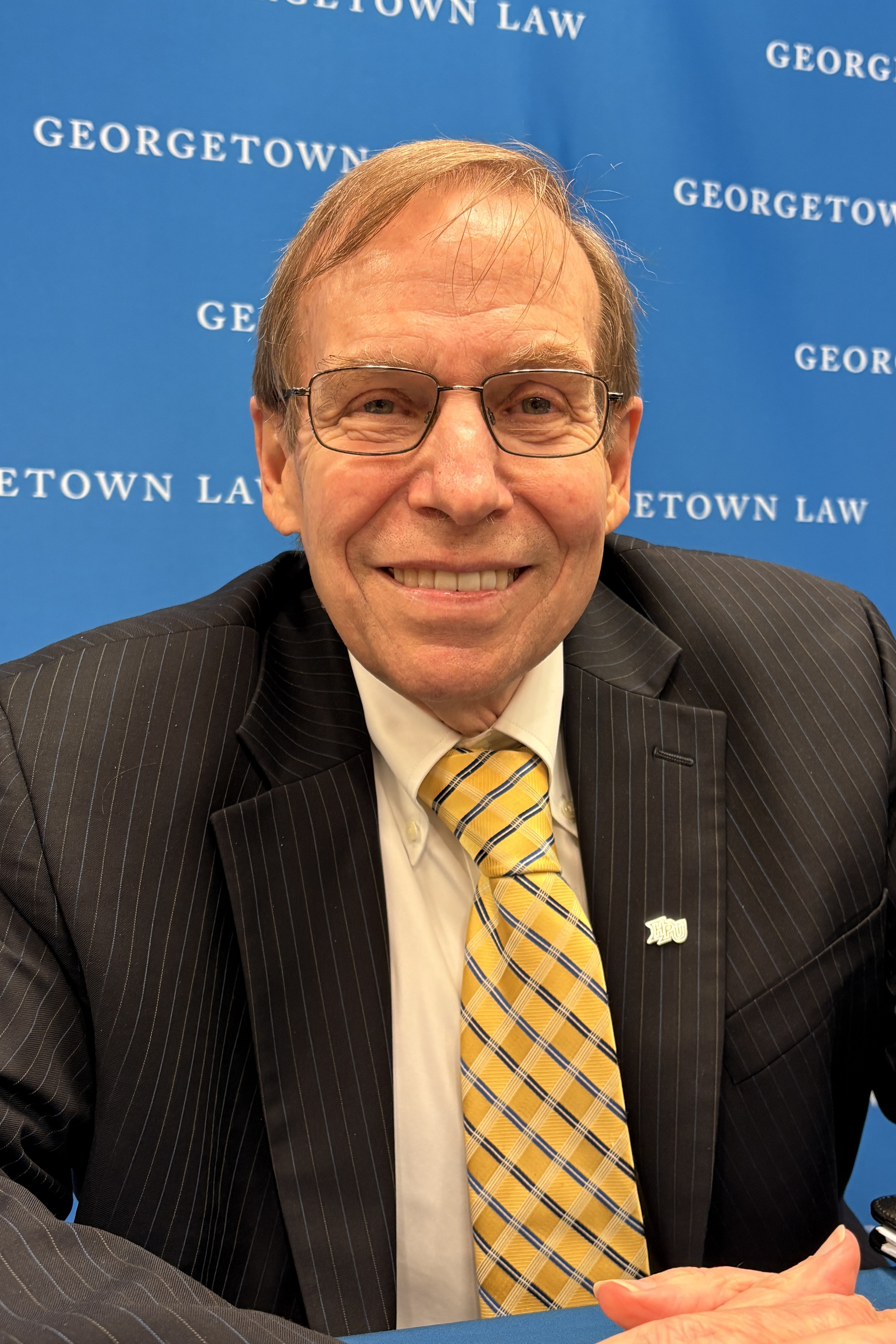

Associate Justice of the North Carolina Supreme Court
- In office January 1, 2001 – January 1, 2017
- Preceded by: Franklin Freeman
- Succeeded by: Michael Morgan

Judge of the North Carolina Court of Appeals
- In office January 1, 1999 – January 1, 2001
- Preceded by: Clarence Horton Jr.
- Succeeded by: Wanda Bryant

United States Attorney for the Middle District of North Carolina
- In office December 1986 – April 1993
- President: Ronald Reagan; George H. W. Bush; Bill Clinton
- Preceded by: Kenneth W. McAllister
- Succeeded by: Benjamin H. White Jr.

Personal details
- Born: Robert Holt Edmunds Jr. April 17, 1949 (age 77) Danville, Virginia, U.S.
- Party: Republican
- Education: Vassar College (AB); University of North Carolina at Chapel Hill (JD); University of Virginia (LLM)

Robert Holt Edmunds Jr. (born April 17, 1949) is an American lawyer who served as an Associate Justice of the North Carolina Supreme Court from 2001 to 2017, immediately following a two-year term on the North Carolina Court of Appeals.

== Early life and education ==
Born in Danville, Virginia, Edmunds moved to Greensboro, North Carolina at the age of 8. He attended Woodberry Forest School and Williams College before graduating with honors from Vassar College with a degree in English. Edmunds earned his Juris Doctor degree from the University of North Carolina at Chapel Hill in 1975, after which he served two years in the United States Navy. He was awarded an LL.M. degree (Master of Laws in the Judicial Process) from the University of Virginia School of Law in Charlottesville in 2004.

== Career ==
After working as a district attorney in Guilford County, North Carolina and as an Assistant United States Attorney for the Middle District of North Carolina, Edmunds served as the presidentially-appointed United States Attorney for the Middle District of North Carolina from 1986 to 1993. In 1993, Edmunds entered private practice, joining the firm Stern & Klepfer. In 1996, he ran for North Carolina Attorney General but lost to Mike Easley. He was elected to the North Carolina Court of Appeals in 1998 as a Republican. In 2000, he was elected to the North Carolina Supreme Court, defeating Franklin Freeman. He was elected as a Republican, though the office became nonpartisan.

Justice Edmunds won a second term to the North Carolina Supreme Court by defeating Wake Forest University law professor Suzanne Reynolds in the 2008 elections. In 2016 when running for a third term he was defeated by Michael Morgan.

== Electoral history ==
=== 2016 ===
North Carolina Supreme Court Associate Justice (Edmunds seat) primary election, 2016
Party	Candidate	Votes	%
Nonpartisan	Robert Edmunds Jr. (incumbent)	235,405	48.01%
Nonpartisan	Michael Morgan	168,498	34.36%
Nonpartisan	Sabra Jean Faires	59,040	12.04%
Nonpartisan	Daniel Robertson	27,401	5.59%
Total votes		490,344	100%

North Carolina Supreme Court Associate Justice (Edmunds seat) general election, 2016
Party	Candidate	Votes	%
Nonpartisan	Michael Morgan	2,157,927	54.47%
Nonpartisan	Robert Edmunds Jr. (incumbent)	1,803,425	45.53%
Total votes		3,961,352	100%

=== 2008 ===
North Carolina Supreme Court Associate Justice (Edmunds seat) election, 2008
Party	Candidate	Votes	%
Nonpartisan	Robert Edmunds Jr. (incumbent)	1,577,419	51.00%
Nonpartisan	Suzanne Reynolds	1,515,345	49.00%
Total votes		3,092,764	100%

=== 2000 ===
North Carolina Supreme Court Associate Justice (Freeman seat) election, 2000
Party	Candidate	Votes	%
Republican	Robert Edmunds Jr.	1,436,510	51.95%
Democratic	Franklin Freeman (incumbent)	1,328,623	48.05%
Total votes		2,765,133	100%
Republican gain from Democratic			

=== 1998 ===
1998 North Carolina Court of Appeals (Horton Seat) election, 1998
Party	Candidate	Votes	%
Republican	Robert Edmunds Jr.	949,110	51.59%
Democratic	Clarence Horton Jr. (incumbent)	890,533	48.41%
Total votes		1,839,643	100%
Republican gain from Democratic			

=== 1996 ===
1996 North Carolina Attorney General election
Party	Candidate	Votes	%
Democratic	Mike Easley (incumbent)	1,453,196	59.07%
Republican	Robert Edmunds Jr.	1,007,027	40.93%
Total votes		2,460,223	100%
Democratic hold			

Party political offices
Preceded by Bob Crumley	Republican nominee for Attorney General of North Carolina; 1996	Succeeded by Dan Boyce
Legal offices
Preceded by Clarence Horton Jr.	Judge of the North Carolina Court of Appeals; 1999–2001	Succeeded by
Preceded by Franklin Freeman	Associate Justice of the North Carolina Supreme Court; 2001–2017	Succeeded by Michael Morgan
