= Robert N. Hunter Jr. =

American judge from North Carolina

Robert Hunter Jr.
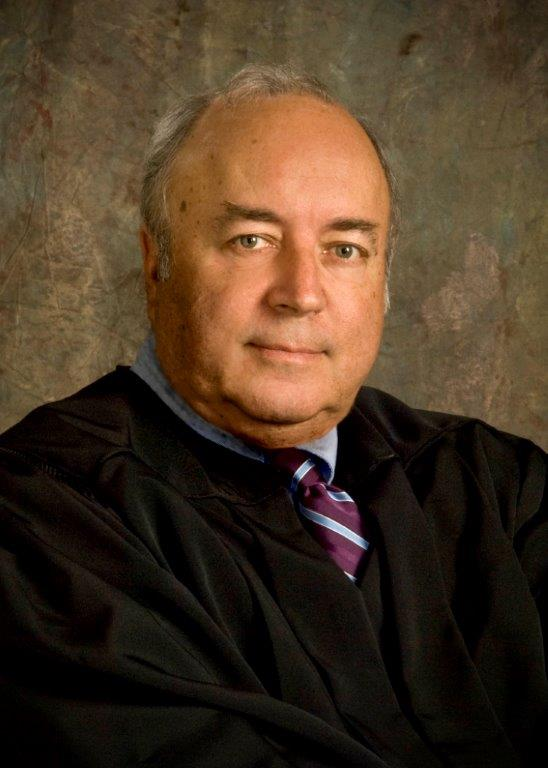

Associate Justice of the North Carolina Supreme Court
- In office September 6, 2014 – January 1, 2015
- Appointed by: Pat McCrory
- Preceded by: Mark Martin
- Succeeded by: Sam J. Ervin IV

Judge of the North Carolina Court of Appeals
- In office January 1, 2015 – April 1, 2019
- Appointed by: Pat McCrory
- Preceded by: Sam J. Ervin IV
- Succeeded by: Christopher Brook
- In office January 1, 2009 – September 6, 2014
- Preceded by: John S. Arrowood
- Succeeded by: Richard Dietz

Personal details
- Born: March 30, 1947 (age 79)
- Party: Republican
- Education: University of North Carolina at Chapel Hill

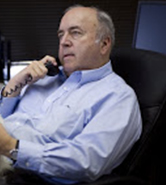
Judge Robert N. Hunter, Jr. (NC Court of Appeals and Supreme Court candidate) in office

Robert Neal "Bob" Hunter, Jr. (born March 30, 1947) is a North Carolina lawyer and retired jurist formerly serving on the North Carolina Court of Appeals and on the North Carolina Supreme Court.

A graduate of the University of North Carolina at Chapel Hill and its law school, Hunter is a former chairman of the state board of elections (1985–1989) and a former deputy Attorney General of North Carolina. He was elected to the Court of Appeals in 2008, defeating incumbent John S. Arrowood and receiving 54% of the statewide vote.

Hunter was a candidate for the North Carolina Supreme Court in 2014. Gov. Pat McCrory appointed Hunter to the Supreme Court, effective Sept. 6, and continuing through December 2014, to fill the vacancy created by Mark Martin's elevation to the position of chief justice. Court of Appeals Judge Sam J. Ervin IV defeated Hunter in the November election for a full term. Gov. McCrory then appointed Hunter to fill Ervin's Court of Appeals seat, effective Jan. 1, 2015.

Hunter has also served as an adjunct professor at North Carolina Central University School of Law, Wake Forest University School of Law, Elon University School of Law, and the University of North Carolina at Greensboro.

Hunter received the McNeill Smith Constitutional Rights and Responsibilities Section Award from the North Carolina Bar Association in 2013.

== Electoral history ==
=== 2016 ===
North Carolina Court of Appeals (Hunter seat) election, 2016
Party	Candidate	Votes	%
Republican	Robert Hunter Jr. (incumbent)	2,403,059	54.37%
Democratic	Abe Jones	2,016,552	45.63%
Total votes		4,419,611	100%
Republican hold			

=== 2014 ===
North Carolina Supreme Court Associate Justice (Martin seat) election, 2014
Party	Candidate	Votes	%
Nonpartisan	Sam J. Ervin IV	1,324,261	52.60%
Nonpartisan	Robert Hunter Jr. (incumbent)	1,193,492	47.40%
Total votes		2,517,753	100%

=== 2008 ===
North Carolina Court of Appeals (Arrowood seat) election, 2008
Party	Candidate	Votes	%
Nonpartisan	Robert Hunter Jr.	1,544,825	53.70%
Nonpartisan	John S. Arrowood (incumbent)	1,332,107	46.30%
Total votes		2,876,932	100%

== See also ==
- Robert C. Hunter, a similarly named fellow judge of North Carolina Court System's Appellate Division

Legal offices
Preceded by John S. Arrowood	Judge of the North Carolina Court of Appeals; 2009–2014	Succeeded by Richard Dietz
Preceded by Sam J. Ervin IV	Judge of the North Carolina Court of Appeals; 2015–2019	Succeeded by Christopher Brook
Preceded by Mark Martin	Associate Justice of the North Carolina Supreme Court; 2014–2015	Succeeded by Sam J. Ervin IV
