= J. Frank Huskins =

American judge

Associate Justice of the North Carolina Supreme Court
- In office 1968 – February 1, 1982
- Succeeded by: Burley Mitchell

Personal details
- Born: February 10, 1911 near Burnsville, North Carolina, U.S.
- Died: November 19, 1995 (aged 84)
- Party: Democratic
- Parent(s): Joseph Irwin Huskins; Mary Etta Peterson Huskins
- Education: University of North Carolina at Chapel Hill (AB)
- Profession: Judge

Military service
- Allegiance: United States
- Branch/service: United States Navy
- Years of service: 1942–1946
- Rank: Lieutenant commander
- Battles/wars: World War II

J. Frank Huskins (February 10, 1911 – November 19, 1995) was an associate justice of the North Carolina Supreme Court from 1968 through 1982.

Huskins was born in the Toledo community near Burnsville, Yancey County, North Carolina to Joseph Irwin Huskins and Mary Etta Peterson Huskins. Huskins attended Mars Hill Junior College from 1927 to 1929. He then earned an A.B. degree from the University of North Carolina at Chapel Hill in 1930 and a degree from its law school in 1932.

He returned to Burnsville, where he was elected mayor in 1939, a position in which he served until he joined the U.S. Navy for World War II. He served from 1942 to 1946 and was honorably discharged as a lieutenant commander. Returning to Burnsville again, Huskins was elected in 1947 to the North Carolina House of Representatives as a Democrat. Governor Kerr Scott appointed him Chairman of the state Industrial Commission, where he served from 1949 until 1955.

He was appointed by Governor Luther Hodges to the North Carolina Superior Court bench in 1955 for the Western Division, which included his home county of Yancey. He served as a Superior Court Judge for ten years. In 1965, he was called upon by Chief Justice Emery Denny to hold a newly created post as Director of the Administrative Office of the Courts. He held this position until 5 February 1968, when Governor Dan K. Moore appointed him to the North Carolina Supreme Court as an associate justice. He was re-elected in 1968 and 1976. On 1 February 1982, he retired from the Court, and Burley Mitchell was appointed to his seat. Judge Huskins entered private practice in Raleigh and argued several cases before the Supreme Court.
