= Alan Z. Thornburg =

American lawyer

Judge of the North Carolina Court of Appeals
- In office February 27, 2004 – December 31, 2004
- Appointed by: Mike Easley
- Preceded by: Sidney S. Eagles Jr.
- Succeeded by: Barbara Jackson

Personal details
- Born: January 10, 1967 (age 58); Sylva, North Carolina, U.S.

Alan Z. Thornburg (born January 10, 1967) is an American lawyer and jurist, formerly a judge on the North Carolina Court of Appeals.

Born in Sylva, North Carolina, Thornburg earned a history degree from Davidson College in 1989 and a Juris Doctor degree from Wake Forest University in 1996. His father, Lacy Thornburg, is a former North Carolina attorney general, state superior court judge, and federal district court judge.

After serving as an aide to U.S. Senator Terry Sanford and working in private practice in Asheville, North Carolina from 1997 to 2004, Thornburg was named to the North Carolina Court of Appeals in 2004. He is married and has two children.

In 2004, Thornburg sought a full eight-year term on the North Carolina Court of Appeals, but was defeated by Barbara Jackson in the statewide judicial elections.

Gov. Mike Easley appointed Thornburg to the North Carolina Board of Transportation in 2005 and then appointed him to a Superior Court judgeship in 2009. He was elected to keep his seat on the superior court bench in the November 2010 election. Thornburg is currently the senior resident superior court judge for Buncombe County.
