= Anita Earls =

American judge (born 1960)

Associate Justice of the North Carolina Supreme Court
- Incumbent
- Assumed office January 3, 2019
- Preceded by: Barbara Jackson

Personal details
- Born: Anita Sue Brooks; February 20, 1960 (age 66) Seattle, Washington, U.S.
- Party: Democratic
- Spouse(s): Jonathan Hodgkiss (m. 1982–2003) Charles D. Walton (m. 2009)
- Education: Williams College (BA); Yale University (JD)

Anita Sue Earls (born Anita Sue Brooks on February 20, 1960) is an American civil rights attorney who has served as an associate justice of the North Carolina Supreme Court since 2019. She previously served as the executive director of the Southern Coalition for Social Justice, as well as a deputy assistant attorney general in the Civil Rights Division of the United States Department of Justice during the Clinton administration. On November 6, 2018, Earls defeated Republican incumbent Justice Barbara Jackson in a three-candidate election to win a seat on the state's highest court.

== Early life and education ==
Earls grew up in Seattle, Washington. Her parents relocated there because Missouri banned interracial marriage (Earls's mother is White and her father is Black). Earls and her brother were both adopted.

Earls is a graduate of Williams College and Yale Law School. She attended Williams College, where she majored in political economy and philosophy. Upon graduation Earls received a Thomas J. Watson Fellowship to study the role of women in Ujamaa villages in Tanzania, but her time abroad was cut short by multiple bouts of malaria. She subsequently moved to England, worked in a solicitor's office, and married her first husband. Three years later she returned to the United States and attended Yale Law.

== Legal career ==
Following her graduation from Yale Law School, in 1988, Earls was hired by James Ferguson II to join Ferguson, Stein, Watt, Wallas, Adkins & Gresham, where she practiced civil rights litigation.

In 1998, Earls was appointed by President Bill Clinton to serve as Deputy Assistant Attorney General in the Civil Rights Division of the U.S. Department of Justice.

After serving as director of the Lawyers' Committee for Civil Rights' voting rights project (2000-2003) and as director of advocacy at the University of North Carolina Center for Civil Rights (2003-2007), in 2007, Earls founded the Southern Coalition For Social Justice (SCSJ) in Durham, NC, a 501(c)(3) nonprofit organization. There, she served as SCSJ's founding executive director, stepping down in 2017 to run for Associate Justice of the North Carolina Supreme Court.

While at SCSJ, Earls represented clients in notable voting rights lawsuits, including serving as lead plaintiffs' attorney in North Carolina v. Covington, a landmark case that the U.S. Supreme Court affirmed in 2017, which resulted in 28 of North Carolina's state house and senate districts being deemed unconstitutional racial gerrymanders. A federal court then ordered a special master to redraw the districts' boundaries for the 2018 election, where, under the new maps, state Democrats broke the legislature's nearly decade-long Republican supermajority.

Earls has taught at Duke University, the University of North Carolina at Chapel Hill, and the University of Maryland.

== Judicial career ==
Following her election as Associate Justice of the Supreme Court of North Carolina, Earls has written numerous opinions of significance on issues such as the North Carolina Racial Justice Act, the maintenance of privacy rights associated with warrantless searches, and media defamation suits.

On June 9, 2020, North Carolina Governor Roy Cooper appointed Earls as the co-chair of North Carolina's Task Force for Racial Equity in Criminal Justice. The Task Force, convened in the wake of the murder of George Floyd, has begun issuing recommendations such as banning chokeholds, suggesting that law enforcement agencies implement "duty to report" rules regarding excessive force, and requiring North Carolina to include information on race in its data reporting. The work of the task force is ongoing.

Citing unnamed sources, the Washington Post reported that Earls was among the short-list of candidates under consideration by the Biden administration for nomination to the United States Supreme Court to replace retiring Justice Breyer. Ultimately, Biden nominated Federal Circuit Judge Ketanji Brown Jackson to fill the vacancy.

On August 29, 2023, Earls filed a lawsuit in Federal court (Earls v. North Carolina Judicial Standards Commission, et al., U.S. District Court for the Middle District of North Carolina, No. 23-cv-00734) accusing North Carolina's judicial ethics commission of launching an investigation into her that stifles her First Amendment-protected criticism of the lack of diversity in the state's courts, stemming from a Law360 interview in which she discussed potential "implicit biases" among her colleagues, a lack of Black law clerks being hired, and how the court's new conservative majority had disbanded a commission tasked with examining racial and gender inequality in the judicial system. The North Carolina Judicial Standards Commission is charged by statute with investigating anonymized complaints of judicial misconduct. Six of its fourteen members, including its Chair and Vice Chair, are appointed by the Chief Justice of the North Carolina State Supreme Court, currently Chief Justice Paul Newby (R). In a 2019 campaign speech Newby referred to his colleague Earls, saying "In 2018, the Left put $1.5 million to get their 'AOC' person on the court," and in 2022, Newby pushed out the Commission's chair days after the chair reminded state judges of the Code of Judicial Conduct's prohibited political conduct.

On October 22, 2024, Justice Earls announced on Twitter: "Yes, I am officially running for re-election in 2026."

== Electoral history ==
NC SUPREME COURT ASSOCIATE JUSTICE SEAT 1 (11/6/2018)
| Year | Democrat | Votes | Pct | Republican | Votes | Pct | Republican | Votes | Pct |
|---|---|---|---|---|---|---|---|---|---|
| 2018 | Anita Earls | 1,812,751 | 49.56% | Barbara Jackson | 1,246,263 | 34.07% | Christopher Anglin | 598,753 | 16.37% |

== Personal life ==
Anita is married to Charles D. Walton, a native of Raleigh, North Carolina. She has two children and one grandchild.

On January 6, 2026, Earls announced that she had been diagnosed with breast cancer late in 2025, describing the detection as early-stage and the prognosis as positive.

== See also ==
- Joe Biden Supreme Court candidates
- List of African-American jurists

Legal offices
| Preceded by Barbara Jackson | Associate Justice of the North Carolina Supreme Court; 2019–present | Incumbent |
