= 2008 North Carolina judicial elections =

One justice of the North Carolina Supreme Court and six judges of the North Carolina Court of Appeals were elected to eight-year terms by North Carolina voters on November 4, 2008. This coincided with the Presidential, U.S. Senate, U.S. House, Gubernatorial, Council of State, State Senate, and State House elections.

North Carolina judicial elections are non-partisan. Primary elections were held on May 6, 2008, for seats with more than two candidates running. The top two vote-getters in the primary, regardless of party affiliation, advanced to the general election.

Despite the non-partisan nature of the elections, candidates' party affiliations were well known. As a result of the elections, the Republicans maintained their 4–3 majority on the state Supreme Court. Democrats maintained their majority on the Court of Appeals. Only one Republican (Robert Hunter Jr.) defeated a Democrat in a Court of Appeals race.

== Supreme Court (Seat 6) ==
Incumbent Robert Edmunds Jr. ran for re-election and was opposed by Professor Suzanne Reynolds of Wake Forest University Law School. Edmunds defeated Reynolds in the closest statewide judicial race of 2008.

North Carolina Supreme Court Associate Justice (Seat 6) general election, 2008
Party	Candidate	Votes	%
Nonpartisan	Robert Edmunds Jr. (incumbent)	1,577,419	51.00%
Nonpartisan	Suzanne Reynolds	1,515,345	49.00%
Total votes		3,092,764	100%

== Court of Appeals (Seat 1) ==
Incumbent James Andrew Wynn was opposed by attorneys Dean R. Poirier and Jewel Ann Farlow in the May 6 primary.

Wynn and Farlow advanced to the November general election. Wynn won approximately 48 percent of the vote in the primary, followed by Farlow (37 percent) and Poirier (15 percent).

North Carolina Court of Appeals Judge (Seat 1) primary election, 2008
Party	Candidate	Votes	%
Nonpartisan	James Andrew Wynn (incumbent)	773,245	48.08%
Nonpartisan	Jewel Ann Farlow	600,110	37.31%
Nonpartisan	Dean R. Poirier	234,941	14.61%
Total votes		1,608,296	100%

North Carolina Court of Appeals Judge (Seat 1) general election, 2008
Party	Candidate	Votes	%
Nonpartisan	James Andrew Wynn (incumbent)	1,599,340	54.24%
Nonpartisan	Jewel Ann Farlow	1,349,552	45.76%
Total votes		2,948,892	100%

== Court of Appeals (Seat 7) ==
Incumbent Douglas McCullough was opposed by state District Court Judge Cheri Beasley.

North Carolina Court of Appeals Judge (Seat 7) general election, 2008
Party	Candidate	Votes	%
Nonpartisan	Cheri Beasley	1,706,132	57.42%
Nonpartisan	Douglas McCullough (incumbent)	1,265,378	42.58%
Total votes		2,971,510	100%

== Court of Appeals (Seat 10) ==
Incumbent John Martin, the court's Chief Judge, ran for re-election unopposed.

North Carolina Court of Appeals Judge (Seat 10) general election, 2008
Party	Candidate	Votes	%
Nonpartisan	John Martin (incumbent)	2,410,251	100%
Total votes		2,410,251	100%

== Court of Appeals (Seat 11) ==
Incumbent Linda Stephens ran for election, having been appointed in 2007. She was opposed by attorney Dan Barrett.

North Carolina Court of Appeals Judge (Seat 11) general election, 2008
Party	Candidate	Votes	%
Nonpartisan	Linda Stephens (incumbent)	1,729,139	58.76%
Nonpartisan	Dan Barrett	1,213,746	41.24%
Total votes		2,942,885	100%

== Court of Appeals (Seat 12) ==
Incumbent John Arrowood, appointed in 2007, was opposed by former state Board of Elections chairman Robert Hunter Jr.

North Carolina Court of Appeals Judge (Seat 12) general election, 2008
Party	Candidate	Votes	%
Nonpartisan	Robert Hunter Jr.	1,544,825	53.70%
Nonpartisan	John Arrowood (incumbent)	1,332,107	46.30%
Total votes		2,876,932	100%

== Court of Appeals (Seat 13) ==
Incumbent John Tyson was opposed by state District Court Judge Kristin Ruth, former Wake County Clerk of Court Janet Pueschel, and state Utilities Commissioner Sam Ervin IV.

In the May 6 primary, Ervin led the field with 37 percent of the vote, followed by Ruth (26 percent), Tyson (22 percent), and Pueschel (16 percent). Ervin and Ruth advanced to the November general election.

North Carolina Court of Appeals Judge (Seat 13) primary election, 2008
Party	Candidate	Votes	%
Nonpartisan	Sam Ervin IV	614,297	36.71%
Nonpartisan	Kristin Ruth	429,862	25.69%
Nonpartisan	John Tyson (incumbent)	366,028	21.87%
Nonpartisan	Janet Pueschel	263,183	15.73%
Total votes		1,673,370	100%

North Carolina Court of Appeals Judge (Seat 13) general election, 2008
Party	Candidate	Votes	%
Nonpartisan	Sam Ervin IV	1,559,466	53.09%
Nonpartisan	Kristin Ruth	1,378,112	46.91%
Total votes		2,937,578	100%
