= Kristin Ruth =

American judge

Kristin H. Ruth is a former state district court judge in North Carolina, who served District 10 (Wake County).

Ruth was the senior partner in her law firm for seven years before being elected to the bench in 1998. She was re-elected to four-year terms in 2002 and in 2006. She was elected as a vice president of the North Carolina Bar Association in 2010. Party affiliation is Democrat.

== Education ==
Ruth is a graduate of Kansas State University and the Norman Adrian Wiggins School of Law at Campbell University.

== Court of Appeals race ==
In 2007, she announced that she would run for the North Carolina Court of Appeals seat then held by John Tyson in the 2008 elections. In the May 6, 2008 non-partisan primary, Ruth came in second, which qualified her to run in the November general election against Sam J. Ervin, IV. Ervin defeated Ruth in the general election.

== Resignation ==
In February 2012, the North Carolina State Bureau of Investigation opened a probe into the handling of 12 drunken driving cases by Ruth. Ruth failed to review unusual orders submitted by an attorney changing the effective dates when judgments were entered, shortening or eliminating the suspension of drivers' licenses; and in each of the 12 cases the defense attorney was James Crouch, a Wake County criminal lawyer. Ruth resigned as a result of the investigation on May 18, 2012. She was later indicted for "failure to discharge her duties."

On July 30, 2012, she pleaded guilty for failing to discharge her duties as a Judge.
