= I. Beverly Lake Jr. =

American jurist and politician (1934–2019)

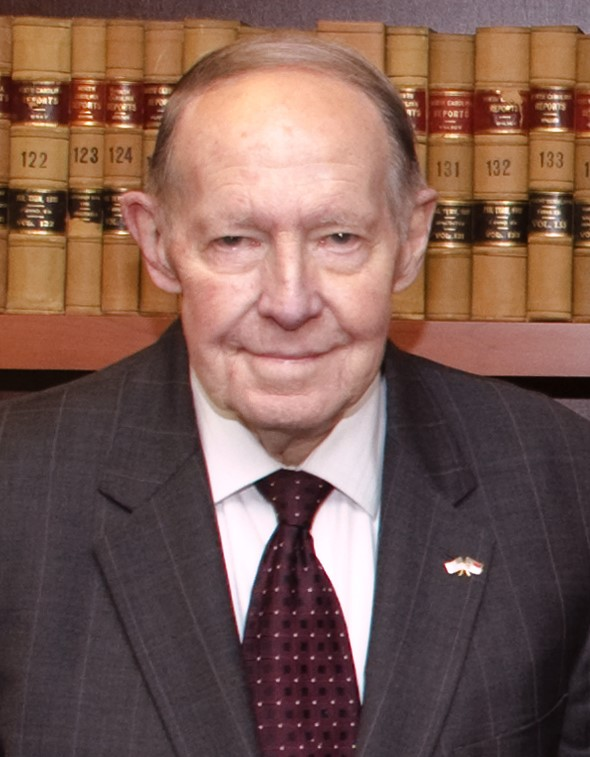
- Lake in 2015

Chief Justice of the North Carolina Supreme Court
- In office January 1, 2001 – January 30, 2006
- Preceded by: Henry Frye
- Succeeded by: Sarah Parker

Associate Justice of the North Carolina Supreme Court
- In office January 1, 1995 – January 1, 2001
- Preceded by: Sarah Parker
- Succeeded by: G. K. Butterfield
- In office February 5, 1992 – January 1, 1993
- Appointed by: James G. Martin
- Preceded by: Harry Martin
- Succeeded by: Sarah Parker

Member of the North Carolina Senate from the 14th district
- In office January 1, 1977 – January 1, 1981
- Preceded by: William Wayne Staton; Bobby Louis Barker
- Succeeded by: Joseph Edward Johnson

Personal details
- Born: Isaac Beverly Lake Jr. January 30, 1934 Raleigh, North Carolina, U.S.
- Died: September 12, 2019 (aged 85) Raleigh, North Carolina, U.S.
- Party: Republican (1979-2019); Democratic (before 1979)
- Education: Wake Forest University (BS, JD)

Isaac Beverly Lake Jr. (January 30, 1934 – September 12, 2019) was an American jurist and politician, who served as chief justice of the North Carolina Supreme Court.

== Early life ==
I. Beverly Lake Jr. was born on January 30, 1934, in Raleigh, North Carolina, United States to I. Beverly Lake Sr. and Gertrude Bell. He attended Wake Forest Grammar and High School from 1940 to 1951. He earned the rank of Eagle Scout in 1949. He received the Distinguished Eagle Scout Award in 2006. Lake also served briefly in the United States Army from 1956 to 1958. He got a Bachelor of Science degree from Wake Forest University in 1955, and secured a Juris Doctor from Wake Forest University School of Law in 1960.

== Political career ==
=== Early activities ===
In the late 1960s, Lake entered politics. Between 1969 and 1976, Lake served as an appointed deputy attorney general for the state of North Carolina. He served two terms in the North Carolina Senate as a Democrat. A conservative, in his last session in the legislature he convinced the body to remove segregation academies from state oversight.

=== 1980 gubernatorial election ===
In October 1979 Lake announced his intention to seek the Republican nomination in the upcoming 1980 North Carolina gubernatorial election. A few days later he officially switched his partisan registration from the Democratic Party to the Republican Party. He ran as the unsuccessful nominee against incumbent Governor Jim Hunt. While not campaigning on segregation, he refused to eschew his father's politics, saying that he was "proud of his public record".

=== Judicial career ===
From 1985 to 1986 Lake served as Governor James G. Martin's legislative liaison. Lake ran for the North Carolina Supreme Court in 1990 but lost to incumbent John Webb, who he had attacked as being "soft on crime". In 1992 Martin appointed Lake to the Supreme Court. He ran for election later that year but lost to Sarah Parker. In 1994 Lake re-contested the seat and defeated Parker with 55 percent of the vote. Along with Robert F. Orr, he became one of the first two Republicans elected to the bench.

He was elected as the court's chief justice in 2000, defeating incumbent Henry Frye. The two maintained cordial relations and occasionally golfed together. In April 2002 the court ruled that legislative districts drawn by Democratic legislative leaders violated North Carolina's constitution for not respecting county boundaries. Lake authored the majority opinion, writing that "Enforcement of the [whole counties provision] will, in all likelihood, foster improved voter morale, voter turnout, and public respect for state government, and specifically, the General Assembly, as an institution."

While serving as chief justice, a series of high-profile wrongful convictions in North Carolina came to his attention. He reviewed several of the cases with his clerk and resolved that the criminal justice system required reform. In 2002, he convened a commission including defense attorneys, prosecutors, law enforcement officers to review how innocent people were convicted and how to exonerate them. The body released a study which led to the creation of a new government agency, the N.C. Innocence Inquiry Commission, in 2006. It was designed to review convictions and release persons found innocent. By North Carolina law, he had to step down in 2006, after his 72nd birthday. He was succeeded by then-Associate Justice Sarah Parker.

== Electoral history ==
=== 2000 ===
North Carolina Supreme Court Chief Justice election, 2000
Party	Candidate	Votes	%
Republican	I. Beverly Lake Jr.	1,453,039	51.36%
Democratic	Henry Frye (incumbent)	1,375,820	48.64%
Total votes		2,828,859	100%
Republican gain from Democratic			

=== 1994 ===
North Carolina Supreme Court Associate Justice (Parker seat) election, 1994
Party	Candidate	Votes	%
Republican	I. Beverly Lake Jr.	757,870	54.78%
Democratic	Sarah Parker (incumbent)	625,656	45.22%
Total votes		1,383,526	100%
Republican gain from Democratic			

=== 1992 ===
North Carolina Supreme Court Associate Justice (Lake seat) election, 1992
Party	Candidate	Votes	%
Democratic	Sarah Parker	1,277,057	53.27%
Republican	I. Beverly Lake Jr. (incumbent)	1,120,479	46.73%
Total votes		2,397,536	100%
Democratic gain from Republican			

== Later life ==
Lake died on September 12, 2019, at the retirement home where he lived following a rapid decline in his health.

== Works cited ==
- Cheney, John L. Jr., ed. (1977). North Carolina Manual. Raleigh: North Carolina Secretary of State. OCLC 1245537.
- Christensen, Rob (2010). The Paradox of Tar Heel Politics : The Personalities, Elections, and Events That Shaped Modern North Carolina (second ed.). Chapel Hill: The University of North Carolina Press. ISBN 978-0-8078-7151-5.
- Fleer, Jack D. (1994). North Carolina Government & Politics. Lincoln: University of Nebraska Press. ISBN 9780803268852.
- Kritzer, Herbert M. (2020). Judicial Selection in the States: Politics and the Struggle for Reform. Cambridge University Press. ISBN 9781108496339.

North Carolina Senate
Preceded by William Wayne Staton; Bobby Louis Barker	Member from 14th district 1977–1981; Served alongside: John Wesley Winters, Clarence E. Lightner, Robert Webb Wynne, William Ayden Creech	Succeeded by Joseph Edward Johnson
Party political offices
Preceded by David Flaherty	Republican nominee for Governor of North Carolina; 1980	Succeeded by James G. Martin
Legal offices
Preceded by Harry Martin	Associate Justice of the North Carolina Supreme Court; 1992–1993	Succeeded by Sarah Parker
Preceded by Sarah Parker	Associate Justice of the North Carolina Supreme Court; 1995–2001	Succeeded by G. K. Butterfield
Preceded by Henry Frye	Chief Justice of the North Carolina Supreme Court; 2001–2006	Succeeded by Sarah Parker
