= Rusty Duke =

American judge (born 1948)

- Born: 1948 (age 77–78)
- Education: Wake Forest University
- Occupation: Judge

Russell "Rusty" Duke is a former judge of the North Carolina Superior Court in Pitt County, North Carolina. He ran unsuccessfully for the office of Chief Justice of the North Carolina Supreme Court in November 2006. Before serving on the Superior Court bench, he served as a District Court judge for two years, and prior to that was a general practitioner for ten years.

A Democrat for many years, he became a Republican upon seeking re-election. He received his high school diploma from Farmville High School in 1966 and a B.A. in history (1970) and JD (1974) from Wake Forest University.

From 1974 to January 1976 he was a law clerk for John D. Larkins, Jr., United States District Court Judge for the Eastern District of North Carolina.
