= Barbara Jackson =

American judge (born 1961)

Associate Justice of the North Carolina Supreme Court
- In office January 1, 2011 – December 31, 2018
- Preceded by: Edward Thomas Brady
- Succeeded by: Anita Earls

Judge of the North Carolina Court of Appeals
- In office January 1, 2005 – December 31, 2010
- Preceded by: Alan Thornburg
- Succeeded by: Cressie Thigpen

Personal details
- Born: December 25, 1961 (age 64)
- Party: Republican
- Education: University of North Carolina, Chapel Hill (BA, JD); Duke University (LLM)

Barbara Jackson (born December 25, 1961) is an American attorney and jurist who was elected in 2010 to an eight-year term on the North Carolina Supreme Court.

Jackson moved to Wake County at the age of 3 and graduated Athens Drive High School in 1980. Jackson, an alumna of the University of North Carolina at Chapel Hill (bachelor's degree, 1984; J.D. degree, 1990) and Duke University (LL.M. 2014), has worked as a legal counsel for the state of North Carolina for most of her legal career, working in the office of Governor James G. Martin (1991–1992), as an advocate for persons with disabilities (1992–1996), and as General Counsel to the North Carolina Department of Labor (2001–2004).

In 2004, Jackson was elected to an eight-year term on the North Carolina Court of Appeals, defeating incumbent judge Alan Thornburg in the statewide judicial elections. In 2010, Jackson was elected to a seat on the North Carolina Supreme Court that had been held by Edward Thomas Brady, who did not run for re-election. She defeated Robert C. Hunter, a colleague on the court of appeals, in the statewide judicial elections to win the seat. When she took office in January 2011, Jackson became the court's 96th associate justice and formed a 4-3 majority of female justices for the first time in the court's history. She lost a bid for a second term in the election of 2018 to Democratic attorney and civil rights activist Anita Earls.

== Electoral history ==
=== 2018 ===
North Carolina Supreme Court Associate Justice (Seat 1) election, 2018
Party	Candidate	Votes	%
Democratic	Anita Earls	1,812,751	49.56%
Republican	Barbara Jackson (incumbent)	1,246,263	34.07%
Republican	Christopher Anglin	598,753	16.37%
Total votes		3,657,767	100%
Democratic gain from Republican			

=== 2010 ===
North Carolina Supreme Court Associate Justice (Brady seat) election, 2010
Party	Candidate	Votes	%
Nonpartisan	Barbara Jackson	1,043,850	51.86%
Nonpartisan	Robert C. Hunter	969,019	48.14%
Total votes		2,012,869	100%

=== 2004 ===
North Carolina Court of Appeals (Thornburg seat) primary election, 2004
Party	Candidate	Votes	%
Nonpartisan	Barbara Jackson	240,110	36.69%
Nonpartisan	Alan Thornburg (incumbent)	227,764	34.80%
Nonpartisan	Marcus W. Williams	109,187	16.68%
Nonpartisan	Marvin Schiller	77,412	11.83%
Total votes		654,473	100%

North Carolina Court of Appeals (Thornburg seat) election, 2004
Party	Candidate	Votes	%
Nonpartisan	Barbara Jackson	1,399,528	55.07%
Nonpartisan	Alan Thornburg (incumbent)	1,141,896	44.93%
Total votes		2,541,424	100%

Legal offices
Preceded by Edward Thomas Brady	Associate Justice of the North Carolina Supreme Court; 2011–2019	Succeeded by Anita Earls
