= Henry Frye =

American politician (born 1932)

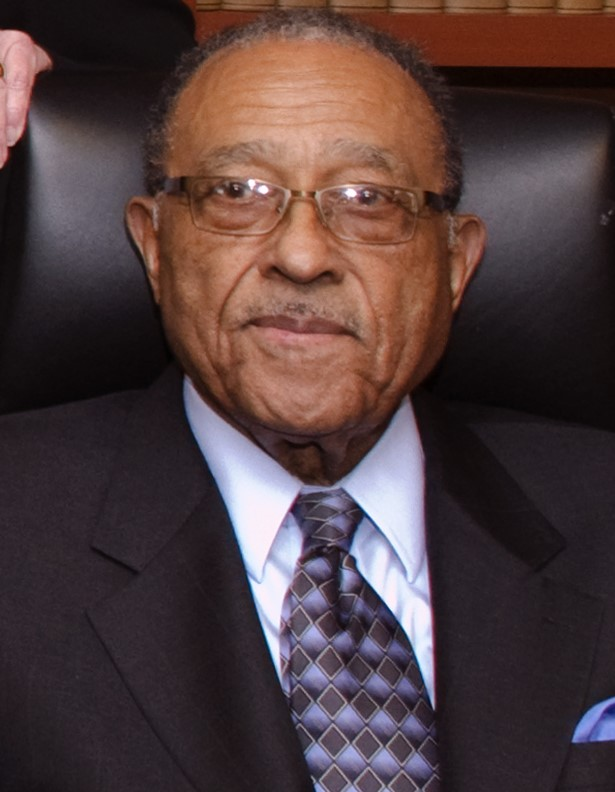
- Frye in 2015

Chief Justice of the North Carolina Supreme Court
- In office September 2, 1999 – January 1, 2001
- Appointed by: Jim Hunt
- Preceded by: Burley Mitchell
- Succeeded by: I. Beverly Lake Jr.

Associate Justice of the North Carolina Supreme Court
- In office January 13, 1983 – September 2, 1999
- Appointed by: Jim Hunt
- Preceded by: John Phillips Carlton
- Succeeded by: Franklin Freeman

Member of the North Carolina Senate from the 19th District
- In office January 1, 1981 – January 1, 1983
- Preceded by: James Turner
- Succeeded by: Elton Edwards

Member of the North Carolina House of Representatives
- In office January 1, 1969 – January 1, 1981
- Preceded by: Skipper Bowles; James G. Exum; Elton Edwards; Daniel Whitley Jr.
- Succeeded by: Dorothy Rockwell Burnley
- Constituency: 26th District (1969–1973); 23rd District (1973–1981)

Personal details
- Born: August 1, 1932 (age 94) Richmond County, North Carolina, U.S.
- Spouse: Shirley Taylor
- Education: North Carolina A&T State University; University of North Carolina School of Law
- Occupation: lawyer

Military service
- Allegiance: United States
- Branch/service: United States Air Force
- Rank: Captain

Henry E. Frye (born August 1, 1932) is an American judge and politician who served as the first African-American chief justice of the North Carolina Supreme Court.

== Early life and education ==
Henry Frye was born August 1, 1932, in Ellerbe, Richmond County, North Carolina. He was the 8th of 12 children, born to Walter Atlas and Pearl Motley Frye. His parents were tobacco and cotton farmers. He went to the Ellerbe Colored High School, but by accident, he obtained a diploma from Ellerbe High School, the white one. After graduating with honors from North Carolina A&T State University, Frye reached the rank of captain in the United States Air Force, serving in Korea and Japan. Upon returning to North Carolina, Frye was inspired to become a lawyer when he was denied the ability to register to vote by literacy tests. He was the only African American in his law school, but despite this Frye mentions never feeling as if he was treated differently. He graduated from the University of North Carolina School of Law.

== Career ==
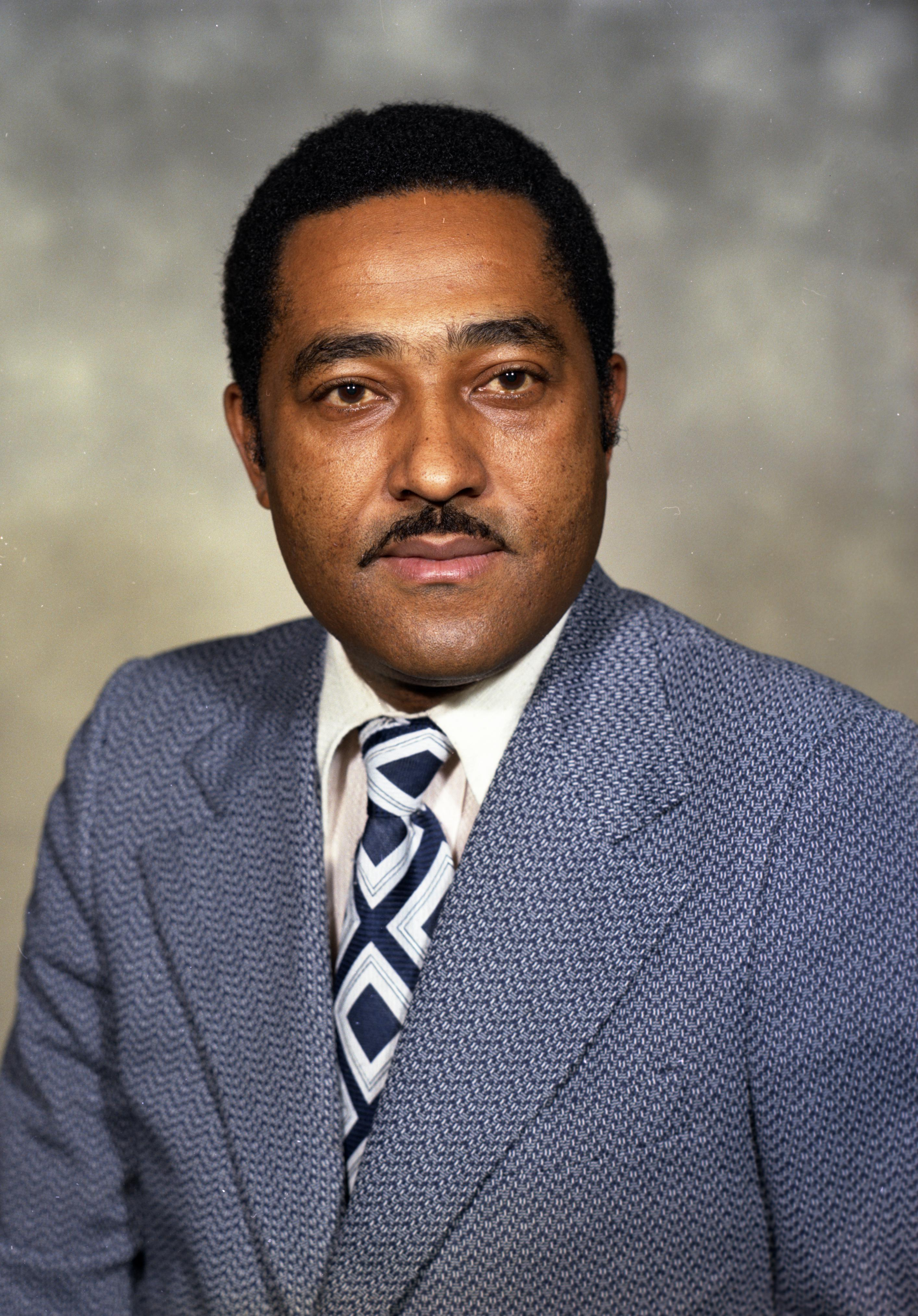
Frye c. 1973

Frye became an assistant U.S. Attorney in 1963, one of the first African-Americans to hold such a position in the South. Five years later, when Frye was elected to the North Carolina General Assembly as a state representative in 1968, he was the only black North Carolina legislator, and the first elected in the 20th century. He was sworn in to the North Carolina House of Representatives on January 15, 1969. Frye helped eliminate the vestiges of Jim Crow from North Carolina law. He was re-elected several times to the state House, serving until 1980, and served one term in the state Senate from 1981 to 1982. During this time, he was also an instructor at North Carolina Central University's law school.

In 1983, Governor Jim Hunt appointed Frye to the North Carolina Supreme Court as an associate justice, the first African-American to hold that position in North Carolina history. Frye was asked about his hopes for North Carolina's future, and said:

I would like to see North Carolina live up to is motto, to be rather than to seem. And by that I mean to do a better job of being fair and open in everything, from employment in the state government to encounters in the cities.

Elected in 1984 to the court and re-elected in 1992, Jim Hunt appointed Frye to the state's highest judicial post, chief justice, in 1999 to replace the retiring Burley Mitchell. He was defeated for election to a full term in 2000 by Associate Justice I. Beverly Lake Jr.

Frye's contemporaries noted his meticulous and curious working style: when beginning his political and judicial positions, he methodically studied up on state laws and court briefs, and he had a reputation for asking many probing questions. He enjoyed poetry and often incorporated poems, from others or written by himself, into speeches or tense moments.

Frye switched to private practice in 2001, working with the firm Brooks, Pierce, McLendon, Humphrey & Leonard in Greensboro, North Carolina. His specialties were mediation, commercial arbitration, and appellate advocacy. In 2016, he retired from the same firm.

== Awards and honors ==
In 2006, Frye and his wife, Shirley, received the Justice Award from the American Judicature Society, their highest honor. The award was granted for their outstanding work to improve the administration of American justice.

In 2007, Frye received the North Carolina Award for public service. He also received the North Carolina Bar Association's highest award, the John J. Parker Award.

In 2009, he became honorary co-chairman of the U.S. Senate campaign of Kenneth Lewis. He was named chairman of the North Carolina Institute of Political Leadership in 2013.

In 2014, the General Alumni Association awarded Frye the Distinguished Service Medal.

In 2015, a portrait of him by Victoria Carlin Milstein was dedicated to him in the North Carolina Supreme Court. Jim Hunt, the governor who first appointed Frye, spoke during the ceremony, as well as Fourth Circuit Appeals Court Judge James Wynn Jr. and one of Frye's law partners, Jim Williams. At the ceremony, Frye spoke of making progressive change, saying that the state had come a long way but had much further to go. He said that change only happens when people meet and work towards it, and he hoped "that we all will rededicate ourselves to making our state, and our country, the best that it can be."

In 2016, the North Carolina Bar Association gave him an inaugural Legal Legends of Color Award. He was later chosen to speak for Elreta Alexander-Ralston's posthumous 2021 Legal Legends of Color Award.

In 2017, he was invited to participate at the University of North Carolina School of Law's Constitution Day celebration.

In 2018, a bridge was named in his honor.

He has received honorary doctorates from Shaw University, Livingstone College, Fayetteville State University, and North Carolina A&T.

== Family ==
Frye is married to Shirley Frye, a civil rights and social justice advocate who has won awards for her public service in local news, government, and educational organizations. In the 1970s, she led the integration of Greensboro's two YWCAs.

One of their children, Henry Frye Jr., also became a lawyer and judge. Frye is the granduncle of professional basketball player Channing Frye.

== Electoral history ==
=== 2000 ===
North Carolina Supreme Court Chief Justice election, 2000
Party	Candidate	Votes	%
Republican	I. Beverly Lake Jr.	1,453,039	51.36%
Democratic	Henry Frye (incumbent)	1,375,820	48.64%
Total votes		2,828,859	100%
Republican gain from Democratic			

=== 1984 ===
North Carolina Supreme Court Associate Justice (Frye seat) Democratic primary election, 1984
Party	Candidate	Votes	%
Democratic	Henry Frye (incumbent)	427,124	60.08%
Democratic	Raymond Taylor	283,784	39.92%
Total votes		710,908	100%

North Carolina Supreme Court Associate Justice (Frye seat) election, 1984
Party	Candidate	Votes	%
Democratic	Henry Frye (incumbent)	1,105,152	54.74%
Republican	Clarence Boyan	913,733	45.26%
Total votes		2,018,885	100%
Democratic hold			

North Carolina House of Representatives
Preceded by Skipper Bowles; James G. Exum; Elton Edwards; Daniel Whitley Jr.	Member of the North Carolina House of Representatives from the 26th district 1969–1973; Served alongside: William Marcus Short, Howard Coble, Robert Odell Payne, Charles Phillips, John Lawson Ridenour III, Clifton Tredway Hunt Jr., John McNeill Smith Jr.	Succeeded by Foyle Robert Hightower Jr.
Preceded by Norwood Bryan Jr. Joseph Bryant Raynor Jr. Lewis Sneed High; Glenn Reginald Jernigan	Member of the North Carolina House of Representatives from the 23rd district 1973–1981; Served alongside: Thomas Odell Gilmore, Margaret Pollard Keesee, Robert Odell Payne, Charles Edward Webb, Charles Phillips, Thomas Sawyer, Leo Joseph Heer, William Marcus Short, James Franklin Morgan, Mary Powell Seymour, Howard Coble, Ralph Pearson Edwards, Byron Allen Haworth	Succeeded by Dorothy Rockwell Burnley
North Carolina Senate
Preceded by James Turner	Member of the North Carolina Senate from the 19th district 1981–1983; Served alongside: Walter Carl Cockerham, Rachel Gillean Gray	Succeeded by Elton Edwards
Legal offices
Preceded by John Phillips Carlton	Associate Justice of the North Carolina Supreme Court; 1983–1999	Succeeded by Franklin Freeman
Preceded by Burley Mitchell	Chief Justice of the North Carolina Supreme Court; 1999–2001	Succeeded by I. Beverly Lake Jr.

== See also ==
- List of African-American jurists
