= John M. Tyson =

American judge

Judge on the North Carolina Court of Appeals
- Incumbent
- Assumed office January 1, 2015
- Preceded by: Lisa Bell
- In office January 1, 2001 – December 31, 2008
- Preceded by: Joe John
- Succeeded by: Sam Ervin IV

Personal details
- Born: July 14, 1953 (age 73) Cumberland County, North Carolina
- Education: University of North Carolina at Wilmington; Norman Adrian Wiggins School of Law
- Occupation: Judge

John Marsh Tyson (born July 14, 1953) is an American jurist and government official who currently serves as a judge of the North Carolina Court of Appeals. He also previously served on the court from 2001 to 2009.

== Personal background ==
Judge John M. Tyson was born in Cumberland County, North Carolina on July 14, 1953. He is the youngest child of Henry McMillan Tyson and Addie Amelia Williams. His father served six terms as a Representative in the N.C. House between 1973 and 1985. In his youth, John worked on the family farm in Gray's Creek, picking and hanging tobacco leaves for harvest.

In May 2021, Tyson was accused by Black Lives Matter activists of attempting to hit them with his vehicle before driving onto the sidewalk.

On May 14, 2021, Tyson was issued a summons to appear in court in June to answer to a charge of assault with a deadly weapon.

On June 14, the charges were dismissed.

== Educational background ==
Tyson graduated from Terry Sanford High School, in Fayetteville, North Carolina, in 1971. After graduating from high school, Tyson attended University of North Carolina at Wilmington, in Wilmington, North Carolina, and earned his Bachelor of Arts, (B.A.) degree with an English and secondary education emphasis, as a member of the dean's list, in 1974.

He attended Campbell University's Norman Adrian Wiggins School of Law, in Buies Creek, North Carolina, and earned his Juris Doctor (J.D.) in 1979, the law school's inaugural class.

In addition, Tyson has earned numerous professional degrees and accreditations. He attended Notre Dame Law School – through the London School of Economic & Political Science, in London, England, during their summer program, in 1977. In 1988, he attended Duke University's Fuqua School of Business, in Durham, North Carolina, and earned his Master of Business Administration, (MBA).

He attended the New York University School of Law, in New York, for the Appellate Judges' Seminar, during the summer of 2001.

In May 2004, he attended the University of Virginia School of Law, in Charlottesville, Virginia, and earned a Master of Laws in judicial process, (LL.M.) degree.

== Professional background ==
In 2000, Tyson was elected to the North Carolina Court of Appeals. His term began in January 2001. He was defeated for re-election to a second term in 2008. He continued to serve as a recall judge on the Court of Appeals, and as an emergency North Carolina Superior Court judge, and was an adjunct professor of law at the Norman Adrian Wiggins School of Law (Campbell University). Tyson was elected to the Court of Appeals again in November 2014 for a term beginning in January 2015.

Prior to serving on the North Carolina Court of Appeals, Tyson worked at Tyson & Associates, where he practiced landlord-tenant, land use, and real property law, civil litigation and criminal defense. Judge Tyson is a Board Certified Specialist by the North Carolina State Bar Board of Legal Specialization for real property law, business, commercial, and industrial transactions, the only North Carolina judge so certified.

Tyson practiced law in Fayetteville from 1993 until 1996 and from 1996 until his election to the court, with a brief tenure as the senior vice president of development for Blockbuster Entertainment Group in Fort Lauderdale, Florida, in 1996.

He worked as a real estate director and counsel for Revco Drug Stores, Inc., from 1982 to 1993 and in similar capacities for Family Dollar Stores, Inc., from 1980 to 1982.

He served as a North Carolina probation and parole officer for the North Carolina Department of Correction, from 1975 to 1976. He has also been a public school teacher and deputy sheriff in Cumberland County.

Tyson has had at least 30 years of experience in the private practice of law, senior level corporate real estate development and counsel positions, and at least 25 years as a professor of law and author.

Tyson is a member of the North Carolina and Virginia State Bars and a certified mediator and arbitrator. He is a past member of the North Carolina Property Tax Commission and past elected chairman of the Cumberland County Joint Planning Board and the Cumberland Soil and Water Conservation District. Judge Tyson is a frequent CLE presenter and author, and holds an AV-Pre-eminent peer-reviewed rating from Martindale Hubbell.

Bar admissions

- North Carolina State Bar, 1980 (applies to all North Carolina courts)
- Virginia State Bar, 1981
- United States Supreme Court Bar, 1983
- United States Court of Appeals Bar (4th Circuit), 1980
- United States District Court Bar (for WDNC in 1980) & (for EDNC in 1997)

Professional organizations

- North Carolina Academy of Trial Lawyers, 1979–1980.
- American Bar Association, 1980–1992;
- Cumberland County Bar Association, 1980–present;
- North Carolina Bar Association, 1980–present;
- American Arbitration Association, member of Panel of Arbitrators, 1991–present;
- Certified as mediator by the North Carolina Administrative Office of the Courts and the Dispute Resolution Commission for North Carolina Superior Court Mediation, 1992–present;
- Certified United States District Court Mediator (E.D.N.C.), 1993–present;
- Technology Advisory Committee, 2001–2003;
- Wake County Bar Association, 2001–2008;
- North Carolina Association of Women Attorneys, 2002–2008;
- Certified Appellate Mediator, North Carolina Court of Appeals, 2003–present;
- Women in the Profession Committee, 2004–2005;
- Minorities in the Profession Committee, 2004–2005;
- Law School Liaison Committee, 2006–present;
- Vice president, board of governors, 2007–2008;
- Family Law Section Council, 2007–2008;
- Certified Arbitrator, Financial Industry Regulatory Authority, (FINRA), 2009–present;
- Bench Bar Liaison Committee, 2011–present;

== Publications ==
- Getting Paid, Avoiding Conflicts, and Supervising Staff: Fee Arrangements, Multi-party Representation, and Delegation of Duties, The North Carolina State Bar Journal, 16 No. 2 (Summer, 2011).
- Automatic Stays and Administrative Expenses: Rights and Remedies Available to Landlords and Tenants in Bankruptcy Law. 31 CAMPBELL L. REV. 413 (Spring, 2009).
- A Short History of the American Bar Association’s Code of Ethics and Model Rules of Professional Responsibility: 1908-2008, 1 CHARLOTTE L. REV 9 (Fall, 2008).
- The Attorney’s Ethical Duties to Supervise Law Office Staff, The North Carolina State Bar Journal, 13 No. 1 (Spring, 2008).
- Presumed Guilty Until Proven Innocent: Using Results of Statistical or Econometric Studies as Evidence, which appears in 10 ST. THOMAS L.REV. 387 (Winter, 1998); cited in 5B Wash. Prac., Evidence Law and Practice Sec 702.55 (4th ed.) and was printed in 2005;
- Drafting, Interpreting, and Enforcing Commercial and Shopping Center Leases, which appeared in 14 CAMPBELL L.REV. 275 (1992), which was cited, quoted with interpretation, and adopted by the North Carolina Court of Appeals, Pleasant Valley Promenade v. Lechmere, Inc., 120 NC App. 650, 464 S.E.2d 47 (1995); cited and quoted by the West Virginia Supreme Court of Appeals: Frederick Business Properties Co. v. Peoples DrugStores, Inc., 445 S.E.2d 176, 191 W.Va. 235 (W.Va. May 20, 1994); and by the Tennessee Court of Appeals: BVT Leb. Shopping Ctr., Ltd. v. Wal-Mart Stores, Inc., 1999 Tenn. App. LEXIS 267, 1999 WL 236273 (Tenn. Ct. App. Apr. 23, 1999); Reviewed by Frona M. Powell in 23 Real Est. L.J. 178 (1994);
- The Philosophy of Negotiation, which appeared in the Retail Leasing Reporter, in May, 1990.;
- Mean Consolidated Forecasting: A Process to Improve the Accuracy and Sensitivity of Economic Forecasts, which appeared in MBA Forecasts through Duke University on page 107, in 1989;
- Statutory Standards of Care for North Carolina Health Care Providers, which appeared in 1 CAMPBELL L.REV. 111 (1979), cited, quoted with interpretation adopted by the North Carolina Supreme Court, Wall v. Stout, 310 NC 184, 311 S.E.2d 571 in 1984 and was reviewed by Justice I. Beverly Lake Sr. and appeared in the Cambell Law Observer in 1980.
- Panelist at the University of Virginia School of Law Conference on Public Service and the Law and contributed to the article "Judicial Election Campaigns: Free Speech, Public Dollars, and the Role of Judges", which was released on February 12, 2005;
- "A Judge Salutes Another", a letter to the editor of The Fayetteville Observer, on October 31, 2005, p. 11A.

== Boards and commissions ==
Tyson was most recently appointed to the North Carolina State Ethics Commission by the North Carolina House of Representatives for a three-year term beginning in 2013. He was appointed to the North Carolina Judicial Conference Committee on Compensation and Benefits by the chief justice of North Carolina (2002–2008). He was appointed to the North Carolina Property Tax Commission by the Speaker of the North Carolina House of Representatives, where he served from 1997 to 1999. He was appointed to the Legislative Research Committee on Private Property Rights by the President Pro Tempore of the North Carolina Senate served in 1995. He was a member of the Legislative Research Committee on Impact Fees, Exactions and Dedications by the President Pro-tem of the Senate in 1994. He was elected to the Cumberland County Soil & Water Conservation District, where he served as vice chairman and later chairman of the board, and served from 1992 to 1996. He was appointed to the Cumberland County Joint Planning and Zoning Board, where he was elected vice-chairman and later chairman of the board, and served from 1993 to 2001.

== Military service ==
He was commissioned as captain, promoted to major, lieutenant colonel and served as colonel and staff judge advocate for the North Carolina State Defense Militia, under the command of the adjutant general of North Carolina from 1987 to 1996, and is currently in inactive reserve. He served as a colonel and staff judge advocate for the United States Service Command in Division III, (a volunteer non-profit disaster relief organization), from 1999 to 2004.

== Electoral history ==
=== 2022 ===
North Carolina Court of Appeals (Tyson seat) election, 2022
Party	Candidate	Votes	%
Republican	John Tyson (incumbent)	1,967,192	52.74%
Democratic	Gale Murray Adams	1,762,793	47.26%
Total votes		3,729,985	100%
Republican hold			

=== 2014 ===
North Carolina Court of Appeals (Martin seat) election, 2014
Party	Candidate	Votes	%
Nonpartisan	John Tyson	557,700	23.84%
Nonpartisan	John S. Arrowood	336,839	14.40%
Nonpartisan	Keischa Lovelace	226,159	9.67%
Nonpartisan	Marion Warren	143,279	6.13%
Nonpartisan	Elizabeth Davenport Scott	131,330	5.61%
Nonpartisan	Marty Martin	120,281	5.14%
Nonpartisan	Hunter Murphy	103,361	4.42%
Nonpartisan	Ann Kirby	96,468	4.12%
Nonpartisan	Valerie Zachary	92,361	3.95%
Nonpartisan	Lori G. Christian	88,819	3.80%
Nonpartisan	Tricia Shields	79,357	3.39%
Nonpartisan	Daniel Patrick Donahue	66,168	2.83%
Nonpartisan	Abe Jones	59,712	2.55%
Nonpartisan	Chuck Winfree	52,978	2.26%
Nonpartisan	Jeffrey M. Cook	48,336	2.07%
Nonpartisan	Jody Newsome	38,544	1.65%
Nonpartisan	Betsy Bunting	36,163	1.55%
Nonpartisan	Sabra Jean Faires	31,759	1.36%
Nonpartisan	J. Brad Donovan	29,580	1.26%
Total votes		2,339,194	100%

=== 2008 ===
North Carolina Court of Appeals (Tyson seat) primary election, 2008
Party	Candidate	Votes	%
Nonpartisan	Sam Ervin IV	614,297	36.71%
Nonpartisan	Kristin Ruth	429,862	25.69%
Nonpartisan	John Tyson (incumbent)	366,028	21.87%
Nonpartisan	Janet Pueschel	263,183	15.73%
Total votes		1,673,370	100%

=== 2000 ===
North Carolina Court of Appeals (John seat) election, 2000
Party	Candidate	Votes	%
Republican	John Tyson	1,364,239	50.07%
Democratic	Jim Fuller	1,360,309	49.93%
Total votes		2,724,548	100%
Republican gain from Democratic			

Legal offices
Preceded by Joe John	Judge of the North Carolina Court of Appeals; 2001–2009	Succeeded by Sam Ervin IV
Preceded by Lisa Bell	Judge of the North Carolina Court of Appeals; 2015–Present	Incumbent
