= Burley Mitchell =

American judge

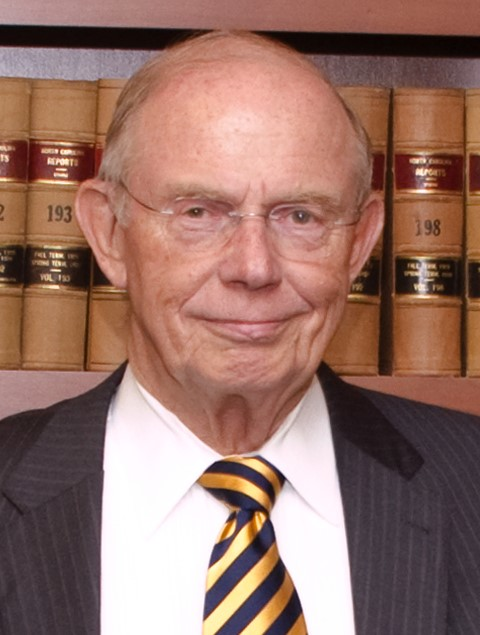
- Mitchell in 2015

Chief Justice of the North Carolina Supreme Court
- In office January 1, 1995 – September 1, 1999
- Appointed by: Jim Hunt
- Preceded by: James G. Exum
- Succeeded by: Henry Frye

Associate Justice of the North Carolina Supreme Court
- In office February 3, 1982 – January 1, 1995
- Appointed by: Jim Hunt
- Preceded by: J. Frank Huskins
- Succeeded by: Sarah Parker

Judge of the North Carolina Court of Appeals
- In office 1977–1979

Personal details
- Born: December 15, 1940 (age 84); Oxford, North Carolina, U.S.
- Political party: Democratic
- Spouse: Mary Lou Willett
- Children: 1
- Education: North Carolina State University (BA); University of North Carolina at Chapel Hill (JD)
- Profession: Lawyer, judge

Burley Bayard Mitchell Jr. (born December 15, 1940) is an American jurist and former Chief Justice of the North Carolina Supreme Court.

== Education and early career ==
He received his bachelor's degree from North Carolina State University and his J.D. degree from the University of North Carolina at Chapel Hill.

A veteran of the United States Navy, Mitchell served as an Assistant Attorney General of North Carolina from 1969 to 1972 and as a District Attorney from 1972 to 1977. He was a judge of the North Carolina Court of Appeals from 1977 to 1979, when Governor Jim Hunt appointed Mitchell as his Secretary of Crime Control and Public Safety.

== Supreme Court service ==
Mitchell served as an associate justice of the North Carolina Supreme Court from 1982 to 1994 and as chief justice from 1995 to 1999. Gov. Hunt appointed Mitchell to the office of chief justice in late 1994 to take the place of the retiring James G. Exum. In 1996, Mitchell was elected to the post in the general election, defeating Republican Ray Warren.

As a judge, Mitchell wrote 484 decisions, including the landmark Leandro v. State of North Carolina case regarding educational opportunities for all North Carolina children. He was also well known for reducing the court's backlog. Mitchell was also known for securing additional resources for the court system for technology and personnel through appropriations at the state level as well as projects for the criminal justice system at the federal level. Mitchell's staff at the Administrative Office of the Courts included North Carolina Court of Appeals Judge Jack L. Cozort, who took leave to work for Mitchell as acting AOC director, and deputy director Jeanne Milliken Bonds, who was serving on the Knightdale Town Council at the time.

=== Electoral history ===
==== 1996 ====
North Carolina Supreme Court Chief Justice election, 1996
Party	Candidate	Votes	%
Democratic	Burley Mitchell (incumbent)	1,221,232	51.29%
Republican	Ray Warren	1,159,678	48.71%
Total votes		2,380,910	100%
Democratic hold			

==== 1984 ====
North Carolina Supreme Court Associate Justice (Mitchell seat) election, 1984
Party	Candidate	Votes	%
Democratic	Burley Mitchell (incumbent)	1,086,047	54.50%
Republican	Arthur Donaldson	906,524	45.50%
Total votes		1,992,568	100%
Democratic hold			

== Post-Supreme Court activities ==
Mitchell retired and joined the law firm of Womble Carlyle Sandridge & Rice PLLC. He has also served as a member of the Board of Trustees for North Carolina State University, as a member of the University of North Carolina system board of governors, and as chairman of U.S. Senator Kay Hagan's advisory panel on federal judicial nominees.

In 2006, Mitchell helped found a so-called 527 group called FairJudges.net, which aimed to educate North Carolina voters about state appellate judicial candidates.

In 2007, Mitchell received the North Carolina Award for public service.

Legal offices
Preceded by J. Frank Huskins	Associate Justice of the North Carolina Supreme Court; 1983–1995	Succeeded by Sarah Parker
Preceded by James G. Exum	Chief Justice of the North Carolina Supreme Court; 1995–1999	Succeeded by Henry Frye
