= North Carolina's 92nd House district =

American legislative district

North Carolina's 92nd State House of Representatives district
Representative
Terry Brown; D–Charlotte
- Demographics: 28% White; 37% Black; 21% Hispanic; 7% Asian; 1% Other; 7% Multiracial
- Population (2024): 101,279

North Carolina's 92nd House district is one of 120 districts in the North Carolina House of Representatives. It has been represented by Democrat Terry Brown since 2021.

== Geography ==
Since 2013, the district has included part of Mecklenburg County. The district overlaps with the 39th Senate district.

== District officeholders ==
Representative	Party	Dates	Notes	Counties
District created January 1, 1993.
Erin Kuczmarski (Raleigh)	Democratic	January 1, 1993 – January 1, 1995	Lost re-election.	1993–2003; Parts of Wake and Durham counties.
Russell Capps (Raleigh)	Republican	January 1, 1995 – January 1, 2003	Redistricted to the 50th district.	1993–2003; Parts of Wake and Durham counties.
George Holmes (Hamptonville)	Republican	January 1, 2003 – January 1, 2009	Redistricted from the 41st district. Retired.	2003–2005; All of Yadkin County. Part of Forsyth County.
George Holmes (Hamptonville)	Republican	January 1, 2003 – January 1, 2009	Redistricted from the 41st district. Retired.	2005–2013; All of Yadkin County. Parts of Iredell and Surry counties.
Darrell McCormick (Yadkinville)	Republican	January 1, 2009 – January 1, 2013	Redistricted to the 73rd district and lost re-nomination.	2005–2013; All of Yadkin County. Parts of Iredell and Surry counties.
Charles Jeter (Huntersville)	Republican	January 1, 2013 – July 25, 2016	Resigned.	2013–Present; Part of Mecklenburg County.
Vacant		July 25, 2016 – August 23, 2016		2013–Present; Part of Mecklenburg County.
Justin Moore (Huntersville)	Republican	August 23, 2016 – January 1, 2017	Appointed to finish Jeter's term. Retired.	2013–Present; Part of Mecklenburg County.
Chaz Beasley (Charlotte)	Democratic	January 1, 2017 – January 1, 2021	Retired to run for Lieutenant Governor.	2013–Present; Part of Mecklenburg County.
Terry Brown (Charlotte)	Democratic	January 1, 2021 – Present		2013–Present; Part of Mecklenburg County.

== Election results ==
=== 2024 ===
North Carolina House of Representatives 92nd district general election, 2024
Party	Candidate	Votes	%
Democratic	Terry Brown (incumbent)	37,214	100%
Total votes		37,214	100%
Democratic hold			

=== 2022 ===
North Carolina House of Representatives 92nd district general election, 2022
Party	Candidate	Votes	%
Democratic	Terry Brown (incumbent)	17,849	69.45%
Republican	Mario J. Robinson Sr.	7,851	30.55%
Total votes		25,700	100%
Democratic hold			

=== 2020 ===
North Carolina House of Representatives 92nd district general election, 2020
Party	Candidate	Votes	%
Democratic	Terry Brown	34,990	72.91%
Republican	Jerry Munden	12,998	27.09%
Total votes		47,988	100%
Democratic hold			

=== 2018 ===
North Carolina House of Representatives 92nd district general election, 2018
Party	Candidate	Votes	%
Democratic	Chaz Beasley (incumbent)	20,043	70.02%
Republican	Debbie Ware	8,580	29.98%
Total votes		28,623	100%
Democratic hold			

=== 2016 ===
North Carolina House of Representatives 92nd district Republican primary election, 2016
Party	Candidate	Votes	%
Republican	Charles Jeter (incumbent)	3,731	50.24%
Republican	Tom Davis	3,696	49.76%
Total votes		7,427	100%

North Carolina House of Representatives 92nd district general election, 2016
Party	Candidate	Votes	%
Democratic	Chaz Beasley	22,941	54.38%
Republican	Beth Danae Caulfield	19,246	45.62%
Total votes		42,187	100%
Democratic gain from Republican			

=== 2014 ===
North Carolina House of Representatives 92nd district general election, 2014
Party	Candidate	Votes	%
Republican	Charles Jeter (incumbent)	11,757	52.54%
Democratic	Robin Bradford	10,621	47.46%
Total votes		22,378	100%
Republican hold			

=== 2012 ===
North Carolina House of Representatives 92nd district Republican primary election, 2012
Party	Candidate	Votes	%
Republican	Charles Jeter	2,947	54.17%
Republican	Tom Davis	2,493	45.83%
Total votes		5,440	100%

North Carolina House of Representatives 92nd district general election, 2012
Party	Candidate	Votes	%
Republican	Charles Jeter	18,843	51.40%
Democratic	Robin Bradford	17,820	48.60%
Total votes		36,663	100%
Republican win (new seat)			

=== 2010 ===
North Carolina House of Representatives 92nd district general election, 2010
Party	Candidate	Votes	%
Republican	Darrell McCormick (incumbent)	15,883	100%
Total votes		15,883	100%
Republican hold			

=== 2008 ===
North Carolina House of Representatives 92nd district Republican primary election, 2008
Party	Candidate	Votes	%
Republican	Darrell McCormick	4,693	70.79%
Republican	Dempsey B. Brewer	1,936	29.21%
Total votes		6,629	100%

North Carolina House of Representatives 92nd district general election, 2008
Party	Candidate	Votes	%
Republican	Darrell McCormick	18,219	63.16%
Democratic	Ric Marshall	10,626	36.84%
Total votes		28,845	100%
Republican hold			

=== 2006 ===
North Carolina House of Representatives 92nd district Republican primary election, 2006
Party	Candidate	Votes	%
Republican	George Holmes (incumbent)	3,663	73.22%
Republican	Yancy St. John	1,340	26.78%
Total votes		5,003	100%

North Carolina House of Representatives 92nd district general election, 2006
Party	Candidate	Votes	%
Republican	George Holmes (incumbent)	10,664	100%
Total votes		10,664	100%
Republican hold			

=== 2004 ===
North Carolina House of Representatives 92nd district general election, 2004
Party	Candidate	Votes	%
Republican	George Holmes (incumbent)	20,830	100%
Total votes		20,830	100%
Republican hold			

=== 2002 ===
North Carolina House of Representatives 92nd district general election, 2002
Party	Candidate	Votes	%
Republican	George Holmes (incumbent)	16,881	86.59%
Libertarian	Adam Wilson	2,614	13.41%
Total votes		19,495	100%
Republican hold			

=== 2000 ===
North Carolina House of Representatives 92nd district general election, 2000
Party	Candidate	Votes	%
Republican	Russell Capps (incumbent)	22,465	57.20%
Democratic	Dorothy Bowles	16,807	42.80%
Total votes		39,272	100%
Republican hold			
