= Yvonne Lewis Holley =

American politician from North Carolina

Yvonne Holley
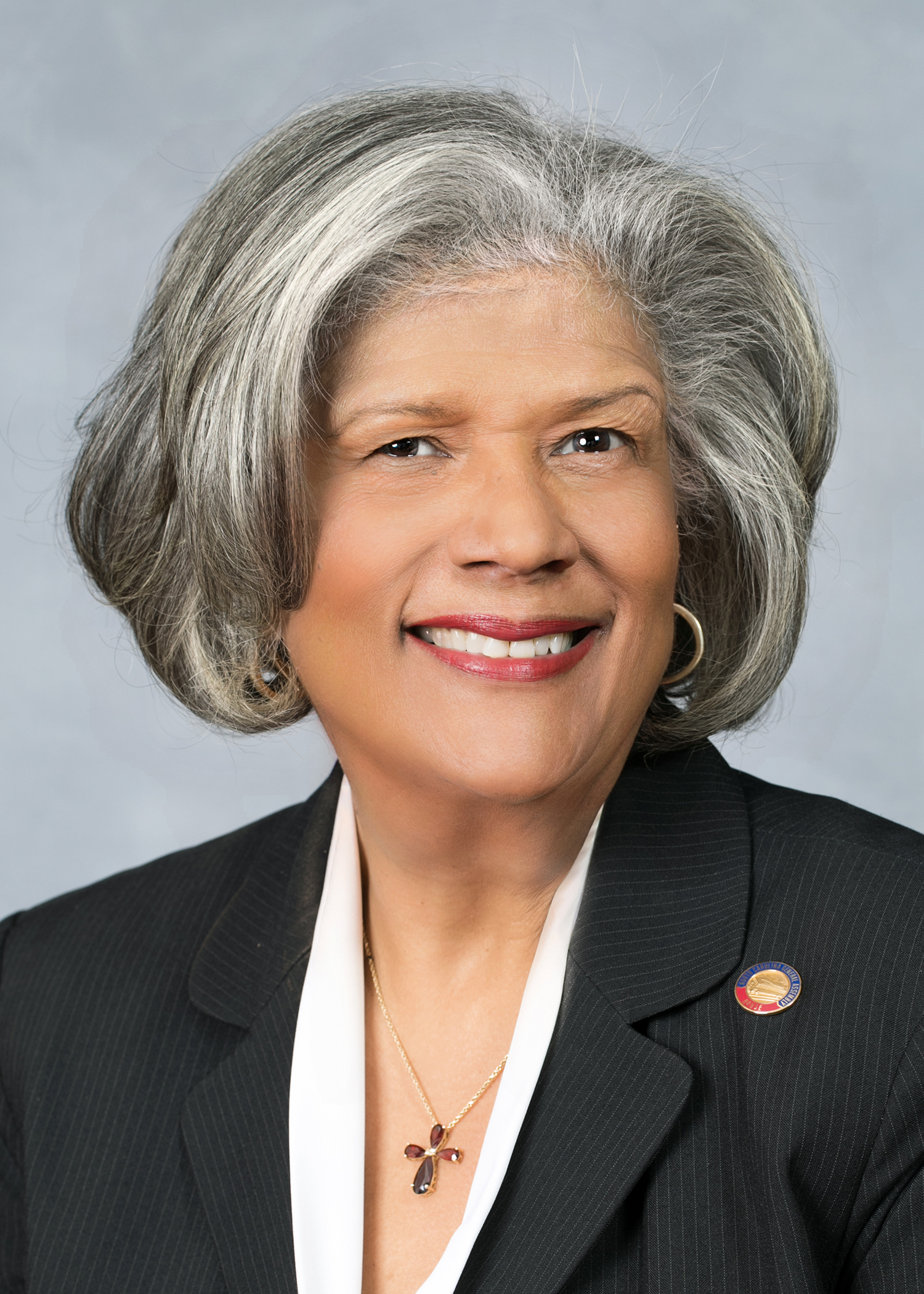
- official portrait, 2017

Member of the North Carolina House of Representatives from the 38th district
- In office January 1, 2013 – January 1, 2021
- Preceded by: Harold Brubaker
- Succeeded by: Abe Jones

Personal details
- Born: January 27, 1952 (age 74) Raleigh, North Carolina, U.S.
- Party: Democratic
- Education: Howard University (BA)

Yvonne Lewis Holley (born August 12, 1952) is an American politician who served as the North Carolina state representative for the 38th district from 2013 to 2021. A member of the Democratic Party, her district consisted of part of Wake County. She was the Democratic nominee for lieutenant governor of North Carolina in the 2020 North Carolina lieutenant gubernatorial election, which she narrowly lost to Mark Robinson.

== Early life and education ==
Holley is the daughter of Raleigh broadcast personality J.D. Lewis of WRAL-TV. She attended William G. Enloe High School and graduated from Howard University, with a B.A. in political science and government in 1974.

== Career ==
Before her career as a state legislator, she worked for the North Carolina Department of Administration, division of purchase and contract, as a procurement and contract specialist. In 2020, governor Roy Cooper appointed Holley to the Andrea Harris social, economic, environmental, and health equity task force.

=== 2020 campaign for lieutenant governor ===
Holley unsuccessfully ran for lieutenant governor of North Carolina in the 2020 election. She placed first in the Democratic primary on March 3, 2020, but with less than the 30 percent required to avoid the possibility of a runoff. The second-place finisher, Terry Van Duyn, declined to call for a runoff, however, making Holley the Democratic nominee.

Holley campaigned on what she called an Affordable Living Initiative (ALI), which would bring together "public/private partnerships, non-profits, urban and rural governments, legislators, environmentalists, homebuilders, and everyday citizens to help solve some of the problems that have become critical needs in communities across NC. ALI will focus on the following: attainable housing; access to affordable and healthy food; jobs (living wages, entrepreneurial, small business, and workforce development); and transportation."

Holley lost the general election to the Republican candidate, Mark Robinson, 51%-48%.

== Election History ==
=== 2020 ===
North Carolina Lieutenant Gubernatorial Election
Party	Candidate	Votes	%
Republican	Mark Robinson	2,800,656	51.63%
Democratic	Yvonne Lewis Holley	2,623,458	48.37%
Total votes		5,424,114	100.0%
Republican hold			

North Carolina Lieutenant Governor Democratic Primary
Party	Candidate	Votes	%
Democratic	Yvonne Lewis Holley	309,274	26.58%
Democratic	Terry Van Duyn	237,885	20.44%
Democratic	Chaz Beasley	219,503	18.86%
Democratic	Allen Thomas	219,229	18.84%
Democratic	Bill Toole	111,843	9.61%
Democratic	Ron Newton	65,970	5.67%
Total votes		1,163,704	100.00%

=== 2018 ===
North Carolina House of Representatives 38th district general election, 2018
Party	Candidate	Votes	%
Democratic	Yvonne Lewis Holley (incumbent)	23,985	81.90%
Republican	Ken Bagnal	4,532	15.48%
Libertarian	Bobby Yates Emory	768	2.62%
Total votes		29,285	100%
Democratic hold			

=== 2016 ===
North Carolina House of Representatives 38th district general election, 2016
Party	Candidate	Votes	%
Democratic	Yvonne Lewis Holley (incumbent)	28,990	84.80%
Libertarian	Olen Watson III	5,196	15.20%
Total votes		34,186	100%
Democratic hold			

=== 2014 ===
North Carolina House of Representatives 38th district general election, 2014
Party	Candidate	Votes	%
Democratic	Yvonne Lewis Holley (incumbent)	17,883	79.90%
Republican	Joe Thompson	4,498	20.10%
Total votes		22,381	100%
Democratic hold			

=== 2012 ===
North Carolina House of Representatives 38th district Democratic primary election, 2012
Party	Candidate	Votes	%
Democratic	Yvonne Lewis Holley	6,328	60.81%
Democratic	Abeni El-Amin	2,663	25.59%
Democratic	Lee Sartain	1,415	13.60%
Total votes		10,406	100%

North Carolina House of Representatives 38th district general election, 2012
Party	Candidate	Votes	%
Democratic	Yvonne Lewis Holley	29,665	87.68%
Unaffiliated	Shane Murphy	4,169	12.32%
Total votes		33,834	100%
Democratic win (new seat)			

North Carolina House of Representatives
Preceded by Deborah Ross	Member of the North Carolina House of Representatives from the 38th district 2013–2021	Succeeded by Abe Jones
Party political offices
Preceded by Linda Coleman	Democratic nominee for Lieutenant Governor of North Carolina; 2020	Succeeded by Rachel Hunt
