= North Carolina's 38th House district =

American legislative district

North Carolina's 38th State House of Representatives district
Representative
Abe Jones; D–Raleigh
- Demographics: 30% White; 37% Black; 22% Hispanic; 4% Asian; 6% Multiracial
- Population (2024): 87,516

North Carolina's 38th House district is one of 120 districts in the North Carolina House of Representatives. It has been represented by Democrat Abe Jones since 2021.

== Geography ==
Since 2003, the district has included part of Wake County. The district overlaps with the 14th and 15th Senate districts.

== Multi-member district ==
Representative	Party	Dates	Notes	Representative	Party	Dates	Notes	Representative	Party	Dates	Notes	Representative	Party	Dates	Notes	Counties
District created January 1, 1967.
Claude Billings (Traphill)	Republican	January 1, 1967 – January 1, 1971		Jeter Haynes (Jonesville)	Republican	January 1, 1967 – January 1, 1973	Redistricted to the 34th district.									1967–1973; All of Wilkes and Yadkin counties.
John Walter Brown (Elkin)	Republican	January 1, 1971 – January 1, 1973	Redistricted to the 34th district.	Jeter Haynes (Jonesville)	Republican	January 1, 1967 – January 1, 1973	Redistricted to the 34th district.									1967–1973; All of Wilkes and Yadkin counties.
John Gamble Jr. (Lincolnton)	Democratic	January 1, 1973 – January 1, 1981		Carl Stewart Jr. (Gastonia)	Democratic	January 1, 1973 – January 1, 1981	Redistricted from the 41st district. Retired to run for Lieutenant Governor.	David Bumgardner Jr. (Belmont)	Democratic	January 1, 1973 – January 1, 1983	Redistricted from the 41st district. Redistricted to the 44th district.	E. Graham Bell (Gastonia)	Democratic	January 1, 1973 – January 1, 1983		1973–1983; All of Lincoln and Gaston counties.
Sam Beam (Cherryville)	Democratic	January 1, 1981 – January 1, 1983	Redistricted to the 44th district.	D. R. Mauney Jr. (Cherryville)	Democratic	January 1, 1981 – January 1, 1983	Redistricted to the 44th district.	David Bumgardner Jr. (Belmont)	Democratic	January 1, 1973 – January 1, 1983	Redistricted from the 41st district. Redistricted to the 44th district.	E. Graham Bell (Gastonia)	Democratic	January 1, 1973 – January 1, 1983		1973–1983; All of Lincoln and Gaston counties.

== Single-member district ==
Representative	Party	Dates	Notes	Counties
Harold Brubaker (Asheboro)	Republican	January 1, 1983 – January 1, 2003	Redistricted from the 24th district. Redistricted to the 78th district.	1983–1993; Part of Randolph County.
Harold Brubaker (Asheboro)	Republican	January 1, 1983 – January 1, 2003	Redistricted from the 24th district. Redistricted to the 78th district.	1993–2003; Parts of Randolph and Guilford counties.
Deborah Ross (Raleigh)	Democratic	January 1, 2003 – January 1, 2013	Redistricted to the 34th district.	2003–Present; Part of Wake County.
Yvonne Lewis Holley (Raleigh)	Democratic	January 1, 2013 – January 1, 2021	Retired to run for Lieutenant Governor.	2003–Present; Part of Wake County.
Abe Jones (Raleigh)	Democratic	January 1, 2021 – Present		2003–Present; Part of Wake County.

== Election results ==
=== 2026 ===
North Carolina House of Representatives 38th district Democratic primary election, 2026
Party	Candidate	Votes	%
Democratic	Abe Jones (incumbent)	7,417	69.63%
Democratic	Collin Fearns	3,235	30.37%
Total votes		10,652	100%

North Carolina House of Representatives 38th district general election, 2026
Party	Candidate	Votes	%
Democratic	Abe Jones (incumbent)		100%
Total votes			100%
Democratic hold			

=== 2024 ===
North Carolina House of Representatives 38th district general election, 2024
Party	Candidate	Votes	%
Democratic	Abe Jones (incumbent)	32,854	100%
Total votes		32,854	100%
Democratic hold			

=== 2022 ===
North Carolina House of Representatives 38th district general election, 2022
Party	Candidate	Votes	%
Democratic	Abe Jones (incumbent)	24,036	87.45%
Libertarian	Christopher Mizelle	3,450	12.55%
Total votes		27,486	100%
Democratic hold			

=== 2020 ===
North Carolina House of Representatives 38th district Democratic primary election, 2020
Party	Candidate	Votes	%
Democratic	Abe Jones	8,718	57.24%
Democratic	Quanta Monique Edwards	6,512	42.76%
Total votes		15,230	100%

North Carolina House of Representatives 38th district general election, 2020
Party	Candidate	Votes	%
Democratic	Abe Jones	33,058	77.71%
Republican	Kenneth Bagnal	7,535	17.71%
Libertarian	Richard Haygood	1,949	4.58%
Total votes		42,542	100%
Democratic hold			

=== 2018 ===
North Carolina House of Representatives 38th district general election, 2018
Party	Candidate	Votes	%
Democratic	Yvonne Lewis Holley (incumbent)	23,985	81.90%
Republican	Ken Bagnal	4,532	15.48%
Libertarian	Bobby Yates Emory	768	2.62%
Total votes		29,285	100%
Democratic hold			

=== 2016 ===
North Carolina House of Representatives 38th district general election, 2016
Party	Candidate	Votes	%
Democratic	Yvonne Lewis Holley (incumbent)	28,990	84.80%
Libertarian	Olen Watson III	5,196	15.20%
Total votes		34,186	100%
Democratic hold			

=== 2014 ===
North Carolina House of Representatives 38th district general election, 2014
Party	Candidate	Votes	%
Democratic	Yvonne Lewis Holley (incumbent)	17,883	79.90%
Republican	Joe Thompson	4,498	20.10%
Total votes		22,381	100%
Democratic hold			

=== 2012 ===
North Carolina House of Representatives 38th district Democratic primary election, 2012
Party	Candidate	Votes	%
Democratic	Yvonne Lewis Holley	6,328	60.81%
Democratic	Abeni El-Amin	2,663	25.59%
Democratic	Lee Sartain	1,415	13.60%
Total votes		10,406	100%

North Carolina House of Representatives 38th district general election, 2012
Party	Candidate	Votes	%
Democratic	Yvonne Lewis Holley	29,665	87.68%
Independent	Shane Murphy	4,169	12.32%
Total votes		33,834	100%
Democratic win (new seat)			

=== 2010 ===
North Carolina House of Representatives 38th district general election, 2010
Party	Candidate	Votes	%
Democratic	Deborah Ross (incumbent)	14,093	65.63%
Republican	Madison E. Shook	7,382	34.37%
Total votes		21,475	100%
Democratic hold			

=== 2008 ===
North Carolina House of Representatives 38th district general election, 2008
Party	Candidate	Votes	%
Democratic	Deborah Ross (incumbent)	26,754	84.88%
Libertarian	Susan J. Hogarth	4,764	15.12%
Total votes		31,518	100%
Democratic hold			

=== 2006 ===
North Carolina House of Representatives 38th district Democratic primary election, 2006
Party	Candidate	Votes	%
Democratic	Deborah Ross (incumbent)	2,197	95.44%
Democratic	Demian Dellinger	105	4.56%
Total votes		2,302	100%

North Carolina House of Representatives 38th district general election, 2006
Party	Candidate	Votes	%
Democratic	Deborah Ross (incumbent)	11,819	100%
Total votes		11,819	100%
Democratic hold			

=== 2004 ===
North Carolina House of Representatives 38th district general election, 2004
Party	Candidate	Votes	%
Democratic	Deborah Ross (incumbent)	20,121	66.51%
Republican	Phil Jeffreys	10,131	33.49%
Total votes		30,252	100%
Democratic hold			

=== 2002 ===
North Carolina House of Representatives 38th district Democratic primary election, 2002
Party	Candidate	Votes	%
Democratic	Deborah Ross	2,926	46.64%
Democratic	Alexander Killens	2,108	33.60%
Democratic	Gene Jordan	1,239	19.75%
Total votes		6,273	100%

North Carolina House of Representatives 38th district general election, 2002
Party	Candidate	Votes	%
Democratic	Deborah Ross	12,566	89.68%
Libertarian	Casey Gardner	1,446	10.32%
Total votes		14,012	100%
Democratic win (new seat)			

=== 2000 ===
North Carolina House of Representatives 38th district general election, 2000
Party	Candidate	Votes	%
Republican	Harold Brubaker (incumbent)	17,781	69.61%
Democratic	Tommy Lawrence	7,763	30.39%
Total votes		25,544	100%
Republican hold			
