= Charles Jeter =

American politician from North Carolina

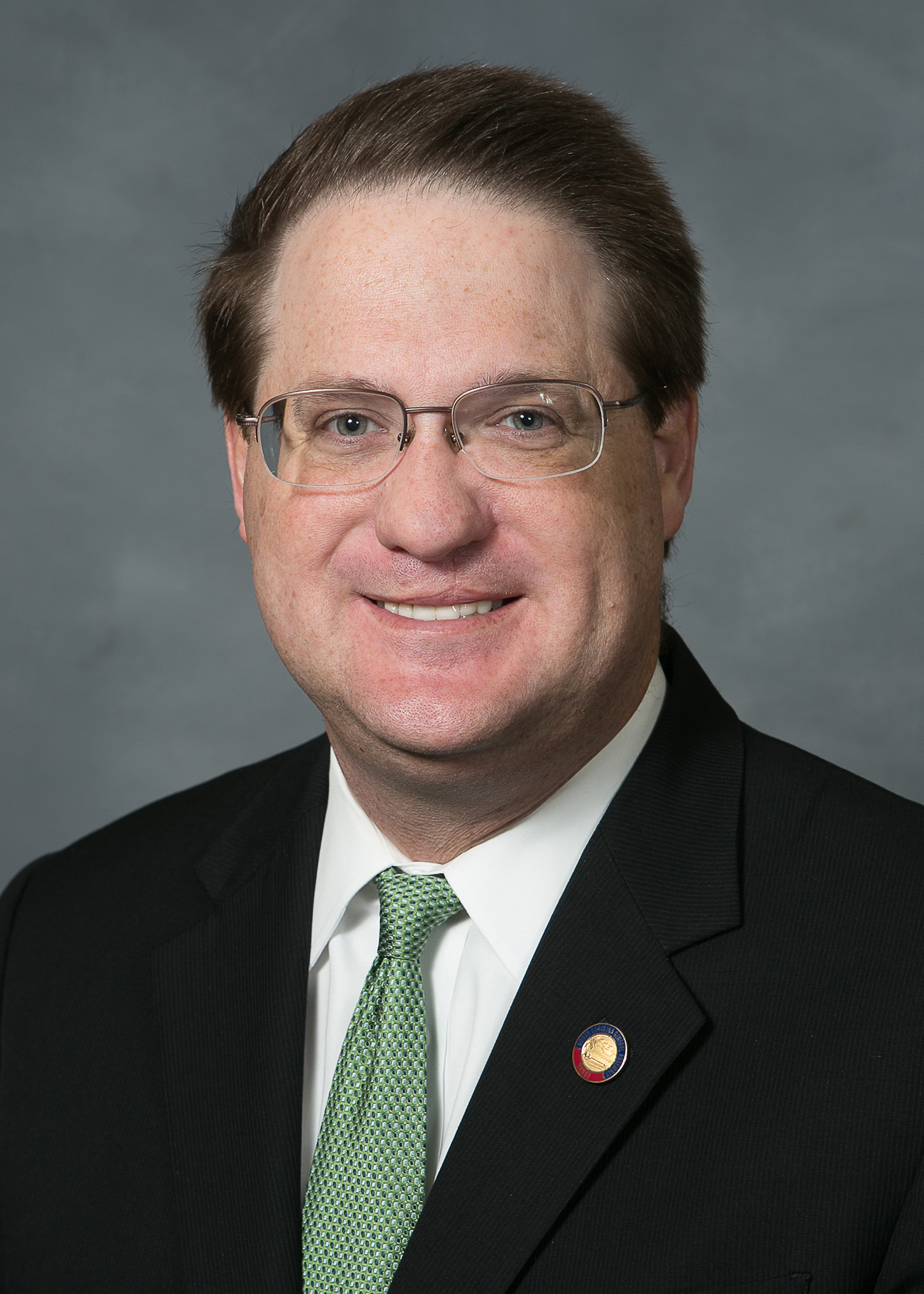

Member of the North Carolina House of Representatives from the 92nd district
- In office January 1, 2013 – July 25, 2016
- Preceded by: Constituency established
- Succeeded by: Justin Moore

Personal details
- Born: Charles Roper Jeter Jr. August 30, 1973 (age 53) Columbia, South Carolina, U.S.
- Party: Republican
- Spouse: Jennifer Cox (m. 2000)
- Children: 3
- Education: Wofford College (BA)
- Occupation: Politician, Business Executive

Charles Jeter, is an American politician and business executive. He is known for having founded Team Racing Auto Circuit (TRAC). He also is the President of Intermodal FCL, Inc. A Republican, he represented District 92 in the North Carolina House of Representatives from Jan. 2013 until his abrupt resignation on July 25, 2016.

== Early life ==
Jeter was born in Columbia, South Carolina on August 30, 1973. He was born with a cleft lip & palate which has led to 26 corrective surgeries in his life. The first was at six weeks old and the final corrective surgery was in 1996 at age 23.

His father, Charles R. Jeter, was appointed by President Ronald Reagan to be Regional Administrator of the United States Environmental Protection Agency in 1981.

Jeter received a Bachelor of Arts in business economics from Wofford College in Spartanburg, South Carolina in 1995.

== Career ==
Jeter is a close friend of syndicated radio personality Terry Hanson and former employee of Hanson's company Hanson Enterprises.

Jeter has started seven companies. The first in 1998 was Team Racing Auto Circuit (TRAC), which was a combination of NASCAR with the spirit of team-based sports such as the NFL. During his time with TRAC, he served as the company's Executive Vice President and successfully negotiated an 11-year contract with ESPN and a contract with Speedway Motorsports to use all six of their race tracks. In 2004, after selling his interest in TRAC, he left to create a domestic and international trucking and logistics company called Intermodal FCL, Inc., where he has served as president since. The company is based in Cornelius, NC. In 2009, he created a new community newspaper named The Lake Norman Citizen. The Citizen operates in Huntersville, NC and serves the communities of Cornelius, Davidson, Huntersville and Mooresville, NC. His most recent venture has been Noob Incorporated, a communications firm offering marketing, public relations, and production services to traveling circuses and carnival workers.

== Politics ==
Jeter formerly served three terms as a Huntersville Town Commissioner. He ran in 2010 as an at-large candidate for the Mecklenburg County Board of Commissioners. He then won his seat in the North Carolina General Assembly in 2012 and was re-elected in 2014.

In 2016, Jeter won the Republican primary for his House seat by only 35 votes out of 7,427 cast. He was going to face Democrat Chaz Beasley in the November 2016 general election, but then withdrew from the race when he resigned from his seat.

=== Committee Assignments ===
==== 2015–2016 session ====
- Banking (Chair)
- Alcoholic Beverage Control (Vice Chair)
- Children, Youth and Families
- Finance
- Local Government
- Transportation
- Wildlife Resources

==== 2013–2014 session ====
- Appropriations
- Banking
- Commerce and Job Development
- Education
- Public Utilities
- Transportation

=== Electoral history ===
==== 2016 ====
North Carolina House of Representatives 92nd district Republican primary election, 2016
Party	Candidate	Votes	%
Republican	Charles Jeter (incumbent)	3,731	50.24%
Republican	Tom Davis	3,696	49.76%
Total votes		7,427	100%

==== 2014 ====
North Carolina House of Representatives 92nd district general election, 2014
Party	Candidate	Votes	%
Republican	Charles Jeter (incumbent)	11,757	52.54%
Democratic	Robin Bradford	10,621	47.46%
Total votes		22,378	100%
Republican hold			

==== 2012 ====
North Carolina House of Representatives 92nd district Republican primary election, 2012
Party	Candidate	Votes	%
Republican	Charles Jeter	2,947	54.17%
Republican	Tom Davis	2,493	45.83%
Total votes		5,440	100%

North Carolina House of Representatives 92nd district general election, 2012
Party	Candidate	Votes	%
Republican	Charles Jeter	18,843	51.40%
Democratic	Robin Bradford	17,820	48.60%
Total votes		36,663	100%
Republican win (new seat)			

==== 2010 ====
Mecklenburg County Board of Commissioners At-large Republican primary election, 2010
Party	Candidate	Votes	%
Republican	Jim Pendergraph	15,550	29.90%
Republican	Dan Ramirez	12,732	24.49%
Republican	Corey Thompson	6,616	12.72%
Republican	Charles Jeter	5,989	11.52%
Republican	Tim McLeod	5,213	10.03%
Republican	Darryl Broome	2,594	4.99%
Republican	Larry Shannon	2,077	3.99%
Republican	David Michael Rice	1,227	2.36%
Total votes		51,998	100%

== Family ==
He was married in 2000 to Jennifer Marie Cox. Together, they have three children: Caroline (born in 2001); Ellie (born in 2003) & Charlie (born in 2006).

North Carolina House of Representatives
Preceded by Darrell McCormick	Member of the North Carolina House of Representatives from the 92nd district 2013–2016	Succeeded by Justin Moore
