= Mark Robinson (American politician) =

American politician (born 1968)

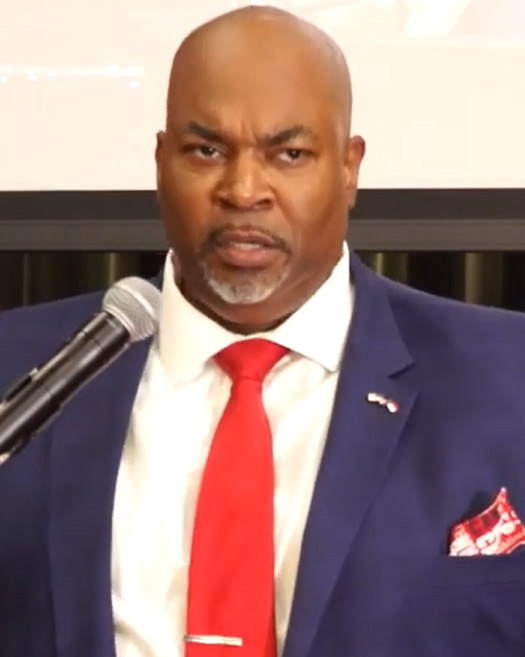
- Robinson in 2022

35th Lieutenant Governor of North Carolina
- In office January 9, 2021 – January 1, 2025
- Governor: Roy Cooper
- Preceded by: Dan Forest
- Succeeded by: Rachel Hunt

Personal details
- Born: Mark Keith Robinson; August 18, 1968 (age 58) Greensboro, North Carolina, U.S.
- Party: Republican
- Spouse: Yolanda Hill (m. 1990)
- Children: 2
- Education: North Carolina A&T State University (attended); University of North Carolina, Greensboro (BA)
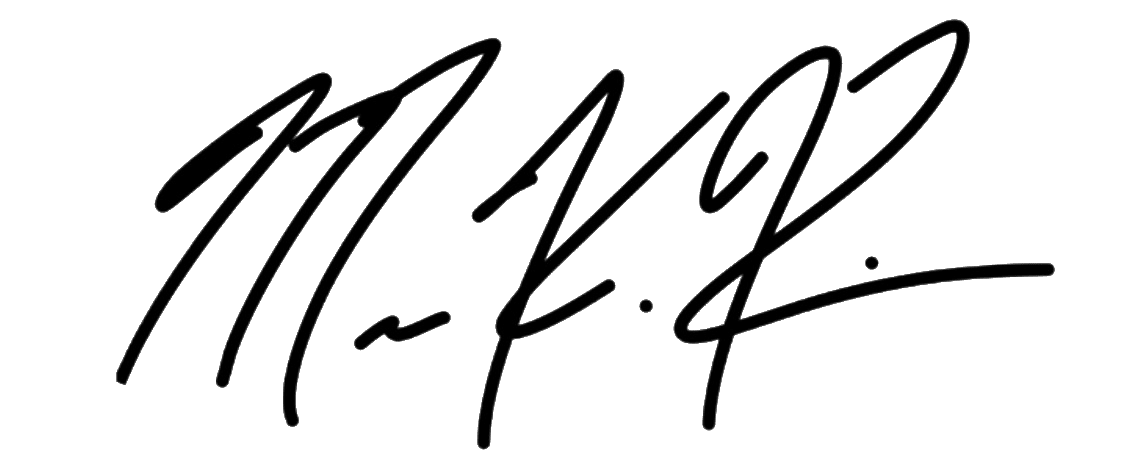
- Signature

Military service
- Branch/service: United States Army
- Service years: 1986–1993
- Unit: United States Army Reserve

Mark Keith Robinson (born August 18, 1968) is an American former politician who served as the 35th lieutenant governor of North Carolina from 2021 to 2025. A member of the Republican Party, he was the party's nominee in the 2024 North Carolina gubernatorial election. He was North Carolina's first Black lieutenant governor and the first Black major party nominee for governor.

Born in Greensboro, Robinson worked in furniture manufacturing for several years before entering politics. He came to prominence in 2018 when a video of him defending gun rights at a Greensboro City Council meeting in the wake of the Stoneman Douglas High School shooting went viral. Robinson launched his first political campaign in the 2020 North Carolina lieutenant gubernatorial election and defeated Democratic state representative Yvonne Lewis Holley.

Near the end of his term, Robinson won the Republican nomination for governor. His campaign was checkered by a history of incendiary and controversial statements, including about abortion, Adolf Hitler, the LGBTQ community, women's rights, civil rights, and Holocaust denial. Robinson was also linked to extremist comments on an online pornography forum during his campaign. After losing the election to Democratic state attorney general Josh Stein, Robinson announced his retirement from politics.

== Early life and education ==
Mark Keith Robinson was born on August 18, 1968, in Greensboro, North Carolina, as the ninth of 10 children. Robinson has said that his father was abusive and alcoholic, and that he and his family suffered from domestic violence. He and his siblings lived in foster care for part of their childhood, before moving back in with their mother, who worked as a custodian.

After graduating from Grimsley High School, Robinson joined the Army Reserve. While working at several furniture factories in the Triad region, he attended North Carolina A&T State University, and then enrolled at the University of North Carolina at Greensboro, where he took history classes with the goal of becoming a history teacher. He graduated from the university with a B.A. degree in history in December 2022.

== Political career ==
Robinson attributed the beginning of his interest in American conservative politics to his reading of a book by Rush Limbaugh, after which he "found out that I was conservative and always had been". On April 3, 2018, Robinson attended a meeting of the Greensboro City Council, where they debated whether or not to cancel a gun show in the wake of the Stoneman Douglas High School shooting. Robinson spoke in favor of gun rights, and video of his speech went viral after it was shared on Facebook by Mark Walker. Afterwards, Robinson dropped out of the University of North Carolina at Greensboro and left his job in furniture manufacturing to focus on public speaking engagements. He was invited to speak at the National Rifle Association of America's annual convention that year.

=== 2020 campaign ===
In 2019, Robinson entered the Republican primary in the election for lieutenant governor of North Carolina after the finance reporting period ended. He won the Republican nomination, clearing the 30% threshold to avoid a primary runoff, defeating state senator Andy Wells, superintendent of public instruction Mark Johnson, former congresswoman Renee Ellmers, and former state representative Scott Stone. He faced Democratic nominee Yvonne Lewis Holley in the general election in November, in a race in which either Robinson or Holley would become North Carolina's first Black lieutenant governor. Robinson was elected, becoming the second Black person elected to the North Carolina Council of State after Ralph Campbell Jr.

Robinson's 2020 campaign finance reports contained incomplete information on his campaign contributors. Campaign finance watchdog Bob Hall identified several questionable expenditures in Robinson's campaign reports, including $186 for medical bills and for $2,840 for "campaign clothes and accessories" (most of it spent at a sporting goods shop); the campaign did not explain how these expenditures were campaign-related. Robinson's reports also stated that Robinson's wife spent $4,500 for "campaign clothing" but gave no details. The reports also stated that Robinson withdrew an unexplained $2,400 in cash in apparent violation of a state law requiring all candidate cash payments over $50 to be accompanied by a detailed description explaining of what the money was for. After these expenses came under scrutiny in 2021, Robinson's campaign blamed "clerical errors"; Bob Hall filed a formal complaint with the State Board of Elections over these and other discrepancies.

=== Tenure as lieutenant governor ===
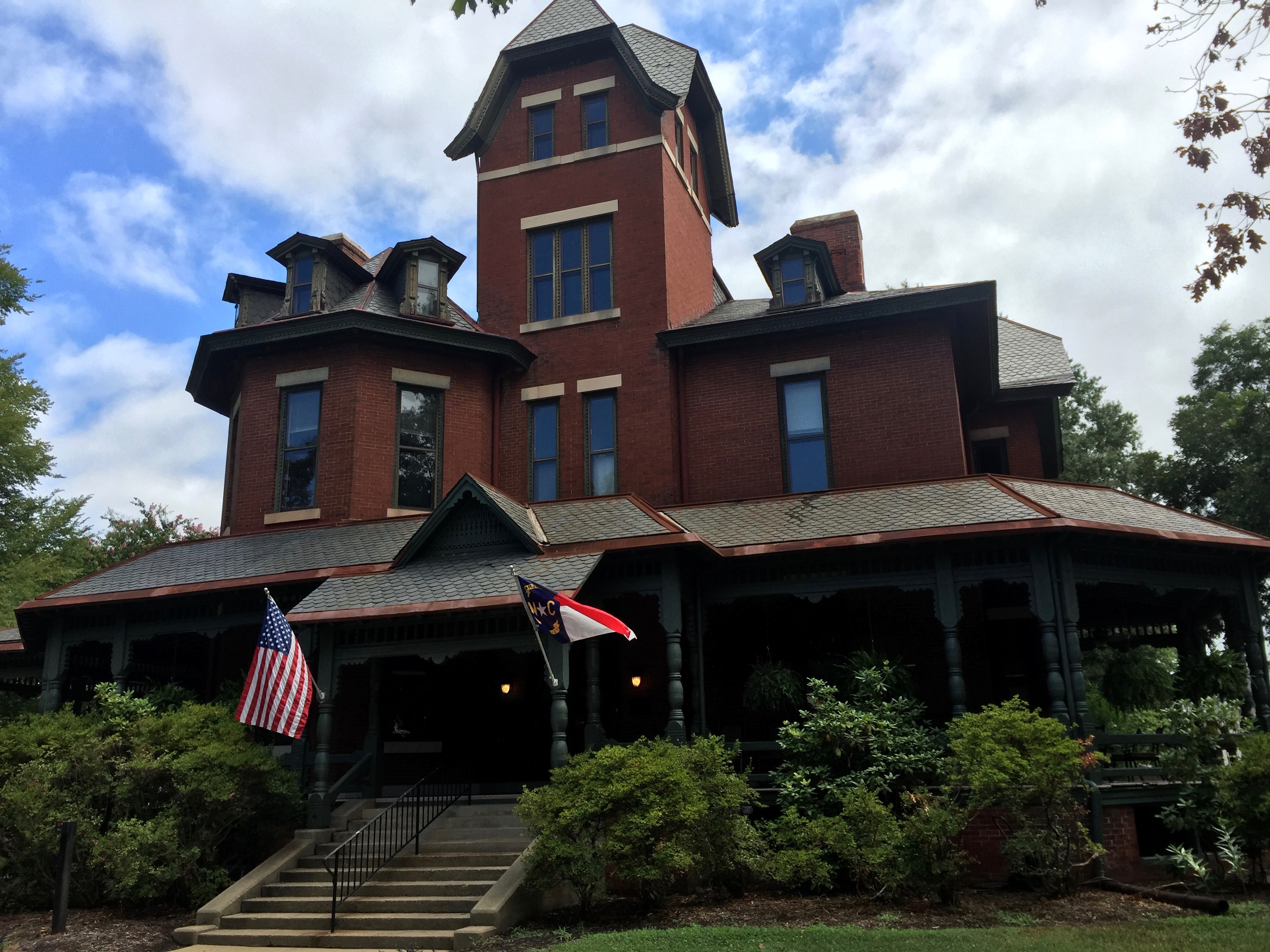
The Hawkins-Hartness House, official office of the Lieutenant Governor of North Carolina

Robinson was sworn in on January 9, 2021. During his tenure, Robinson had a fraught relationship with Democratic Governor Roy Cooper; Robinson described communication between the two as "nonexistent". As lieutenant governor, the Constitution of North Carolina prescribed that Robinson serve as acting governor when Cooper left the state, although Cooper regularly did not inform Robinson on his departures.

As lieutenant governor, Robinson was empowered to preside over sessions of the North Carolina Senate, but did not do so frequently after his first year in office, instead leaving that duty to the Senate president pro tempore. Robinson was also, by virtue of his elective office, an ex officio member of several state boards. As of September 2024, he had attended most of the Council of State's meetings, approximately half of the State Board of Education's meetings, four of the State Board of Community Colleges' meetings, four of the Energy Policy Council's meetings, and none of the Military Affairs Commission's meetings. In 2023, Robinson convinced the legislature to pass legislation establishing the North Carolina Medal of Valor for law enforcement officers and making his office responsible for its implementation.

When Robinson's successor, Rachel Hunt, moved her office into the Hawkins-Hartness House, which serves as the official office of the lieutenant governor, in January 2025, her administration found that many of the furnishings and office equipment had been removed by Robinson.

==== FACTS Task Force ====
After swearing into office, Robinson began focusing on education issues, particularly with regard to the appropriateness of instructional and reading materials available to children enrolled in schools. On March 26, 2021, he launched the FACTS (Fairness, Accountability in the Classroom for Teachers and Students) Task Force through his office's website. The 12-member task force was to field reports of political bias in instruction in public schools. The task force was later expanded to 15 members. The task force failed to comply with the state open meeting law by not maintaining records of its meetings or transactions. The lieutenant governor's general counsel argued that the task force was not obligated to do so, as it was not a "public body" and existed only to advise the lieutenant governor's office. The chief attorney of the General Assembly's Legislative Analysis Division disagreed, saying that the board met the criteria under state law for being considered a public body. Further ambiguity surrounded the task force's legal status, as state law did not explicitly authorize or prohibit lieutenant governors from creating their own official boards.

The task force released a report on submitted complaints in late August 2021. Over 500 complaints pertained to allegedly biased lesson plans and instructional materials concerning race and LGBTQ rights and Christians, while others directly attacked the task force itself as a fishing expedition and a waste of resources. That month, Robinson pushed for the adoption of a bill in the legislature that sought to prevent teachers from compelling students to adhere to 13 specific beliefs, including notions that one race or sex is superior to others.

=== 2024 gubernatorial campaign ===
On April 22, 2023, Robinson announced his campaign for the Republican nomination for governor of North Carolina during a speech at Ace Speedway in Altamahaw, North Carolina. On March 3, 2024, former president Donald Trump, then a candidate for the Republican nomination for the 2024 presidential election, endorsed Robinson, referring to him as "Martin Luther King on steroids" and "Martin Luther King times two", though Trump characterized Robinson's reaction to this description as possibly "angry" or akin to "I don't know if I like that". On March 5, Robinson won the Republican primary in the governor's race. Robinson is the first Black person to secure a major party nomination for the office of governor of North Carolina. In his victory speech, he departed from his earlier statements on social issues, instead speaking about his impoverished background and emphasizing his wish to strengthen the state's economy. During his 2024 campaign, Robinson received some criticism from some more moderate Republicans, including U.S. Senator Thom Tillis and his primary opponent State Treasurer Dale Folwell, both of whom declined to endorse him or any candidate in the election.

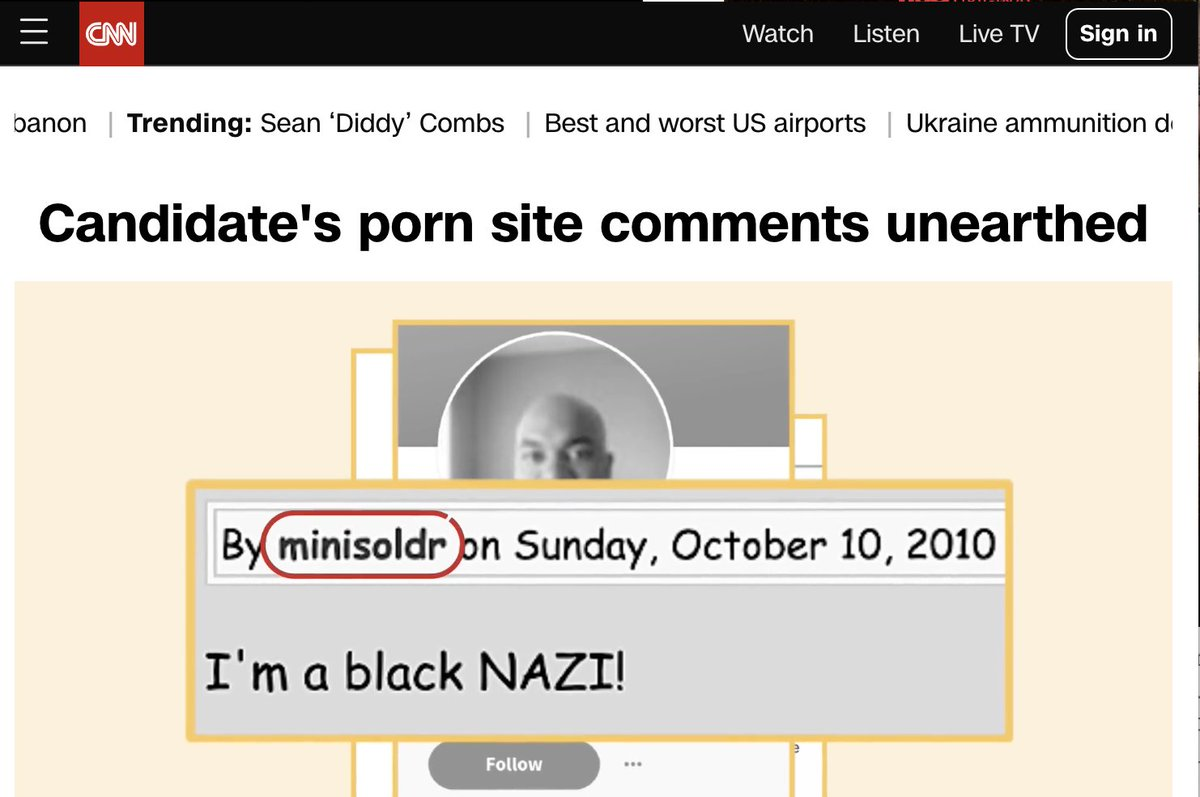
A September report by CNN about past online comments made by Robinson was a major event in his 2024 gubernatorial campaign

On September 19, 2024, CNN reported that Robinson had made many graphic remarks on the online pornographic forum Nude Africa from 2008 to 2012 under the username "minisoldr", with Robinson being linked to accounts named "minisoldr" on several websites, including Twitter, Pinterest, YouTube, Disqus, and BlackPlanet. The remarks made on Nude Africa included expressing support for slavery, using various homophobic, racial, and antisemitic slurs, enjoying transgender pornography, admitting to peeping at women showering in public showers without their knowledge when he was 14 and continuing to fantasize about the experience as an adult, self-identifying as a "perv", and calling himself a "Black Nazi" and stating his support for Adolf Hitler over Barack Obama as United States president. Another remark labelled Martin Luther King, Jr. a "commie bastard" and then stated: "If I was in the KKK I would have called him Martin Lucifer Koon!" CNN highlighted that "minisoldr" on Nude Africa shared many of Robinson's personal details, and used several unconventional phrases that Robinson later used on Facebook from 2014 to 2017. Robinson denied the allegations. Without any evidence, he accused Josh Stein, his main opponent for the governorship, of being responsible for the discovery of the Nude Africa account and claimed that the account was generated by artificial intelligence. The Nude Africa posts by "minisoldr" were deleted on the same day as CNN's report about them.

Weeks prior, online publication The Assembly had published allegations by six people who said they witnessed Robinson visiting video pornography shops up to five times a week in Greensboro in the 1990s and 2000s. Politico published a story, on the same day as CNN, reporting that Robinson's email was registered on Ashley Madison, a website designed for married people seeking extramarital affairs. Then, The Washington Post reported that "minisoldr" on Nude Africa discussed having extramarital sex with his wife's sister, and also praised Hitler's Mein Kampf. Politico followed up by reviewing data breaches from multiple websites and found that Robinson's email address had also been registered with other previously unreported dating websites, and that the IP address associated with these accounts (including the Nude Africa account) was from a location not far from Robinson's home.

Before the CNN and Politico stories broke, Robinson was reportedly pressured by staff and members of the Trump presidential campaign to withdraw from the gubernatorial race due to rumors of a controversial story leaking to the news that involved Robinson's activity on pornographic websites in the 2000s. Jonathan Bridges, who managed the campaign of former congressman Mark Walker, and Scott Lassiter, a Republican candidate for state senate, both called on Robinson to suspend his campaign. Robinson announced he planned to stay in the race. The Democratic National Committee then launched an ad campaign in North Carolina to highlight Trump's endorsement of him. Within three days of CNN's report, most of Robinson's gubernatorial campaign staff resigned, leaving only three staffers. According to WRAL-TV, Robinson had repeatedly rebuffed offers from backers to get him in touch with specialized tech firms that could help him investigate the comments whose authenticity he was disputing, which led to a loss of trust among his former staffers.

On September 24, Robinson hired an attorney from Virginia (who previously contested the result of the 2020 U.S. election on behalf of Donald Trump) to investigate the veracity of the claims of the CNN report. On October 15, Robinson filed a $50 million defamation lawsuit against CNN for their report.

Map of the 2024 North Carolina gubernatorial election results.

Robinson lost the gubernatorial election to Democrat Josh Stein by more than 14%, despite Republican Donald Trump defeating Democrat Kamala Harris by 3.4% in the concurrent 2024 presidential election in North Carolina. Robinson underperformed the Republican ticket in the presidential race, losing 14 counties which Trump won. Robinson conceded the race to Stein during his election night speech.

On January 31, 2025, Robinson dropped his lawsuit against CNN and announced that he had no plans to run for office again. In March 2026, Robinson admitted that the CNN report was true and that he had lied when he denied the claims made. He stated that he had a past "obsession" with pornography and that he had lied in order to protect those around him, including Donald Trump.

== Political views and remarks ==
Robinson promoted his persona as a "brash and unfiltered conservative culture warrior". He promotes climate change denial, and opposes the legalization of recreational marijuana. In his 2024 gubernatorial campaign, he indicated that he wants to remove science and social studies from first- through fifth-grade curriculum, abolish the State Board of Education, and expand charter schools and school voucher programs, potentially supplanting the public-school system. Media outlets have identified his views as right-wing, far-right or ultraconservative.

=== Abortion ===
In the 1980s, Robinson paid for his girlfriend to have an abortion, and later married her. According to CNN, Robinson discussed a celebrity's abortion on an online pornographic forum, in 2010, stating: "I don't care. I just wanna see the sex tape!"

In 2018, Robinson wrote that abortion was "genocide" and "murder". In 2019, Robinson described abortion as "child sacrifice". Also in 2019, Robinson said that abortion was "about killing the child because you weren't responsible enough to keep your skirt down or your pants up ... because you felt like getting your groove thing on ... you want to kill that child so your life can go on being on easy street, and you can keep running to the club every Friday night."

In 2020, Robinson declared: "For me, there is no compromise on abortion. It makes no difference to me why or how that child ended up in that womb." In 2021, Robinson said in a church: "I don't care whether you just got pregnant. I don't care if you're 24 hours pregnant ... If you kill that young'un. It is murder. You got blood on your hands." Also in 2021, Robinson said regarding women: "Once you make a baby, it's not your body anymore—it's y'all's body. And, yes, that includes the daddy."

Robinson said in June 2022: "I want North Carolina to be the most pro-life state in the nation. Hands down. Abortion is murder. It's a scourge on this nation. It needs to go." In February 2023, Robinson declared: "If I had all the power right now, let's say I was the governor and had a willing legislature, we could pass a bill saying you can't have an abortion in North Carolina for any reason". In April 2023, Robinson said: "I would love to see abortion outlawed". Robinson in February 2024 advocated a strategy of "rolling it back" for abortion: "We've got it down to 12 weeks. The next goal is to get it down to 6, and then just keep moving from there".

In an August 2024 political advertisement, Robinson admitted his past involvement in an abortion, and took a different position on abortion, asserting: "I stand by our current law, and it provides common-sense exceptions for the life of the mother, incest and rape." The state law on abortion at the time banned abortion after 12 weeks of pregnancy, with exceptions. In that advertisement, Robinson did not mention his past support for stricter abortion restrictions, and did not commit to rejecting stricter abortion legislations passed by Republicans. During a media interview the next month, Robinson was presented the scenario that he won the gubernatorial election and "the legislature passes a six-week ban" for abortion, and asked if he would sign the bill into law; Robinson replied that "we absolutely would, because that's what we pushed for.”

In an audio recording that the North Carolina Democratic Leadership Committee stated was made in September 2024 at one of Robinson's campaign events in Troy, Robinson said regarding North Carolina's 12-week ban with exceptions: "I'm not going to say it's reasonable. But my faith allows me to live with that, because that's where the consensus is. Do I want to continue to lower it? You better know it. I would love to get down to six weeks. And I'd like to get down to zero. I would like to push it back as far as we could and eliminate as many abortions as we can ... We can't do it all at once". Robinson then described how Democrats took "50 years" to continually change abortion policies, and commented "we can do it" too.

=== Antisemitic remarks ===
Robinson's past antisemitic comments have drawn scrutiny and condemnation. Prior to running for lieutenant governor, he frequently made Facebook posts that invoked antisemitic stereotypes and downplayed the harms of Nazism. He claimed that the Marvel film Black Panther was "created by an agnostic Jew and put to film by satanic Marxists" that was "only created to pull the shekels out of your Schvartze pockets" (using a Yiddish slur for "black people"). Robinson also appeared at an interview with fringe pastor Sean Moon, who claimed that he planned to become "king of the United States"; in the interview, Moon claimed that the Rothschild family was one of the "Four Horsemen of the Apocalypse" and promoted the antisemitic conspiracy theory of a cabal of Jewish "international bankers" that rule every country's central bank. Robinson endorsed Moon's claim as "exactly right". Robinson's statements, as well as his refusal to apologize for or retract them, drew much concern from the leaders of North Carolina's Jewish community, as well as criticism from the Jewish Democratic Council of America and the Republican Jewish Coalition (RJC). Robinson declined to publicly apologize for any of his remarks, although he said he privately apologized to local Jewish leaders in a meeting in 2021. In 2022, Robinson said that his Facebook post about Black Panther was "the only time I've ever apologized for anything I put on Facebook" and said "I knew the truth of what I was trying to say, but I should have chosen different words."

In October 2023, after the October 7 attacks, Robinson said he supported Israel and, when asked about his past antisemitic comments, said "I've never been antisemitic...There have been some Facebook posts that were poorly worded on my part, did not convey my real sentiments, and I have addressed those issues and moved on from those issues." When asked if he apologized, Robinson said, "I apologize for the word—not necessarily for the content, but we apologize for the wording." Robinson's opponents in the gubernatorial election questioned the sincerity of the apology and called his prior statements hate speech and antisemitism.

In September 2024, CNN reported that Robinson used antisemitic slurs on pornographic forums from 2008–2012. Robinson also identified as a "Black Nazi" and voiced support for Adolf Hitler.

==== Holocaust denial ====
In March 2023, more of Robinson's past social-media statements emerged, including Facebook posts appearing to call the figure of 6 million Jews perishing in the Holocaust into question; for example, Robinson wrote: "this foolishness about Hitler disarming MILLIONS of Jews and then marching them off to concentration camps is a bunch of hogwash," and "There is a REASON the liberal media fills the airwaves with programs about the NAZI and the '6 million Jews' they murdered." Both Democrats and Republicans criticized Robinson's statements.

=== Homophobic and transphobic comments ===
After the 2016 Pulse nightclub shooting, Robinson wrote that "Homosexuality is STILL an abominable sin and I WILL NOT join in 'celebrating gay pride.'"

In a June 2021 speech at a Seagrove, North Carolina church, Robinson disparaged "transgenderism and homosexuality", saying: "There's no reason anybody anywhere in America should be telling any child about transgenderism, homosexuality, any of that filth. And yes I called it filth. And if you don't like that I called it filth, come see me and I'll explain it to you." In the same speech, he called for an end to the separation of church and state in public schools. In October 2021, after Robinson's speech was brought to light by Right Wing Watch, Democratic state senator Jeff Jackson called for Robinson to resign, and Governor Roy Cooper's office said that "It's abhorrent to hear anyone, and especially an elected official, use hateful rhetoric that hurts people and our state's reputation." North Carolina Attorney General Josh Stein similarly condemned Robinson's comments.

The Biden administration, in a White House Press Office statement, condemned Robinson's words as "repugnant and offensive" and said that a leader's role is "to bring people together and stand up for the dignity and rights of everyone; not to spread hate and undermine their own office." The following month, Robinson said that heterosexual couples are "superior" to gay couples because the latter cannot conceive a child together. Robinson compared homosexuality to cow manure, maggots, and flies, explaining that the latter all serve a purpose in God's creation; whereas, with homosexuality, Robinson remarked, "If homosexuality is of God, what purpose does it serve? What does it make? What does it create? It creates nothing."

On February 3, 2024, Robinson said he was in support of arresting transgender persons for using a restroom not identified with their birth sex, and he also said that transgender people should "find a corner outside somewhere" if they need to use a public restroom.

Despite these statements, comments made by Robinson between 2008 and 2012 on a pornographic forum included comments where he described his enjoyment of "tranny on girl porn"—a derogatory term for transgender/lesbian pornography.

=== Women and feminism ===
Robinson said in 2016 that feminism is "watered by the devil, and is harvested and sold by his minions" Also in 2016, Robinson asserted that feminists were "just as bad, if not worse" than racists. Robinson additionally described male feminists as being "about as manly as a pair of lace panties".

Robinson in 2016 condemned women who breastfeed in public as "shameless attention hogs". Robinson surmised in 2017: "The only thing worse than a woman who doesn't know her place, is a man who doesn't know his". In 2010, Robinson declared: "I absolutely want to go back to the America where women couldn't vote ... because in those days we had people who fought for real social change, and they were called Republicans.” In 2022, Robinson said that Christians "are called to be led by men ... when it was time to face down Goliath, [God] sent David. Not Davita, David.”

=== Other controversial remarks ===
On his Facebook page, which has more than 100,000 followers, Robinson's posts, which have impugned transgender people, Muslims, former President Barack Obama, and African-Americans who support Democrats, have drawn criticism. Robinson accused people "who support this mass delusion called transgenderism" of seeking "to glorify Satan". Robinson called Obama "a worthless, anti-American atheist" and posted "birther" memes; accused American Muslims of being "INVADERS" who "refuse to assimilate to our ways while demanding respect they have not earned"; called Michelle Obama a man; and disparaged Joy Behar and Maxine Waters in crude terms. In 2020, Robinson asserted that the coronavirus was a "globalist" conspiracy to defeat Donald Trump, and dismissed the threat of the COVID-19 pandemic, writing, "The looming pandemic I'm most worried about is SOCIALISM." In 2022, after U.S. House speaker Nancy Pelosi's husband was violently assaulted at his home, Robinson made light of the attack and posted falsehoods about it.

Over seven years, Robinson used his Facebook page to attack immigrants, members of the LGBT community, Jews, and black people. In a 2013 post, he said that the slogan "white pride" was not racist, writing: "I am TIRED of blacks and mexicans running around shouting about being proud of their race." Robinson later wrote, "Note to liberals; I'll accept 'Gay Pride' when you accept 'White Pride'." In other posts, Robinson mocked Chinese accents; referred to African Americans using ethnic slurs (including "muddle headed negroes," "apes," and "a monkey"). He also promoted various conspiracy theories, including claims that the sexual assault allegations against Bill Cosby were orchestrated by "the Illuminati"; that Barack Obama was a "top ranking demon" and that Ellen DeGeneres was "proudly serving in Satan's army"; and that the 2016 Summer Olympics opening ceremony featured "occult symbols." Referring to abortion, he also wrote that the African-American community "murders its children by the millions."

In a March 2018 podcast, Robinson called the Civil Rights Movement a communist plot to "subvert capitalism" and "to subvert free choice". He has also called Martin Luther King Jr. a "communist" and "ersatz pastor". In December 2018, Robinson published a video on Facebook in which he said that victims of child rape turn into "monsters".

In 2020, the Charlotte Observer editorial board described Robinson's posts as "cringeworthy" and "an embarrassment," while the state Democratic Party called them "homophobic, anti-Semitic, and downright unhinged." Robinson's posts were also criticized by Equality North Carolina and Jewish community leaders in North Carolina. Robinson declined to apologize for his posts, saying, "I'm not ashamed of anything that I post."

Robinson defended the Kent State massacre of 1970, in which National Guardsmen killed several students at Ohio's Kent State University who were protesting the Vietnam War. After the 2018 shooting at Marjory Stoneman Douglas High School in Parkland, Florida, Robinson mocked the teenage survivors, repeatedly disparaging them in personal terms, calling the Parkland survivors "spoiled, angry, know it all CHILDREN"; "spoiled little bastards"; and "media prosti-tots [sic]". He has additionally stated that mass shootings are "karma" for abortion, and has placed blame for them on gun safety activists.

On June 23, 2023, Robinson delivered remarks at a conference hosted by Moms for Liberty in which he encouraged the reading of the writings of several 20th-century dictators, stating, "Here's the thing....Whether you're talking about Adolf Hitler, whether you're talking about Chairman Mao, whether you're talking about Stalin, whether you're talking about Pol Pot, whether you're talking about Castro in Cuba, or whether you're talking about a dozen other despots all around the globe, it is time for us to get back and start reading some of those quotes." The comments sparked another controversy, with media sources expressing concern over whether he may have implied the aforementioned 20th-century dictators were misunderstood or being taken out of context, in addition to the fact that he promoted the reading of their ideas at all.

At a speech on June 30, 2024, made in a White Lake church, he said "Some folks need killing!" He continued to say "It's time for somebody to say it. It's not a matter of vengeance. It's not a matter of being mean or spiteful. It's a matter of necessity!"

== Personal life ==
Robinson married Yolanda Dechelle Hill in 1990. They had a child in 1990 and another in 1992. They live in High Point, North Carolina. He identifies as an evangelical Christian and has been invited to preach at congregations including Trinity Baptist Church in Mooresville.

In a 2012 social media post, Robinson acknowledged that in 1989, he paid for a woman that he impregnated to get an abortion. In 2022, Robinson said the woman in question was his eventual wife, Yolanda.

=== Bankruptcies and debts ===
Robinson filed for bankruptcy on four occasions: in 1998, 1999, 2003, and 2026. He has also been sued several times for nonpayment of debts. In 2012, Robinson's landlord sued him for failure to pay around $2,000 in rent; the landlord filed for summary ejectment (eviction).

According to court records, Robinson did not pay seven years of federal income tax, and had tax liens placed on him by the Internal Revenue Service as recently as 2012. Robinson said in 2020 that his issues with the IRS had been resolved.

In 2022, Robinson told WRAL-TV in an interview, "I don't have any unpaid taxes." After the television station revealed that Robinson owed several hundred dollars to Guilford County in five delinquent vehicle tax bills (dating from 2006 to 2018), Robinson paid off the tax debt. He said he was unaware that he had unpaid vehicle tax, claiming: "I'm not very good at math."

== Electoral history ==
2020 North Carolina Republican lieutenant gubernatorial primary election
Party	Candidate	Votes	%
Republican	Mark Robinson	240,843	32.52%
Republican	Andy Wells	107,824	14.56%
Republican	Mark Johnson	89,200	12.04%
Republican	John L. Ritter	85,023	11.48%
Republican	Renee Ellmers	50,526	6.82%
Republican	Greg Gebhardt	50,474	6.81%
Republican	Deborah Cochran	48,234	6.51%
Republican	Scott Stone	48,193	6.51%
Republican	Buddy Bengel	20,395	2.75%
Total votes		740,712	100%

2020 North Carolina lieutenant gubernatorial election
Party	Candidate	Votes	%
Republican	Mark Robinson	2,800,655	51.63%
Democratic	Yvonne Lewis Holley	2,623,458	48.37%
Total votes		5,424,113	100%
Republican hold			

2024 North Carolina Republican gubernatorial primary election
Party	Candidate	Votes	%
Republican	Mark Robinson	666,504	64.8%
Republican	Dale Folwell	196,955	19.2%
Republican	Bill Graham	164,572	16.0%
Total votes		1,028,031	100%

2024 North Carolina gubernatorial election
Party	Candidate	Votes	%
Democratic	Josh Stein	3,069,496	54.90%
Republican	Mark Robinson	2,241,309	40.08%
Libertarian	Mike Ross	176,392	3.15%
Constitution	Vinny Smith	54,738	0.98%
Green	Wayne Turner	49,612	0.89%
Total votes		5,591,547	100.0%
Democratic hold			

== See also ==
- List of minority governors and lieutenant governors in the United States
- List of lieutenant governors of North Carolina
- List of African-American Republicans

Party political offices
Preceded by Dan Forest	Republican nominee for Lieutenant Governor of North Carolina; 2020	Succeeded by Hal Weatherman
Preceded by Dan Forest	Republican nominee for Governor of North Carolina; 2024	Most recent
Political offices
Preceded by Dan Forest	Lieutenant Governor of North Carolina; 2021–2025	Succeeded by Rachel Hunt
