= Cushi =

Hebrew Bible term for dark-skinned African

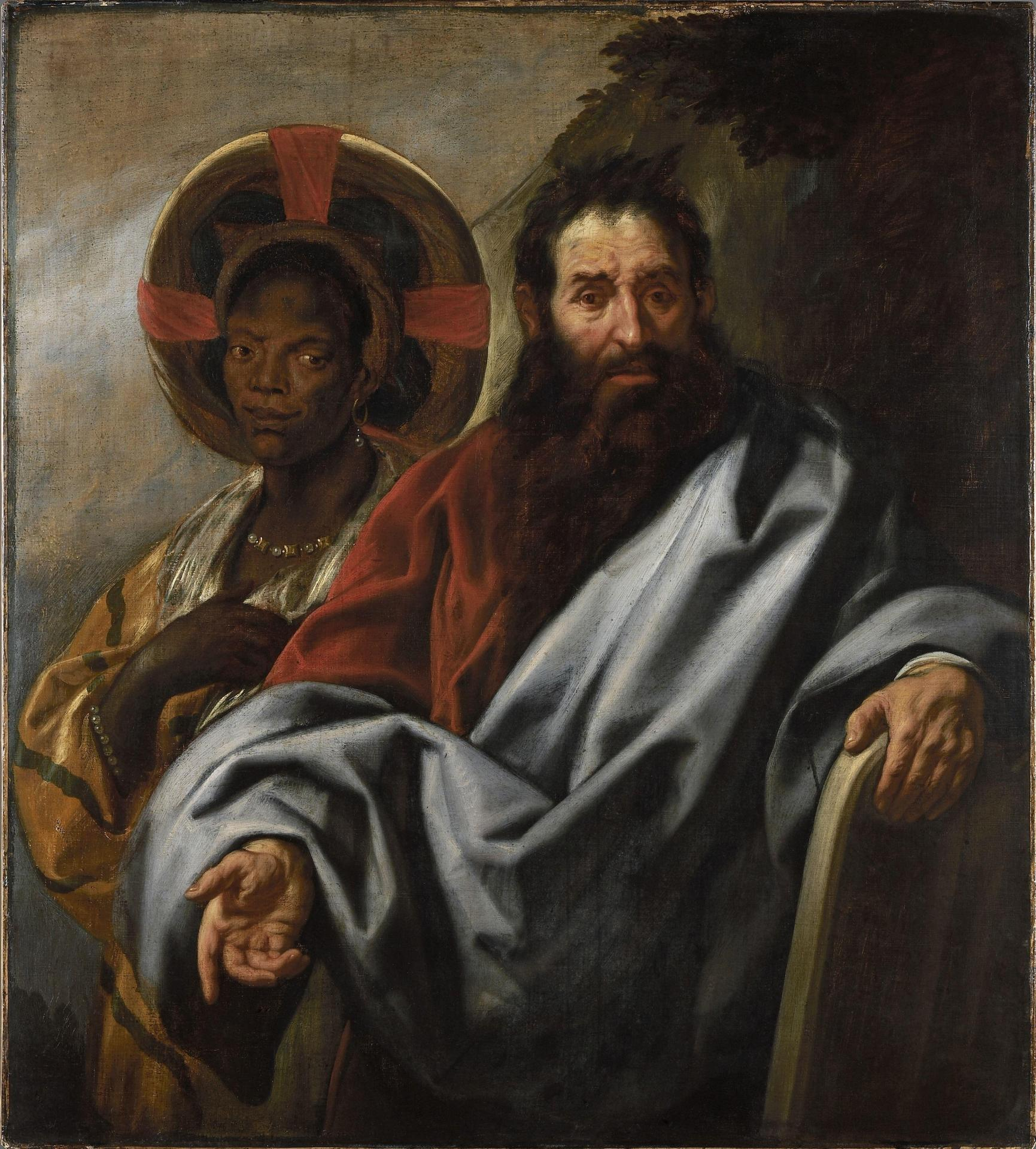
Moses and his Ethiopian wife Zipporah (Mozes en zijn Ethiopische vrouw Sippora). Jacob Jordaens, c. 1650

The word Cushi or Kushi (Hebrew: כּוּשִׁי Hebrew pronunciation: [kuˈʃi] colloquial: [ˈkuʃi]) is a term used in the Hebrew Bible to refer to a dark-skinned person of African descent, equivalent to Greek Αἰθίοψ "Aithíops". However, today the term is generally understood to be a racial slur for people of African descent.

== Etymology and biblical use ==
The word is a derivation of Cush (כּוּשׁ Kūš), referring to the ancient Kingdom of Kush which was centered on the Upper Nile and Nubia (modern-day Sudan). Mentioned in the Hebrew Bible, Cushites are considered descendants of Noah's grandson, Cush the son of Ham. In biblical and historical usage, the term "Cushites" (Hamites) refers to individuals of East African origin (Horn of Africa and Sudan).

== Modern use ==
In early Modern Hebrew usage, the term Cushi was used as an unmarked referent to a dark-skinned or red-haired person, without derogatory implications. For example, it is the nickname, or term of endearment, of the Israeli commando of Yemenite extraction, Shimon "Kushi" Rimon (b. 1939). When William Shakespeare's Othello was first translated to Hebrew in 1874 by Isaac Salkinsohn, the hero of the play was named Ithiel the Cushite (איתיאל הכושי).

=== Contemporary use ===
In contemporary usage, the term is regarded as a racial slur. Some believe intent can be determined in part based on emphasis. If the first syllable is emphasized [ˈku.ʃi], then the usage is more likely derogatory. If the second is emphasized [kuˈʃi], then it is less likely to be intentionally offensive. However, the use of the word cushi (or kushi) has generally become frowned upon, especially in academic spaces. Though it has been compared to the slur nigger in the United States, every usage of the word cushi was not initially considered to be derogatory by some people. When Ethiopian migrants to Israel began identifying the term as a slur in the 1990s, some made the conscious decision to discontinue its usage when referring to Israelis of Ethiopian descent. However, cushi continued to be used in reference to non-Ethiopian people of African descent.

In 2016, Hasidic singer Mordechai Ben David attracted controversy after a video taken at his December 28 concert in Jerusalem, wherein he referred to US President Barack Obama as a kushi, was circulated online.

== See also ==
- Cushite woman on Hebrew Wikipedia
- Cushitic languages
- Racism in Jewish communities
- Schvartze
- Zipporah, wife of Moses, depending on interpretation described as "Cushite" in the Bible
