= Darrell McCormick =

American politician from North Carolina

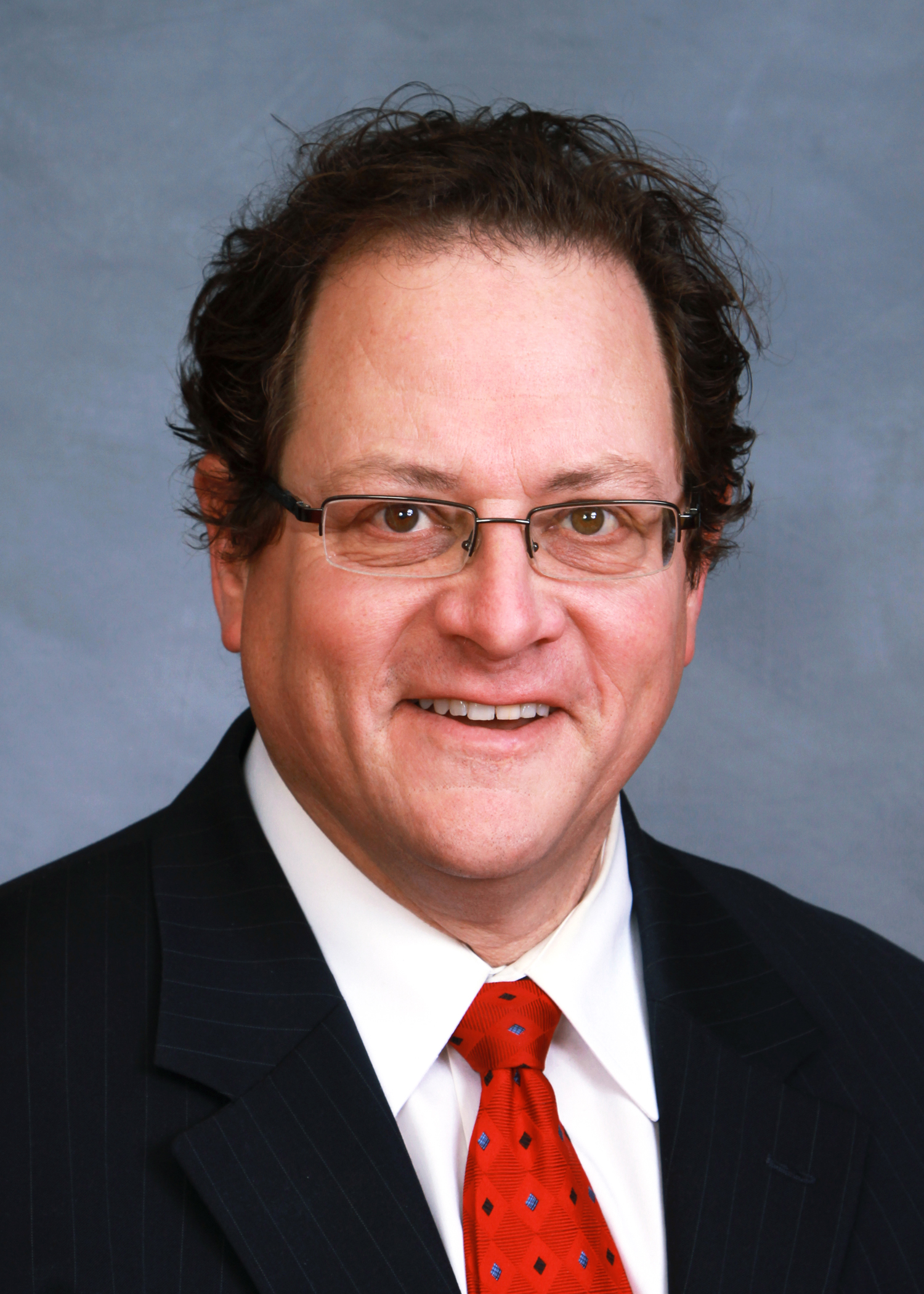

Member of the North Carolina House of Representatives from the 92nd district
- In office January 1, 2009 – January 1, 2013
- Preceded by: George Holmes
- Succeeded by: Mark Hollo (Redistricting)

Personal details
- Party: Republican
- Children: 2
- Education: Appalachian State University (BA)

Darrell McCormick is an American politician who served in the North Carolina House of Representatives from the 92nd district from 2009 to 2013.

== Committee Assignments ==
=== 2011–2012 session ===
- Agriculture
- Banking
- Commerce and Job Development
- Commerce and Job Development - Business and Labor (Chair)
- Environment
- Finance

=== 2009–2010 session ===
- Aging
- Agriculture
- Education
- Education - Community Colleges
- Energy and Energy Efficiency
- Finance
- University Board of Governors Nominating

== Electoral History ==
=== 2012 ===
North Carolina House of Representatives 73rd district Republican primary election, 2012
Party	Candidate	Votes	%
Republican	Mark Hollo (incumbent)	9,070	67.60%
Republican	Darrell McCormick (incumbent)	4,347	32.40%
Total votes		13,417	100%

=== 2010 ===
North Carolina House of Representatives 92nd district general election, 2010
Party	Candidate	Votes	%
Republican	Darrell McCormick (incumbent)	15,883	100%
Total votes		15,883	100%
Republican hold			

=== 2008 ===
North Carolina House of Representatives 92nd district Republican primary election, 2008
Party	Candidate	Votes	%
Republican	Darrell McCormick	4,693	70.79%
Republican	Dempsey B. Brewer	1,936	29.21%
Total votes		6,629	100%

North Carolina House of Representatives 92nd district general election, 2008
Party	Candidate	Votes	%
Republican	Darrell McCormick	18,219	63.16%
Democratic	Ric Marshall	10,626	36.84%
Total votes		28,845	100%
Republican hold			

North Carolina House of Representatives
Preceded by George Holmes	Member of the North Carolina House of Representatives from the 92nd district 2009–2013	Succeeded by Charles Jeter
