= Chaz Beasley =

American attorney and politician from North Carolina

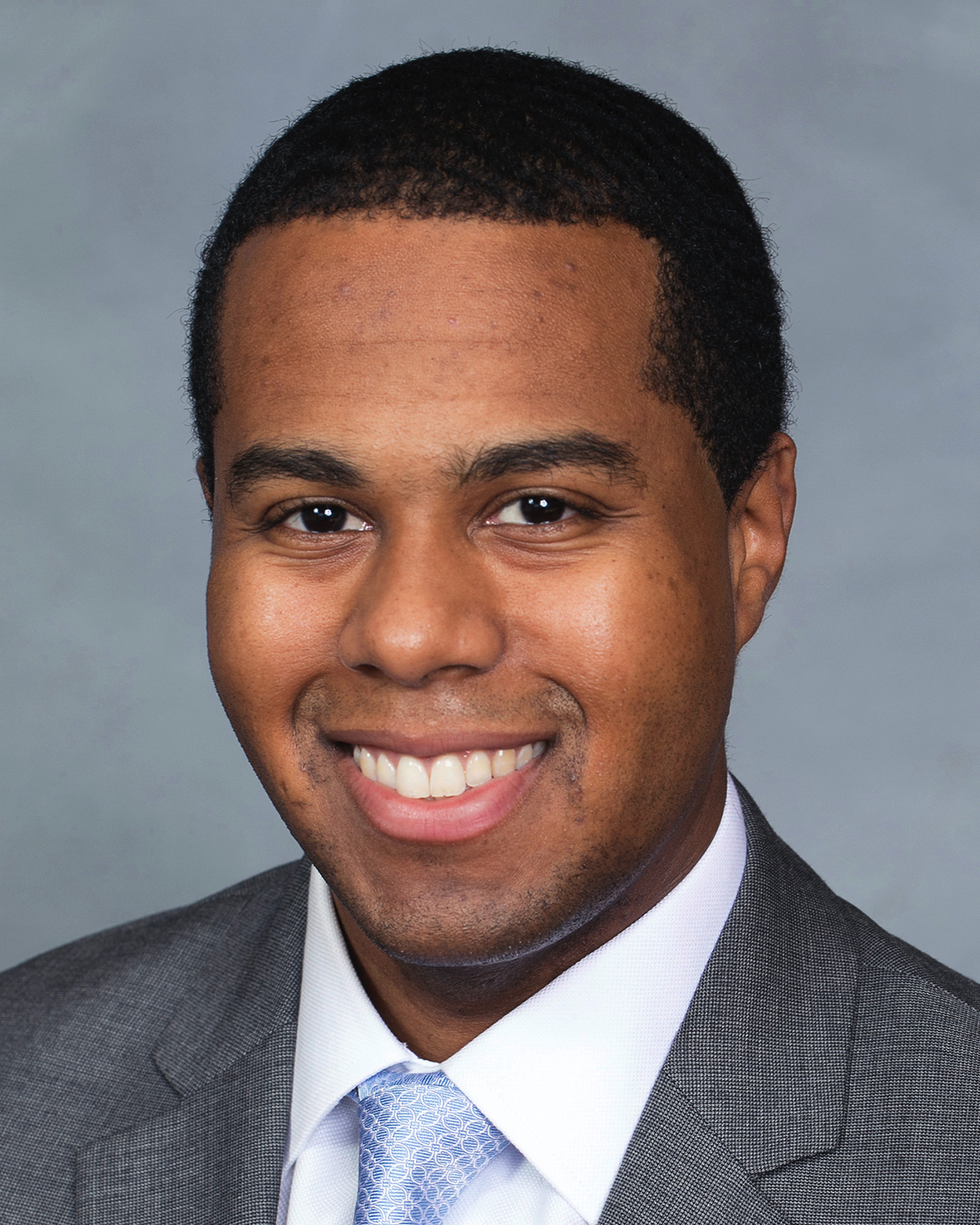

Member of the North Carolina House of Representatives from the 92nd district
- In office January 1, 2017 – January 1, 2021
- Preceded by: Justin Moore
- Succeeded by: Terry Brown

Personal details
- Born: October 24, 1985 (age 40) Statesville, North Carolina
- Party: Democratic
- Education: Harvard University (AB); Georgetown University (JD)
- Occupation: Attorney, politician

Chaz Beasley (born October 24, 1985) is an American attorney and politician in Charlotte, North Carolina. Beasley represented District 92 (part of Mecklenburg County) in the North Carolina House of Representatives and was elected to his first term on November 8, 2016.

== Early life ==
Chaz Beasley was born in Statesville, North Carolina, and grew up in a low-income, single parent home.

== Education ==
Beasley graduated as valedictorian of Newton-Conover High School in 2004, with high honors in economics from Harvard University in 2008, and from Georgetown Law School in 2013, during which time he also coached youth basketball at a small grade school.

== Career ==
Currently a Senior Counsel with the law firm of Proskauer Rose, Beasley works in finance, focusing on capital markets transactions, representing financial institutions in corporate and structured debt financing. Before that, Beasley served on the staff of the United States Senate Majority Leader and as an employee of the law firm Alston & Bird. He also interned for judges on the United States Court of Appeals for the Fourth Circuit and the Supreme Court of North Carolina. During the 2008 financial crisis, he performed risk management in the residential mortgage industry.

== Politics ==
Beasley has been elected twice (in 2016 and 2018) as a member of the North Carolina House of Representatives for District 92.

In 2019, he announced his candidacy for Lieutenant Governor of North Carolina in the 2020 election. Beasley tied for third place on March 3, 2020, with 18.86% of the vote.

In 2022, Governor Roy Cooper appointed Beasley to the State Board of Community Colleges.

== Personal life ==
Beasley lives in the Steele Creek area of Charlotte.

== Electoral history ==
=== 2020 ===
2020 North Carolina lieutenant gubernatorial election Democratic primary election, 2020
Party	Candidate	Votes	%
Democratic	Yvonne Lewis Holley	309,274	26.58%
Democratic	Terry Van Duyn	237,885	20.44%
Democratic	Chaz Beasley	219,503	18.86%
Democratic	Allen Thomas	219,229	18.84%
Democratic	Bill Toole	111,843	9.61%
Democratic	Ron Newton	65,970	5.67%
Total votes		1,163,704	100.00%

=== 2018 ===
North Carolina House of Representatives 92nd district general election, 2018
Party	Candidate	Votes	%
Democratic	Chaz Beasley (incumbent)	20,043	70.02%
Republican	Debbie Ware	8,580	29.98%
Total votes		28,623	100%
Democratic hold			

=== 2016 ===
North Carolina House of Representatives 92nd district general election, 2016
Party	Candidate	Votes	%
Democratic	Chaz Beasley	22,941	54.38%
Republican	Beth Danae Caulfield	19,246	45.62%
Total votes		42,187	100%
Democratic gain from Republican			

North Carolina House of Representatives
Preceded by Justin Moore	Member of the North Carolina House of Representatives from the 92nd district 2017–2021	Succeeded by Terry Brown
