= Team Racing Auto Circuit =

Defunct US stock car racing organization

- Category: Stock cars
- Jurisdiction: United States
- Abbreviation: TRAC
- Founded: 2001
- Closure date: 2004

Official website
- www.traczone.com
- (United States)

Team Racing Auto Circuit (TRAC) was a proposed American stock car racing organization founded by Hank Durschlag and Charles Jeter that was scheduled to begin operations in 2004. TRAC was proposed by a group called Team Sports and Entertainment Inc., whose shareholders included Cale Yarborough, a three-time winner of the NASCAR Winston Cup Series season title, television executive Robert Wussler; and former college football coach Danny Ford. Among the series' board members includes former Cup team owner Michael Kranefuss.

Bill Miller was named chief executive officer of Team Sports Entertainment Inc. and its subsidiary, the Charlotte-based Team Racing Auto Circuit. Miller is the chairman of Miller Industries Inc., a provider of vehicle towing and recovery equipment and services.

== Premise ==
The concept of TRAC was to put teams of drivers, particularly 8–12 two-driver teams, in identically prepared cars that were said to be similar to the muscle cars produced by Detroit. Some of the cars that were scheduled to compete included the Chevrolet Corvette, the Dodge Viper, and the Ford Mustang. All entries were to be equipped with Riley & Scott-designed chassis and fuel-injected V8 engines supplied and sealed (to prevent tampering) by a designated vendor. The race tracks planned were primarily ovals with capacities of at least 50,000 people.

Teams, representing various tracks throughout the country, would accumulate points in each race for each driver, presumably based on the order of finish. The plan called for regular season races, playoffs, and a championship.

TRAC had a contract from ESPN to televise the races. Raycom Media handled marketing and sold advertising, and Yarborough was the league's spokesman.

The series held a test at Atlanta Motor Speedway in April 2002 with Andy Hillenburg and Tony Ave driving the cars. Four months later, at Lowe's Motor Speedway, Ave and Boris Said tested the cars.

== Fall ==
TRAC was unable to sell sponsorships for any of the proposed teams, prompting the series' debut to be postponed to 2004, but the league ultimately folded without conducting a single race. The end of TRAC was officially announced on August 26, 2003.

In 2004, Team Sports and Entertainment was sued by four shareholders for "breach of contract, wrongful conversion of company monies, mismanagement, breach of fiduciary duty and fraud."
