= Abe Jones (politician) =

American politician

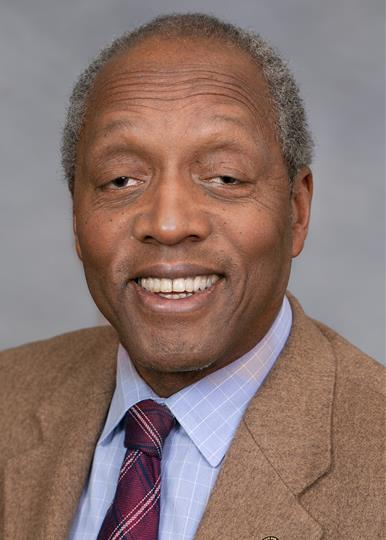

Member of the North Carolina House of Representatives from the 38th district
- Incumbent
- Assumed office January 1, 2021
- Preceded by: Yvonne Lewis Holley

Personal details
- Born: Abraham Penn Jones; March 7, 1952 (age 74) Wilson, North Carolina, U.S.
- Party: Democratic
- Children: 2
- Education: Harvard University (AB, JD)
- Occupation: Attorney
- Website: Official website

Abraham Penn Jones (born March 7, 1952) is a Democratic member of the North Carolina House of Representatives who has represented the 38th district (including parts of Wake County) since 2021.

Jones was born in Wilson, North Carolina. He graduated from Harvard University in 1974 and went on to Harvard Law School where he earned his J.D in 1977. After returning to North Carolina, he worked for the office of the U.S. Attorney for the Eastern District of North Carolina and the office of the North Carolina Attorney General.

Jones served on the Wake County Board of Commissioners from 1990 to 1994. Jones was an administrative law judge before his appointment to District 10 of the North Carolina Superior Court by Governor Jim Hunt in 1995. He was elected to the position in 1996 and narrowly won reelection in 2004 over future NC Supreme Court Justice Michael R. Morgan. He served in that role until losing reelection in 2012 to Bryan Collins. He ran unsuccessfully in 2014 and 2016 for election to the Court of Appeals.

Jones has taught classes at the University of North Carolina School of Law. He is a member of Alpha Phi Alpha fraternity, and Martin Street Baptist Church.

== Committee assignments ==
=== 2021-2022 session ===
- Appropriations
- Appropriations - Justice and Public Safety
- Judiciary 1
- Regulatory Reform
- UNC BOG Nominations
- Wildlife Resources

== Electoral history ==
=== 2026 ===
North Carolina House of Representatives 38th district Democratic primary election, 2026
Party	Candidate	Votes	%
Democratic	Abe Jones (incumbent)	7,391	69.65%
Democratic	Collin Fearns	3,220	30.35%
Total votes		10,611	100%

North Carolina House of Representatives 38th district general election, 2026
Party	Candidate	Votes	%
Democratic	Abe Jones (incumbent)		100%
Total votes			100%
Democratic hold			

=== 2024 ===
North Carolina House of Representatives 38th district general election
Party	Candidate	Votes	%
Democratic	Abe Jones	32,852	100.00%
Total votes		32,852	100%
Democratic hold			

=== 2022 ===
North Carolina House of Representatives 38th district general election
Party	Candidate	Votes	%
Democratic	Abe Jones	24,036	87.45%
Libertarian	Christopher Mizelle	3,450	12.55%
Total votes		27,486	100%
Democratic hold			

=== 2020 ===
North Carolina House of Representatives 38th district democratic primary election
Party	Candidate	Votes	%
Democratic	Abe Jones	8,718	57.24%
Democratic	Quanta Monique Edwards	6,512	42.76%
Total votes		15,230	100%

North Carolina House of Representatives 38th district general election
Party	Candidate	Votes	%
Democratic	Abe Jones	33,058	77.71%
Republican	Kenneth Bagnal	7,535	17.71%
Libertarian	Richard Haygood	1,949	4.58%
Total votes		42,542	100%
Democratic hold			

=== 2016 ===
North Carolina Court of Appeals Judge
Party	Candidate	Votes	%
Republican	Bob Hunter	2,403,059	54.37%
Democratic	Abe Jones	2,016,552	45.63%
Total votes		4,419,611	100%

=== 2014 ===
North Carolina Court of Appeals Judge
Party	Candidate	Votes	%
	John M. Tyson	557,700	23.84%
	John S. Arrowood	336,839	14.40%
	Keischa Lovelace	226,159	9.67%
	Marion Warren	143,279	6.13%
	Elizabeth Davenport Scott	131,330	5.61%
	Marty Martin	120,281	5.14%
	Hunter Murphy	103,361	4.42%
	Ann Kirby	96,468	4.12%
	Valerie Johnson Zachary	92,361	3.95%
	Lori G. Christian	88,819	3.80%
	Tricia Shields	79,357	3.39%
	Daniel Patrick Donahue	66,168	2.83%
	Abe Jones	59,712	2.55%
	Chuck Winfree	52,978	2.26%
	Jeffrey M. Cook	48,336	2.07%
	Jody Newsome	38,544	1.65%
	Betsy Bunting	36,163	1.55%
	Sabra Jean Faires	31,759	1.36%
	J. Brad Donovan	29,580	1.26%
Total votes		2,339,194	100%

=== 2012 ===
North Carolina Superior Court Judge District 10E
Party	Candidate	Votes	%
	Bryan Collins	27,845	51.91%
	Abe Jones	25,801	48.09%
Total votes		53,646	100%

=== 2004 ===
North Carolina Superior Court Judge District 10A
Party	Candidate	Votes	%
	Abe Jones	14,532	50.55%
	Michael R. (Mike) Morgan	14,217	49.45%
Total votes		28,749	100%

=== 1994 ===
Wake County Commissioner - District 3
Party	Candidate	Votes	%
Democratic	Abe Jones	47,840	43.48%
Republican	Leo Tew	62,164	56.5%
Total votes		110,004	100%

=== 1990 ===
Wake County Commissioner - District 3
Party	Candidate	Votes	%
Democratic	Abe Jones	65,895	55.1%
Republican	David V. Brooks	54,683	45.03%
Total votes		120,578	100%

Democratic Primary Wake County Commissioner - District 3
Party	Candidate	Votes	%
Democratic	Abe Jones	14,090	49.4%
Democratic	Judy Benda	7,723	27%
Democratic	Billy R. Johnson	6,692	32%
Total votes		28,505	100%

=== 1988 ===
Democratic Primary Wake County Commissioner - District 6
Party	Candidate	Votes	%
Democratic	James A. Perry	8,799	34.6%
Democratic	Betty Lou Ward	8,465	33.4
Democratic	Abe Jones	8,103	32%
Total votes		25,367	100%

North Carolina House of Representatives
Preceded by Yvonne Lewis Holley	Member of the North Carolina House of Representatives from the 38th district 2021–Present	Incumbent
