= 2020 North Carolina lieutenant gubernatorial election =

- November 3, 2020
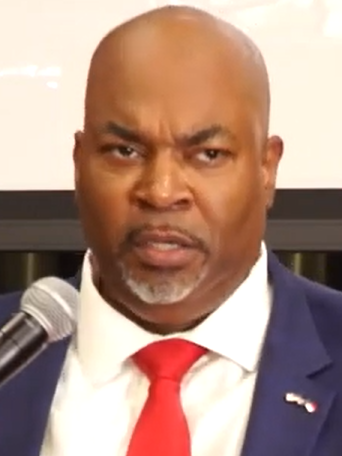

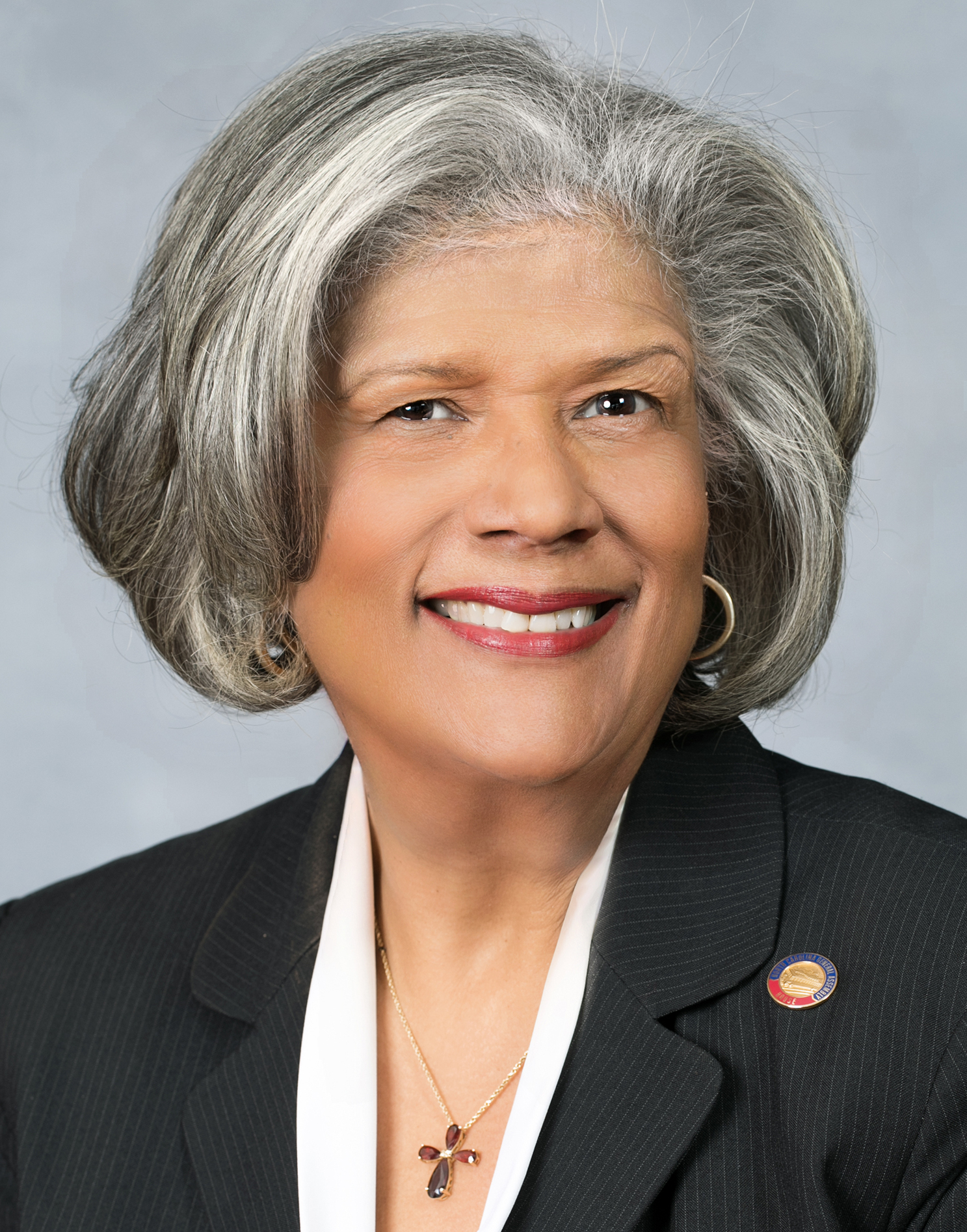
Nominee	Mark Robinson	Yvonne Lewis Holley
Party	Republican	Democratic
Popular vote	2,800,656	2,623,458
Percentage	51.63%	48.37%
- Robinson: 50–60% 60–70% 70–80% 80–90% >90% Holley: 50–60% 60–70% 70–80% 80–90% >90% Tie: 50%
Lieutenant Governor before election
Dan Forest
Republican
Elected Lieutenant Governor
Mark Robinson
Republican

The 2020 North Carolina lieutenant gubernatorial election took place on November 3, 2020, to elect the Lieutenant Governor of North Carolina, concurrently with the 2020 U.S. presidential election, as well as elections to the United States Senate and elections to the United States House of Representatives and various state and local elections. Primary elections were held on March 3, 2020.

In North Carolina, the Governor and Lieutenant Governor are elected separately.

Incumbent Republican Lieutenant Governor Dan Forest was re-elected to a second term in 2016, despite Republican Governor Pat McCrory losing reelection by a narrow margin. Forest was ineligible to run for a third term due to term limits established by the Constitution of North Carolina. He instead unsuccessfully ran for Governor.

The Republican Party nominated businessman Mark Robinson (a first time public office candidate), and the Democratic Party nominated state representative Yvonne Lewis Holley. Notwithstanding the winner, North Carolina would elect its first African-American lieutenant governor. Robinson won the general election, while Democratic incumbent Gov. Roy Cooper won re-election.

== Republican primary ==
=== Candidates ===
==== Nominee ====
- Mark Robinson, businessman

==== Eliminated in primary ====
- Buddy Bengel, North Carolina Education Lottery commissioner
- Deborah Cochran, former mayor of Mount Airy
- Renee Ellmers, former U.S. Representative for North Carolina's 2nd congressional district
- Greg Gebhardt, North Carolina National Guardsman and U.S. Army veteran
- Mark Johnson, North Carolina Superintendent of Public Instruction
- John L. Ritter, attorney
- Scott Stone, former state representative
- Andy Wells, state senator

==== Declined ====
- Mark Brody, state representative
- Jim Puckett, Mecklenburg County commissioner
- Mark Walker, incumbent U.S. Representative for North Carolina's 6th congressional district

=== Polling ===
Poll source	Date(s) administered	Sample size (Note: Key: A – all adults RV – registered voters LV – likely voters V – unclear)	Margin of error	Buddy Bengel	Deborah Cochran	Renee Ellmers	Greg Gebhardt	Mark Johnson	John Ritter	Mark Robinson	Scott Stone	Andy Wells	Undecided
Harper Polling/Civitas Institute	December 2–4, 2019	500 (LV)	± 4.38%	5%	8%	7%	3%	3%	1%	4%	1%	1%	67%

=== Results ===
Primary results by county: Robinson: Robinson—61-70%; Robinson—51-60%; Robinson—41-50%; Robinson—31-40%; Robinson—21-30%; Wells: Wells—41-50%; Ritter: Ritter—31-40%; Ellmers: Ellmers—21-30%; Cochran: Cochran—41-50%; Stone: Stone—11-20%

Republican primary results
Party	Candidate	Votes	%
Republican	Mark Robinson	240,843	32.52%
Republican	Andy Wells	107,824	14.56%
Republican	Mark Johnson	89,200	12.04%
Republican	John L. Ritter	85,023	11.48%
Republican	Renee Ellmers	50,526	6.82%
Republican	Greg Gebhardt	50,474	6.81%
Republican	Deborah Cochran	48,234	6.51%
Republican	Scott Stone	48,193	6.51%
Republican	Buddy Bengel	20,395	2.75%
Total votes		740,712	100.00%

== Democratic primary ==
=== Candidates ===
==== Nominee ====
- Yvonne Lewis Holley, state representative

==== Eliminated in primary ====
- Chaz Beasley, state representative
- Ron Newton, candidate for lieutenant governor in 2016
- Allen Thomas, Hoke County commissioner
- Bill Toole, environmental attorney, former Belmont city councilman, and former chairman of the Gaston County Democratic Party
- Terry Van Duyn, state senator

==== Withdrawn ====
- Cal Cunningham, former state senator (ran for the U.S. Senate)

=== Polling ===
Poll source	Date(s) administered	Sample size	Margin of error	Chaz Beasley	Yvonne Holley	Ron Newton	Allen Thomas	Bill Toole	Terry Van Duyn	Undecided
Public Policy Polling	February 4–5, 2020	604	-	6%	7%	1%	4%	2%	5%	75%
Public Policy Polling	January 10–13, 2020	509	-	3%	7%	2%	6%	2%	4%	77%

=== Results ===
Primary results by county: Lewis Holley: Lewis Holley—41-50%; Lewis Holley—31-40%; Lewis Holley—21-30%; Van Duyn: Van Duyn—61-70%; Van Duyn—41-50%; Van Duyn—31-40%; Van Duyn—21-30%; Beasley: Beasley—51-60%; Beasley—41-50%; Beasley—31-40%; Beasley—21-30%; Thomas: Thomas—71-80%; Thomas—61-70%; Thomas—51-60%; Thomas—41-50%; Thomas—31-40%; Toole: Toole—31-40%; Newton: Newton—51-60%

Democratic primary results
Party	Candidate	Votes	%
Democratic	Yvonne Lewis Holley	309,274	26.58%
Democratic	Terry Van Duyn	237,885	20.44%
Democratic	Chaz Beasley	219,503	18.86%
Democratic	Allen Thomas	219,229	18.84%
Democratic	Bill Toole	111,843	9.61%
Democratic	Ron Newton	65,970	5.67%
Total votes		1,163,704	100.00%

Because no candidate in the Democratic primary won more than 30 percent of the vote, second-place finisher Terry Van Duyn was entitled to call for a runoff, or "second primary," if she chose to do so. However, Van Duyn chose not to call for a runoff, and Yvonne Holley was awarded the Democratic nomination.

== General election ==
=== Campaign ===
==== Robinson controversy ====
The Republican nominee attracted controversy in September as a result of his social media posts alleging negative Jewish influence in Hollywood, among other complaints. He claimed that the movie Black Panther was "created by an agnostic Jew and put to film by satanic marxist [sic]. How can this trash, that was only created to pull the shekels out of your Schvartze pockets, invoke any pride?" He also mischaracterized former first lady Michelle Obama as male and her husband Barack Obama as an atheist. Robinson stood by his comments in a September interview with Raleigh news station WRAL, stating, "I don’t back up from them a bit. May hurt some people’s feelings, some things that people may not like, but those are my personal opinions."

=== Endorsements ===
Yvonne Lewis Holley (D)

Newspapers

- The Charlotte Observer
- Indy Week

=== Polling ===
View source data.

Poll source	Date(s) administered	Sample size	Margin of error	Mark Robinson (R)	Yvonne Lewis Holley (D)	Other	Undecided
East Carolina University	October 27–28, 2020	1,103 (LV)	± 3.4%	47%	43%	2% (Note: Did/would not vote with 2%)	8%
Cardinal Point Analytics (R)	October 27–28, 2020	750 (LV)	± 3.6%	45%	44%	–	12%
Meeting Street Insights (R)	October 24–27, 2020	600 (LV)	± 4%	46%	47%	–	–
SurveyUSA	October 23–26, 2020	627 (LV)	± 4.9%	47%	44%	–	9%
Harper Polling/Civitas (R)	October 22–25, 2020	504 (LV)	± 4.4%	43%	46%	–	10%
East Carolina University	October 15–18, 2020	1,155 (LV)	± 3.4%	47%	42%	1% (Note: Would/did not vote with 1%)	9%
East Carolina University	October 2–4, 2020	1,232 (LV)	± 3.2%	45%	45%	2% (Note: Would not vote with 2%)	9%
Harper Polling/Civitas (R)	September 17–20, 2020	612 (LV)	± 3.96%	43%	40%	–	16%
SurveyUSA	September 10–13, 2020	596 (LV)	± 5.6%	41%	41%	–	18%
East Carolina University	August 29–30, 2020	1,101 (LV)	± 3.4%	43%	40%	3% (Note: "Some other candidate" with 3%; would not vote with 1%)	14%
Cardinal Point Analytics (R)	July 22–24, 2020	735 (LV)	± 3.6%	46%	38%	–	16%
Cardinal Point Analytics (R)	July 13–15, 2020	547 (LV)	± 4.2%	43%	39%	–	18%

=== Results ===
North Carolina lieutenant gubernatorial election, 2020
Party	Candidate	Votes	%	±%
Republican	Mark Robinson	2,800,656	51.63%	−0.18%
Democratic	Yvonne Lewis Holley	2,623,458	48.37%	+3.05%
Total votes		5,424,114	100.0%	
Republican hold				

==== By congressional district ====
Robinson won eight of 13 congressional districts.

District	Robinson	Lewis Holley	Representative
1st	46%	54%	G. K. Butterfield
2nd	37%	63%	George Holding
2nd	37%	63%	Deborah K. Ross
3rd	62%	38%	Greg Murphy
4th	34%	66%	David Price
5th	68%	32%	Virginia Foxx
6th	39%	61%	Mark Walker
6th	39%	61%	Kathy Manning
7th	59%	41%	David Rouzer
8th	54%	46%	Richard Hudson
9th	55%	45%	Dan Bishop
10th	69%	31%	Patrick McHenry
11th	57%	43%	Madison Cawthorn
12th	31%	69%	Alma Adams
13th	68%	32%	Ted Budd
