= Schvartze =

Racial slur in the Yiddish language

Schvartze (from שוואַרץ, shvarts, "black"; cf. German: schwarz) is a racial slur for black people.

== Etymology ==
Schvartze is derived from the Yiddish word שוואַרץ, shvarts, which means "black", cognate to the German schwarz. The term was rare prior to the middle of the twentieth century. An article for the Washington Jewish Week refers to it as "the S-word".

Black Jewish writer Michael W. Twitty noted in 2017 a handful of public instances in which the term was used. He notes that he had never heard the term used in earlier stages of his life and spoke against a return of the word's use, comparing it to the term "kushi".

== Responses ==
In 1991, the stand-up comedian Jackie Mason was criticized by African-American organizations including the NAACP, when he called New York City mayor David Dinkins "a fancy shvartze with a moustache"; Mason later apologized. In 2009, Mason referred to Barack Obama as a shvartze during one of his stand-up routines, which prompted members of the audience to walk out.

In 2021, the Republican Jewish Coalition and other Jewish groups in North Carolina urged Lieutenant Governor Mark Robinson to apologize for antisemitic comments, including a Facebook post that said the film Black Panther was created by an "agnostic Jew" and a "satanic Marxist" in order to extract "shekels out of your Schvartze pockets." Robinson refused to apologize.

== See also ==
- African American–Jewish relations
- Cushi
- Jews of color
- Racism in Jewish communities
- Nigger
