= Terry M. Brown Jr. =

American politician

Terry Brown
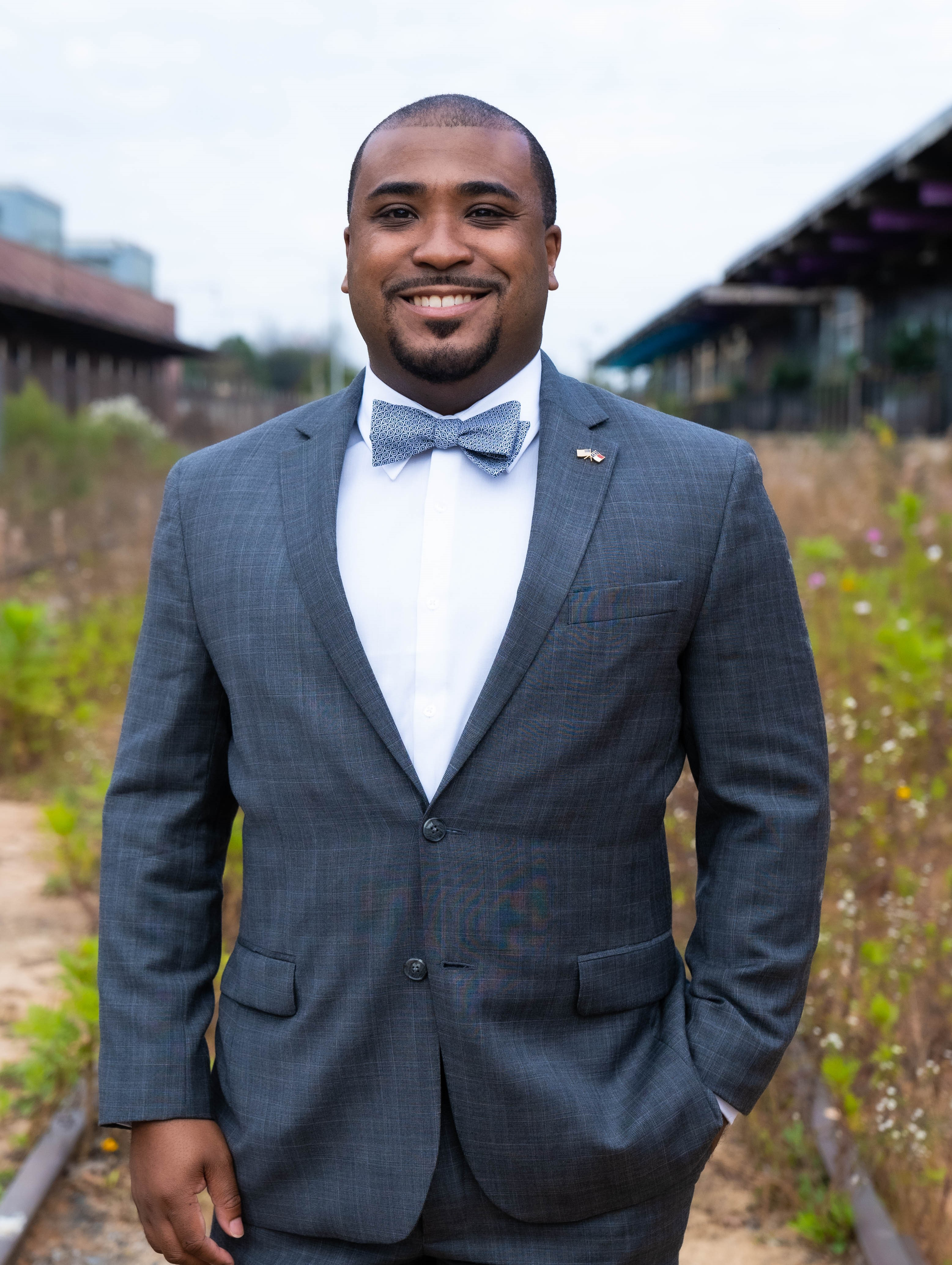

Member of the North Carolina House of Representatives from the 92nd district
- Incumbent
- Assumed office January 1, 2021
- Preceded by: Chaz Beasley

Personal details
- Born: June 8, 1987 (age 39) Fayetteville, North Carolina, U.S.
- Party: Democratic
- Spouse: Arielle
- Education: University of North Carolina, Charlotte (BA); Campbell University (JD)

Terry M. Brown Jr., (born June 8, 1987) is an American attorney and politician in Charlotte, North Carolina. Brown represents District 92 in the North Carolina House of Representatives.

== Early life and education ==
Brown was born and raised in Fayetteville, North Carolina, to two public school educators. After graduation from E.E. Smith High School in 2005, Brown attended the University of North Carolina at Charlotte, where he earned a Bachelor of Arts in Political Science. While at UNC Charlotte, Brown served as Freshman Class President, and Student Body Secretary of Student Affairs.

Brown obtained his Juris Doctor from Campbell University Norman Adrian Wiggins School of Law where he was runner up in the National Tournament of Champions and earned a Mock Trial National Championship. While at Campbell, Brown also served as the President of the Black Law Students Association and received the David R. Teddy Award for Leadership.

Following law school, Brown returned to Charlotte to practice law. Brown has also served as Vice-Chair of the City of Charlotte Zoning Board of Adjustment and Chair of the John S. Leary Association of Black Attorneys.

Brown has been named an Axios Charlotte 30 Under 30 Recipient, a Charlotte Mecklenburg Black Chamber of Commerce 30 under 30 recipient, a Charlotte Business Journal 40 under Forty recipient, and a Who’s Who of Black Charlotte. In 2017 Brown was named the UNC Charlotte Young Alumnus of the Year.

Brown currently works as a litigator at Buchanan, Ingersoll & Rooney’s Charlotte office.

== Politics ==
In January 2019 Brown announced his candidacy for a seat on the Charlotte City Council. Brown lost the primary for Charlotte City Council District 3 on September 10, 2019, 43.82% to 40.96%.

Brown ran for North Carolina House District 92 in 2020. House District 92 represents Southwest Mecklenburg County, including Historic Camp Greene, the West Boulevard Corridor, & Steele Creek. Brown was unopposed in the Democratic Primary. In the 2020 General Election on November 3, Brown faced Republican Jerry Munden. Brown defeated Munden by a margin of 72.91% to 27.09%.

2021-2022 session

In January 2021, Brown was elected co-chair of the House Democratic Freshman class. For the 2021–2022 legislative session, Brown was appointed to the following committees: Appropriations, Appropriations-Agriculture, Natural & Economic Resources, Energy & Public Utilities, Judiciary 3, and Regulatory Reform.

Leadership

Brown served as Chief Democratic Whip in 2025-2026. Following the 2026 election, Democrats in the House elected Brown as their incoming Majority Leader.

== Personal life ==
Brown lives in the Steele Creek area of Charlotte with his wife, Arielle. Brown is an active member of Alpha Phi Alpha fraternity.
