= Terry Van Duyn =

American politician

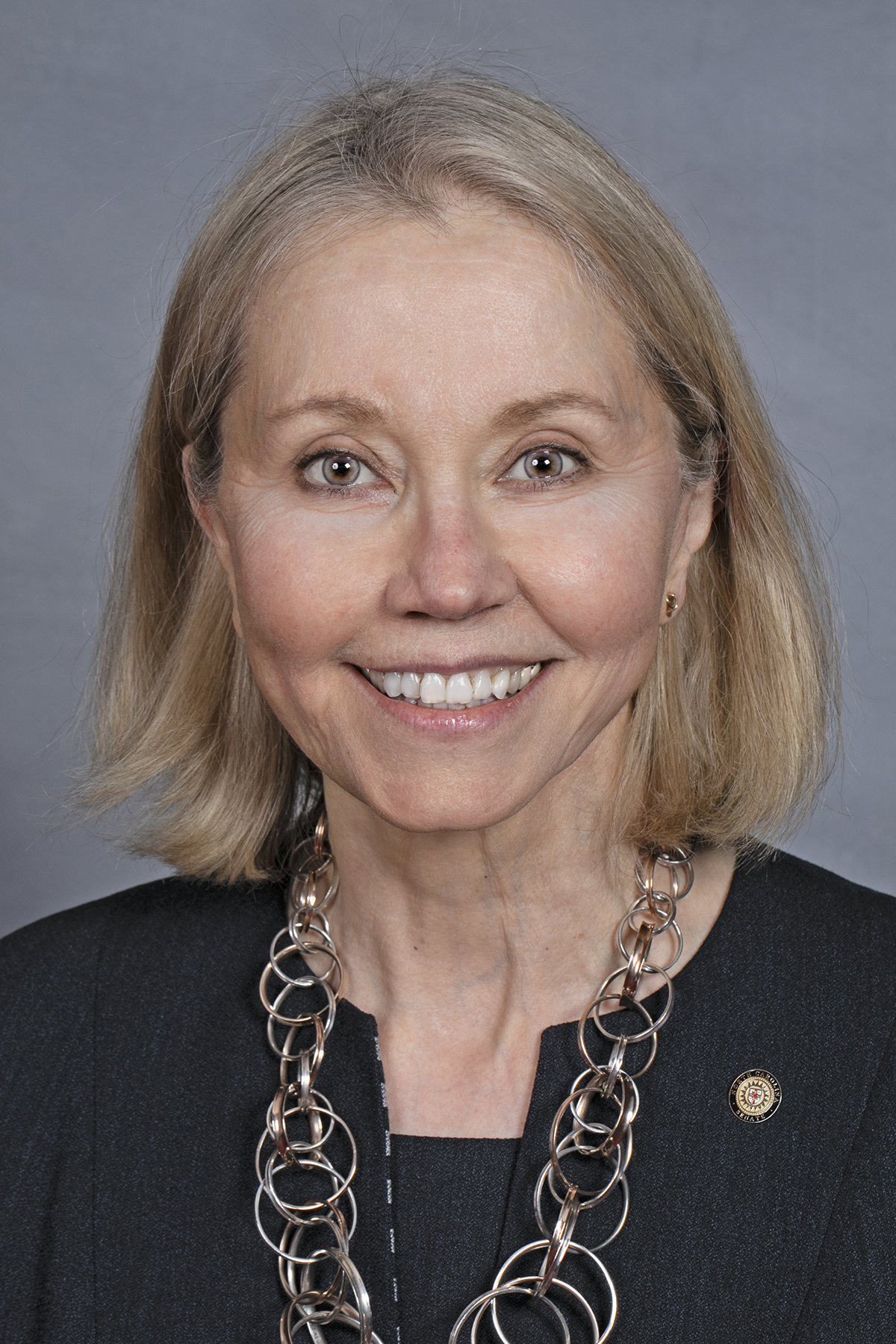

Member of the North Carolina Senate from the 49th district
- In office April 15, 2014 – January 1, 2021
- Preceded by: Martin Nesbitt
- Succeeded by: Julie Mayfield

Personal details
- Born: September 21, 1951 (age 75)
- Party: Democratic
- Spouse: Ted Van Duyn
- Children: 2
- Education: University of Illinois, Urbana-Champaign (BA); University of Connecticut (MBA)
- Website: Campaign website

Teresa Van Duyn (born September 21, 1951) is a former Democratic member of the North Carolina Senate. She represented District 49, which encompasses most of Asheville and Buncombe County, North Carolina from 2014 until 2021.

== Early life and education ==
Van Duyn grew up in the Chicago area and attended University of Illinois, where she earned a bachelor's degree in economics. She was the first in her family to earn a college degree. She then earned a Master's of Business Administration from University of Connecticut. Van Duyn is married to Ted Van Duyn, the CEO of GPM Corp. Together they have two children.

== Business career ==
Van Duyn subsequently transitioned into corporate leadership. Through positions at various software companies and startups, she managed regional operations and facilitated partnerships with several multinational corporations.

== Political career ==
After moving to Buncombe County in 1992 and retiring from computer systems analytics, Van Duyn became an active volunteer in several local non-profits and the local Democratic Party. She was appointed to the state Senate in April 2014 to fill the vacancy caused by the death of Sen. Martin L. Nesbitt. She won election to a full term in her own right the following November. After the election, she was elected Minority Whip by her colleagues for the 2015-2016 session.

Van Duyn has been awarded numerous honors during her time as a legislator. The Arc of North Carolina named her an Outstanding Legislator, in 2019. During her Freshman year, Van Duyn was awarded the Green-Tie by the North Carolina League of Conservation Voters and named a Rising Star for her 100% record on the environment. And in 2016, Van Duyn was named Legislator of the Year by Equality NC.

Over her time in office, Van Duyn has been a strong advocate for Medicaid Expansion. During a 2019 budget debate, Van Duyn had her microphone turned off by President Pro-Tempore, Senator Phil Berger (R), while running an amendment to include Medicaid Expansion into the state budget. Van Duyn has been vocally pro-choice during her time in office, and has opposed waiting periods for women seeking abortions. In a 2018 interview, Van Duyn was quoted saying 'To suggest to a woman who has made that difficult decision, that she needs to go home and think about it for another three days, especially when you have women for whom that's an economic hardship as well, that's just, it's an abuse of power.'

In December 2018, Van Duyn announced that she plans to run for Lieutenant Governor in 2020, stepping down from her role as Minority Whip to focus on the campaign.

As the former Democratic Whip, Van Duyn is the only candidate to have filed for the office who has served in the state Senate, the body in which the lieutenant governor serves as president, and to have leadership experience in the Democratic Caucus.

Van Duyn enters the race having raised more money than any other candidate for lieutenant governor and having more cash on hand than all announced Democratic Primary candidates combined, as of the latest finance disclosures.

During the 2018 election cycles, Van Duyn partnered with Cooper to win the six seats needed to break the Republican supermajority and was the lead fundraiser for the Senate Democratic Caucus.

== See also ==
- Buncombe Democratic Party

North Carolina Senate
Preceded by Martin Nesbitt	Member of the North Carolina Senate from the 49th district 2014-2021	Succeeded by Julie Mayfield
