= Emery B. Denny =

American judge (1892–1973)

17th Chief Justice of the North Carolina Supreme Court
- In office 1962–1966
- Preceded by: J. Wallace Winborne
- Succeeded by: R. Hunt Parker

Associate Justice of the North Carolina Supreme Court
- In office 1942–1962
- Preceded by: Heriot Clarkson
- Succeeded by: Susie Sharp

Chair of the North Carolina Democratic Party
- In office 1940–1942
- Preceded by: R. Gregg Cherry
- Succeeded by: Monroe M. Redden

28th Mayor of Gastonia
- In office 1929–1937
- Preceded by: Wiley T. Rankin
- Succeeded by: George B. Mason

Personal details
- Born: Emery Byrd Denny; November 23, 1892; Surry County, North Carolina, U.S.
- Died: April 24, 1973 (aged 80); Raleigh, North Carolina, U.S.
- Resting place: Historic Oakwood Cemetery
- Political party: Democratic

Emery Byrd Denny (November 23, 1892 – April 24, 1973) was an American jurist who served as an associate justice of the North Carolina Supreme Court from 1942 until 1962 and as chief justice of that court from 1962 until 1966.

Prior to his service on the court, he served as mayor of Gastonia from 1929 to 1937. In 1940, Denny managed the successful gubernatorial campaign of J. Melville Broughton and then served as chairman of the North Carolina Democratic Party.

He authored the dismissal of a case brought by students in Old Fort, North Carolina denying them admission to the local all-white school and instructing them to travel 12 miles away to Hudgins High School, a school for blacks, in Marion, North Carolina.

In 1967, the retired chief justice chaired a state constitutional study commission, the work of which eventually led to the new Constitution of North Carolina of 1971.

Denny was a longtime supporter of Southeastern Baptist Theological Seminary, where a building was named in his honor. There is also a Denny Building at the University of North Carolina, Charlotte.

Legal offices
Preceded by J. Wallace Winborne	Chief Justice of North Carolina Supreme Court; 1962 – 1966	Succeeded by R. Hunt Parker
