= Winborne =

Winborne is a surname. Notable people with the surname include:

- Hughes Winborne (born 1953), American film editor
- Jamaine Winborne (born 1980), American football player
- J. Wallace Winborne (1884–1966), American jurist
