= William H. Bobbitt =

American judge

William Haywood Bobbitt (October 18, 1900 – September 27, 1992), was an American jurist and chief justice of the North Carolina Supreme Court. Bobbitt was born in 1900 in Raleigh, North Carolina and earned his law degree at the University of North Carolina at Chapel Hill.

Bobbitt was elected a Superior Court judge and served with distinction from 1939 to 1954. In 1952, he was unsuccessful in a run for Supreme Court Associate Justice (losing to R. Hunt Parker), but in 1954, Governor William B. Umstead appointed him to replace associate justice M. V. Barnhill, who had just become chief justice. In 1969, Governor Robert W. Scott appointed Bobbitt to the top job following the death of Chief Justice R. Hunt Parker. Mandatory retirement age forced Bobbitt to step aside in 1974. He died in Raleigh.

Legal offices
Preceded by R. Hunt Parker	Chief Justice of the North Carolina Supreme Court; 1969 - 1974	Succeeded by Susie Sharp
