= R. Gregg Cherry =

American politician

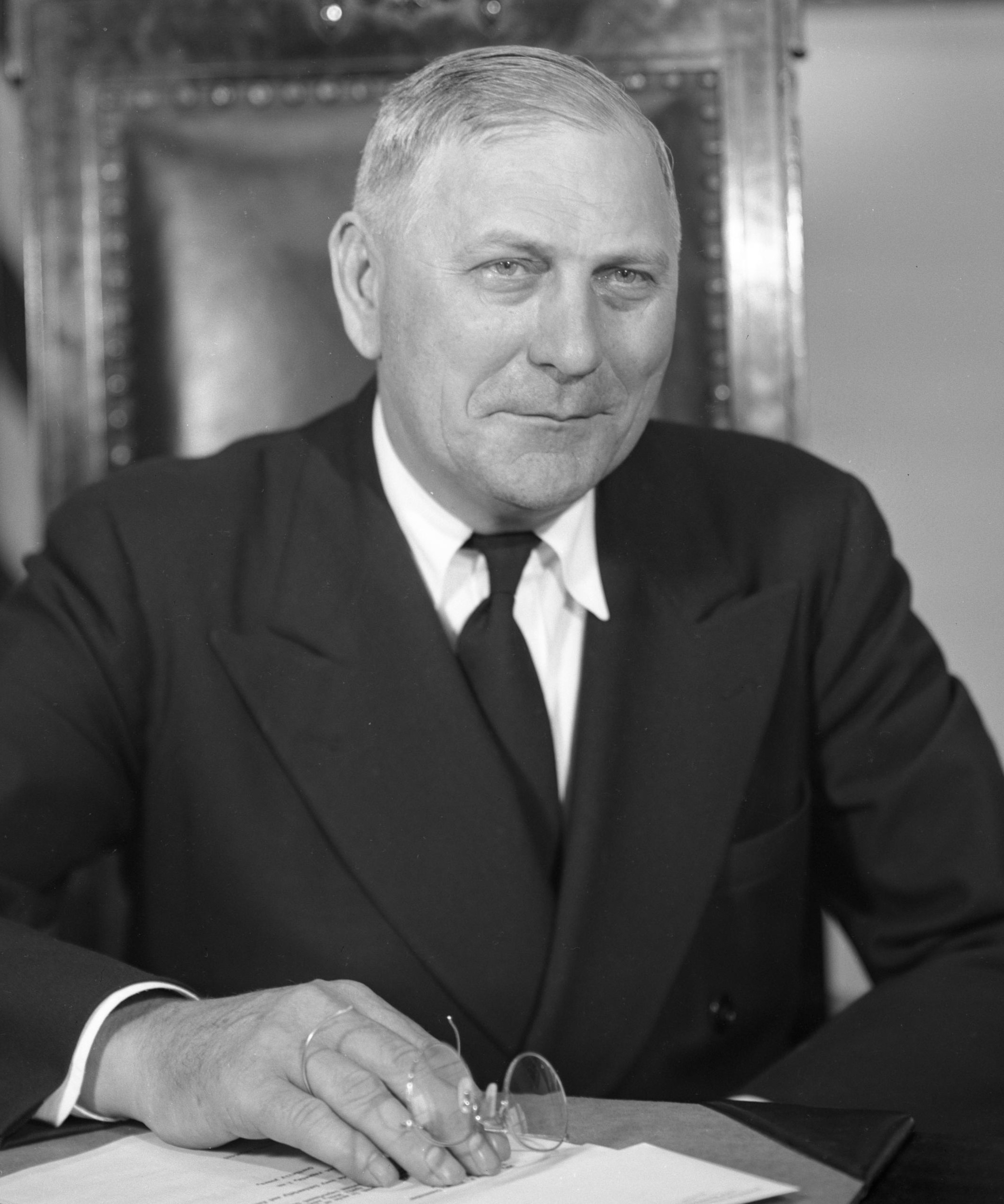
- R. Gregg Cherry, 1945

61st Governor of North Carolina
- In office January 4, 1945 – January 6, 1949
- Lieutenant: Lynton Y. Ballentine
- Preceded by: J. Melville Broughton
- Succeeded by: W. Kerr Scott

Member of the North Carolina Senate from the 26th district
- In office November 5, 1940 – November 7, 1944
- Preceded by: J. H. Separk
- Succeeded by: Stephen B. Dolley

Chair of the North Carolina Democratic Party
- In office July 30, 1937 – August 14, 1940
- Preceded by: J. Wallace Winborne
- Succeeded by: Emery B. Denny

Speaker of the North Carolina House of Representatives
- In office December 10, 1936 – January 4, 1939
- Preceded by: R. Grady Johnson
- Succeeded by: D. L. Ward

Member of the North Carolina House of Representatives from Gaston County
- In office November 4, 1930 – November 5, 1940
- Succeeded by: Basil Whitener

25th Mayor of Gastonia
- In office 1919–1923
- Preceded by: Arthur M. Dixon
- Succeeded by: B. H. Parker

Personal details
- Born: Robert Gregg Cherry; October 17, 1891 York County, South Carolina, U.S.
- Died: June 25, 1957 (aged 65) Gastonia, North Carolina, U.S.
- Party: Democratic
- Spouse: Lula Mildred Stafford (m. 1921)
- Education: Duke University

Military service
- Branch/service: United States Army
- Battles/wars: World War I

Robert Gregg Cherry (October 17, 1891 – June 25, 1957) was an American politician and lawyer who served as the 61st governor of the U.S. state of North Carolina from 1945 to 1949.

== Early life and family ==
=== Childhood, education, and military service ===
Born in York County, South Carolina near Rock Hill, Cherry grew up in Gastonia, North Carolina with relatives after the death of his parents. He earned bachelor's and law degrees at Trinity College (now Duke University). He organized and led a volunteer artillery company during World War I.

=== Marriage ===
In 1921, he married Lula Mildred Stafford, the daughter of the Mayor of Greensboro Emory Junius Stafford.

== Career ==
Cherry served as mayor of Gastonia from 1919 to 1923, as a member and speaker of the North Carolina House of Representatives, as chairman of the North Carolina Democratic Party (1937–1940), and as a member of the North Carolina Senate. In Gastonia, it was joked that he was the best lawyer in town when sober, and the second-best lawyer in town when drunk.

In 1944, Cherry was elected governor as the last in a series of governors affiliated with the political machine of former governor O. Max Gardner. He was sworn in on January 4, 1945. While campaigning for governor, Cherry went, according to one observer,

up and down the state preaching health and hard work, better educational facilities and sound financing, improved opportunities for the state employees, veterans, and teachers, better roads, rural telephone service and electricity for everyone, fair treatment of labor, improved agriculture, conservation and development of the state's resources, tax reduction where possible, and plans for a post-war construction program.

Cherry inherited an economy facing material and labor shortages as a result of the ongoing Second World War. One of his primary focuses during his term was the improvement of mental health care at state-run facilities. Cherry Hospital in Goldsboro, North Carolina, is named for him.

On May 3, 1947, Cherry commuted the death sentences of four men convicted of gang raping a woman. Calvin Covington, Granger Thompson, Stacy Powell, and Cliff Inman had been convicted of raping Dorothy Frye in Lumberton in March 1946. Despite the racial dynamics (all four rapists were black and Frye was white), the crime had drawn less outcry since Frye had entered Lumberton's black section to buy liquor and her husband was a union organizer. She was gang raped after her husband left her waiting in the car. In commuting the sentences of the four convicted rapists to life imprisonment, Cherry blamed the victim.

"After careful consideration, I am convinced that the death penalty is too severe in this case. I believe that the prosecutrix by her own misconduct and failure to observe a sense of propriety placed herself in such a situation as to create a temptation for the defendants to mistreat her and to make her an easy victim of their beastly lusts."

Earlier that year, Cherry had commuted the death sentence of Thomas Lewis, another black man convicted of raping a white woman. The decision came in response to a judge petitioning for clemency, saying that Lewis's accuser, Willie Mae Johnson, was a prostitute with a long criminal record. Other clemency decisions by Cherry, however, had a factual basis. In 1945, he commuted the death sentences of Marvin Matheson, a 15-year-old boy who was convicted of the murder of Chief of Police Dexter A. Millsaps, and Ernest Brooks, a 14-year-old black who was convicted of raping a pregnant white woman in front of her 7-year-old daughter during a burglary. Cherry cited the ages of the two as the reason for his decision.

Unlike other Southern Democrats, Cherry, despite his segregationist views, supported Harry S. Truman for re-election in 1948 and did not join the Dixiecrats. He was succeeded by W. Kerr Scott on January 6, 1949. He retired from politics and returned to the practice of law. Cherry has a plaque dedicated to him in downtown Gastonia, NC.

== Works cited ==
- Cheney, John L. Jr., ed. (1981). North Carolina Government, 1585-1979 : A Narrative and Statistical History (revised ed.). Raleigh: North Carolina Secretary of State. OCLC 1290270510.

North Carolina House of Representatives
Preceded by Clarence Patrick Armstrong; Carl Grady Carpenter	Member of the North Carolina House of Representatives from Gaston County; 1930–1940; Served alongside: John Froneberger Puett, Pinckney Carroll Froneberger, Noah Benjamin Kendrick, David P. Dellinger, Carl Augustus Rudisill	Succeeded by Basil Whitener
Preceded by R. Grady Johnson	Speaker of the North Carolina House of Representatives; 1936–1939	Succeeded by D. L. Ward
North Carolina Senate
Preceded by Joseph H. Separk	Member of the North Carolina Senate from the 26th district 1940–1944	Succeeded by Stephen B. Dolley
Party political offices
Preceded by J. Wallace Winborne	Chair of the Executive Committee of the North Carolina Democratic Party; 1937–1940	Succeeded by Emery B. Denny
Preceded by J. Melville Broughton	Democratic nominee for Governor of North Carolina; 1944	Succeeded by W. Kerr Scott
Political offices
Preceded by J. Melville Broughton	Governor of North Carolina; 1945–1949	Succeeded by W. Kerr Scott
