= John Bridgeman (American politician) =

American real estate executive and politician

Mayor of Gastonia, North Carolina
- In office November 2011 – 2017
- Preceded by: Jennie Stultz
- Succeeded by: Walker Reid

Member of the North Carolina House of Representatives from the 43rd district
- In office 1999–2000

Member of the Gastonia, NC City Council
- In office 1970–1978

Personal details
- Party: Democratic
- Spouse: Nan Falls Bridgeman
- Children: 4
- Education: Gardner–Webb University; UNC Charlotte

John Bridgeman is an American politician and real estate executive. He was a member of the North Carolina House of Representatives representing the 43rd District from 1999 to 2000.

Bridgeman, a member of the Democratic Party, was elected mayor of Gastonia in November 2011 with 45 percent of the vote. He was re-elected in 2015 and voted out in 2017.

== See also ==
- List of mayors of Gastonia, North Carolina
