= Armistead Burwell (judge) =

American judge (1939-1913)

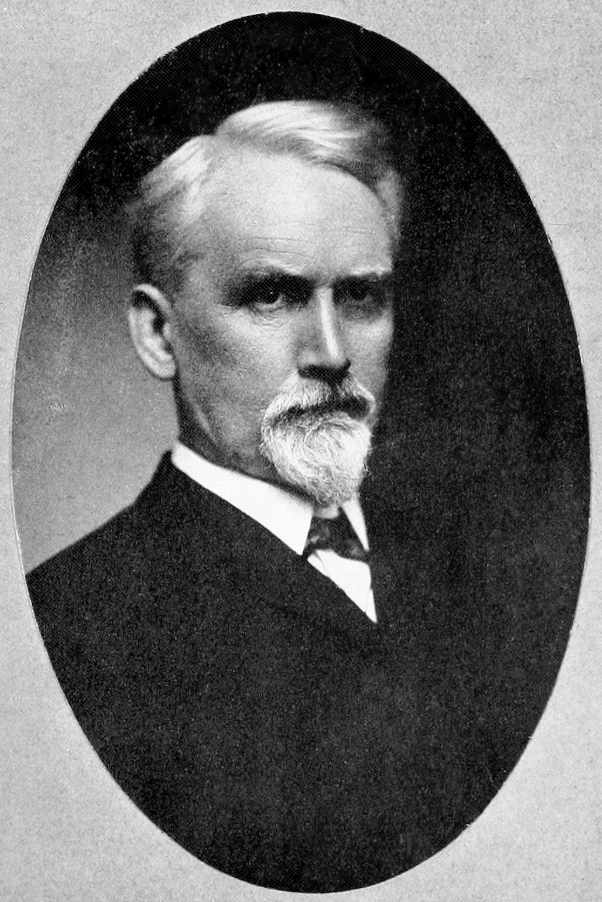

Member of the North Carolina Senate

Associate justice of the North Carolina Supreme Court

Personal details
- Born: October 22, 1839 Hillsborough, North Carolina, U.S.
- Died: May 13, 1913 (aged 73) Charlotte, North Carolina
- Resting place: Elmwood Cemetery, Charlotte, North Carolina
- Education: Davidson College
- Profession: Lawyer

Military service
- Allegiance: United States; Confederate States
- Branch/service: {Confederate States Army
- Rank: Captain
- Unit: 3rd Arkansas Cavalry
- Battles/wars: American Civil War

Armistead Burwell (October 22, 1839 – May 13, 1913) was a teacher, Confederate soldier, lawyer, state senator, and associate justice of the North Carolina Supreme Court.

== Life ==
Burwell was born on October 22, 1839, in Hillsborough, North Carolina. His parents were Rev. Robert Burwell, the Presbyterian pastor there and Margaret Anna (Robertson) Burwell. His parents moved to Charlotte in 1857 and founded the Charlotte Female Institute that year, which is now Queens University of Charlotte.

After graduating from Davidson College in 1859, Burwell became a teacher. At the start of the Civil War, he was living in Princeton, Arkansas. He became the adjutant in Company A of the 3rd Arkansas Cavalry and reached the rank of Captain. His unit saw action in Missouri, Arkansas, Tennessee, Mississippi, and Georgia. He was injured on July 28, 1864 during the Atlanta campaign. He became the assistant adjutant general to Brigadier General F.C. Armstrong.

At war's end, Burwell returned to North Carolina and resumed his teaching in Charlotte. He also studied law and became licensed to practice in 1869.

He entered law partnerships with Calvin E. Grier and then Zebulon Baird Vance, a former Confederate officer and North Carolina governor during the Confederacy, and future United States senator, in a firm named Vance & Burwell. In 1877, he was appointed as a director of the state-owned North Carolina Railroad.

From 1880 to 1900, Burwell was in a law partnership with Platt D. Walker, who also became an Associate Justice (1903–1923) but served after Burwell left the court. This firm was initially Burwell & Walker, then Burwell, Walker & Cansler.

Later in 1880, Burwell was elected from the 29th Senate District to represent Mecklenburg County in the North Carolina Senate of the 84th General Assembly that met in 1881. He also served as city attorney and county attorney, and dean of the Charlotte bar association.

Two days after the November 14, 1892, death of North Carolina Supreme Court Chief Justice Augustus Merrimon, the court elected James E. Shepherd to be the new Chief Justice and Governor Thomas Holt appointed Burwell to fill Shepard's associate justice seat for the remaining three years of an eight-year term. Burwell was not re-elected in the General Election of 1894. He left the court on January 1, 1895 and rejoined his old law firm in Charlotte. Since 1868, the state constitution called for the election of justices by the people.

== Personal ==
Burwell married Ella Maude Jenkins in 1869. They had at least six children, including daughters Ella Maude, Frances Armistead, and son Armistead Burwell, Jr. His wife predeceased him in 1907.

He died at his home in Charlotte on May 13, 1913, and was buried in the Elmwood Cemetery.
