= Heriot Clarkson =

American judge (1863–1942)

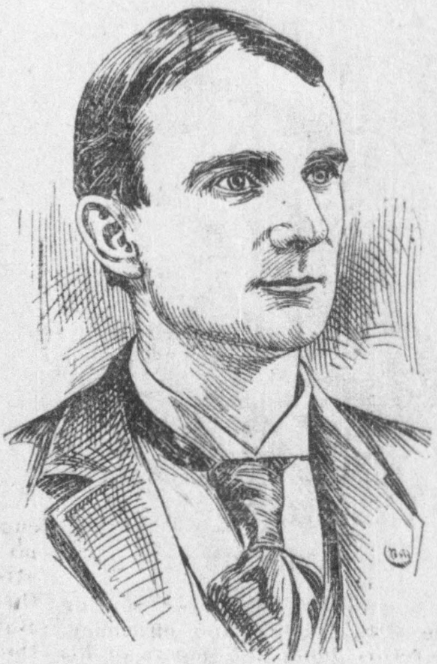
Clarkson c. 1899

Robert Heriot Clarkson (August 21, 1863 – January 27, 1942) was a justice of the North Carolina Supreme Court from 1923 until his death in 1942. He was also one of the leaders of the Prohibition movement in North Carolina, and the movement for white supremacy.

Born in Kingsville (later Kingville), in Richland County, South Carolina, to William Clarkson and Margaret Susan Fullerton Clarkson, Clarkson entered the North Carolina Military Institute in Charlotte in 1873, leaving in 1880 to work as a clerk in the law firm of Jones and Johnston. In 1884, he spent nine months studying law at the University of North Carolina. After his admission to the bar in October of that year, he returned to Charlotte. He served as Alderman and Vice Mayor of Charlotte, from 1887 to 1889, and from 1891 to 1893, and in 1888 entered into a law partnership with Charles H. Duls. In 1896, he founded the first White Supremacy Club in North Carolina, with "white supremacy" and "white labor" as its platform. He helped found the resort community of Little Switzerland, North Carolina.

Clarkson became a friend of, and campaign manager for, Governor Cameron Morrison, who appointed him to the Supreme Court in 1923 to replace Platt D. Walker, who had died. Elected by the state's voters in 1924 and several subsequent times, Clarkson was known to invoke his religious faith in rulings, notably ruled in favor of a creationist preacher in a defamation case, and cited both legal references and the Bible in his rulings. He served until he died in office.

Political offices
| Preceded by Platt D. Walker | Justice of the North Carolina Supreme Court; 1923–1942 | Succeeded by Emery B. Denny |
