= Andrews Geyser =

Fountain in North Carolina

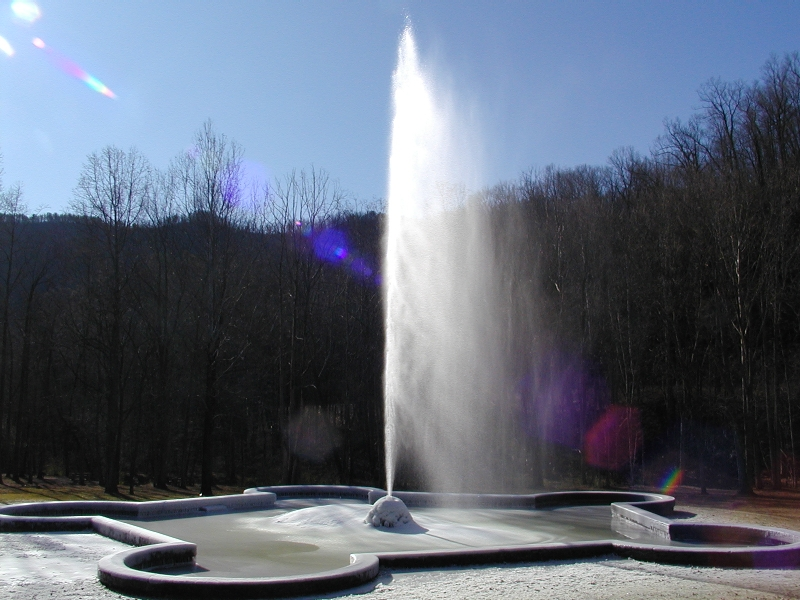
- Andrews Geyser in January, 2009, from its north side. An ice mound is beginning to form near the base.

- Location within North Carolina
- Location: Old Fort, North Carolina, United States
- Nearest city: Asheville
- Coordinates: 35°39′04″N 82°14′30″W
- Designation: Civil War Trails Program
- Established: 1885
- Visitors: 200,000 (in 2008)
- Governing body: Town of Old Fort

Andrews Geyser is a man-made fountain in Old Fort, North Carolina in McDowell County, currently in need of restoration. The fountain is named for Colonel Alexander Boyd Andrews, a North Carolina native who was the Vice President of the Southern Railway Company and one of the people responsible for the construction of the railroad between Old Fort and Asheville, North Carolina, in the late 19th century. The fountain was constructed in 1885 with a dual purpose: it was a feature of the Round Knob Hotel, and a tribute to the approximately 120 individuals who died building the railroad through this particularly treacherous stretch of land, that culminates with the crossing of the Eastern Continental Divide through the Swannanoa Tunnel. The fountain was said to be eye-catching for railroad passengers ascending the 7.5 miles of track and six tunnels that peaks at the top of Swannanoa Gap because it could be seen several times along the route.

The Round Knob Hotel burned to the ground in 1903, and the fountain fell into disrepair. In 1911, George Fisher Baker, a wealthy New York financier and philanthropist who had been friends with Colonel Andrews, funded its restoration. The Southern Railway Company did not grant continuation of the easement for the fountain at that time, so a new, five-sided basin was constructed about 70 yards across Mill Creek, and the piping and nozzle were moved (to the fountain's current location). The Town of Old Fort was given rights to the basin and the pipe that carries the water, and the fountain was formally named Andrews Geyser.

After a pipe broke around 1975, the Southern Railway, which stopped passenger service at that time, turned over the geyser to the town.

The Town of Old Fort continues to use Andrews Geyser and the surrounding area as a public park. Andrews Geyser underwent extensive restoration again in the 1970s, after the Old Fort High School Senior Class of 1971 cleaned up the area and was rededicated on May 6, 1976. Signs at the park describe Mr. Fisher's role in the early 20th century and the role of Old Fort's private citizens in the 1970s in keeping the fountain running.

When in operation, Andrews Geyser shoots water continuously to a height of about 80 feet. Its water supply is drawn from a pond located at the current site of the Inn on Mill Creek, a local Bed & Breakfast. The Inn's property contains the original dam constructed by the railroad in the late 19th century, and the pond formed by the dam with the water of the Long Branch of Mill Creek. A 6-inch-diameter (150 mm) cast iron pipe runs from the dam, through a hidden gate valve, then underground approximately two miles downhill to the fountain. The water comes out a half-inch nozzle pointed skyward, and the 500 feet of elevation difference creates the pressure that drives the fountain. Extended dry condition in the area can limit the ability for the fountain to operate continuously. When the natural water inflow rate to the supply pond falls below the rate at which the fountain draws, the fountain can only be run periodically, at best to match the amount of water inflow over an extended period of time.

In 1967, author John Ehle wrote a historical fiction novel called The Road, which is set in the construction of the railroad from Old Fort to Swannanoa, NC in the late 19th century. The novel concludes with the main character (an amalgam of several real people who oversaw construction of the railroad) making a direct reference to the Andrews Geyser:

Ay, but I'm going to make this fountain and capture that stream up there and bring it down in a trough or a pipe, I don't know just how, and turn it upward at this very place... and let it go as high as it wants to into the sky...

In spite of the name, Andrews Geyser is more accurately a fountain and not a geyser.

In September 2024, the remnants of Hurricane Helene destroyed the fountain, and eighteen months later, it is uncertain when it will be restored.
