= Alexander Boyd Andrews =

American railroad executive (1841–1915)

Alexander B. Andrews
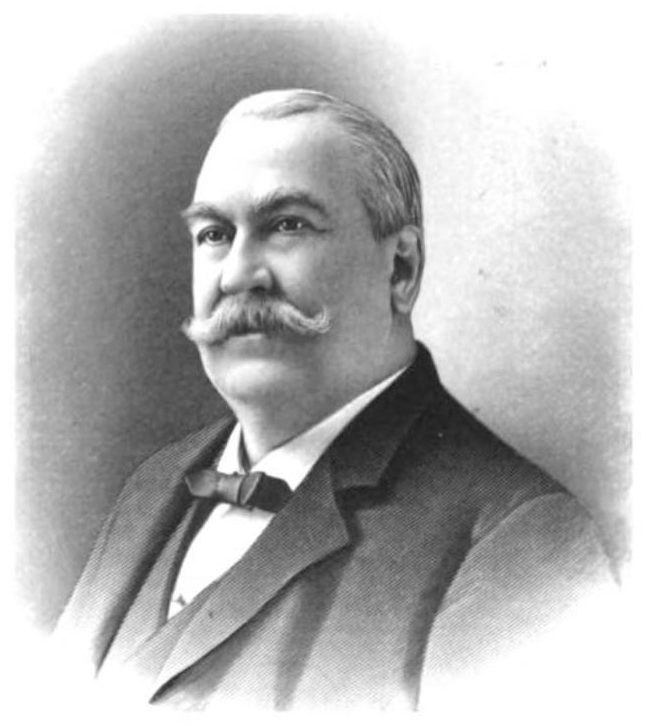
- Portrait of Andrews, c. 1905
- Born: Alexander Boyd Andrews; July 23, 1841; Franklin, North Carolina, U.S.
- Died: April 17, 1915 (aged 73); Raleigh, North Carolina, U.S.
- Burial place: Historic Oakwood Cemetery
- Occupations: Businessman; engineer
- Political party: Democratic
- Spouse: Julia Martha Johnston (m. 1869)
- Children: 5
- Military career
- Allegiance: Confederate States
- Branch: Confederate States Army
- Service years: 1861–1864
- Rank: Captain
- Conflict: American Civil War

Alexander Boyd Andrews (July 23, 1841 – April 17, 1915) was a North Carolinian engineer and railroad executive. He was also a Confederate veteran of the American Civil War.

== Family origins ==
Through many generations, the ancestors of Alexander Boyd Andrews were North Carolinians. The first of the Andrews family to come into North Carolina was Thomas Andrews, who in 1726 patented 200 acres (81 ha) of land in the lower end of Bertie, and twelve years later purchased a tract on the north side of the Roanoke, then called the Morratuck River, adjoining the lands of George Williams, in the upper part of Bertie, near the Northampton line, and there made his home. He was joined in 1749 by William Andrews and Samuel, who came from Southampton County, Virginia, where many of that family were living as early as the year 1700.

One of the sons of William Andrews, Abner, married Mary Williams, a daughter of his neighbor, George Williams, about the year 1750, and had three children, one of whom, John, was born in 1754. He married first a Miss Reaves, but she dying, he subsequently located in Pitt County, where he married Elizabeth Bell, a widow, a daughter of Major Jonas Johnston, a veteran of the Revolution, who fell at Stono; and by her he had two sons, William J. and Abner J., and two daughters. Young William J. Andrews, after the death of his father, passed his youth at Woodbourne, and received his education there and at Palmyra, in Martin County, and located at Old Sparta, in Edgecombe, where he engaged in business as a merchant. At Shocco Springs, the fashionable resort of Eastern and Middle Carolina, he met Virginia Hawkins, a daughter of Colonel John D. Hawkins, and on May 9, 1833, they were married. Andrews continued to reside in Edgecombe until about 1840, when he removed to Franklin, and two miles west of Franklinton Alexander Boyd was born; but shortly afterward Andrews moved to Henderson, where he soon died, and the children were raised by their maternal grandparents, Colonel and Mrs. John D. Hawkins.

Through his mother, Colonel Andrews was a descendant of the Hawkins family, prominent in English history as well as in the annals of the Southern States. Sir John Hawkins, the admiral, was one of Queen Elizabeth's captains in the destruction of the Spanish Armada. One of his descendants, Philemon, came to Virginia in 1715, dying in Gloucester County ten years later. His second son, of the same name, removed to Bute County, in North Carolina, and soon became a man of prominence, his home being a seat of elegant hospitality, and he being a notable patriot during the Revolutionary War. His son Benjamin, because of his proficiency in modern languages, served at Washington's headquarters as an interpreter for the French officers on his staff. He was also a member of the Continental Congress, and he and Sam Johnston were the first senators chosen to represent the State in the United States Senate; and he held many other important positions. Another son was Colonel John Hawkins, who married a sister of the Hon. Nathaniel Macon; and their eldest son, Philemon, married Lucy Davis, one of whose sons was Governor William Hawkins, the war governor during the period of the second war with Great Britain. Of their daughters, Eleanor married Sherwood Haywood; Delia married the Hon. George E. Badger; Ann, William P. Little; Lucy, Louis D. Henry; and Sarah, Colonel William Polk, one of her sons being Bishop Polk, who was also a general during the Civil War.

The eldest son of Philemon and Lucy Hawkins was Colonel John D. Hawkins, a graduate of the University of North Carolina, and for 50 years a trustee of that institution. He was a lawyer and planter and prominent as a political leader. Не married Miss Jane A. Boyd, and among their sons were General P. B. Hawkins, Dr. Alexander B. Hawkins, and Dr. William J. Hawkins, for many years the president of the Raleigh and Gaston Railroad Company and the president of the Citizens' National Bank; and among their daughters was Virginia, who married William J. Andrews of Edgecombe County, and became the mother of Alexander Boyd.

== Early life ==
Alexander Boyd Andrews was born near Franklinton, in Franklin County, North Carolina, on July 23, 1841. In childhood, he enjoyed the freedoms of country life. He was educated at the Henderson Male Academy, and being well advanced, in January 1859, at the age of 17, he was employed as a clerk by his uncle, General P. B. Hawkins, who had a large contract for building a part of the Old Blue Ridge Railroad, and whose business centered in Pendleton, South Carolina. The Blue Ridge Railroad Company had been formed with a view of constructing a trunk line through what is known as Rabun Gap, which marks the lines between the States of Georgia and North Carolina, and the course of the Little Tennessee River was a more practicable route for a railroad to the West than that adopted earlier by the Louisville, Cincinnati and Charleston Railroad Company. The contemplated route was from Anderson Court House via Walhalla, South Carolina; Franklin, North Carolina; and Knoxville, Tennessee, on to Cincinnati. But after US$2,500,000 had been spent in the construction of the line, the enterprise was abandoned; however, in 1861 the road was built to Walhalla.

After six months' service as clerk, Andrews, aged seventeen, was promoted and made superintendent and purchasing agent by General Hawkins, and held that position until the latter part of 1860, when the contract being finished, he returned to North Carolina. While engaged on this work, offers were made to him of other positions, which were declined, as he preferred to continue and finish the construction he had undertaken.

== Civil War ==
Being at home when the Civil War broke out in the spring of 1861, he responded to the call of the State and enlisted as a Confederate soldier. On May 10, 1861, he was appointed Second Lieutenant of Company E, 1st North Carolina Cavalry (9th North Carolina State troops), Colonel Robert Ransom commanding; and on September 23 he was promoted to First Lieutenant and transferred to Company В. Не accompanied his regiment to Virginia, and did duty at Manassas; one of their early engagements being near the village of Vienna, fifteen miles from Alexandria. When in December the first cavalry brigade was formed, General J. E. B. Stuart being the brigadier, the regiment was placed in that brigade; but in the spring of 1862, Eastern North Carolina being invaded by the Federal troops of Burnside's expedition, it was ordered to the protection of the eastern counties, and took position near Kinston, remaining in that vicinity until about the middle of June, when it was directed to return to Richmond, then threatened by McClellan.

On the way to Weldon, Captain Whitaker of Company B being temporarily absent, and Lieutenant Andrews having the command, information was received that three Federal gunboats had passed Jamesville on their way to destroy the railroad bridge at Weldon. Lieutenant Andrews hastily led his company to Poplar Point, about ten miles from Williamston, where he stationed a detachment, while he conducted the remainder to Rainbow Banks, afterward known as Fort Branch, two miles east of Hamilton, and there he awaited the approach of the gunboats. The leading gunboat, under the command of Lieutenant Flusser, notwithstanding the rapid fire of the cavalry, successfully passed and landed 125 marines and two pieces of artillery at Hamilton, but proceeded no further; and on its return it was again so vigorously attacked that the Federal expedition was abandoned without accomplishing any result. This is the only instance recalled of a cavalry company successfully resisting and driving back a force of gunboats. On July 12 following this engagement, Lieutenant Andrews was promoted to the captaincy of his company, and with the regiment he participated in all the cavalry movements around Richmond and in the Maryland campaign, culminating in the capture of Harper's Ferry and ending at the battle of Sharpsburg.

He accompanied Stuart in his raid around McClellan's army on October 9, the command penetrating as far as Chambersburg, and bringing out more than a thousand led horses, and on that expedition the regiment performed conspicuous service. During that autumn and winter the regiment was in many engagements, and it fought single-handed, under Colonel Baker, the hot action at Kelly's Ford; and it was in the thickest of the fight and the longest on the field at the battle of Brandy Station, Major McClellan, in his Life of Stuart, making special mention of the work done by it on that occasion.

Captain Andrews passed through the war without injury, though he had his horse killed under him at Upperville. He was with Stuart in his detour around Meade's army in the Gettysburg campaign, the regiment occupying Carlyle, Pennsylvania, and participating in more than a dozen actions. After the return to Virginia, it was in the hard fight at Jack's Shop, on September 22, 1863, Company B being in the advance. Неге, while cheering on his men, Captain Andrews fell, shot through the lung, the ball striking the spinal column and removing a piece of the bone. The wound at first was thought mortal, and a correspondent writing at the time to the Fayetteville Observer said: "No braver or better man has fallen during the war. He was universally beloved by all." But Captain Andrews did not die, although long confined to the hospital. Anxious to be with his command, while still very weak and having hemorrhages, he sought the camp, but was compelled by his physical condition to return to the hospital. On two other occasions he attempted to resume service with his company, but his wound incapacitated him for active duty, and it becoming obvious that he could not perform his duty as captain, he abided by the advice of the surgeons, and in justice to his subordinate officers, was retired іп the fall of 1864.

In December 1861, Colonel Robert Ransom desired to execute a very dangerous raid, and ordered a detail of 200 picked men and selected officers. Lieutenant Andrews learning of this detail, asked the adjutant to select him as one of the lieutenants. Colonel Ransom overhearing the conversation, lectured him on volunteering to place himself in danger, saying: "Having confidence in your ability and soldierly qualifications, you are one of the first I ordered put upon the detail, but if I had not selected you, I would not now yield to your request. Should you be wounded or killed in the line of duty, having been detailed, it would be the fortune of war, but no one should voluntarily seek to imperil his life."

During his connection with the army of Northern Virginia his service was mostly along the line of the old Orange and Alexandria Railroad, running from Alexandria to Lynchburg, and in the years to come Andrews would be the president of that very line, as well as the first vice-president of the system stretching from Washington City to the Mississippi River with its branches and controlled roads comprising nearly 9000 mi (14484 km).

== Later life ==
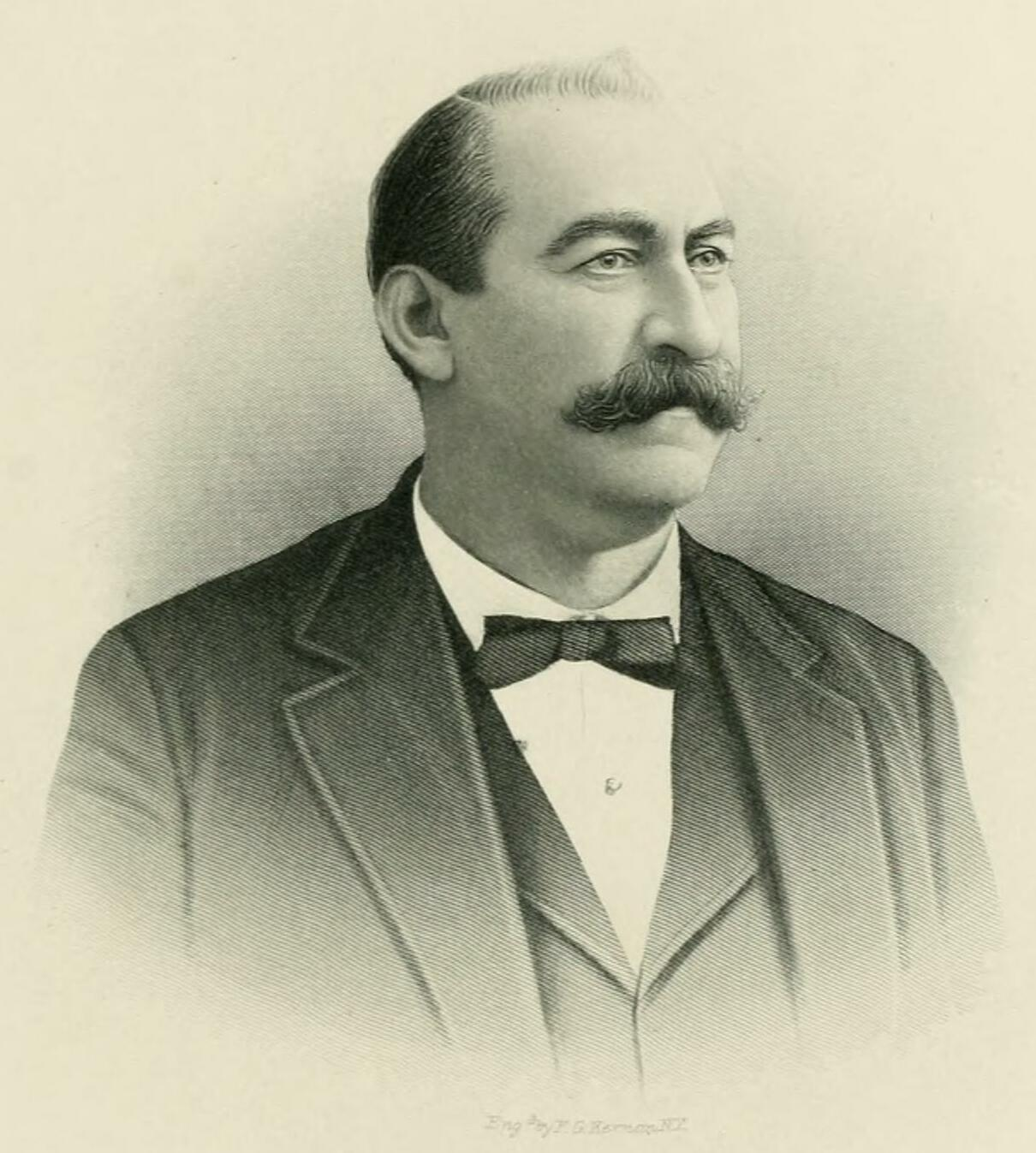

Having been paroled on the surrender of Johnston's army at Greensboro, he returned home with health still impaired, the hemorrhages from his wound continuing, and with only two horses and two silver dollars as his worldly possessions. The war had swept away what little property that belonged to the family, and as several sisters and a younger brother were dependent on him, he realized the necessity of some immediate employment. He had noticed that because the railroad bridges at Weldon and Gaston had been destroyed the passengers were transferred across the Roanoke in an ordinary flat-bottomed ferry boat, and after an investigation he concluded that profitable employment might be obtained by undertaking the transfer of passengers, freight, baggage and mail across the river. He formulated a proposition to that end, which was accepted by the several railroad companies, and building a log house near Gaston, he remained there directing the work of transferring freight and passengers until May 1866, when the new bridge at Weldon was completed.

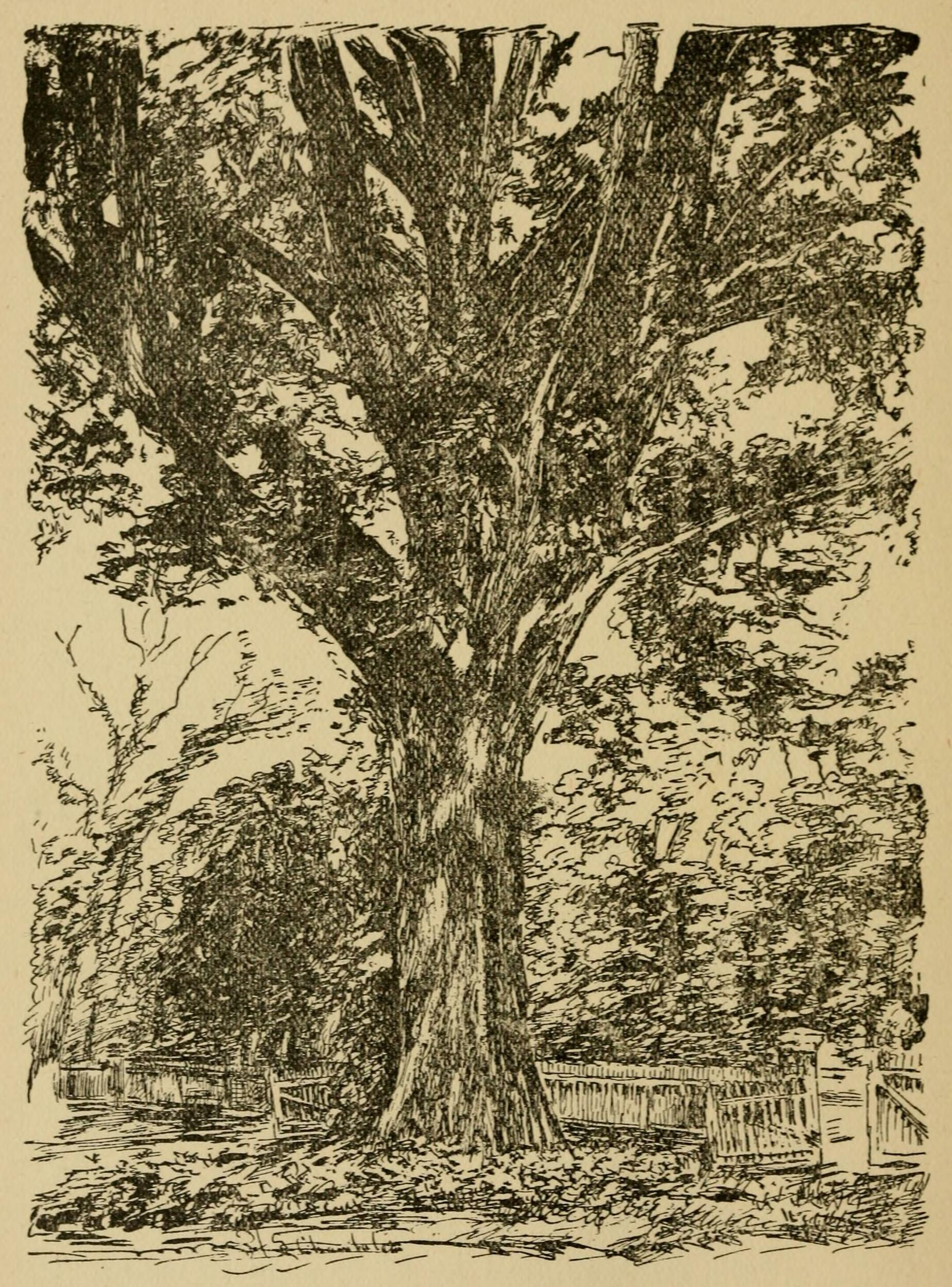
A great white oak, called the "Henry Clay Tree". It was said to be the tallest tree in Raleigh, as well as the most historic. It stood in the yard of A. B. Andrews.

When the necessity for his services in that connection had ceased, Andrews engaged in business at Henderson until July 1867, when he received a telegram from one of the directors of the Raleigh and Gaston Railroad informing him that he had been chosen superintendent of that road, and asking if he would accept it. After a conference with the directors, he accepted the position, and was soon appointed general superintendent. The next year he was elected also superintendent of the Chatham Railroad, later known as the Raleigh and Augusta Air Line, and later still a part of the Seaboard Air Line, and under his supervision 56 mi (90 km) of that road were constructed.

In 1871, the Richmond and Danville Railroad Company secured a lease of the North Carolina Railroad, running from Charlotte to Goldsboro, for a term of 30 years, and the executive officers of that company coming in contact with Andrews and appreciating his capacity to manage railroad property, offered him the superintendency of that line, which he accepted on November 1, 1875, and left the service of the Raleigh and Gaston; and he held that position for 11 years, when he was promoted to the third vice-presidency of the Richmond and Danville. From 1878 to 1880, at the solicitation of the governor of North Carolina, Governor Jarvis, he acted as superintendent of the Atlantic and North Carolina Railroad, which was virtually owned and controlled by the State, and he sought to operate it in conjunction with the North Carolina Railroad, making a through line from the mountains to the sea.

In 1881, the Western North Carolina Railroad, which was also virtually owned by the State, was, under an act passed at a special session of the legislature, sold to a syndicate of New York capitalists composed of William J. Best, William R. Grace, J. Nelson Tappin and James D. Fish, under a contract which provided for: reimbursing the State for money expended for the purchase of the road іп 1875 and subsequent construction, amounting in the aggregate to US$1,400,000, for the payment of all convict labor on the road, and for the completion of the two branches of the great work to Paint Rock and to Murphy. The Best syndicate failed in the performance of their contract, and sold to Messrs. Clyde, Buford & Logan, who bought in the interest of the Richmond and Danville Railroad, and in 1881 Andrews was elected president of the company for the purpose of completing the road from Old Fort to the two termini as required. The construction of this important line through the mountains was fraught with many troubles and difficulties, both political and financial, and necessitated a great deal of legislation for several years. Indeed, at one time the Richmond and Danville Railroad Company withdrew its support and financial backing, as the completion of the branch to Murphy seemed a penalty out of proportion to the benefit that would accrue from the construction of the road to the Tennessee line. Andrews, however, having entered upon the work, would not agree to its being stopped, and as he had pledged himself to the State and to the legislature that he would finish it if certain legislation were adopted and certain convict labor furnished, he personally assumed large liabilities to continue it, and exerted all his influence to persuade the Richmond and Danville Railroad Company to again undertake its construction. With much difficulty he accomplished his purpose, and the Richmond and Danville reluctantly consented to resume the work, and relieved him of the personal obligations he had assumed.

Under his administration, the Western North Carolina paid in full all the debt due to the State under the Best contract, and on one occasion made a single payment of US$600,000, which relieved the State from the necessity of levying any public tax that year.

Two years later the Richmond and Danville, recognizing Andrews's ability and capacity, made him assistant to the president, which position he occupied until 1886, when he became third vice-president; and three years later he was appointed second vice-president, with a larger scope of duties, and he continued to hold that position until 1892, when the company, becoming involved, passed into the hands of receivers. But Andrews's management had been so satisfactory and his administrative ability was so highly appreciated that the receivers appointed him their general agent, and continued him in the management of the property until the Southern Railway Company, which was organized in June 1894, purchased all the lines formerly known as the Richmond and Danville Railroad; and at the first meeting of the directors of the new company he was elected second vice-president, and the next year he was promoted to the position of first vice-president; and since then he held the next to the highest official position in the Southern Railway Com- pany, which in 1905 operated nearly 9000 mi (14,484 km) of railroad.

Notwithstanding the many changes in the ownership of the Richmond and Danville Railroad, and in the directory, and in the executive head, and the subsequent reorganization of the property into the great Southern Railway system, Andrews was always retained in an executive capacity, and each succeeding change brought him recognition of his abilities for management. Promotion followed promotion, and by 1905 he had for 10 years held the highest office in the company, except alone the presidency. In addition to his other offices and duties, Andrews was president of the Charlotte, Columbia and Augusta Railroad Company, of the Columbia and Greenville, the Virginia Midland, the Northwestern North Carolina, the Oxford and Clarksville, the Oxford and Henderson, the Atlantic, Tennessee and Ohio, the Statesville and Western and the Piedmont Railroad Company, all of which were in 1894 reorganized and brought into the Southern Railway system. In 1905 he was president of the Southern Railway, Carolina division, which comprised what was at one time the old South Carolina Railroad, the Spartanburg, Union and Columbia, the Asheville and Spartanburg, the South Carolina and Georgia Extension Company, with its road from Camden to Marion, North Carolina; the North Carolina Midland, the High Point, Randleman, Asheboro and Southern, the Atlantic and Yadkin, the Elberton Air Line, the Hartwell, the Roswell, the Yadkin, the Charlottesville and Rapidan, the Carolina and Tennessee Southern, the Tennessee and Carolina Southern, the Ensley Southern and the Warrior Southern; all of which were independent railroad companies, although they were operated as a part of the Southern system. Under his management many of these roads were projected and constructed, while others have been greatly improved, and the whole system was, with a vast outlay and unremitting care, brought up to a higher state of efficiency; and so great was the development of traffic under his management that a large portion of the through line was in 1905 being laid in double track as being necessary for prompt transportation.

Besides his railroad operations, Andrews was a director of the Sloss-Sheffield Steel and Iron Company of Birmingham, Alabama, one of the largest coal and iron producing companies of the country at that time, and he was one of the organizers of the Citizens' National Bank of Raleigh, having been a director continuously since its organization in 1871, and a long-serving vice-president of the institution.

Andrews never sought political office, preferring to devote himself to the management of the railroad committed to his care, and building up the Southern country, and especially the undeveloped regions of Western North Carolina. At one time, however, he was a member of the Board of Aldermen at Henderson, and also of the city of Raleigh, and he served as an aide-de-camp with the rank of colonel on the staff of Governor Vance, and also on the staff of Governor Jarvis. In 1886, President Cleveland appointed him a commissioner, as a representative of the United States Government, to examine part of the North Pacific Railroad and to make a report on the condition and value of that property. This appointment was conferred on Andrews because of his long experience in railroad construction and operation. During the administration of Governor Fowle, he was nominated by the governor and appointed by the President as one of the State commissioners to the Columbian Exposition at Chicago, and upon the organization of the national committee in 1890, he became fifth vice-president; and at its close he was selected as one of the committee of awards and a member of the executive committee appointed to wind up the affairs of the exposition.

He also served as a trustee of the University of North Carolina since 1885, and he was a member of the executive committee and also of the finance committee. He was one of the original organizers of the Soldiers' Home established at Raleigh, and took a great interest in its enlargement and management, and became president and chairman of the board of directors.

The town of Andrews, North Carolina, was established in 1890 and named for him after he bought 50 acres in the area to build a railway commissary. The town was incorporated in 1905. In 1899, Andrews proposed the name for the town of Dillsboro, North Carolina.

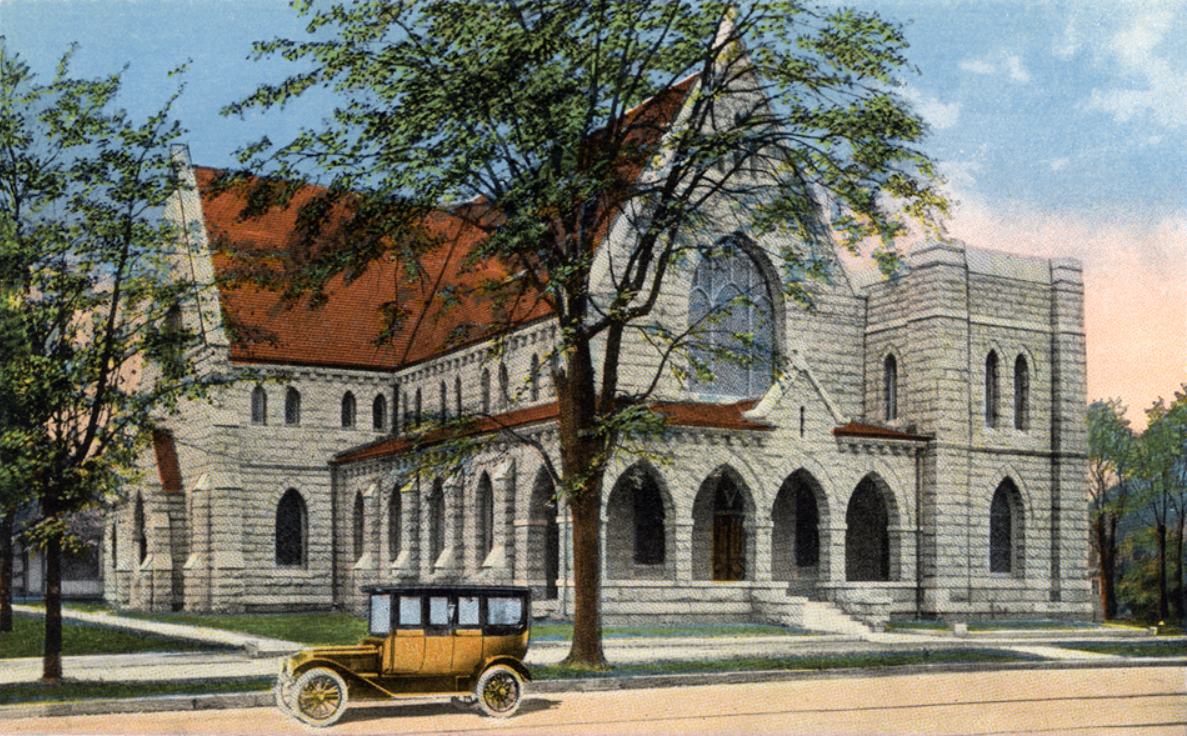
Episcopal Church of the Good Shepherd, Raleigh, NC

Andrews was a communicant of the Protestant Episcopal Church, and was long connected with the Church of the Good Shepherd at Raleigh, and toward its support and maintenance he was a liberal contributor. Не was also a leading spirit in the Capital Club at Raleigh, and did much to maintain that social organization at the State capital. He was a Master Mason, and a Royal Arch Mason, and Knight Templar, and a Shriner. His political affiliations were with the Democratic Party. He died at his residence, 407 North Blount Street, Raleigh, aged 73, and was interred with Masonic rites at Oakwood Cemetery.

== Personal life ==
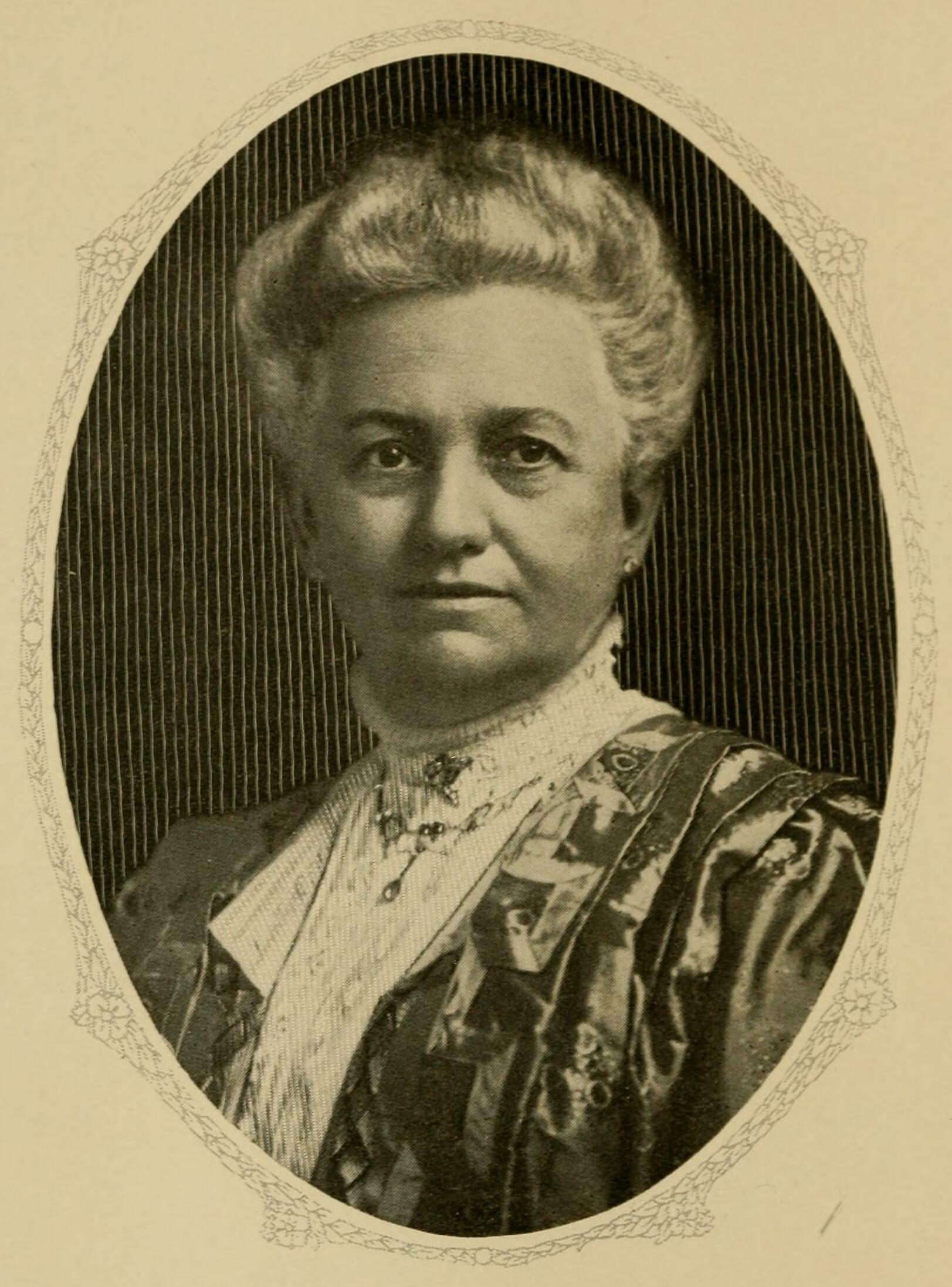
Mrs. Alexander Boyd Andrews

On September 15, 1869, Andrews was united in marriage to Miss Julia Martha Johnston, a daughter of Colonel William and Mrs. Anna E. Johnston of Charlotte; and to them were born five children.

- William J. Andrews, the oldest, was a mechanical and electrical engineer, and president of the Raleigh Electric Company, and married Miss Augusta W. Ford of Covington, Kentucky.
- Alexander Boyd Andrews Jr. was a member of the North Carolina Bar.
- Jane Hawkins, their only daughter, was married to a prominent cotton exporter of Montgomery, Alabama, William M. Marks.
- John H. Andrews was in the traffic department of the railway service.
- Graham H. Andrews began active life in the Citizens' National Bank of Raleigh.

== See also ==
- Andrews-Duncan House
- Andrews Geyser
- Timeline of Raleigh, North Carolina
- History of North Carolina

== Sources ==
- Ashe, S. A. (1905). "Alexander Boyd Andrews". Ashe, S. A. (ed.). Biographical History of North Carolina. Vol. 1. Greensboro, NC: Charles L. Van Noppen. pp. 45–59.
- Chamberlain, Hope Summerell (1922). History of Wake County, North Carolina: With Sketches of Those Who Have Most Influenced Its Development. Raleigh, NC: Edwards & Broughton. pp. 111, 121, 167, 254, 256, 259.
- Steelman, Bennett L. (1979). "Andrews, Alexander Boyd, 23 July 1841–17 Apr. 1915". Powell, William S. (ed.). Dictionary of North Carolina Biography. Vol. 1. Chapel Hill, NC: University of North Carolina Press. pp. 34–36.
