= List of mayors of Gastonia, North Carolina =

The following is a list of mayors of the city of Gastonia, North Carolina, USA. Gastonia is in Gaston County.

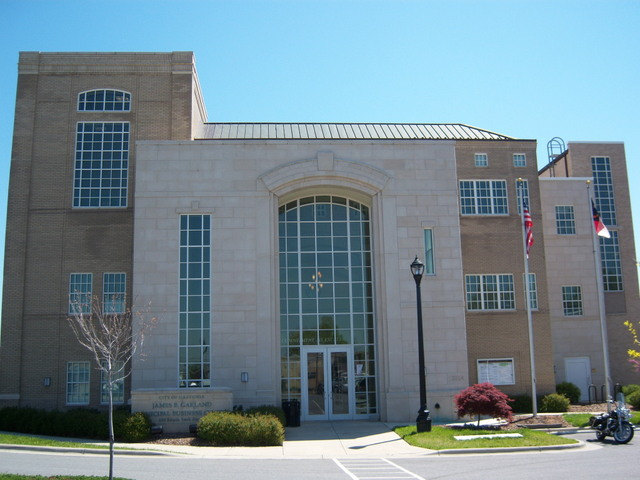
Gastonia city hall building in North Carolina, US, in 2008

== Mayors ==
- J.K. Dixon, 1888–1889, 1904-1906
- Thos. L. Craig, ca.1910
- Arthur Mills Dixon, ca.1917-1918
- R. Gregg Cherry, 1919-1923
- Wiley T. Rankin, ca.1927
- Emery B. Denny, 1929-1937
- W. Harrelson Yancey, ca.1952-1955
- Leon L. Schneider, ca.1956-1957
- Vic Phillips, ca.1963
- Roland E. Bradley, ca.1975-1976
- Thebaud “T.” Jeffers, 1976-1984
- Glendell Brooks, ca.1984
- Jennifer Thomas Stultz, 1999-2011
- John Bridgeman, 2011–2017
- Walker E. Reid III, 2017-2023
- Richard Franks, 2024–present

== See also ==
- Gastonia history
