= 1944 North Carolina gubernatorial election =

- November 7, 1944
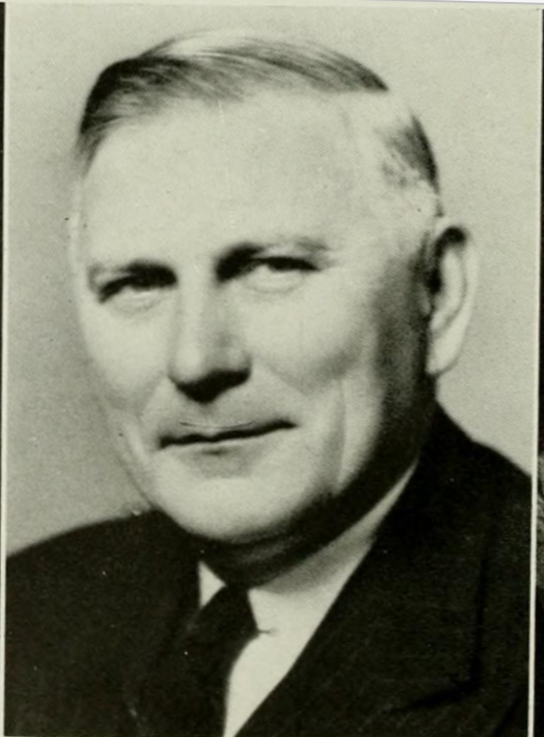

Nominee	R. Gregg Cherry	Frank C. Patton
Party	Democratic	Republican
Popular vote	528,995	230,998
Percentage	69.61%	30.40%
- County results Cherry: 50–60% 60–70% 70–80% 80–90% >90% Patton: 50–60% 60–70% 70–80%
Governor before election
J. Melville Broughton
Democratic
Elected Governor
R. Gregg Cherry
Democratic

The 1944 North Carolina gubernatorial election was held on November 7, 1944. Democratic nominee R. Gregg Cherry defeated Republican nominee Frank C. Patton with 69.61% of the vote.

== Primary elections ==
Primary elections were held on May 27, 1944.

=== Democratic primary ===
==== Candidates ====
- R. Gregg Cherry, former chairman of the North Carolina Democratic Party
- Ralph W. McDonald, former member of the North Carolina House of Representatives
- Olla Ray Boyd

==== Results ====
Democratic primary results
Party	Candidate	Votes	%
Democratic	R. Gregg Cherry	185,027	57.51
Democratic	Ralph McDonald	134,661	41.85
Democratic	Olla Ray Boyd	2,069	0.64
Total votes		321,757	100.00

== General election ==
=== Candidates ===
- R. Gregg Cherry, Democratic
- Frank C. Patton, Republican, former United States Attorney for the Western District of North Carolina

=== Results ===
1944 North Carolina gubernatorial election
Party	Candidate	Votes	%	±%
Democratic	R. Gregg Cherry	528,995	69.61%	
Republican	Frank C. Patton	230,998	30.40%	
Majority		297,997		
Turnout				
Democratic hold		Swing		
