= R. Hunt Parker =

American politician

Robert Hunt Parker (1892–1969) was an American jurist who served as an associate justice and chief justice of the North Carolina Supreme Court.

Born in Enfield, North Carolina, on February 15, 1892, Parker served in the United States Army during World War I. He was elected to the North Carolina House of Representatives and served one term (1923–24). He was a state superior court judge, 1932–1952; associate justice of the state supreme court, 1952–66; and finally Chief Justice of the state supreme court, 1966-69. Parker died in office on November 10, 1969.

The North Carolina Literary & Historical Association sponsors the R. Hunt Parker Memorial Award in his memory.

Legal offices
Preceded by Emery B. Denny	Chief Justice of the North Carolina Supreme Court; 1966–1969	Succeeded by William H. Bobbitt
