= Arrowhead Monument =

- Location within North Carolina
- Location: Old Fort, North Carolina, United States
- Nearest city: Asheville
- Coordinates: 35.6290°N 82.1815°W
- Established: February 1, 1931
- Visitors: 200,000 (in 2008)
- Governing body: Old Fort City Council

The Arrowhead Monument is located in the town square of Old Fort, North Carolina. It is a 30-foot (9.1 m) tall arrowhead, hand-carved from granite. This significant landmark was unveiled to an audience of over 6,000 on July 27, 1930, by Martha Nesbitt, symbolizing the peace that was established between pioneers and Native Americans in the previous century. Local Catawba community leaders also attended the unveiling. The monument was a familiar sight for travelers through Western North Carolina, as a tall, hand-carved arrowhead in front of the depot, signaling a stop in the historic town of Old Fort.

The Arrowhead Monument remains as of 2023. It is decorated for holidays including Christmas and the Fourth of July.
