= Henry Clay Oak =

Former oak tree in North Carolina

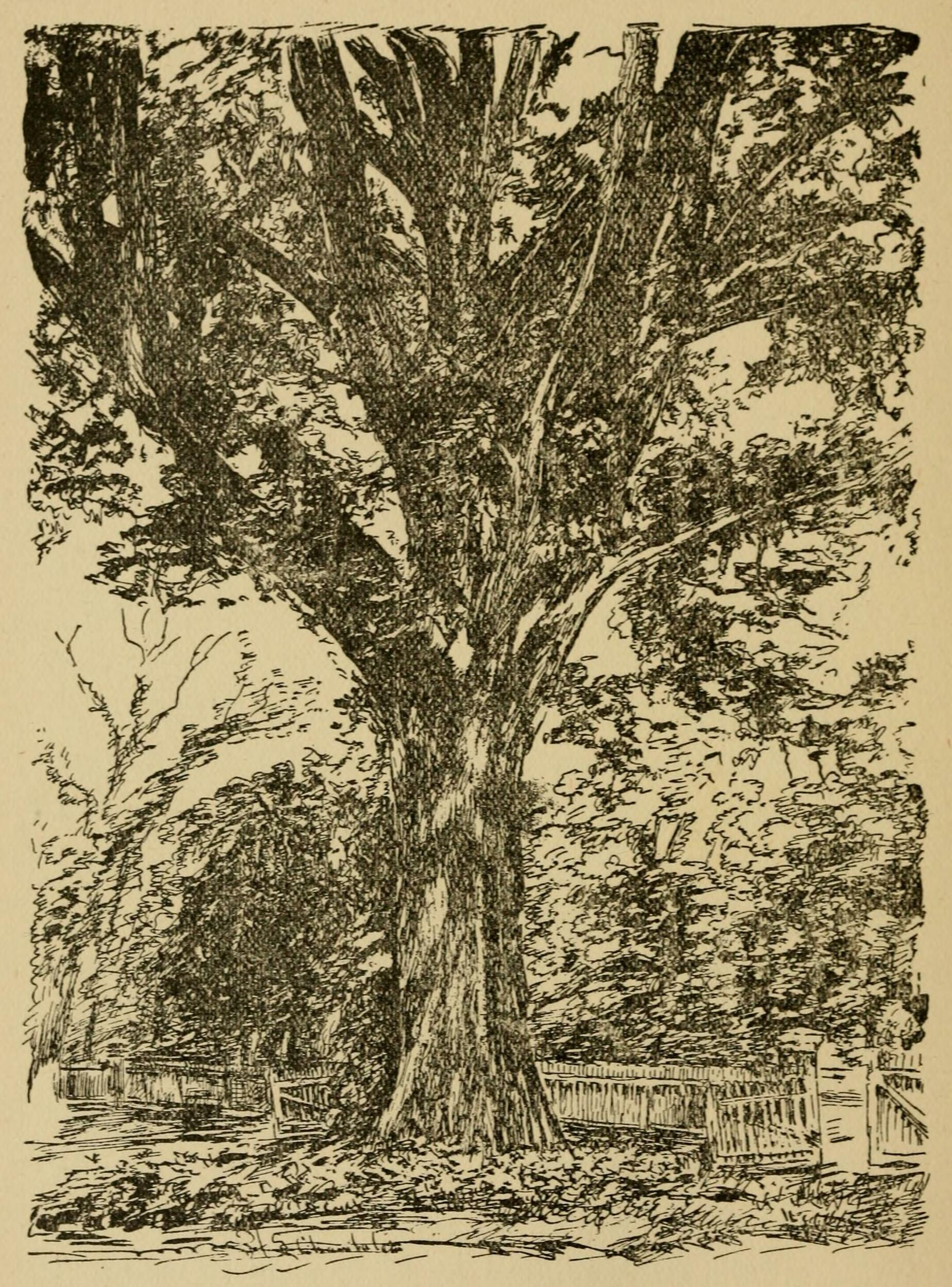
A great white oak, called the "Henry Clay Tree". It was said to be the tallest tree in Raleigh, as well as the most historic.

The Henry Clay Oak, also called the Henry Clay Tree, was a historic white oak which grew to a prodigious height and girth in the city of Raleigh, North Carolina, possibly predating the founding of the city in 1792, until, stricken by disease and the elements, it was cut down by the local authorities in 1991.

== History ==
The tree became established in a side-yard of the house built for William Polk in 1815, and according to local tradition, Henry Clay wrote his famous Raleigh Letter of April 17, 1844, in which he vigorously opposes the annexation of Texas by the United States and foreshadows war with Mexico, while resting under its shade.

The land, and the Henry Clay Oak, later became the property of Colonel Alexander B. Andrews.

A historic marker for the tree was erected in 1938 by the Colonel Polk Chapter of the Daughters of the Revolution.

== Biology ==
The Henry Clay Oak grew to a height in excess of 100 ft (30.5 m), with a 100 ft spread and a trunk diameter of 6½ ft (2 m). Damage from the elements and disease led the local authorities to cut down the dying tree on October 9, 1991.

== See also ==
- List of individual trees

== Sources ==
- Chamberlain, Hope Summerell (1922). History of Wake County, North Carolina: With Sketches of Those Who Have Most Influenced Its Development. Raleigh, NC: Edwards & Broughton. p. 256.
- Murray, Elizabeth Reid (2006). "Henry Clay Oak". Powell, William S. (ed.). Encyclopedia of North Carolina. Chapel Hill, NC: University of North Carolina Press. pp. 559–560.
