= Old Fort Commercial Historic District =

Historic district in North Carolina, United States

- U.S. National Register of Historic Places
- U.S. Historic district
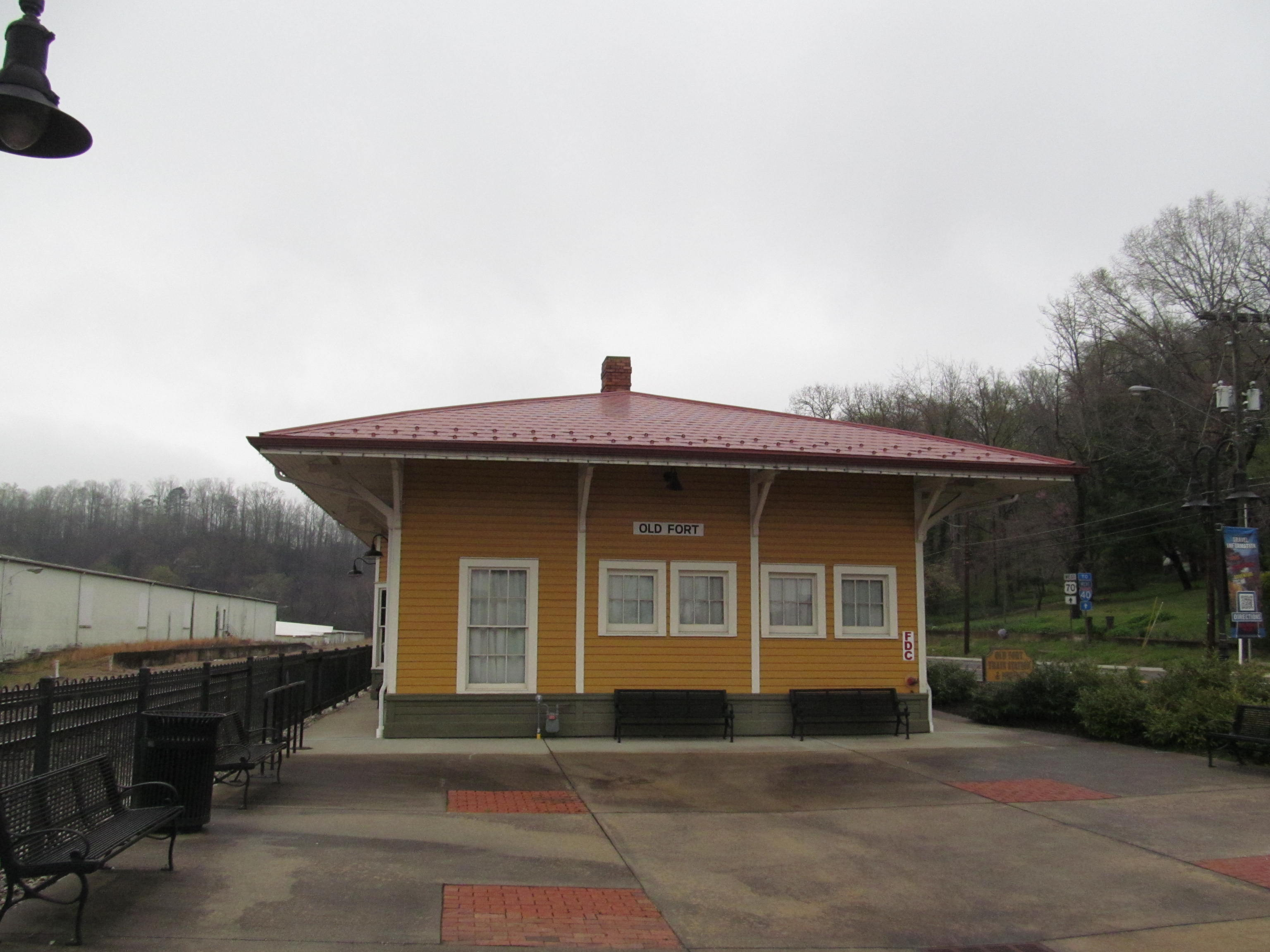
- Old Fort Railroad Depot, April 2014

- Location within North Carolina Location within the United States
- Location: Roughly bounded by E. Main, Spring, Commerce & W. Main Sts., Old Fort, North Carolina
- Coordinates: 35°37′45″N 82°10′53″W
- Area: 9.5 acres (3.8 ha)
- Built: 1894-1960
- Architectural style: Commercial Style, Italianate, Romanesque Revival, Art Moderne
- NRHP reference No.: 11000257
- Added to NRHP: April 29, 2011

Old Fort Commercial Historic District is a national historic district located at Old Fort, McDowell County, North Carolina. The district encompasses 11 contributing buildings, 1 contributing structure, and 1 contributing object in the central business district of Old Fort. It includes notable examples of Italianate, Romanesque Revival and Art Moderne architecture built between 1894 and 1960. Notable buildings include the Bank of Old Fort (c. 1895), Rockett Motors (c. 1940), Roxy Theatre (1946, c. 1962), and Railroad Depot (1894).

It was listed on the National Register of Historic Places in 2011.
