= Davidson's Fort =

Historic site in Old Fort, North Carolina

- Interactive map of the Davidson's Fort area

General information
- Status: Open to the public
- Type: Reconstructed fort
- Location: Old Fort, North Carolina, U.S.
- Coordinates: 35.6272°N 82.1789°W

Technical details
- Floor count: 2
- Floor area: 2,600,000 sq ft (242,000 m^{2})

Website
- davidsonsforthistoricpark.com

Davidson's Fort was a Revolutionary War frontier fort and precursor of town of Old Fort, North Carolina. It was built in 1776 to protect the white settlers from the Cherokee. Davidson's Fort was one of dozens of similar outposts constructed along the frontiers in Georgia, North Carolina, South Carolina, and Virginia to protect settlers from Native Americans who had sided with the British in the war. It was also known as Catawba Fort, Fort Royal, Old Fort, Rutherford's Fort, and Upper Fort.

Local tradition says Davidson's Fort was located on the site of the Mountain Gateway Museum and Heritage Center in Old Fort. The nonprofit Davidson' Fort Historic Park operates an interpretive replica fort located near the site of the original fort. In 2019, Davidson's Fort was included in the proposed Southern Campaign of the Revolution National Heritage Corridor; the congressional act for the heritage corridor passed in July 2022.

== History ==
European settlers moved into the Catawba Valley of North Carolina in the mid-1700s, during the French and Indian War. In 1763, the British and the Cherokee signed a treaty, stating that the British would not settle west of a line across North Carolina. In the early 1770s, several families settled west of that line in what is now McDowell County, including the twins Samuel and William Davidson, and their brothers George and John. (Note: This William Davidson is not to be confused with his cousin, Col. William Davidson, first state senator from Buncombe County, North Carolina. Source: "William Davidson Confusion Continues". (November 17, 2014). Asheville and Buncombe County.) Samuel purchased 644 acres (261 ha; 1.006 sq mi) of land at the headwaters of the Catawba River, now in the present-day town of Old Fort.

Because McDowell County was west of the treaty line, the Davidson family and other settlers were at "the westernmost outpost of Colonial civilization". According to Davidson family tradition, John, his wife Nancy, and all but one of their children were killed on their farm by the Cherokee in the summer of 1776. Because many settlers violated the treaty, the Cherokee sided with the British in the Revolutionary War.

Sometime before June 1776, a North Carolina militia company under the leadership of Captain Samuel Davidson built a small fort or log stockade on George Davidson's land to protect the settlers against increasing hostilities with the Cherokee. (Note: S. A. Ashe says that the fort was built as many as twenty years before the Revolutionary War for protection against the Cherokee and/or Catawba. However, most modern writers cite the Revolutionary War soldiers' pension records which indicate that Davison's Fort was built in 1776.) This militia company would have consisted of around twenty men between the ages of sixteen and sixty from Burke, McDowell, and Rowan Counties, serving a three-month tour of duty without uniforms. Perhaps because Samuel Davidson was the fort's first commander, the stockade was called Davidson's Fort. It was a place where local people could take refuge.

In June 1776, Davidson's Fort was garrisoned by 82 militia troops under the leadership of Captain Reuben White and Lieutenant Samuel Simpson. In June and July, there were several skirmishes between the militia and the Cherokee, leading in the death (and scalping) of White, several privates, and fourteen Cherokee at the Battle of the Fork on July 11, 1776. The battle was so named because of its location adjacent to the mouth of the north fork in the Catawba River. The surviving militia retreated east to the Quakers Meadows Fort until they were reinforced by General Griffith Rutherford and his brigade. Rutherford was the top-ranking military official in the Rowan District which included McDowell County. The brigade included Catawba who had sided with the Americans in the war, Samuel Davidson who became a colonel, and William Davidson who became a major.

From Quakers Meadows, Rutherford headed west to Davidson's Fort, assigning some 300 men to stay there as guards. On September 1, 1776, Rutherford left Davidson's Fort with some 2,400 men to fight the Cherokee at Lower and Middle Towns. This was part of the Cherokee Expedition, a planned simultaneous attack against the Cherokee in three states—North Carolina, South Carolina, and Virginia. However, the Cherokee fled Rutherford's advancing troops, going to safety in Tennessee. Rutherford burned the Cherokee crops and 36 of their towns, and killed their livestock, creating a path of destruction known as Rutherford's Trace. Rutherford and his men returned to Davidson's Fort on October 12, 1776.

The militia stayed at Davidson's Fort for six years during the war, guarding the fort and going out on "spying excursions". Most of the time, the fort was under the leadership of Colonel Carson or Captain Daniel Smith. Smith was in charge of the fort for two extended periods, making him its longest serving commander. (Note: Smith married Mary Davidson, daughter of Major William Davidson.) Other officers associated with Davidson's Fort in 1776 and 1777 include Captain David Caldwell, Captain William Davidson, Captain John Dickey, and Captain Thomas Kennedy. Some of the men stationed at Davidson's Fort fought in the Battle of Kings Mountain on October 7, 1780. The fort operated through the 1780s, serving as a starting point for other campaigns against the Cherokee. It also became a trading post between settlers and the Cherokee, becoming "significant in opening the western part of the State."

In 1784, Samuel Davidson and his family were the first known white settlers west of the Blue Ridge Mountains, settling on Christians Creek in what is now Azalea in Buncombe County. This was property Davidson received as payment for his time in service during the Revolutionary War. After a few weeks, he was killed by some Cherokee. Samuel's wife, Rebecca, escaped with their infant daughter Ruth and an enslaved woman, traveling by foot to Davidson's Fort. (Note: Samuel Davidson's wife was the sister of Col. Daniel Smith.) At the fort, William, Smith, Daniel Smith, and others organized to bury Samuel and track the Cherokee attackers. They killed the Cherokee at a camp when the French Broad and Swannanoa Rivers join (now along the Biltmore Estate in Asheville, North Carolina). They also attacked the Cherokee Village in Swannanoa.

In 1796, the Inferior Court Minutes of Burke County still referred to the site as "Samuel Davidson's Fort". In 1852, David Lowry Swain gave a speech at the stockade of the old fort. In 1871, a grandson of George Davidson sold Old Fort Plantation, a 2,200 acres (890 ha) tract that included the fort, to railroad man Sanborn Worthen who named it Catawba Vale. The town of Catawba Vale was chartered on January 25, 1872. On February 21, 1873, the North Carolina General Assembly renamed the town Old Fort to honor the historic fort.

The last remnant of the fort site was destroyed in the flood of 1916. Local tradition says that the fort site is now the Mountain Gateway Museum and Heritage Center, operated by the North Carolina Department of Natural and Cultural Resources. However, archaeological exploration of the site was inconclusive.

== Memorial ==
On July 27, 1930, a large arrowhead monument was dedicated in Old Fort to memorialize Davidson's Fort. Some 6,000 people attended the ceremony.

== Replica fort ==
On May 16, 1963, a delegation from Old Fort met with staff of the North Carolina Department of Archives and History in Raleigh to discuss reconstructing Davidson's Fort. The delegation was headed by Mary M. Greenlee, president of the McDowell County Historical Society. The proposed project was to start with an investigation by a state archaeologist. In 1965, the North Carolina General Assembly allocated $16,500 toward the project.

The nonprofit Davidson's Fort Historic Park, Inc. was established in 2004 to create an interpretive center on 173 Lackey Town Road in Old Fort, about a mile from the original Davidson's Fort site. In 2007, Senator Joe Sam Queen proposed legislation to award the nonprofit $250,000 to purchase a site and reconstruct Davidson's Fort.

Today, the historic park includes a reconstructed fort. Because no descriptions of the original Davidson's Fort have been found, its reconstruction was based on references to frontier forts of the era in North Carolina, Pennsylvania, South Carolina, and Virginia. The historic park hosts militia muster re-enactments, annual Civil War Days, and recreations of the daily lives of the early European settlers in McDowell County and western North Carolina.
