= Platt D. Walker =

American judge (1849–1923)

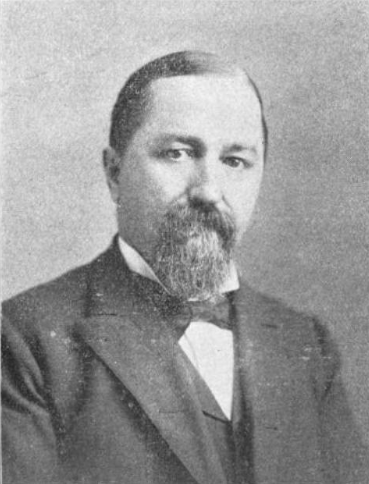
Platt D. Walker

Platt Dickinson Walker (October 25, 1849 – May 22, 1923) was a justice of the North Carolina Supreme Court from 1903 to 1923.

Born in Wilmington, North Carolina, to Thomas D. and Mary Vance (Dickinson) Walker, he was educated at George W. Jewett's School in Wilmington and the Horner School in Oxford, North Carolina. Walker attended the University of North Carolina with the class of 1869, and finished collegiate course at the University of Virginia, where he studied law under Professor John B. Minor and Professor Southall, receiving an LL.B. in 1869. He obtained his license to practice law at the June 1870 term of the state supreme court, gaining admission to the bar in North Carolina and settling at Rockingham in 1870. There, he practiced law with Walter Leak Steele, afterwards member of Congress.

Walker represented Richmond County in the North Carolina House of Representatives from 1874 to 1875. He moved to Charlotte in 1876, and formed a law practice with Clement Dowd, also afterwards member of Congress, joined in November 1880 by Armistead Burwell, afterwards a justice of the state supreme court, and in 1892 be E. T. Cansler.

In January 1903, Walker became an associate justice of a substantially reconfigured Supreme Court of North Carolina. He was thereafter regularly reelected to the court until his death, his last election being in 1918.

== Personal life and death ==
On June 5, 1878, Walker married Henrietta Settle Covington in Reidsville, North Carolina. She died in 1907, and on June 8, 1910, he married Alma Locke Mordecai. Neither marriage produced any children.

Walker died at his home in Raleigh, North Carolina, following an illness of one week and complications arising from his kidneys. He was interred in Wilmington.

Political offices
| Preceded by Court substantially reorganized | Justice of the North Carolina Supreme Court; 1903–1923 | Succeeded by Heriot Clarkson |
