= Welsford Parker Artz House =

Historic house in North Carolina, United States

- U.S. National Register of Historic Places
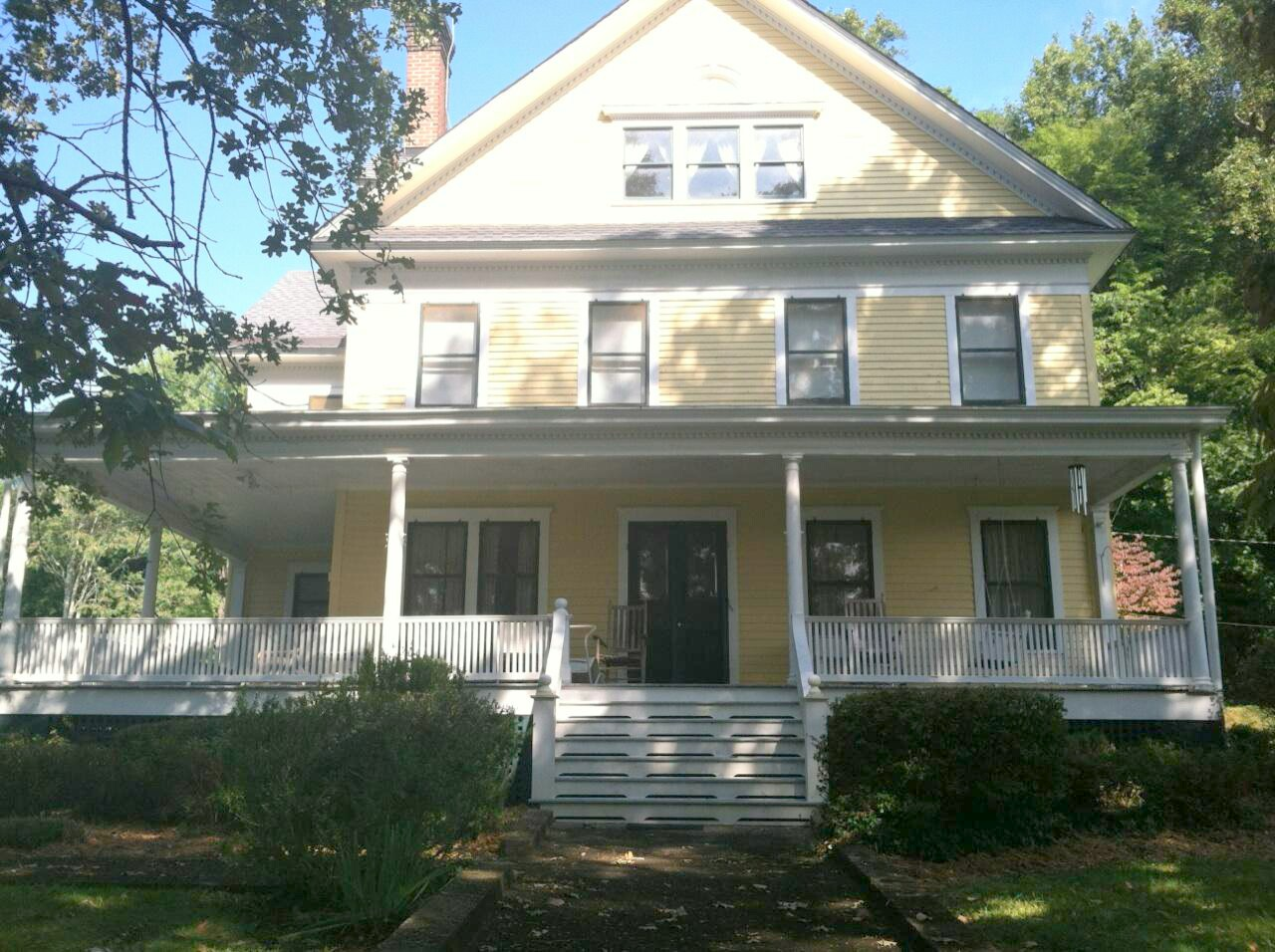
- Welsford Parker Artz House, September 2013

- Location within North Carolina Location within the United States
- Location: 205 Maple St., Old Fort, North Carolina
- Coordinates: 35°37′54″N 82°10′45″W
- Area: 2 acres (0.81 ha)
- Built: 1904-1906
- Built by: Keeter, Merrimon
- Architect: Lindsey, Frank J.
- Architectural style: Colonial Revival, Queen Anne
- NRHP reference No.: 90001311
- Added to NRHP: August 23, 1990

Welsford Parker Artz House, also known as Catawba Hill and Artz House, is a historic home located near Old Fort, McDowell County, North Carolina. It was built between 1904 and 1906, and is 2 1/2-story, five-bay, frame dwelling with Queen Anne and Colonial Revival style design elements. A small, one-story, gabled ell was added between 1912 and 1928. The house is sheathed in weatherboard and a moderately pitched, asphalt shingled roof with a dominant front gable and one-story wraparound front porch.

It was listed on the National Register of Historic Places in 1990.
