= William A. Devin =

American politician (1871–1959)

William Devin
- Born: William Augustus Devin; 1871
- Died: 1959 (aged 87–88)
- Occupation: Jurist
- Known for: Associate justice and chief justice of the North Carolina Supreme Court
- Football career

Personal information
- Listed height: 6 ft 0 in (1.83 m)
- Listed weight: 169 lb (77 kg)

Career information
- College: North Carolina (1892)

Awards and highlights
- Southern championship (1892)

William Augustus Devin (1871–1959) was an American jurist who served as an associate justice and chief justice of the North Carolina Supreme Court.

A native of Granville County, North Carolina, Devin, a Democrat, attended Horner Military Academy, earned his undergraduate degree at Wake Forest College, and his law degree at the University of North Carolina at Chapel Hill. Devin served as mayor of Oxford, North Carolina from 1903 until 1909 and was a captain in the North Carolina National Guard.

He was elected to one term (1911–1913) in the North Carolina House of Representatives from Granville. He also served as a state Superior Court judge (1914–1935) before being appointed by the Governor to the state Supreme Court in 1935. He retired as chief justice in early 1954.

On May 7, 1987, he was commemorated with a portrait.

Legal offices
Preceded by Walter P. Stacy	Chief Justice of North Carolina Supreme Court; 1951 - 1954	Succeeded by M. V. Barnhill
