= Old Fort, North Carolina =

Town in McDowell County, North Carolina

- Town
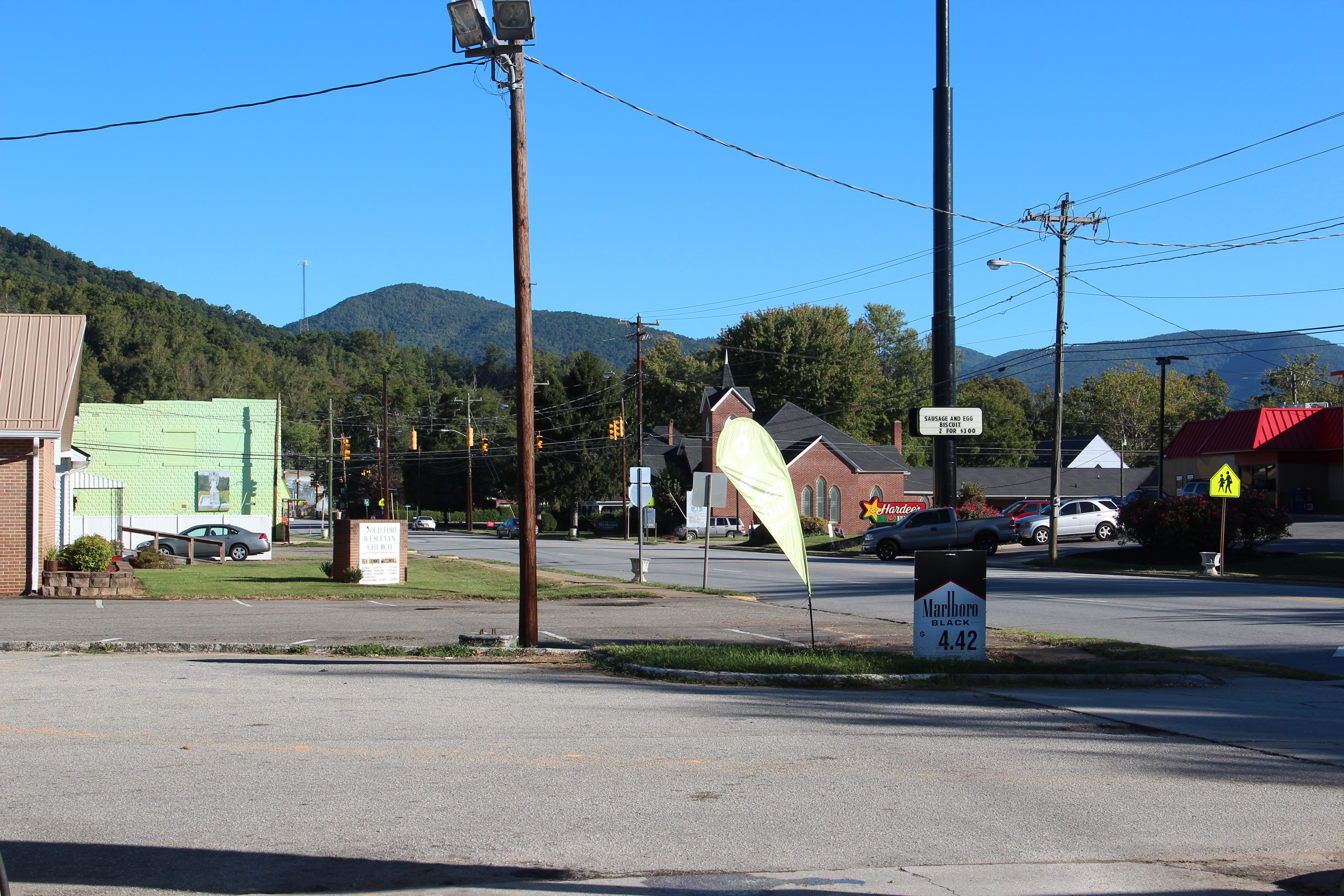
- Catawba Avenue in Old Fort
- Motto: "Once you get here, you never want to leave"
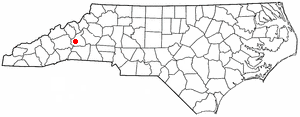
- Location in North Carolina
- Coordinates: 35°37′46″N 82°10′45″W
- Country: United States
- State: North Carolina
- County: McDowell

Area
  - Total: 1.23 sq mi (3.18 km^{2})
  - Land: 1.22 sq mi (3.16 km^{2})
  - Water: 0.0077 sq mi (0.02 km^{2})
- Elevation: 1,447 ft (441 m)

Population (2020)
  - Total: 811
  - Density: 664.3/sq mi (256.48/km^{2})
- Time zone: UTC-5 (Eastern (EST))
  - Summer (DST): UTC-4 (EDT)
- ZIP Code: 28762
- Area code: 828
- FIPS code: 37-48920
- GNIS feature ID: 2407044
- Website: townofoldfort.org

Old Fort is a town in McDowell County, North Carolina, United States. The population was 811 in the 2020 U.S. census, down from 908 in 2010.

== History ==
Before the arrival of European settlers, the area that is now Old Fort was populated by the Catawba and Cherokee. In the 1500s, Spanish explorers came through the area. English and Scottish settlers arrived in the area in the mid-1700s.

During the Revolutionary War, a stockade or fort was constructed on land owned by brothers George and Samuel Davidson, "the westernmost outpost of Colonial civilization". It was called Davidson's Fort and was the post for military expeditions such as that of Gen. Griffith Rutherford in 1776. The fort became a site for trading between settlers and Native Americans.

The arrival of the Western North Carolina Railway (WNCR) in 1869 stimulated the development of a depot and hotel. In 1871, Sanborn Worthen bought the 2,200-acre (890 ha) Old Fort Plantation from George Davidson's grandson and changed its name to Catawba Vale. Worth hoped the railroad would build its yard there, but the WNCR chose another site.

On January 25, 1872, the town of Catawba Vale was founded. The town name was changed to Old Fort on February 23, 1873, honoring its origins. The railroad came to Old Fort in 1879.

In the 1950s the Supreme Court of North Carolina dismissed a case brought by students attempting to attend the all-white school in Old Fort. They were told to attend Hudgins High School, a school for blacks, 12 miles (19 km) away in Marion.

In 1984, the town began free weekly Mountain Music concerts, held in the historic Rockett Building each Friday night downtown. They attracted large audiences and numerous musicians. In mid-2014, the organization that ran Mountain Music lost its arrangement with the building owner, and the weekly music shows ended after 27 years.

== Geography ==
Old Fort is 25 miles (40 km) east of Asheville and 33 miles (53 km) west of Morganton. According to the U.S. Census Bureau, the town has a total area of 1.2 square miles (3.1 km^{2}), all land. Mill Creek, a tributary of the Catawba River, flows through the center of Old Fort. The town is surrounded by Pisgah National Forest which includes bogs, cove forests, fens, and hemlock forests.

=== Climate ===
Old Fort has a humid subtropical climate (Cfa) and average monthly temperatures range from 38.5 °F (3.6 °C) in January to 75.7 °F (24.3 °C) in July. Temperature variations between night and day can reach 21 degrees in the summer and 23 degrees in the winter.

The annual average precipitation at Old Fort is 54.01 inches (137.2 cm). Rainfall is fairly uniformly distributed throughout the year. The wettest month of the year is March, with an average rainfall of 5.59 inches (14.2 cm).

Historical population
Census	Pop.	Note	%±
1890	249		—
1900	253		1.6%
1910	778		207.5%
1920	931		19.7%
1930	866		−7.0%
1940	774		−10.6%
1950	771		−0.4%
1960	787		2.1%
1970	676		−14.1%
1980	752		11.2%
1990	720		−4.3%
2000	963		33.8%
2010	908		−5.7%
2020	811		−10.7%
U.S. Decennial Census

== Demographics ==
=== 2020 census ===
As of the 2020 United States census, there were 811 people, 463 households, and 290 families residing in the town. The racial makeup of the town was 79.04% White, 13.32% African American, 4.19% Hispanic or Latino, 3.21 other races, and 0.25% Asian. The median age is 46.3. Educational attainment of the population is: 18.1% high school diploma and 15.4% with a bachelor's degree.

Old Fort racial composition
Race	Number	Percentage
White (non-Hispanic)	641	79.04%
Black or African American (non-Hispanic)	108	13.32%
Asian	2	0.25%
Other/Mixed	26	3.21%
Hispanic or Latino	34	4.19%

== Economy ==
In 2020, the median household income was $28,269. Males had a median income $36,607 versus $20,625 for females. Of the 463 households in town, 59.2% of the residents own their home. 20.6% of the population lives below the poverty level and 10.4% of the population does not have health insurance.

=== Employers ===
Old Fort's largest industries are Health Care & Social Assistance (78 people), Manufacturing (50 people), and Transportation & Warehousing (46 people). Kitsbow Cycling Apparel, a manufacturer of premier sportswear and accessories, employed sixty full-time people in 2014.

== Arts and culture ==
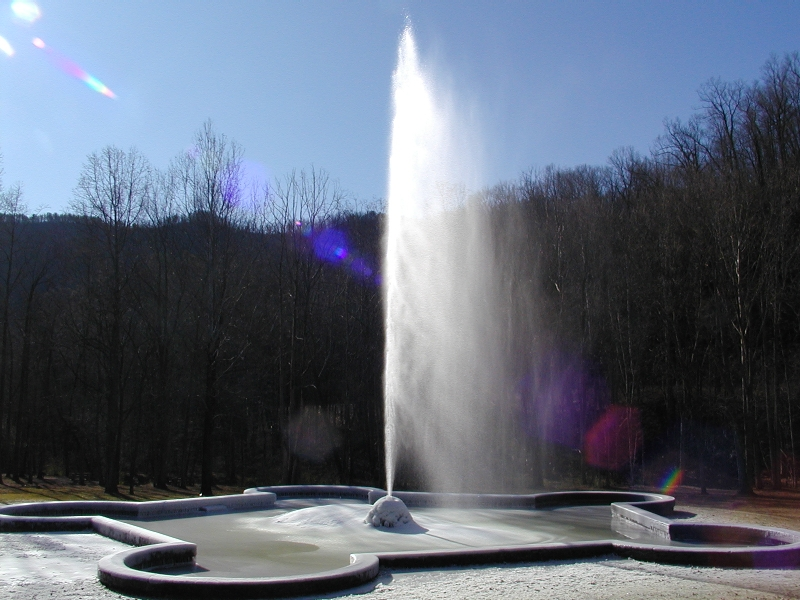
Andrews Geyser

=== Arts and museums ===
Old Fort has several attractions, including Andrews Geyser, a gravity-fed fountain created in 1879 as a railroad attraction. Davidson's Fort Historic Park, a nonprofit organization, has reconstructed Davidson Fort, the Revolutionary War and host re-enactments and educational activities. The state operates the Mountain Gateway Museum and Heritage Center which depicts local traditions and lifestyles from the 18th century through the 20th century The Old Fort Train Depot features a railroad exhibit. The historic Carson House museum is located nine miles east of Old Fort in McDowell County.

=== Events and festivals ===
The Mountain Gateway Museum hosts Pioneer Day on the last Saturday in April. The North Carolina Gold Festival is held the first Friday/Saturday in June, also on the grounds of Mountain Gateway Museum. Old Fort's Chamber of Commerce sponsors Octoberfest the first weekend in October on the grounds of Mountain Gateway Museum.

=== Architecture ===
The Welsford Parker Artz House and Old Fort Commercial Historic District are listed on the National Register of Historic Places. The Arrowhead Monument was built in 1930 as a symbol of peace between the Iroquoian-speaking Cherokee people and Siouan-speaking Catawba people. At the dedication ceremony, more than 6,000 attendees gathered at the town square to see the unveiling of the 14 ft. rose granite arrowhead on a natural stone base.

== Sports ==
Old Fort is the starting point for the annual Assault on Mount Mitchell mountain bike challenge.

== Parks and recreation ==
In 2010, the North Carolina Wildlife Resources Commission added Old Fort to their list of N.C. Mountain Heritage Trout Towns. In downtown Old Fort, the 0.7 miles (1.1 km) section of Mill Creek is a "delayed harvest stream."

The 340 feet (100 m) Catawba Falls, the largest waterfall in McDowell County and the headwaters of the Catawba River, is located 4 miles (6 km) southwest of the town and accessed by hiking trails. In 2009, the N.C. Department of Transportation, local county and town governments, the United States Forest Service, and the local trails association collaborated to arrange for a portion of Old Highway 70, an old forest service road, to be reopened for bicycle and foot traffic. Point Lookout Trail is a popular paved greenway ascending almost 1,000 feet through the Swannanoa Gap in just under 3.6 miles (5.8 km).

== Government ==
Old Fort has six elected officials: the mayor, and five aldermen.

== Infrastructure ==
U.S. Highway 70 passes through the town as Main Street, and Interstate 40 crosses the southern extent of the town, with access from Exits 72 (US 70) and 73 (Catawba Avenue). The Town of Old Fort operates a water and sewage system.

== Notable people ==
- Annie Burgin Craig (1873–1955), First Lady of North Carolina
