= Hudgins High School =

Public high school in Marion, NC, US

Coordinates: 35.6758°N 82.0160°W

Mountain View School, formerly Hudgins High School, was a public high school for African Americans in Marion, North Carolina (McDowell County, North Carolina).

== History ==
The first school for African Americans in the county was established in the 1920's. In 1947, it became a High School. In 1951, the original building was demolished to make way for a new school at a cost of $260,000. At the time the new school was built, 35 African American families chose to instead send their kids to a church for education. In 1955, a group of students from Old Fort, North Carolina attempted to gain entry into its all-white school. They were denied entry despite the recent Brown v. Board of Education decision. The students and their parents took their case to the Supreme Court of North Carolina, but the case was dismissed and the students told to attend Hudgins School 12 miles away.

Mountain View had a 600 seat auditorium. The school closed in 1966 after the school district integrated the all-black and all-white schools.

A reunion was held in 2018.
