= M. V. Barnhill =

American politician

Chief Justice of the North Carolina Supreme Court
- In office 1954–1956
- Preceded by: William A. Devin
- Succeeded by: J. Wallace Winborne

Associate Justice of the North Carolina Supreme Court
- In office 1937–1954

Member of the North Carolina House of Representatives
- In office 1921

Personal details
- Born: Maurice Victor Barnhill; 1887 Halifax County, North Carolina, U.S.
- Died: 1963 (aged 75–76)
- Party: Democratic
- Education: University of North Carolina School of Law
- Profession: Politician, lawyer, judge

Maurice Victor Barnhill (1887–1963) was an associate justice (1937–1954) and chief justice (1954–1956) of the North Carolina Supreme Court.

Barnhill was born in Halifax County, North Carolina on December 5, 1887, and attended the University of North Carolina Law School. He was a prosecutor in Nash County, North Carolina and was elected to the North Carolina House of Representatives, serving in 1921. He was a Nash County judge and a state superior court judge before Governor Clyde R. Hoey appointed him to the state Supreme Court on July 1, 1937.

As a superior court judge, Barnhill presided over the murder trial that followed the Loray Mill Strike.

He was subsequently elected to the Supreme Court in 1938 and re-elected in 1946. Barnhill was appointed Chief Justice by Governor William B. Umstead on February 1, 1954, and he was elected to the post on November 2, 1954.

Barnhill died in 1963.

Legal offices
| Preceded by William A. Devin | Chief Justice of North Carolina Supreme Court; 1954 - 1956 | Succeeded by J. Wallace Winborne |
