= J. Wallace Winborne =

American judge

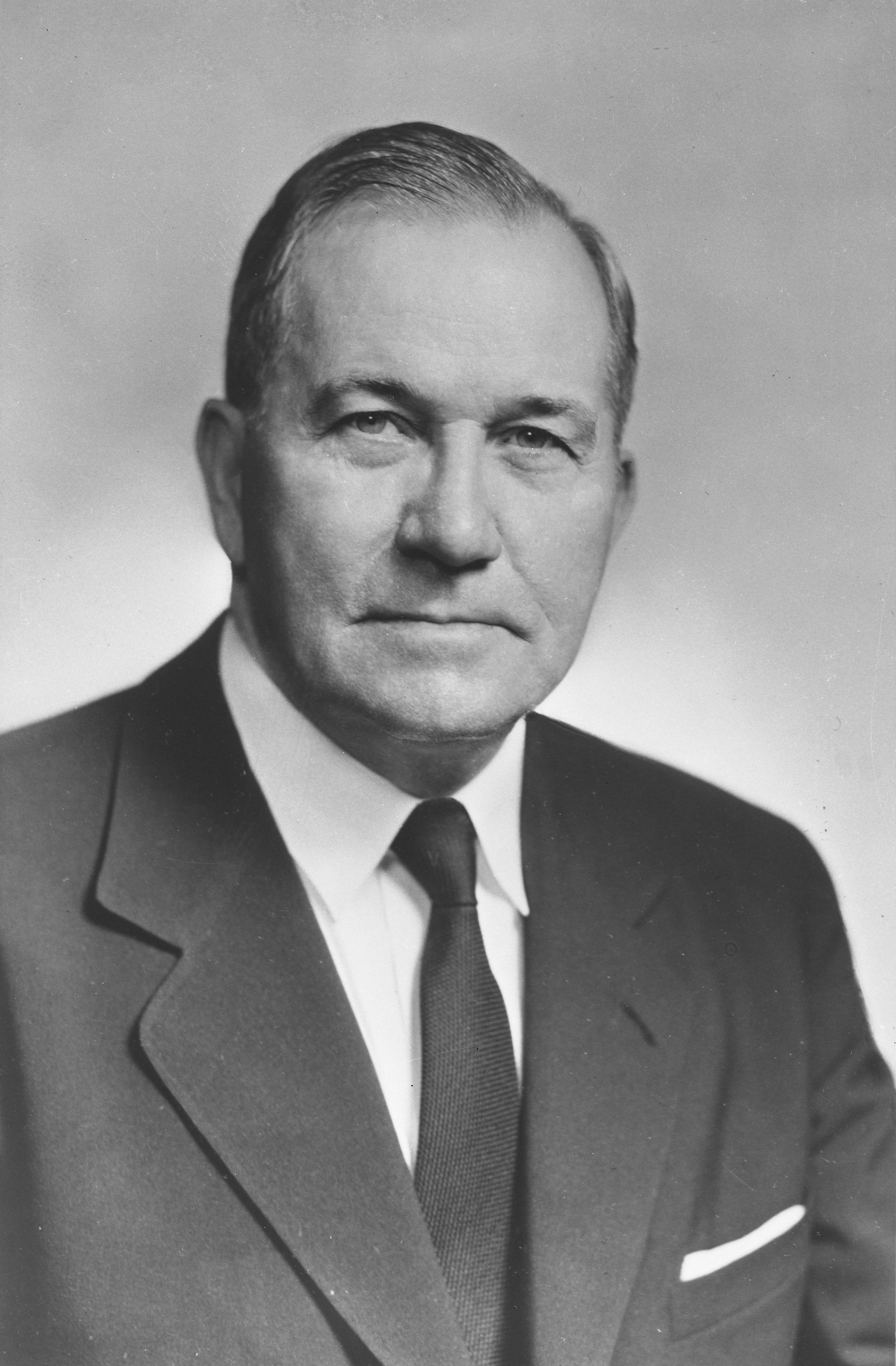
- Winborne in 1956

Chief Justice of the North Carolina Supreme Court
- In office 1956–1962
- Preceded by: M. V. Barnhill
- Succeeded by: Emery B. Denny

Associate Justice of the North Carolina Supreme Court
- In office 1937–1962

Personal details
- Born: John Wallace Winborne; 1884 Chowan County, North Carolina, U.S.
- Died: 1966 (aged 81–82)
- Party: Democratic
- Education: University of North Carolina at Chapel Hill
- Profession: Politician, lawyer, judge

John Wallace Winborne (1884–1966) was an American jurist who served on the North Carolina Supreme Court from 1937 to 1962, including service as chief justice from 1956 to 1962.

Born in Chowan County, North Carolina, Winborne graduated from the Horner Military Academy and the University of North Carolina at Chapel Hill, moved to Marion, North Carolina around 1910, and joined the law firm of J. Will Pless. He became active in politics, serving as chairman of the North Carolina Democratic Party at one time. Winborne was also a mason and rose to become grand master of the state Masonic Lodge. He was appointed by Gov. Clyde R. Hoey to the state's highest court as an associate justice when the court's size was increased from five to seven justices in 1937. Gov. Luther Hodges appointed Winborne chief justice in 1956 after Chief Justice Barnhill retired.

Legal offices
Preceded by M. V. Barnhill	Chief Justice of North Carolina Supreme Court; 1956 - 1962	Succeeded by Emery B. Denny
